= Illinois's 2nd congressional district =

U.S. House district for Illinois

Coordinates: 41°15′22″N 87°47′24″W

- Interactive map of district boundaries since January 3, 2023
- Representative: Robin Kelly; D–Matteson
- Area: 3,935.9 mi^{2} (10,194 km^{2})
- Population (2025): 731,321
- Median household income: $62,790
- Ethnicity: 49.5% Black; 34.4% White; 14.7% Hispanic; 1.5% Asian; 1.2% Native American; 0.1% Pacific Islander Americans
- Cook PVI: D+18

Illinois's 2nd congressional district is a congressional district in the U.S. state of Illinois. It stretches south from Chicago's Kenwood community area through portions of the city's South Side and southern suburbs, extending into several more rural counties outside of Chicagoland. Nearly two-thirds of its residents live in densely populated Cook County.

The 2nd district is nearly 50% Black and has voted reliably Democratic for decades. All four of its representatives since 1980 have been Black. The seat is currently represented by Democrat Robin Kelly, who announced in 2025 that she would pursue a Senate campaign in lieu of reelection.

In recent years, this district has been the site of multiple congressional scandals. Rep. Gus Savage lost his primary in 1992 after making antisemitic statements, and his two successors — Mel Reynolds and Jesse Jackson Jr. — resigned from office amid legal battles pertaining to sexual assault and campaign finance violations, respectively.

== Composition ==
For the 118th and successive Congresses (based on redistricting following the 2020 census), the district contains all or portions of the following counties, townships, and municipalities:

Champaign County (12)

Brown Township, Dewey, East Bend Township, Fisher (part, also 15th), Foosland, Harwood Township, Gifford (part, also 15th), Kerr Township, Ludlow, Ludlow Township, Rantoul, Rantoul Township (part, also 15th)

Cook County (36)

Bloom Township, Blue Island (part, also 1st), Bremen Township (part, also 1st and 6th), Burnham, Calumet City, Calumet Park (part, also 1st), Calumet Township (part, also 1st), Chicago (part, also 1st, 3rd, 4th, 5th, 6th, 7th, 8th, and 9th; shared with DuPage County), Chicago Heights, Country Club Hills (part, also 1st), Dixmoor (part, also 1st), Dolton, East Hazel Crest, Flossmoor, Ford Heights, Frankfort (part, also 1st; shared with Will County), Glenwood, Harvey (part, also 1st), Hazel Crest, Homewood, Lansing, Lynwood, Markham (part, also 1st), Matteson (part, also 1st), Olympia Fields, Park Forest (part; shared with Will County), Phoenix, Richton Park, Rich Township (part, also 1st), Riverdale, Sauk Village, South Chicago Heights, South Holland, Steger (part; shared with Will County), Thornton, Thornton Township (part, also 1st)

Ford County (21)

Brenton Township, Button Township, Cabery (part, also Kankakee County), Dix Township, Drummer Township (part, also 16th), Elliott, Gibson City (part, also 16th), Kempton, Lyman Township, Melvin, Mona Township, Patton Township, Paxton, Peach Orchard Township, Pella Township, Piper City, Roberts, Rogers Township, Sibley, Sullivant Township, Wall Township

Iroquois County (47)

All 47 townships and municipalities

Kankakee County (34)

Aroma Park, Aroma Township, Bonfield, Bourbonnais (part, also 1st), Bourbonnais Township (part, also 1st), Bradley (part, also 1st), Buckingham, Cabery (part; shared with Ford County), Chebanse (part; shared with Iroquois County), Essex, Essex Township, Ganeer Township, Herscher, Hopkins Park, Irwin, Kankakee, Kankakee Township, Limestone, Limestone Township, Manteno Township (part, also 1st), Momence, Momence Township, Norton Township, Otto Township, Pembroke Township, Pilot Township, Reddick, Sammons Point, Salina Township, St. Anne, St. Anne Township, Sumner Township, Sun River Terrace, Union Hill, Yellowhead Township

Livingston County (30)

Avoca Township, Belle Prairie Township, Broughton Township, Campus, Charlotte Township, Chatsworth, Chatsworth Township, Cullom, Dwight (part, also 16th; shared with Grundy County), Dwight Township, Emmington, Fairbury, Fayette Township, Forrest, Forrest Township, Germanville Township, Indian Grove Township, Nevada Township, Odell, Odell Township, Owego Township, Pleasant Ridge Township, Pontiac (part, also 16th), Pontiac Township (part, also 16th), Round Grove Township, Saunemin, Saunemin Township, Strawn, Sullivan Township, Union Township

Vermillion County (27)

Alvin, Belgium, Bismarck, Blount Township, Butler Township, Catlin, Catlin Township (part, also 15th), Danville, Danville Township, Fithian, Georgetown Township (part, also 15th), Grant Township, Henning, Hoopeston, Middlefork Township, Muncie, Newell Township, Pilot Township, Potomac, Rankin, Ross Township, Rossville, South Ross Township, Tilton, Oakwood, Oakwood Township, Westville

Will County (12)

Beecher, Crete, Crete Township, Frankfort (part, also 1st; shared with Cook County), Monee, Monee Township, Park Forest (part, shared with Cook County), Peotone, Peotone Township (part, also 1st), University Park, Washington Township, Will Township

The 2nd district includes the following Chicago neighborhoods:

- Hegewisch
- Hyde Park (part)
- Jackson Park
- Kenwood (part)
- Pullman (part)
- Riverdale
- Roseland (part)
- South Deering (part)
- South Shore (part)
- Woodlawn (part)

=== Demographics ===
The southeast side of Chicago was for many decades the home of numerous Eastern European and Irish immigrants who sought the industrial work of the steel mills and railroad companies which were then dominant in the area. However, as local industry declined in the 1950s and 1960s, these groups were increasingly displaced by African Americans who were gradually migrating southward from other parts of the city. Whereas barely 20% of district residents were black in the 1960s, this figure increased to 70% by the 1980s, and by the 1990s the racial demographics of the 1st and 2nd congressional districts were very similar. At the same time, decreasing population in the district required expanding its borders into the suburbs, and it is now nearly three times the size it was in the 1980s, when it covered only 68 square miles (180 km^{2}).

Following redistricting for the 2000s (decade), 59% of the 2nd congressional district's population resides in the suburbs, with a total of 98.4% living in Cook County. The district's white population (almost 30% of its residents) now primarily resides in the southern suburbs and a few far southeastern Chicago neighborhoods such as East Side and Hegewisch.

Several suburbs closer to Chicago near Interstate 57 have black populations exceeding 75%: Calumet Park, Country Club Hills, Dolton, Harvey, Hazel Crest, Markham, Matteson, Phoenix, Richton Park, Riverdale, and University Park. In contrast, there are five suburbs further southeast with white populations exceeding 75% – Homewood, Lansing, South Chicago Heights, Steger and Thornton – although they surround Ford Heights, with a population of only about 2800 the district's most racially one-sided population (96% black). Chicago Heights features the most even racial mix, with a population that is 45% white and 38% black. The district's largest white ethnic groups are German (5.8%), Irish (4.4%), Polish (4.4%) and Italian (3.1%), similar to other districts in southern Cook County.

Hispanics represent 10% of the district's population, with sizable communities in East Side and Chicago Heights. Chicago's South Shore neighborhood was the longtime home to a Jewish community which has since migrated to suburbs such as Homewood and Flossmoor . South Shore is now primarily a middle-class black community and is also home to a notable minority of Black Muslims including the national headquarters of the Nation of Islam, Mosque Maryam. The district includes some sharp economic disparities. Olympia Fields, Country Club Hills and Matteson are affluent suburbs with black majority populations, but Ford Heights (only four miles east of Olympia Fields) is one of the most impoverished places in the United States, with a median household income of just $17,500 in 2000 – less than 42% of the national average. It is home to more single mothers per capita than anyplace else in the country.

== Recent election results from statewide races ==
Year	Office	Results
2008	President	Obama 74% - 25%
2012	President	Obama 74% - 26%
2016	President	Clinton 69% - 27%
2016	Senate	Duckworth 69% - 26%
2016	Comptroller (Spec.)	Mendoza 65% - 30%
2018	Governor	Pritzker 69% - 26%
2018	Attorney General	Raoul 69% - 29%
2018	Secretary of State	White 79% - 19%
2018	Comptroller	Mendoza 73% - 25%
2018	Treasurer	Frerichs 73% - 24%
2020	President	Biden 69% - 29%
2020	Senate	Durbin 63% - 26%
2022	Senate	Duckworth 68% - 30%
2022	Governor	Pritzker 66% - 32%
2022	Attorney General	Raoul 66% - 32%
2022	Secretary of State	Giannoulias 66% - 32%
2022	Comptroller	Mendoza 69% - 30%
2022	Treasurer	Frerichs 67% - 31%
2024	President	Harris 66% - 33%

=== Presidential voting ===
This table indicates how the 2nd District has voted in U.S. presidential elections; election results reflect voting in the district as it was configured at the time of the election, not as it is configured today. The candidate who received the most votes in the district is listed first; the candidate who won the election nationally is in CAPS, and the candidate who won the state of Illinois is indicated with a †.

Election	District winner	Runner-up	Other candidates
1852	PIERCE† (D), 8,021 (49%)	Scott (W), 5,882 (36%)	Hale (Free Soil), 2,500 (15%)
1856	Frémont (R), 21,556 (67%)	BUCHANAN† (D), 9,843 (30%)	Fillmore (American), 966 (3%)
1860	LINCOLN† (R), 30,856 (64%)	Douglas (D), 16,993 (35%)	Bell (Constitutional Union), 192 (0.4%); Breckinridge (D), 128 (0.3%)
1864	LINCOLN† (R), 18,305 (78%)	McClellan (D), 5,231 (22%)	
1868	GRANT† (R), 20,946 (77%)	Seymour (D), 6,270 (23%)	
1952	Stevenson (D), 94,905 (51%)	EISENHOWER† (R), 91,522 (49%)	
1956	Stevenson (D), 81,570 (50%)	EISENHOWER† (R), 81,296 (50%)	
1968	Humphrey (D), 103,924 (59%)	NIXON† (R), 52,311 (30%)	Wallace (AIP), 18,896 (11%)
1972	McGovern (D), 116,534 (66%)	NIXON† (R), 60,220 (34%)	
1976	CARTER (D), 137,384 (83%)	Ford† (R), 28,498 (17%)	
1980	Carter (D), 145,205 (84%)	REAGAN† (R), 20,946 (12%)	Anderson (Indep.), 3,612 (2%)
1984	Mondale (D), 168,174 (84%)	REAGAN† (R), 32,693 (16%)	
1988	Dukakis (D), 150,387 (84%)	BUSH† (R), 25,896 (15%)	
1992	CLINTON† (D), 194,639 (80%)	Bush (R), 31,634 (13%)	Perot (Indep.), 16,950 (7%)
1996	CLINTON† (D), 170,819 (85%)	Dole (R), 22,204 (11%)	Perot (Reform), 6,395 (3%)
2000	Gore† (D), 188,289 (89%)	BUSH (R), 21,838 (10%)	Nader (Green), 1,626 (1%)
2004	Kerry† (D), 230,613 (84%)	BUSH (R), 43,822 (16%)	
2008	OBAMA† (D), 260,869 (90%)	McCain (R), 28,676 (10%)	
2012	OBAMA† (D), (81%)	Romney (R), (19%)	

== History ==
=== 2011 redistricting ===
The district covers parts of Cook and Will counties and all of Kankakee, as of the 2011 redistricting which followed the 2010 census. All or parts of Bradley, Bourbonnais, Calumet City, Chicago, Chicago Heights, Country Club Hills, Dolton, Harvey, Hazel Crest, Homewood, Kankakee, Lansing, Markham, Matteson, Park Forest, Richton Park, Riverdale, Sauk Village, Steger and Thornton are included. The representatives for these districts were elected in the 2012 primary and general elections, and the boundaries became effective on January 3, 2013.

=== Prominent representatives ===
Representative	Notes
John Wentworth	Elected the 21st Mayor of Chicago (1860 – 1861)
John F. Farnsworth	Served as a colonel of the Union Army during the American Civil War (1861 – 1863)
John Alexander McClernand	Served as a brigadier general and major general of the Union Army during the American Civil War (1861 – 1864)
Carter Harrison III	Elected the 29th Mayor of Chicago (1879 – 1887); Elected the 33rd Mayor of Chicago (1893)
William Lorimer	Elected the U.S. Senator from Illinois (1909 – 1912)
James Robert Mann	Served as U.S. House Minority Leader (1911 – 1919)
Abner Mikva	Appointed judge of the United States Court of Appeals for the District of Columbia Circuit (1979 – 1994); Served as chief judge of the United States Court of Appeals for the District of Columbia Circuit (1991 – 1994); Served as White House Counsel to President Bill Clinton (1994 – 1995)

=== Economy ===
The 2nd Congressional District was, for most of the 20th century, a thriving center of heavy industry centered around Lake Calumet and the Port of Chicago, augmented by the nearby railroad industry which had the Pullman Company as its centerpiece. The steel industry was a major component, with U.S. Steel at one time employing 20,000 district residents, but the Wisconsin Steelworks in South Deering closed in March 1980, and U.S. Steel's South Works plant in South Chicago – source of the steel for Chicago skyscrapers including the Sears Tower – was closed in April 1992; both have since been dismantled. Virtually the last remnant of the industry in the area is ISG Riverdale (formerly the Acme Steel Co.), which began a shutdown in 2001 before being sold and restructured as a smaller company. The most significant remaining industrial presence in the district is now the Ford Motor Company, which operates the Chicago Assembly plant (where the Ford Explorer is manufactured) on the border between South Deering and Hegewisch, as well as the Chicago Stamping facility in Chicago Heights. Like the 1st District, the area is struggling to overcome economic downturns in recent decades.

Local educational institutions include Governors State University in University Park, Chicago State University in Roseland, Prairie State College in Chicago Heights, South Suburban College in South Holland and Olive-Harvey College, a Chicago city college, in Pullman. The University of Chicago is directly west of the district's northern end. Hospitals in the district include Ingalls Memorial Hospital in Harvey, Advocate South Suburban Hospital in Hazel Crest, St. James Hospitals in Chicago Heights and Olympia Fields, Advocate Trinity Hospital in Calumet Heights, La Rabida Children's Hospital in Woodlawn, South Shore Hospital in South Chicago and Roseland Community Hospital in Roseland.

The Museum of Science and Industry is located almost at the district's northern tip. Various areas of the Cook County Forest Preserves are scattered throughout the suburban part of the district, particularly in the area northeast of Chicago Heights. Other notable business and industrial presences in the district include Jays Foods, a manufacturer of snack foods based in Pullman; the Norfolk Southern Railway; Allied Tube and Conduit, a piping and electrical manufacturer in Harvey ; and UGN Inc., an automotive soundproofing manufacturer in Chicago Heights.

Federal facilities in the district include Coast Guard Station Calumet Harbor in East Side and the Vietnam Veterans Memorial Army Reserve Center, home of the 308th Civil Affairs Brigade, in Homewood.

In addition to the Jackson Park Historic Landscape District and the Museum of Science and Industry's U-505, district locations on the National Register of Historic Places include:

- AVR 661, South Deering
- Bloom Township High School, Chicago Heights
- Calumet Park, East Side
- Flamingo-on-the-Lake Apartments, Hyde Park
- Flat Iron Building, Chicago Heights
- Ford Airport Hangar, Lansing
- Hotel Del Prado, Hyde Park
- Jeffery-Cyril Historic District, South Shore
- Lake-Side Terrace Apartments, South Shore
- Allan Miller House, South Shore
- Olympia Fields Country Club, Olympia Fields
- Pacesetter Gardens Historic District, Riverdale (suburb)
- Palmer Park, Roseland
- Promontory Apartments, Hyde Park
- Pullman Historic District National Historic Landmark, Pullman
- Shoreland Hotel, Hyde Park
- South Shore Beach Apartments, South Shore
- South Shore Country Club, South Shore
- Trumbull Park, South Deering

== List of members representing the district ==
Member	Party	Years	Cong ress	Electoral history	District location
District created March 4, 1833
Zadok Casey (Mount Vernon)	Jacksonian	March 4, 1833 – March 3, 1837	23rd 24th	Elected in 1832. Re-elected in 1834. Re-elected in 1836. Re-elected in 1838. Re-elected in 1840. Lost re-election.	1833–1843; Included nineteen counties in eastern and southeastern Illinois: Clark, Clay, Coles, Crawford, Edgar, Edwards, Effingham, Fayette, Hamilton, Jasper, Jefferson, Lawrence, Marion, Montgomery, Shelby, Vermilion, Wabash, Wayne and White counties (several additional counties were later created within this area).
Zadok Casey (Mount Vernon)	Democratic	March 4, 1837 – March 3, 1841	25th 26th	Elected in 1832. Re-elected in 1834. Re-elected in 1836. Re-elected in 1838. Re-elected in 1840. Lost re-election.	1833–1843; Included nineteen counties in eastern and southeastern Illinois: Clark, Clay, Coles, Crawford, Edgar, Edwards, Effingham, Fayette, Hamilton, Jasper, Jefferson, Lawrence, Marion, Montgomery, Shelby, Vermilion, Wabash, Wayne and White counties (several additional counties were later created within this area).
Zadok Casey (Mount Vernon)	Independent Democrat	March 4, 1841 – March 3, 1843	27th	Elected in 1832. Re-elected in 1834. Re-elected in 1836. Re-elected in 1838. Re-elected in 1840. Lost re-election.	1833–1843; Included nineteen counties in eastern and southeastern Illinois: Clark, Clay, Coles, Crawford, Edgar, Edwards, Effingham, Fayette, Hamilton, Jasper, Jefferson, Lawrence, Marion, Montgomery, Shelby, Vermilion, Wabash, Wayne and White counties (several additional counties were later created within this area).
John A. McClernand (Shawneetown)	Democratic	March 4, 1843 – March 3, 1851	28th 29th 30th 31st	Elected in 1842. Re-elected in 1844. Re-elected in 1846. Re-elected in 1848. Retired.	1843–1853; Reduced in size and slightly shifted to take in fifteen counties in southeastern Illinois: Edwards, Franklin, Gallatin, Hamilton, Hardin, Jefferson, Johnson, Marion, Massac, Pope, Pulaski, Wabash, Wayne, White and Williamson counties.
Willis Allen (Marion)	Democratic	March 4, 1851 – March 3, 1853	32nd	Elected in 1850. Redistricted to the 9th district.	1843–1853; Reduced in size and slightly shifted to take in fifteen counties in southeastern Illinois: Edwards, Franklin, Gallatin, Hamilton, Hardin, Jefferson, Johnson, Marion, Massac, Pope, Pulaski, Wabash, Wayne, White and Williamson counties.
John Wentworth (Chicago)	Democratic	March 4, 1853 – March 3, 1855	33rd	Elected in 1852. [data missing]	1853–1863; Relocated to cover seven counties stretching across the northern part of the state: Cook, DeKalb, DuPage, Kane, Lee, Rock Island and Whiteside counties.
James H. Woodworth (Chicago)	Republican	March 4, 1855 – March 3, 1857	34th	Elected in 1854. Retired.	1853–1863; Relocated to cover seven counties stretching across the northern part of the state: Cook, DeKalb, DuPage, Kane, Lee, Rock Island and Whiteside counties.
John F. Farnsworth (Chicago)	Republican	March 4, 1857 – March 3, 1861	35th 36th	Elected in 1856. Re-elected in 1858. Retired.	1853–1863; Relocated to cover seven counties stretching across the northern part of the state: Cook, DeKalb, DuPage, Kane, Lee, Rock Island and Whiteside counties.
Isaac N. Arnold (Chicago)	Republican	March 4, 1861 – March 3, 1863	37th	Elected in 1860. Redistricted to the 1st district.	1853–1863; Relocated to cover seven counties stretching across the northern part of the state: Cook, DeKalb, DuPage, Kane, Lee, Rock Island and Whiteside counties.
John F. Farnsworth (St. Charles)	Republican	March 4, 1863 – March 3, 1873	38th 39th 40th 41st 42nd	Elected in 1862. Re-elected in 1864. Re-elected in 1866. Re-elected in 1868. Re-elected in 1870. Lost renomination.	1863–1873; Included six counties to the north and west of Cook County: Boone, DeKalb, Kane, Lake, McHenry and Winnebago counties.
Jasper D. Ward (Chicago)	Republican	March 4, 1873 – March 3, 1875	43rd	Elected in 1872. Lost re-election.	1873–1883; Became a portion of Cook County, and included the part of Chicago's west side between the North Branch of the Chicago River and 16th Street; the city's western boundary was then Western Avenue from the river to North Avenue, and Crawford Avenue (now Pulaski Road) from North to 16th.
Carter Harrison III (Chicago)	Democratic	March 4, 1875 – March 3, 1879	44th 45th	Elected in 1874. Re-elected in 1876. Retired.	1873–1883; Became a portion of Cook County, and included the part of Chicago's west side between the North Branch of the Chicago River and 16th Street; the city's western boundary was then Western Avenue from the river to North Avenue, and Crawford Avenue (now Pulaski Road) from North to 16th.
George R. Davis (Chicago)	Republican	March 4, 1879 – March 3, 1883	46th 47th	Elected in 1878. Re-elected in 1880. Redistricted to the 3rd district.	1873–1883; Became a portion of Cook County, and included the part of Chicago's west side between the North Branch of the Chicago River and 16th Street; the city's western boundary was then Western Avenue from the river to North Avenue, and Crawford Avenue (now Pulaski Road) from North to 16th.
John F. Finerty (Chicago)	Independent Democrat	March 4, 1883 – March 3, 1885	48th	Elected in 1882. [data missing]	1883–1895; Included parts of Chicago's west and southwest sides. On the west side, it included the area between 12th Street (now Roosevelt Road) on the north and the river and Illinois and Michigan Canal on the south, as well as a small area north of 12th Street near the river; the western boundary was still Crawford Avenue. South of the river and canal, the district included the area between 16th Street on the north, Clark Street on the east, 39th Street (now Pershing Road) on the south and Western Avenue on the west. Illinois gained two additional representatives following the 1890 census, but they were elected on an at-large basis for the 1893–1895 term before redistricting occurred, and the previous decade's districting remained in effect.
Frank Lawler (Chicago)	Democratic	March 4, 1885 – March 3, 1891	49th 50th 51st	Elected in 1884. Re-elected in 1886. Re-elected in 1888. [data missing]	
Lawrence E. McGann (Chicago)	Democratic	March 4, 1891 – March 3, 1895	52nd 53rd	Elected in 1890. Re-elected in 1892. Redistricted to the 3rd district.	
William Lorimer (Chicago)	Republican	March 4, 1895 – March 3, 1901	54th 55th 56th	Elected in 1894. Re-elected in 1896. Re-elected in 1898. Lost re-election.	1895–1903; Included the twelve townships comprising western Cook County (Cicero, Elk Grove, Hanover, Lemont, Leyden, Lyons, Maine, Norwood Park, Palos, Proviso, Riverside, Schaumburg), as well as the part of Chicago's west side bordered on the east by Crawford Avenue from North Avenue to 12th Street, Wood Street from 12th to the canal, Western from the canal to 39th, and State Street from 39th to 63rd Streets; also included was the area north of 12th to Taylor Street between Campbell Avenue and Wood.
John J. Feely (Chicago)	Democratic	March 4, 1901 – March 3, 1903	57th	Elected in 1900. Retired.	
James Robert Mann (Chicago)	Republican	March 4, 1903 – November 30, 1922	58th 59th 60th 61st 62nd 63rd 64th 65th 66th 67th	Redistricted from the 1st district and re-elected in 1902. Re-elected in 1904. Re-elected in 1906. Re-elected in 1908. Re-elected in 1910. Re-elected in 1912. Re-elected in 1914. Re-elected in 1916. Re-elected in 1918. Re-elected in 1920. Re-elected in 1922. Died.	1903–1949; Began to take its modern form, and included the part of Chicago south of 43rd Street having as its western boundary State Street from 43rd to 99th Streets, Stewart Avenue from 99th to 103rd, Halsted Street from 103rd to 111th, Peoria Street from 111th to 115th, and Ashland Avenue from 115th to the city line. Illinois's districts were not redrawn until 1947, taking effect for the 1948 elections.
Vacant		November 30, 1922 – April 3, 1923	67th 68th		1903–1949; Began to take its modern form, and included the part of Chicago south of 43rd Street having as its western boundary State Street from 43rd to 99th Streets, Stewart Avenue from 99th to 103rd, Halsted Street from 103rd to 111th, Peoria Street from 111th to 115th, and Ashland Avenue from 115th to the city line. Illinois's districts were not redrawn until 1947, taking effect for the 1948 elections.
Morton D. Hull (Chicago)	Republican	April 3, 1923 – March 3, 1933	68th 69th 70th 71st 72nd	Elected to finish Mann's term. Re-elected in 1924. Re-elected in 1926. Re-elected in 1928. Re-elected in 1930. Retired.	1903–1949; Began to take its modern form, and included the part of Chicago south of 43rd Street having as its western boundary State Street from 43rd to 99th Streets, Stewart Avenue from 99th to 103rd, Halsted Street from 103rd to 111th, Peoria Street from 111th to 115th, and Ashland Avenue from 115th to the city line. Illinois's districts were not redrawn until 1947, taking effect for the 1948 elections.
P. H. Moynihan (Chicago)	Republican	March 4, 1933 – January 3, 1935	73rd	Elected in 1932. Lost re-election.	1903–1949; Began to take its modern form, and included the part of Chicago south of 43rd Street having as its western boundary State Street from 43rd to 99th Streets, Stewart Avenue from 99th to 103rd, Halsted Street from 103rd to 111th, Peoria Street from 111th to 115th, and Ashland Avenue from 115th to the city line. Illinois's districts were not redrawn until 1947, taking effect for the 1948 elections.
Raymond S. McKeough (Chicago)	Democratic	January 3, 1935 – January 3, 1943	74th 75th 76th 77th	Elected in 1934. Re-elected in 1936. Re-elected in 1938. Re-elected in 1940. Retired.	1903–1949; Began to take its modern form, and included the part of Chicago south of 43rd Street having as its western boundary State Street from 43rd to 99th Streets, Stewart Avenue from 99th to 103rd, Halsted Street from 103rd to 111th, Peoria Street from 111th to 115th, and Ashland Avenue from 115th to the city line. Illinois's districts were not redrawn until 1947, taking effect for the 1948 elections.
William A. Rowan (Chicago)	Democratic	January 3, 1943 – January 3, 1947	78th 79th	Elected in 1942. Re-elected in 1944. Lost re-election.	1903–1949; Began to take its modern form, and included the part of Chicago south of 43rd Street having as its western boundary State Street from 43rd to 99th Streets, Stewart Avenue from 99th to 103rd, Halsted Street from 103rd to 111th, Peoria Street from 111th to 115th, and Ashland Avenue from 115th to the city line. Illinois's districts were not redrawn until 1947, taking effect for the 1948 elections.
Richard B. Vail (Chicago)	Republican	January 3, 1947 – January 3, 1949	80th	Elected in 1946. Lost re-election.	1903–1949; Began to take its modern form, and included the part of Chicago south of 43rd Street having as its western boundary State Street from 43rd to 99th Streets, Stewart Avenue from 99th to 103rd, Halsted Street from 103rd to 111th, Peoria Street from 111th to 115th, and Ashland Avenue from 115th to the city line. Illinois's districts were not redrawn until 1947, taking effect for the 1948 elections.
Barratt O'Hara (Chicago)	Democratic	January 3, 1949 – January 3, 1951	81st	Elected in 1948. Lost re-election.	1949–1963; Reduced in size, included a part of Chicago bounded on the north by Marquette Road (State Street to South Park Boulevard, later renamed King Drive), South Chicago Avenue (South Park to Cottage Grove Avenue) and Pershing Road (Cottage Grove to the lake), and on the west by State Street (Marquette to 73rd), Indiana Avenue (73rd to 83rd) and South Park (83rd to 95th Streets). The southern boundary was formed by 95th Street from South Park to the eastern boundary of the Burnside community, following that northwest to 87th Street, and then 87th to Jeffery Boulevard, South Chicago Avenue from Jeffery to 85th Street, 85th to Baltimore Avenue, following that south to 87th, and 87th Street to the lake. The same boundaries were maintained in the redistricting after 1950.
Richard B. Vail (Chicago)	Republican	January 3, 1951 – January 3, 1953	82nd	Elected in 1950. Lost re-election.	
Barratt O'Hara (Chicago)	Democratic	January 3, 1953 – January 3, 1969	83rd 84th 85th 86th 87th 88th 89th 90th	Elected in 1952. Re-elected in 1954. Re-elected in 1956. Re-elected in 1958. Re-elected in 1960. Re-elected in 1962. Re-elected in 1964. Re-elected in 1966. Lost renomination.	
Barratt O'Hara (Chicago)	Democratic	January 3, 1953 – January 3, 1969	83rd 84th 85th 86th 87th 88th 89th 90th	Elected in 1952. Re-elected in 1954. Re-elected in 1956. Re-elected in 1958. Re-elected in 1960. Re-elected in 1962. Re-elected in 1964. Re-elected in 1966. Lost renomination.	1963–1967; Again expanded to the south, and included that part of Chicago south of 46th Street bounded on the west by Cottage Grove (46th to 65th), Stony Island Avenue (65th to 99th), State Street (99th to 111th), Wentworth Avenue (111th to 113th) and Halsted (113th to the city line).
Barratt O'Hara (Chicago)	Democratic	January 3, 1953 – January 3, 1969	83rd 84th 85th 86th 87th 88th 89th 90th	Elected in 1952. Re-elected in 1954. Re-elected in 1956. Re-elected in 1958. Re-elected in 1960. Re-elected in 1962. Re-elected in 1964. Re-elected in 1966. Lost renomination.	1967–1973 kept all of its previous territory except for a small area between 46th and 47th Streets near the lake, and added all of Calumet Township. It also added those portions of Thornton Township east of the Calumet Expressway as far south as 159th Street, and north of the Calumet River from 159th to the state line, as well as those parts of Dolton north of Sibley Boulevard bordered on the west by Lincoln Avenue from the Chicago city line to Irving Avenue and by Irving from there to Sibley.
Abner Mikva (Chicago)	Democratic	January 3, 1969 – January 3, 1973	91st 92nd	Elected in 1968. Re-elected in 1970. Redistricted to the 1st district but ran in the 10th district and lost re-election.	1967–1973 kept all of its previous territory except for a small area between 46th and 47th Streets near the lake, and added all of Calumet Township. It also added those portions of Thornton Township east of the Calumet Expressway as far south as 159th Street, and north of the Calumet River from 159th to the state line, as well as those parts of Dolton north of Sibley Boulevard bordered on the west by Lincoln Avenue from the Chicago city line to Irving Avenue and by Irving from there to Sibley.
Morgan F. Murphy (Chicago)	Democratic	January 3, 1973 – January 3, 1981	93rd 94th 95th 96th	Redistricted from the 3rd district and re-elected in 1972. Re-elected in 1974. Re-elected in 1976. Re-elected in 1978. Retired.	1973–1983; Pulled back within the Chicago city limits, and included: the communities of East Side, Hegewisch, Riverdale, South Chicago, South Deering and West Pullman; the part of South Shore bordered on the north by 75th Street (Stony Island to Jeffery), 73rd Street (Jeffery to Yates Boulevard) and 71st Street (Yates to the lake); those parts of Avalon Park and Calumet Heights east of Stony Island; those parts of Roseland and Pullman bordered on the north by 99th Street (Stewart Avenue to State Street) and 103rd Street (State to Stony Island); those parts of Beverly and Morgan Park east of Western Avenue; Washington Heights except for the portion northeast of 95th and Halsted; the part of Auburn Gresham west of Halsted; the part of Englewood southwest of 71st and Halsted; West Englewood except for the portion northeast of Marquette Road and Loomis Boulevard; the part of Chicago Lawn northeast of 63rd and California Avenue; and the part of Gage Park southeast of 55th and Western.
Gus Savage (Chicago)	Democratic	January 3, 1981 – January 3, 1993	97th 98th 99th 100th 101st 102nd	Elected in 1980. Re-elected in 1982. Re-elected in 1984. Re-elected in 1986. Re-elected in 1988. Re-elected in 1990. Lost renomination.	
Gus Savage (Chicago)	Democratic	January 3, 1981 – January 3, 1993	97th 98th 99th 100th 101st 102nd	Elected in 1980. Re-elected in 1982. Re-elected in 1984. Re-elected in 1986. Re-elected in 1988. Re-elected in 1990. Lost renomination.	1983–1993; Again extended into the suburbs, included the Chicago communities of East Side, Hegewisch, Riverdale, West Englewood and West Pullman, the part of South Shore southeast of 73rd and Yates, the parts of South Chicago and Calumet Heights east of Yates, South Deering except the portion northwest of 103rd and Yates, the parts of Roseland and Pullman south of 103rd, the eastern half of Morgan Park, the parts of Auburn Gresham and Washington Heights west of Halsted, almost all of Englewood west of Halsted, and the part of Chicago Lawn between 63rd and 69th Streets east of Western. The district included Calumet Township except for those parts of Blue Island and Calumet Park northwest of the railroad running from 123rd and Laflin to the western township line. The district also included the portion of Thornton Township bordered on the south by 167th Street from the western township line to the eastern edge of Hazel Crest, 171st Street from the Hazel Crest boundary to Halsted, 167th from Halsted to Indiana Avenue, Sibley Boulevard from Indiana Avenue to Torrence Avenue (with some minor variation in Calumet City), East State Street from Torrence to the railroad 1/4 mile east, 154th Street from the railroad to Freeland Avenue, and 155th Street from Freeland to the state line.
Mel Reynolds (Chicago)	Democratic	January 3, 1993 – October 1, 1995	103rd 104th	Elected in 1992. Re-elected in 1994. Resigned.	1993–2003; Included the Chicago communities of Riverdale and West Pullman; the part of South Shore southeast of 71st and Yates; the parts of South Chicago and Calumet Heights east of Yates; the part of South Deering southwest of 103rd and Yates except for the portion east of the Calumet River, as well as the area between Yates and Torrence Avenue from 95th Street extended south to 116th Street; the part of Hegewisch west of the Calumet River; the parts of Roseland and Pullman south of 103rd Street; most of Morgan Park east of Longwood Drive; the part of Beverly southeast of 103rd and Prospect Avenue; the parts of Auburn Gresham and Washington Heights west of Halsted; the part of Englewood southwest of 63rd and Halsted; and the part of West Englewood south of 63rd Street. Also included all of Calumet Township, as well as parts of Bloom, Bremen, Rich, Thornton and Worth Townships.
Vacant		October 1, 1995 – December 12, 1995	104th		
Jesse Jackson Jr. (Chicago)	Democratic	December 12, 1995 – November 21, 2012	104th 105th 106th 107th 108th 109th 110th 111th 112th	Elected to finish Reynolds's term. Re-elected in 1996. Re-elected in 1996. Re-elected in 2000. Re-elected in 2002. Re-elected in 2004. Re-elected in 2006. Re-elected in 2008. Re-elected in 2010. Re-elected in 2012 but resigned.	
Jesse Jackson Jr. (Chicago)	Democratic	December 12, 1995 – November 21, 2012	104th 105th 106th 107th 108th 109th 110th 111th 112th	Elected to finish Reynolds's term. Re-elected in 1996. Re-elected in 1996. Re-elected in 2000. Re-elected in 2002. Re-elected in 2004. Re-elected in 2006. Re-elected in 2008. Re-elected in 2010. Re-elected in 2012 but resigned.	2003–2013
Vacant		November 21, 2012 – April 9, 2013	112th 113th		2003–2013
Vacant		November 21, 2012 – April 9, 2013	112th 113th		2013–2023
Robin Kelly (Matteson)	Democratic	April 9, 2013– present	113th 114th 115th 116th 117th 118th 119th	Elected to finish Jackson's term. Re-elected in 2014. Re-elected in 2016. Re-elected in 2018. Re-elected in 2020. Re-elected in 2022. Re-elected in 2024. Retired to run for U.S Senate.	2013–2023
Robin Kelly (Matteson)	Democratic	April 9, 2013– present	113th 114th 115th 116th 117th 118th 119th	Elected to finish Jackson's term. Re-elected in 2014. Re-elected in 2016. Re-elected in 2018. Re-elected in 2020. Re-elected in 2022. Re-elected in 2024. Retired to run for U.S Senate.	2023–present
Donna Miller (Lynwood)	Democratic	Assuming office on January 3, 2027		Elected in 2026.	2023–present

== Election results ==
=== 2002 ===
Illinois's 2nd Congressional District Election (2002)
Party	Candidate	Votes	%
Democratic	Jesse Jackson, Jr.*	151,443	82.30
Republican	Doug Nelson	32,567	17.70
Total votes		184,010	100.00
Turnout			
Democratic hold			

=== 2004 ===
Illinois's 2nd Congressional District Election (2004)
Party	Candidate	Votes	%
Democratic	Jesse Jackson, Jr.*	202,176	88.34
Libertarian	Stephanie Sailor	26,693	11.66
Total votes		228,869	100.00
Turnout			
Democratic hold			

=== 2006 ===
Illinois's 2nd Congressional District Election (2006)
Party	Candidate	Votes	%
Democratic	Jesse Jackson, Jr.*	146,347	84.84
Republican	Robert Belin	20,395	11.82
Libertarian	Anthony W. Williams	5,748	3.33
Total votes		172,490	100.00
Turnout			
Democratic hold			

=== 2008 ===
Illinois's 2nd Congressional District Election (2008)
Party	Candidate	Votes	%
Democratic	Jesse Jackson, Jr.*	251,052	89.41
Republican	Anthony W. Williams	29,721	10.59
Total votes		280,773	100.00
Turnout			
Democratic hold			

=== 2010 ===
Illinois's 2nd Congressional District Election (2010)
Party	Candidate	Votes	%
Democratic	Jesse Jackson, Jr.*	150,666	80.52
Republican	Isaac Hayes	25,883	13.83
Green	Anthony W. Williams	10,564	5.65
Total votes		187,113	100.00
Turnout			
Democratic hold			

=== 2012 ===
Illinois's 2nd Congressional District Election (2012)
Party	Candidate	Votes	%
Democratic	Jesse Jackson, Jr.*	188,303	63.3
Republican	Brian Woodworth	69,115	23.2
Independent	Marcus Lewis	40,006	13.5
Total votes		297,424	100.00
Turnout			
Democratic hold			

=== 2013 (special) ===
Illinois's 2nd Congressional District Special Election (2013)
Party	Candidate	Votes	%
Democratic	Robin Kelly	58,142	70.8
Republican	Paul McKinley	18,072	22.0
Independent	Elizabeth "Liz" Pahlke	2,477	3.0
Green	LeAlan Jones	1,505	1.8
Independent	Marcus Lewis	1,345	1.6
Independent	Curtiss Llong Bey	539	0.7
Total votes		82,080	100.00
Turnout			
Democratic hold			

=== 2014 ===
Illinois 2nd Congressional District General Election, 2014
Party	Candidate	Votes	%
Democratic	Robin Kelly (incumbent)	160,337	78.49
Republican	Eric M. Wallace	43,799	21.44
Write-in votes	Marcus Lewis	130	0.06
Total votes		204,266	100.0
Democratic hold			

=== 2016 ===
Illinois 2nd Congressional District General Election, 2016
Party	Candidate	Votes	%
Democratic	Robin Kelly (incumbent)	235,051	79.81
Republican	John F Morrow	59,471	20.19
Total votes		294,522	100.0
Democratic hold			

=== 2018 ===
Illinois 2nd Congressional District General Election, 2018
Party	Candidate	Votes	%
Democratic	Robin Kelly (incumbent)	190,684	81.06
Republican	David Merkle	44,567	18.94
Total votes		235,251	100.0
Democratic hold			

=== 2020 ===
Illinois 2nd Congressional District General Election, 2020
Party	Candidate	Votes	%
Democratic	Robin Kelly (incumbent)	234,896	78.81
Republican	Theresa Raborn	63,142	21.19
Total votes		298,038	100.0
Democratic hold			

=== 2022 ===
Illinois 2nd Congressional District General Election, 2022
Party	Candidate	Votes	%
Democratic	Robin Kelly (incumbent)	140,414	67.13
Republican	Thomas Lynch	68,761	32.87
Total votes		209,175	100.0
Democratic hold			

=== 2024 ===
Illinois's 2nd congressional district, 2024
Party	Candidate	Votes	%	±%
Democratic	Robin Kelly (incumbent)	195,777	67.55	+0.42%
Republican	Ashley Ramos	94,004	32.43	—0.44%
Write-in		62	0.02	N/A
Total votes		289,843	100.0	
Democratic hold				

== See also ==
- Illinois's congressional districts
- List of United States congressional districts
