= Vermilion River (Illinois River tributary) =

River in Illinois, USA

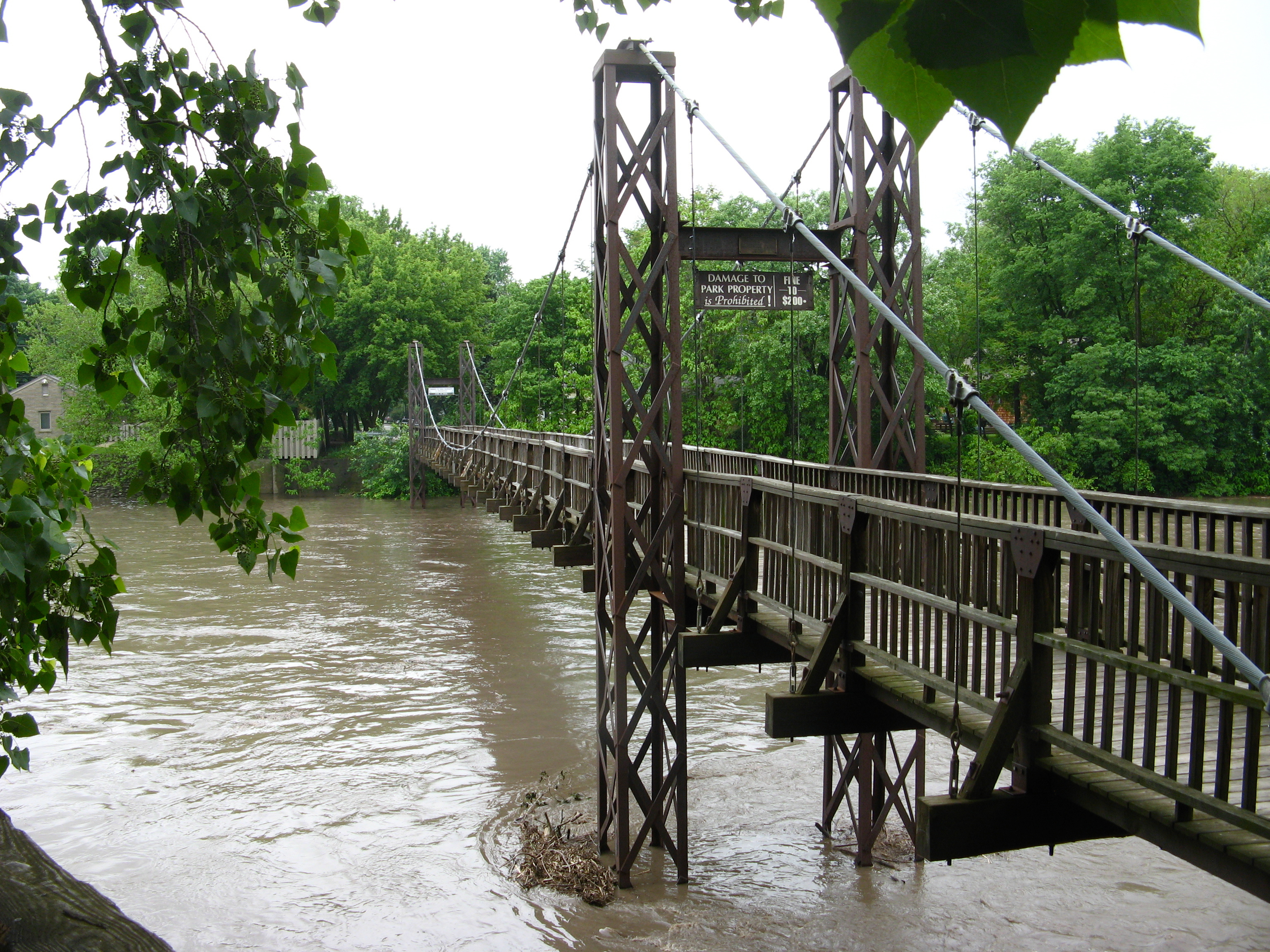

Physical characteristics
- Source
  - location: Confluence of the North Fork and South Fork, Avoca Township, Livingston County, Illinois
  - coordinates: 40°49′11″N 88°30′29″W
- Mouth
  - location: Confluence with the Illinois River, Oglesby, Illinois
  - coordinates: 41°19′10″N 89°04′04″W
  - elevation: 449 ft (137 m)
- Length: 109.6 mi (176.4 km)
- Discharge
  - location: Leonore, IL
  - average: 487 cu/ft. per sec.

Basin features
- Progression: Vermilion River → Illinois → Mississippi → Gulf of Mexico
- GNIS ID: 424127

The Vermilion River is a 109.6-mile-long (176.4 km) tributary of the Illinois River in the state of Illinois, United States. The river flows north, in contrast to a second Vermilion River in Illinois, which flows south to the Wabash River. The Illinois and Wabash rivers each have a tributary named the Little Vermilion River as well.

The north-flowing Vermilion River and the south-flowing Middle Fork Vermilion River run on what is close to a straight line between Oglesby and Danville. In presettlement times, the two rivers drained an upland marsh near Roberts. It is possible that early settlers regarded these as a single river that flowed in two directions. It is also possible that, in early settlement times, these rivers formed a canoe route between the Illinois River and Wabash River, with a portage through the marshes near Roberts. This may explain why the two rivers have the same name.

The north-flowing Vermilion flows in a northerly direction from its origin in Livingston and Ford counties in north central Illinois, eventually emptying into the Illinois River, near Oglesby. Perhaps it is best known for its stretch of whitewater between Lowell and Oglesby, Illinois, which is one of few found in Illinois.

Access to a stretch of river around a dam owned by Buzzi Unicem was temporarily barred in 2009 after two drowning deaths that occurred on June 23 and 26, respectively, as well as numerous other boating accidents. The river access was reopened in 2010.

== Cities and towns ==
The following cities and towns are drained by the Vermilion:

- Chatsworth
- Chenoa
- Cornell
- Fairbury
- Forrest
- Long Point
- Piper City
- Pontiac
- Streator

== Counties ==
The following counties are drained at least in part by the Vermilion River:

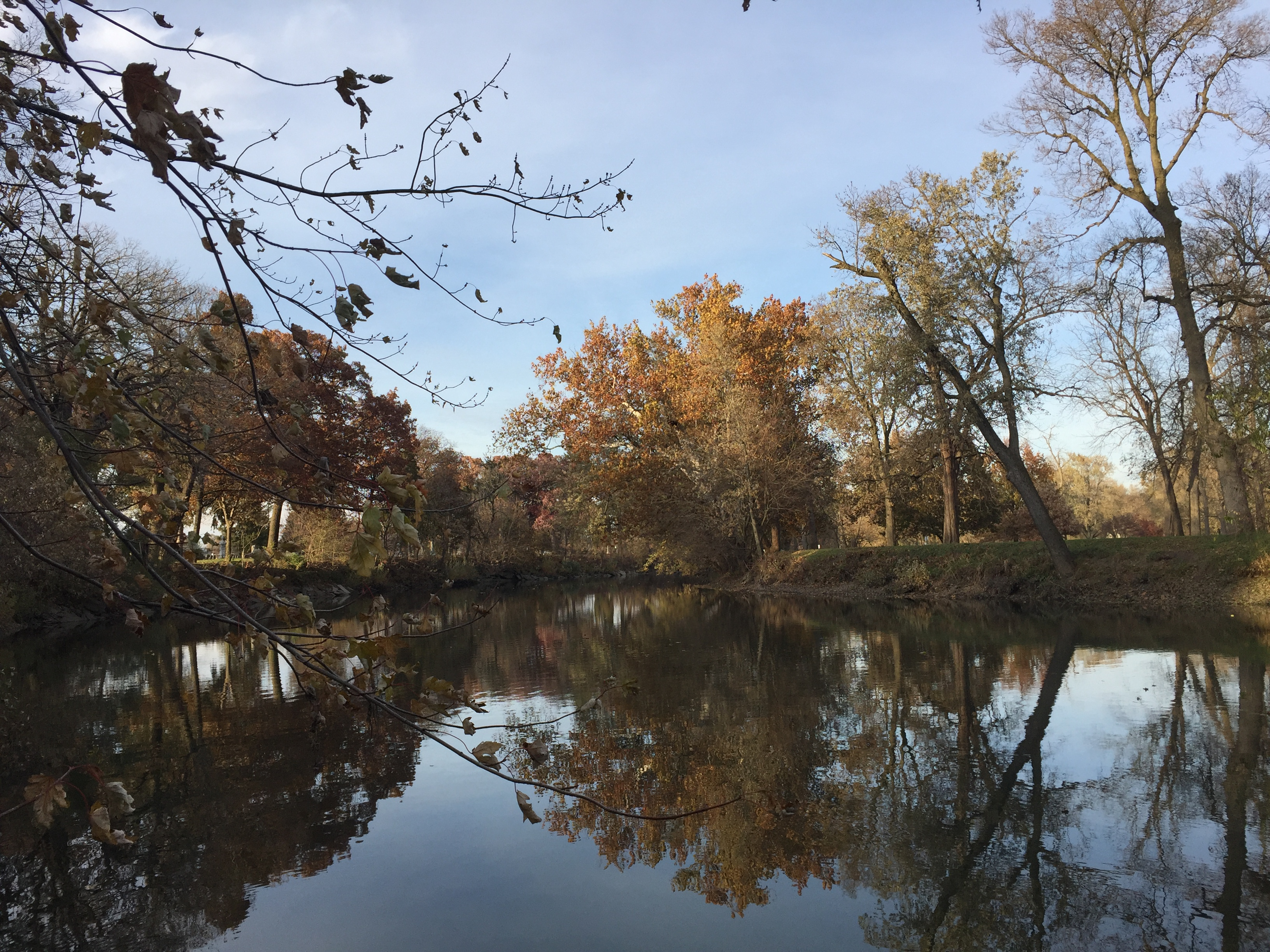
Vermilion River in Pontiac, Livingston County, IL

- Ford
- Iroquois
- LaSalle
- Livingston
- McLean
- Woodford

== Parks and access points ==
- Matthiessen State Park
- Sandy Ford Nature Preserve

Play Park, Pontiac https://www.pontiac.org/594/Play-Park

Humiston Woods http://www.humistonwoods.org/

Township park, Dropped pin Near Pontiac Township, IL 61764 https://www.google.com/maps?q=40.8982776,-88.6754253&hl=en-US&gl=us

McDowell Bridge, southeast of Pontiac, IL. RCJG+724 McDowell, Illinois

== See also ==
- List of Illinois rivers
