= Cayuga, Illinois =

- Unincorporated community
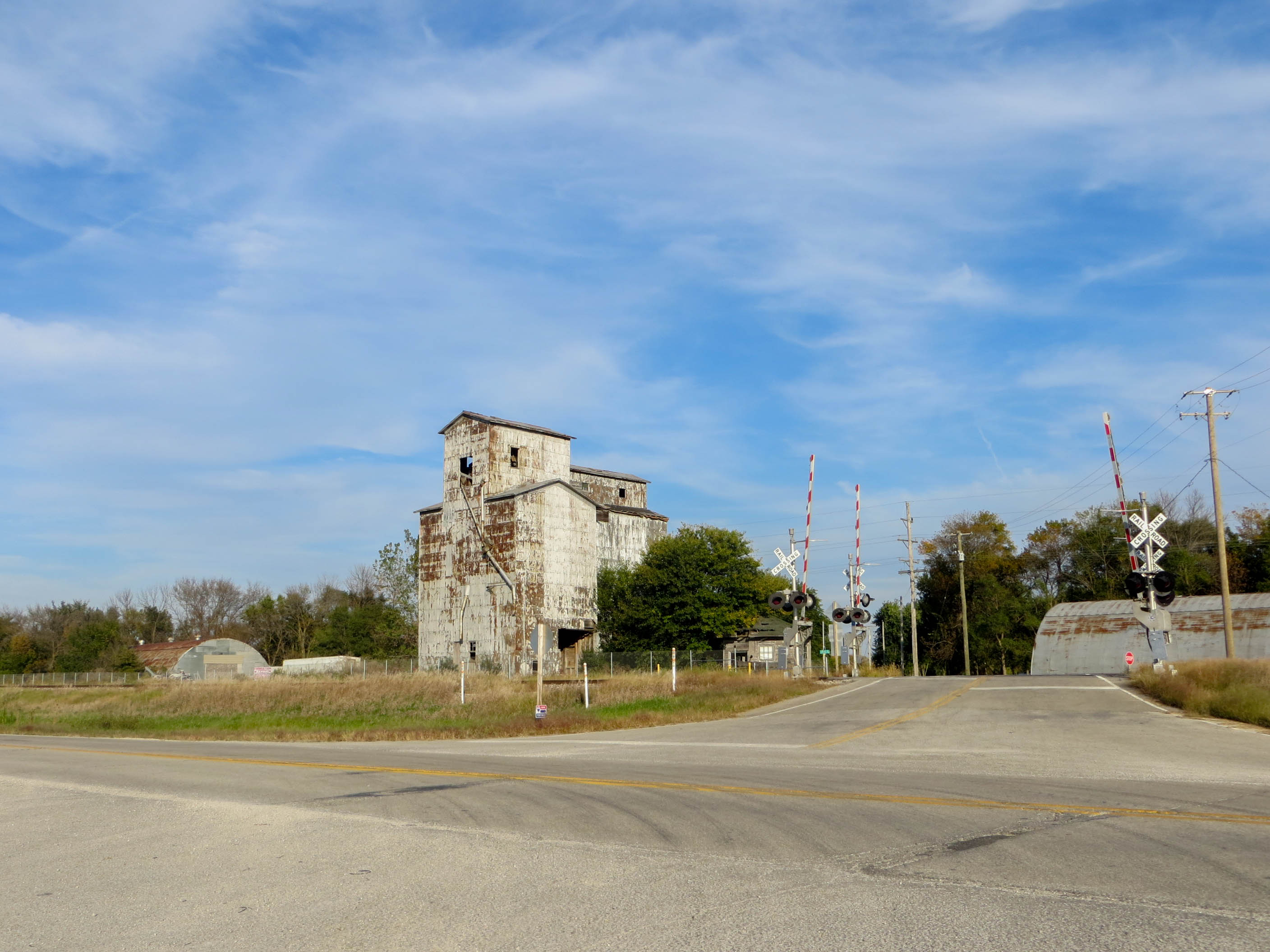
- Grain elevator in Cayuga

- Location in Illinois Location in the United States
- Coordinates: 40°56′28″N 88°35′01″W
- Country: United States
- State: Illinois
- County: Livingston
- Township: Odell
- Elevation: 689 ft (210 m)
- Time zone: UTC-6 (CST)
  - Summer (DST): UTC-5 (CDT)
- ZIP code: 61764
- GNIS feature ID: 405724

Cayuga is an unincorporated community in Livingston County, Illinois, United States, and is located northeast of Pontiac. Never that large to begin with, all that remains is an abandoned grain elevator and depot along the Union Pacific.

== History ==
The Chicago & Alton Railroad was built through the area in 1853. Cayuga was platted by Thomas F. Norton two years later, for Corydon Weed. Population peaked as a village with 160 people in 1898. What would become Route 66 was built along Cayuga in the 1910s. At one point there was a school and two churches, a Presbyterian and a Lutheran. The only documented owner of the grain elevator was the defunct Middle Division Elevator Co. By 1955 the population had dropped to only 60 people.

== Climate ==
The average high and low temperatures are 85 °F (29 °C) and 63 °F (17 °C), respectively, during the summer and 30 °F (−1 °C) and 17 °F (−8 °C), respectively, during the winter.
