= Avoca Township, Livingston County, Illinois =

Coordinates: 40°48′29″N 88°31′55″W

Avoca Township
- Township
- Location in Livingston County

- Livingston County's location in Illinois
- Country: United States
- State: Illinois
- County: Livingston
- Established: November 3, 1857

Area
  - Total: 36.41 sq mi (94.3 km^{2})
  - Land: 36.31 sq mi (94.0 km^{2})
  - Water: 0.10 sq mi (0.26 km^{2}) 0.27%

Population (2020)
  - Total: 417
  - Density: 11.5/sq mi (4.43/km^{2})
- Time zone: UTC-6 (CST)
  - Summer (DST): UTC-5 (CDT)
- FIPS code: 17-105-03194

Avoca Township is located in Livingston County, Illinois. As of the 2020 census, its population was 417 and it contained 151 housing units.

Avoca Township is situated in the southern part of Livingston County, and is bounded on the north by Owego Township, on the east by Pleasant Ridge Township, on the south by Indian Grove Township and on the west by Eppards Point. Avoca is drained by the Vermillion River. The confluence of the north and south branch of the river is near the center of the township. Avoca was once primarily prairie with about a quarter of the land in timber along the river. The land is now primarily agricultural.

== Geography ==
According to the 2021 census gazetteer files, Avoca Township has a total area of 36.41 square miles (94.30 km^{2}), of which 36.31 square miles (94.04 km^{2}) (or 99.73%) is land and 0.10 square miles (0.26 km^{2}) (or 0.27%) is water.

== Demographics ==
As of the 2020 census there were 417 people, 94 households, and 45 families residing in the township. The population density was 11.45 inhabitants per square mile (4.42/km^{2}). There were 151 housing units at an average density of 4.15 per square mile (1.60/km^{2}). The racial makeup of the township was 97.60% White, 0.00% African American, 0.00% Native American, 0.48% Asian, 0.00% Pacific Islander, 0.48% from other races, and 1.44% from two or more races. Hispanic or Latino of any race were 0.48% of the population.

There were 94 households, out of which 42.60% had children under the age of 18 living with them, 34.04% were married couples living together, 13.83% had a female householder with no spouse present, and 52.13% were non-families. 52.10% of all households were made up of individuals, and 17.00% had someone living alone who was 65 years of age or older. The average household size was 2.70 and the average family size was 4.56.

The township's age distribution consisted of 30.7% under the age of 18, 16.5% from 18 to 24, 23.2% from 25 to 44, 22.4% from 45 to 64, and 7.1% who were 65 years of age or older. The median age was 26.3 years. For every 100 females, there were 202.4 males. For every 100 females age 18 and over, there were 144.4 males.

The median income for a household in the township was $49,079, and the median income for a family was $106,302. Males had a median income of $42,135 versus $33,500 for females. The per capita income for the township was $28,720. None of the population was below the poverty line.

Historical population
Census	Pop.	Note	%±
2010	405		—
2020	417		3.0%
U.S. Decennial Census

== History ==
The name Avoca was given to the area by Nicholas Hefner, and means “the meeting of the waters,” the two branches of the Vermilion River uniting in this township.

The first permanent settler in the township was Isaac Jourdan, who came with his wife from Brown County, Illinois in December 1830. There were but two other families in Livingston County at that time. Four more families settled in the area the following spring – William Popejoy, John Hanneman, Uriah Blue and Abner Johnson.

The earliest settlers located in the timber along the Vermilion River. The method for making a claim in these days was by blazing the trees in the timber or staking it off on the prairie. The land was not surveyed until 1833. Every family squatted wherever they wanted, providing no one else had preceded them.

On May 5, 1832, William McDowell and his wife Sarah and their six children arrived from Indiana. The children included five sons (John, Woodford G., James, Hiram and Joseph B.) and one daughter.

The McDowell's immediately built a cabin. Their primary tool was an ax. They had brought with them a few panes of glass for a window. They purchased the boards for the door and window casing from the Kickapoo Indians located in nearby Oliver's Grove. The McDowell's would become and remain a prominent family in the history of the area.

In the latter part of May 1832, the Black Hawk War broke out in Illinois and the entire settlement in Avoca departed to their former homes. They returned in the fall of that year after the war ended.

In the fall of 1832 Charles Brooks and John Wright arrived from Indiana. On July 1, 1833, Charles Brooks and his wife had a son named Charles A. Brooks, who was the first child of any settler born in the township.

In 1833 the settlement was increased by the arrival of Isaac Burgit, M. B. Miller and Platt Thorn from New York state and Elijah Thompson and family from Indiana. Thompson settled on what, after the lands were surveyed, turned out to be a section set aside for a school. He sold out his improvements and moved on to Kankakee. His daughter, Ann, was married September 1833 to Harvey Rounsaville. William McDowell, who had been elected justice of the peace a few weeks prior, performed the ceremony. This was the first marriage in Avoca Township.

The first sermon preached in the township was at the McDowell cabin in the spring of 1833 by Rev. James Eckels. The first school was taught by Samuel Breese in the fall of 1835. The schoolhouse was a cabin, 16 x 18 feet, with a large wood fireplace. The building was paid for by Mrs. Sarah McDowell (her husband William had died in 1834), Nathan Popejoy and James Blake.

David Terhune and Harrison Fletcher arrived in the township in 1834. Fletcher was the first blacksmith and opened a shop on his claim late in the winter of that year. Other early settlers in the late 1830s included George Johnson, Nathan Popejoy, James Blake and Isaac Wilson.

In 1840 Joseph C. Morrison, Asa DeMoss and James DeMoss arrived with their families. James DeMoss was a carpenter who helped erect the first mill in the nearby town of Pontiac and assisted in building the first county courthouse.

The first post office was established in 1840 and was named Avoca. Nicholas Hefner was the first postmaster. The office was where the village of Avoca was afterward located and was on the mail route between Ottawa and Danville. The office was discontinued in 1864.

In 1850 Dr. C. B. Ostrander and his wife arrived from Chicago. They settled on a farm near Lodemia. Until the early 1860s he was the only physician in the area, his practice extended to the east and southern portions of Livingston County. During the 1850s the township was rapidly settled, with most locating in the timber along the river.

The first church in the township was completed in 1857. The building was 32 x 50 feet, 16 feet high between the floor and ceiling, lathed, plastered, and originally painted white, with black walnut seats and pulpit. The cost of construction was $2000 of which most was provided by Woodford McDowell.

The church was named by Mrs. Sarah McDowell. She was at the time the oldest settler and church member. The church was named the “Pioneer Methodist Episcopal Church.” In 1897, the church was torn down and the material hauled to Fairbury, Illinois, where it was converted into two small residences.

The first store in Avoca was kept by Woodford and James McDowell in 1854. The same year Woodford McDowell and his brothers built a steam sawmill, to which was attached one run of stones for grinding corn, but the main business of the mill was sawing lumber. Most of the lumber for the houses of the earlier settlers was obtained at this mill. The mill was moved to Fairbury in 1869.

The first bridge in the township was built over the south branch of the Vermillion River in 1844.

The village of Avoca was laid out in 1854 by Woodford G. McDowell, who owned the land upon which it was located. The store in the village had been doing business for several months prior to this time. The village was surveyed by Amos Edwards, the County Surveyor.

After the village of Fairbury (three miles south) was laid out in 1857, the little hamlet ceased to grow. The Fairbury, Pontiac and Northwestern Railroad was built in 1872 running through Avoca Township but bypassing the village of Avoca. Over the following years many of the houses were torn down and removed to Fairbury. Today there is not a mark standing to note where the village of Avoca once stood. The railroad, later known as the Wabash, no longer runs through the township.

In 1908, the township had three small communities each of which laid along the Wabash railroad line – McDowell, Lodemia and Champlin. The village of McDowell had a post office, Western Union telegraph, a train depot, a grain elevator, and a Methodist Episcopal church. Lodemia also had a post office, a Methodist Episcopal church and a railroad shipping station. Champlin had a shipping station.

The population of Avoca Township grew quickly when the area was first settled but has slowly declined over the decades. The population listed in the 1880 census was 871 with 174 housing units. Twenty years later the population was 814 with 161 housing units. The estimated population in 2016 was 387.

== Cemeteries ==
Avoca Cemetery, across the creek from the village of Avoca, was laid out in 1832 by William McDowell. Susan Phillips was the first person to be buried there, the interment taking place in 1833. William and Sarah McDowell, the early influential pioneers, are also buried there.

Patty Cemetery lies along the northern border of Avoca Township with Owego Township. Many of the early founding families of both Avoca and Owego Townships lie there.

== Communities ==
- Avoca
- McDowell
- Lodemia
- Champlin

== Points of Interest ==
Fugate Woods Nature Reserve
