= Odell Township =

Odell Township may refer to the following townships in the United States:

- Odell Township, Livingston County, Illinois
- Odell Township, New Hampshire in Coos County
