= Pontiac Township =

Pontiac Township may refer to the following townships in the United States:

- Pontiac Township, Livingston County, Illinois
- Pontiac Township, Michigan
