= Waldo Township =

Waldo Township may refer to the following townships in the United States:

- Waldo Township, Livingston County, Illinois
- Waldo Township, Russell County, Kansas
- Waldo Township, Marion County, Ohio
