= Blair, Livingston County, Illinois =

Blair, Illinois
- Unincorporated community
- Location within Illinois Location within the United States
- Coordinates: 41°06′12″N 88°18′31″W
- Country: United States
- State: Illinois
- County: Livingston
- Township: Round Grove
- Elevation: 614 ft (187 m)
- Time zone: UTC-6 (Central (CST))
  - Summer (DST): UTC-5 (CDT)
- Area codes: 815 & 779
- GNIS feature ID: 404540

Blair is an unincorporated community in Livingston County, Illinois, United States. Blair is 3 miles (4.8 km) west of Reddick.
