= Forrest Township, Livingston County, Illinois =

Coordinates: 40°43′26″N 88°24′20″W

Forrest Township
- Township
- Location in Livingston County

- Livingston County's location in Illinois
- Country: United States
- State: Illinois
- County: Livingston
- Established: 1861

Area
  - Total: 36.37 sq mi (94.2 km^{2})
  - Land: 36.36 sq mi (94.2 km^{2})
  - Water: 0.00 sq mi (0 km^{2}) 0.01%

Population (2020)
  - Total: 1,408
  - Density: 38.72/sq mi (14.95/km^{2})
- Time zone: UTC-6 (CST)
  - Summer (DST): UTC-5 (CDT)
- FIPS code: 17-105-27039

Forrest Township is located in Livingston County, Illinois. As of the 2020 census, its population was 1,408 and it contained 605 housing units.

== History ==
Forrest Township was created from Chatsworth Township in 1861 as Forrestville Township. The name was changed to Forrest Township in 1865.

== Geography ==
According to the 2021 census gazetteer files, Forrest Township has a total area of 36.37 square miles (94.20 km^{2}), of which 36.36 square miles (94.17 km^{2}) (or 99.99%) is land and 0.00 square miles (0.00 km^{2}) (or 0.01%) is water.

== Demographics ==
As of the 2020 census there were 1,408 people, 602 households, and 469 families residing in the township. The population density was 38.72 inhabitants per square mile (14.95/km^{2}). There were 605 housing units at an average density of 16.64 per square mile (6.42/km^{2}). The racial makeup of the township was 90.06% White, 0.36% African American, 0.28% Native American, 0.14% Asian, 0.00% Pacific Islander, 4.33% from other races, and 4.83% from two or more races. Hispanic or Latino of any race were 7.95% of the population.

There were 602 households, out of which 35.70% had children under the age of 18 living with them, 57.14% were married couples living together, 17.94% had a female householder with no spouse present, and 22.09% were non-families. 20.90% of all households were made up of individuals, and 7.50% had someone living alone who was 65 years of age or older. The average household size was 2.48 and the average family size was 2.84.

The township's age distribution consisted of 25.0% under the age of 18, 8.6% from 18 to 24, 25.3% from 25 to 44, 29.8% from 45 to 64, and 11.3% who were 65 years of age or older. The median age was 35.9 years. For every 100 females, there were 85.2 males. For every 100 females age 18 and over, there were 73.6 males.

The median income for a household in the township was $76,413, and the median income for a family was $90,145. Males had a median income of $65,329 versus $26,188 for females. The per capita income for the township was $31,048. About 5.5% of families and 7.5% of the population were below the poverty line, including 12.4% of those under age 18 and 0.0% of those age 65 or over.

Historical population
Census	Pop.	Note	%±
2010	1,605		—
2020	1,408		−12.3%
U.S. Decennial Census
