= Odell, Illinois =

- Village
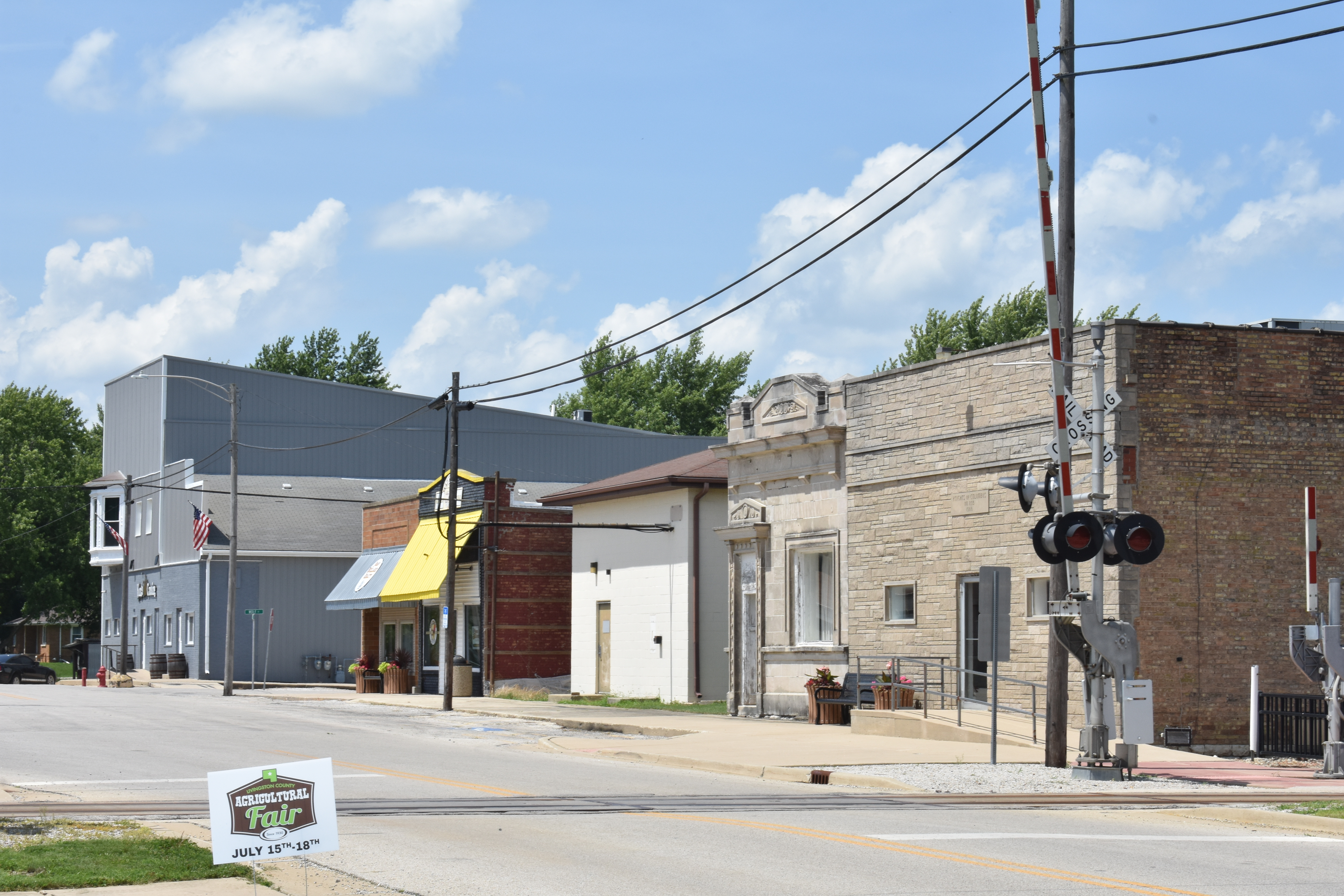
- Downtown Odell

- Location in Livingston County, Illinois
- Coordinates: 41°00′04″N 88°31′22″W
- Country: United States
- State: Illinois
- County: Livingston
- Township: Odell
- Founded: 1856
- Founder: Sydney S. Morgan
- Named for: William H. Odell

Government
  - Village President: Josh Osborne

Area
  - Total: 1.09 sq mi (2.83 km^{2})
  - Land: 1.08 sq mi (2.79 km^{2})
  - Water: 0.015 sq mi (0.04 km^{2})
- Elevation: 712 ft (217 m)

Population (2020)
  - Total: 1,003
  - Estimate (2024): 983
  - Density: 930/sq mi (360/km^{2})
- Time zone: UTC−6 (CST)
  - Summer (DST): UTC−5 (CDT)
- ZIP code: 60460
- Area codes: 815 & 779
- FIPS code: 17-55171
- GNIS feature ID: 2399558
- Website: odell-il.com

Odell is a village in Livingston County, Illinois, United States. As of the 2020 census, Odell had a population of 1,003.

== History ==
=== Founding ===
Odell was laid out by Sydney S. Morgan (1823 – 1884) and Henry A. Gardner (1816 – 1875) on August 10, 1856. Both men were civil engineers who had worked on the survey and construction of what soon became the Chicago and Alton Railroad. For a time Sydney S. Morgan divided his time between Joliet and Odell, but soon settled in Odell on a permanent basis where he became the town's chief promoter. Gardner was born in Berkshire County, Massachusetts, and had begun his railroad career working as a rodman on an extension of the Great Western Railroad in Massachusetts. He rose quickly through the ranks until he became chief engineer of the Mohawk and Hudson Railroad. Gardner came west in 1853 to work as assistant engineer to Oliver H. Lee on the Chicago and Mississippi Railroad. He purchased land near Dwight and later went on to become Chief Engineer on the Michigan Central Railroad. Gardner was never a resident of Odell.

The town was platted when it became clear that the railroad would pass through Morgan's and Gardner's land. The railroad was originally known as the Chicago and Mississippi, but quickly became the Chicago, Alton and St. Louis, and then the Chicago and Alton. An excursion train ran through the town on July 4, 1854, and regular service began in August 1854. Before the coming of the railroad, the land which became Odell Township was completely unsettled. Between 1852 and 1855 almost all of the land in the township was entered, and farms were rapidly developed. The land on which the town would soon be erected had been first purchased from the government by James C. Spencer and Henry A. Gardner on May 4, 1853. Through a series of quick transactions, Spencer sold his land to William H. Odell who then transferred it to Sydney S. Morgan.

=== Original design ===
The town was surveyed by Thomas F. Norton, deputy surveyor of Livingston County. The railroad had been granted a 100-foot-wide (30 m) swath of land extending diagonally through the town. This presented a problem in town design, which was solved at Odell by aligning the entire original town with the tracks. A similar problem was presented by several towns along this railroad. Unlike the Toledo, Peoria and Western Railroad, built through Livingston County at about the same time, a standard plan with shared street names does not seem to have been used along the Chicago and Mississippi. Lots sold from twenty to thirty dollars, with twenty being more common. Where the tracks passed through the town, the land used by the railroad was widened an additional 100 yards on both sides of the tracks, to create railroad grounds, although at Odell they were not labeled as such. This kind of widening of railroad property at townsites was a common feature of railroad towns built in the 1850s and may be seen at places like Dwight, Towanda, McLean, Fairbury and Chatsworth; it became less common with later railroad towns. The depot at Odell was on the north side of the tracks and the two early elevators on the south side. The original town included 24 numbered blocks, each of which contained up to 20 lots. There was no central public square designated on the plat. The original town plan remains substantially unaltered to this day.

=== Early growth ===
The first sign of activity at the site of the new town was the building of a siding and a tank. For the first year the only inhabitants of the place were railroad employees who manned the station and kept water in the tank. Daniel Smith, of New York, was the first station master. Slowly a few local merchants were attracted to the townsite; some came from the now-defunct town of New Michigan in northern Livingston County. David Williams put up a shack and began to sell "a few basketfuls of groceries and notions". He soon gave up and returned to New Michigan. The railroad erected a small warehouse that was rented out for use as a grocery store. The first dwelling in Odell was erected by Sydney S. Morgan for the use of Thomas Lyon. Morgan also began buying grain from local farmers. In the fall of 1857 A.A. Streator built a small hotel. In the same year a grain elevator and a school were erected. By the spring of 1858 Odell had about 100 people. On February 8, 1867, the town of Odell was officially organized.

=== Becoming a highway town ===
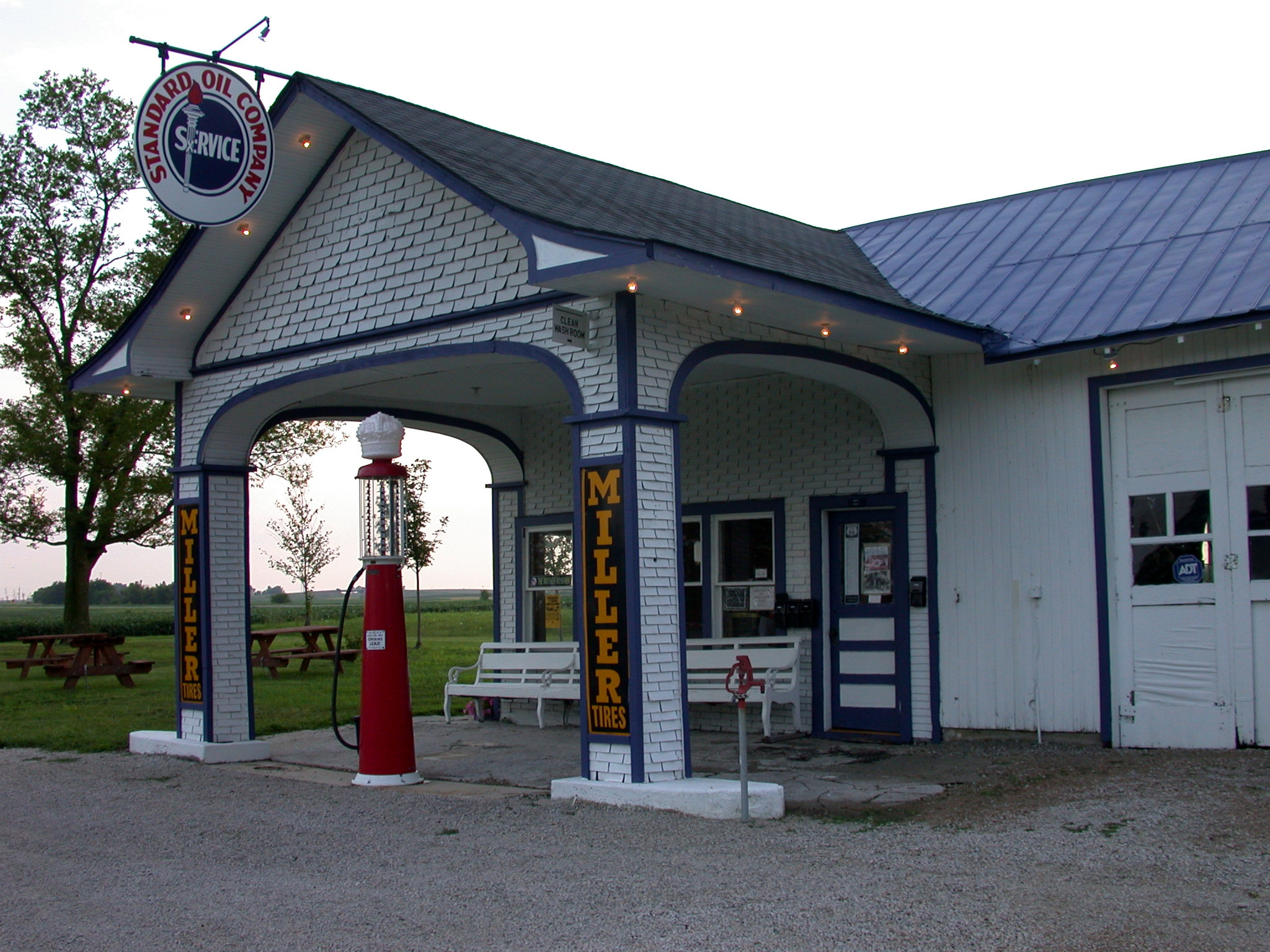
Standard Oil Gasoline Station was a typical gas station along U.S. Route 66.

Early Odell was a railroad town and a grain collection point. It was surrounded by some of the richest agricultural land in the United States. By the late 1870s over a million and a half bushels of grain were being shipped from Odell. In 1877 a newspaper, the Odell Herald, was established. In May 1886 several buildings in Odell were destroyed by a powerful tornado. By 1900 there were 1,000 people in the town, and since that date its population has remained at about that number. The major change came not in population, but in transportation, as Odell made the transition from a railroad town to a highway town. In 1921 the state put under contract a highway paving project for what at first was known as the "Chicago-Springfield East St. Louis Road". Paving was finished through Odell in 1922. The designation of the road was soon changed to Route 4. In 1926, what was substantially the same road became Route 66. At first all of these roads passed through the center of Odell, and by 1933 the local citizens became so frustrated by the inability of people to cross the road that they constructed a pedestrian underpass beneath the highway. In 1946 the problem was eased when a bypass was built around the town. In 1932 Patrick O'Donnell built the Standard Oil and Gasoline Station to serve traffic along the highway; this building has been carefully restored to become a popular stop for visitors touring Route 66. The station was added to the National Register of Historic Places in 1997. In 1964 the first stage of Interstate 55 was completed past Odell. It was improved in the 1970s. This highway substantially paralleled both the earlier roads and the original route of the Chicago and Mississippi Railroad.

== Geography ==
Odell is in northern Livingston County, in the northern part of Odell Township. Interstate 55 passes north and west of the village, with access from Exit 209. I-55 leads northeast 9 miles (14 km) to Dwight and 87 miles (140 km) to downtown Chicago, while to the southwest it leads 11 miles (18 km) to Pontiac, the Livingston county seat, and 48 miles (77 km) to Bloomington. Historic US 66 passes through the northwest side of the village, on a bypass predating I-55.

According to the 2021 census gazetteer files, Odell has a total area of 1.09 square miles (2.82 km^{2}), of which 1.08 square miles (2.80 km^{2}) (or 98.45%) is land and 0.02 square miles (0.05 km^{2}) (or 1.55%) is water.

== Demographics ==
Historical population
Census	Pop.	Note	%±
1870	739		—
1880	908		22.9%
1890	800		−11.9%
1900	1,000		25.0%
1910	1,035		3.5%
1920	1,069		3.3%
1930	908		−15.1%
1940	927		2.1%
1950	908		−2.0%
1960	936		3.1%
1970	1,076		15.0%
1980	1,083		0.7%
1990	1,030		−4.9%
2000	1,014		−1.6%
2010	1,046		3.2%
2020	1,003		−4.1%
U.S. Decennial Census

As of the 2020 census there were 1,003 people, 339 households, and 217 families residing in the village. The population density was 916.82 inhabitants per square mile (353.99/km^{2}). There were 441 housing units at an average density of 403.11 per square mile (155.64/km^{2}). Of the 441 housing units, 6.3% were vacant. The homeowner vacancy rate was 1.8% and the rental vacancy rate was 4.4%.

The racial makeup of the village was 93.72% White, 0.70% African American, 0.00% Native American, 0.00% Asian, 0.00% Pacific Islander, 0.90% from other races, and 4.69% from two or more races. Hispanic or Latino of any race were 3.49% of the population.

There were 339 households, out of which 47.8% had children under the age of 18 living with them, 43.07% were married couples living together, 12.09% had a female householder with no husband present, and 35.99% were non-families. 28.61% of all households were made up of individuals, and 17.99% had someone living alone who was 65 years of age or older. The average household size was 3.08 and the average family size was 2.56.

The village's age distribution consisted of 29.0% under the age of 18, 8.7% from 18 to 24, 22.6% from 25 to 44, 24.8% from 45 to 64, and 15.0% who were 65 years of age or older. The median age was 36.7 years. For every 100 females, there were 87.3 males. For every 100 females age 18 and over, there were 83.6 males.

The median income for a household in the village was $44,792, and the median income for a family was $66,528. Males had a median income of $42,708 versus $25,500 for females. The per capita income for the village was $32,884. About 13.8% of families and 17.9% of the population were below the poverty line, including 20.2% of those under age 18 and 18.5% of those age 65 or over.

Racial composition as of the 2020 census
Race	Number	Percent
White	940	93.7%
Black or African American	7	0.7%
American Indian and Alaska Native	0	0.0%
Asian	0	0.0%
Native Hawaiian and Other Pacific Islander	0	0.0%
Some other race	9	0.9%
Two or more races	47	4.7%
Hispanic or Latino (of any race)	35	3.5%

== Media ==
In October 2006, Odell was featured on the USA Food Network's "Riding Old Route 66", which visited the Standard Oil station.

== Notable persons ==
- Leslie Allen, racing driver
- Bernard Jean Bettelheim, missionary and pharmacist
- Bud Clancy, first baseman for the Chicago White Sox, Brooklyn Dodgers and Philadelphia Phillies
- Kenneth Raisbeck, playwright and screenwriter
- Mac Speedie, NFL player and coach, born in Odell
