= Esmen Township, Livingston County, Illinois =

Coordinates: 40°58′52″N 88°38′39″W

Esmen Township
- Township
- Location in Livingston County

- Livingston County's location in Illinois
- Country: United States
- State: Illinois
- County: Livingston
- Established: November 3, 1857

Area
  - Total: 36.17 sq mi (93.7 km^{2})
  - Land: 36.17 sq mi (93.7 km^{2})
  - Water: 0 sq mi (0 km^{2}) 0%

Population (2020)
  - Total: 338
  - Density: 9.34/sq mi (3.61/km^{2})
- Time zone: UTC-6 (CST)
  - Summer (DST): UTC-5 (CDT)
- FIPS code: 17-105-24426

Esmen Township is located in Livingston County, Illinois. As of the 2020 census, its population was 338 and it contained 141 housing units.

== Geography ==
According to the 2021 census gazetteer files, Esmen Township has a total area of 36.17 square miles (93.68 km^{2}), all land.

== Demographics ==
As of the 2020 census there were 338 people, 130 households, and 88 families residing in the township. The population density was 9.35 inhabitants per square mile (3.61/km^{2}). There were 141 housing units at an average density of 3.90 per square mile (1.51/km^{2}). The racial makeup of the township was 87.28% White, 2.66% African American, 0.00% Native American, 0.00% Asian, 0.00% Pacific Islander, 2.07% from other races, and 7.99% from two or more races. Hispanic or Latino of any race were 8.28% of the population.

There were 130 households, out of which 52.30% had children under the age of 18 living with them, 63.08% were married couples living together, 3.08% had a female householder with no spouse present, and 32.31% were non-families. 27.70% of all households were made up of individuals, and 23.80% had someone living alone who was 65 years of age or older. The average household size was 2.71 and the average family size was 3.45.

The township's age distribution consisted of 34.9% under the age of 18, 0.6% from 18 to 24, 36% from 25 to 44, 13.3% from 45 to 64, and 15.1% who were 65 years of age or older. The median age was 31.4 years. For every 100 females, there were 170.8 males. For every 100 females age 18 and over, there were 108.2 males.

The median income for a household in the township was $66,250, and the median income for a family was $75,667. Males had a median income of $41,528 versus $36,786 for females. The per capita income for the township was $25,456. About 21.6% of families and 23.9% of the population were below the poverty line, including 36.6% of those under age 18 and 3.8% of those age 65 or over.

Historical population
Census	Pop.	Note	%±
2010	326		—
2020	338		3.7%
U.S. Decennial Census
