= Livingston County, Illinois =

County in Illinois, United States

- County
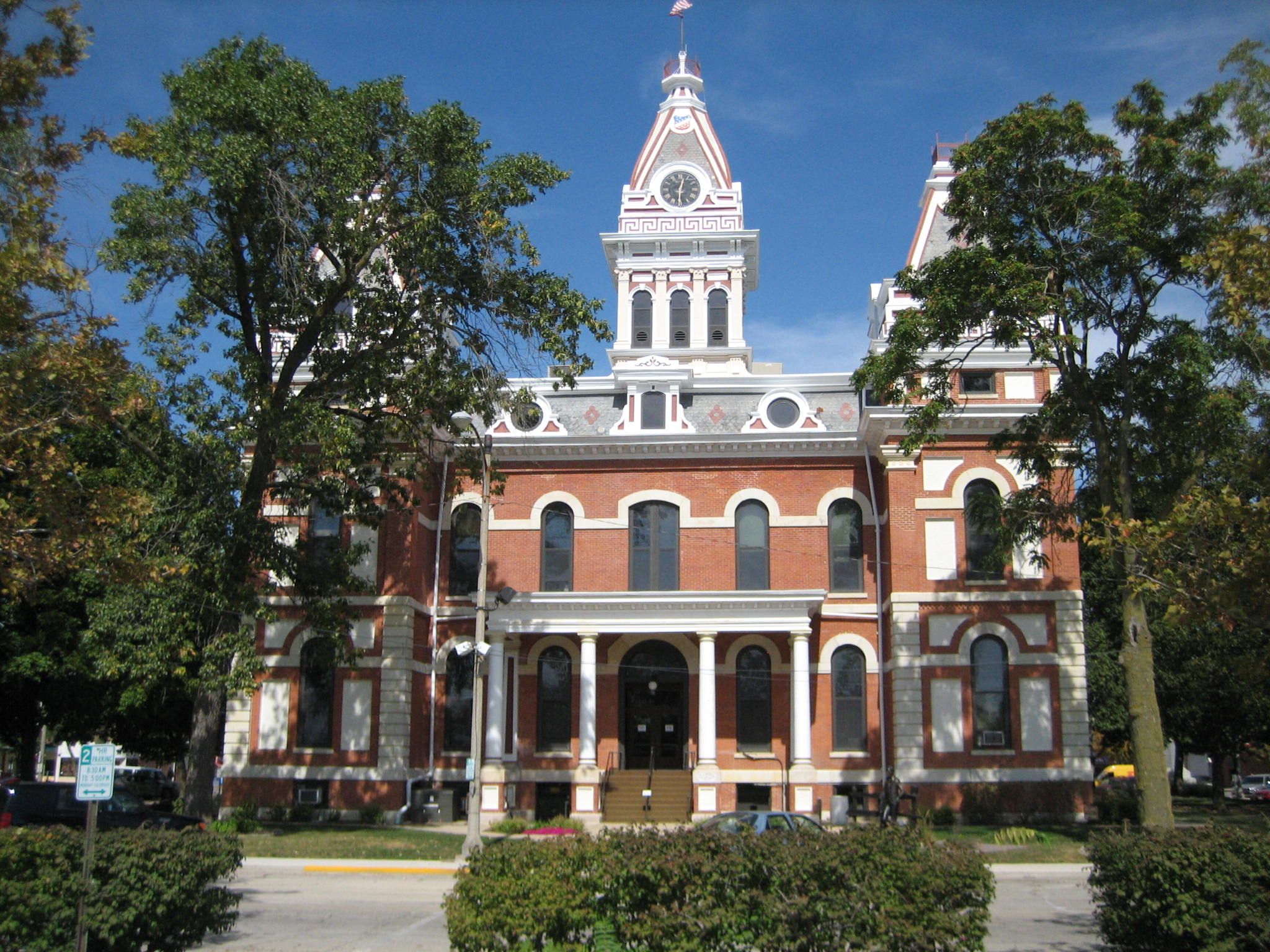
- Livingston County Courthouse

- Location within the U.S. state of Illinois
- Coordinates: 40°53′N 88°34′W
- Country: United States
- State: Illinois
- Founded: 1837
- Named for: Edward Livingston
- Seat: Pontiac
- Largest city: Pontiac

Area
  - Total: 1,046 sq mi (2,710 km^{2})
  - Land: 1,044 sq mi (2,700 km^{2})
  - Water: 1.6 sq mi (4.1 km^{2}) 0.2%

Population (2020)
  - Total: 35,815
  - Estimate (2025): 35,057 ▼
  - Density: 34.31/sq mi (13.25/km^{2})
- Time zone: UTC−6 (Central)
  - Summer (DST): UTC−5 (CDT)
- Congressional districts: 2nd, 16th
- Website: www.livingstoncountyil.gov

Livingston County is a county located in the U.S. state of Illinois. According to the 2020 census, it has a population of 35,815. Its county seat is Pontiac. Livingston County comprises the Pontiac, IL Micropolitan Statistical Area, which is combined with the Bloomington–Normal metropolitan statistical area as the Bloomington-Pontiac, IL Combined Statistical Area in the upper portion of Central Illinois.

== History ==
On October 27, 1830, Valentine Darnell and his wife Rachel became the first white settlers of Livingston County. Livingston was established on February 27, 1837. It was formed from parts of McLean, LaSalle, and Iroquois counties, and named after Edward Livingston, a prominent politician who was mayor of New York City and represented New York in the United States House of Representatives and Louisiana in both houses of Congress. He later served as Andrew Jackson's Secretary of State and as Minister to France. Although he had no connections to Illinois, the General Assembly found him accomplished enough to name a county after him.

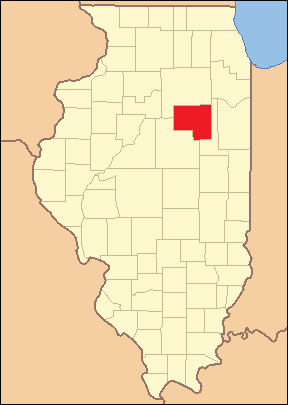
Livingston County at the time of its creation in 1837

== Geography ==
According to the U.S. Census Bureau, the county has a total area of 1,046 square miles (2,710 km^{2}), of which 1,044 square miles (2,700 km^{2}) is land and 1.6 square miles (4.1 km^{2}) (0.2%) is water. It is the fourth-largest county in Illinois by land area.

=== Climate and weather ===
Pontiac, Illinois

Climate chart (precipitation, max. and min. temperature)
J	F	M	A	M	J	J	A	S	O	N	D
1.6 30 14	1.4 36 18	2.8 48 29	3.4 62 39	3.8 73 50	4.1 82 60	4.1 85 64	3.6 83 62	3 77 54	2.7 65 42	3 49 31	2.5 35 20
- █ Average max. and min. temperatures in °F
- █ Precipitation totals in inches
- Source: The Weather Channel
Metric conversion
J	F	M	A	M	J	J	A	S	O	N	D
41 −1 −10	37 2 −8	72 9 −2	87 17 4	97 23 10	104 28 16	103 29 18	90 28 17	77 25 12	68 18 6	77 9 −1	64 2 −7
- █ Average max. and min. temperatures in °C
- █ Precipitation totals in mm

In recent years, average temperatures in the county seat of Pontiac have ranged from a low of 14 °F (−10.0 °C) in January to a high of 85 °F (29.4 °C) in July, although a record low of −24 °F (−31.1 °C) was recorded in January 1927. A record high of 108 °F (42.2 °C) was recorded in July 1936. Average monthly precipitation ranged from 1.44 inches (36.6 mm) in February to 4.11 inches (104.4 mm) in June.

=== Transit ===
- SHOW Bus
- Pontiac station

=== Major highways ===
- I-55
- US 24
- IL 17
- IL 18
- IL 23
- IL 47
- IL 116
- IL 170

=== Adjacent counties ===
- LaSalle County - northwest
- Grundy County - north
- Kankakee County - northeast
- Ford County - southeast
- McLean County - southwest
- Woodford County - west

== Demographics ==
Historical population
Census	Pop.	Note	%±
1840	759		—
1850	1,552		104.5%
1860	11,637		649.8%
1870	31,471		170.4%
1880	38,450		22.2%
1890	38,455		0.0%
1900	42,035		9.3%
1910	40,465		−3.7%
1920	39,070		−3.4%
1930	39,092		0.1%
1940	38,838		−0.6%
1950	37,809		−2.6%
1960	40,341		6.7%
1970	40,690		0.9%
1980	41,381		1.7%
1990	39,301		−5.0%
2000	39,678		1.0%
2010	38,950		−1.8%
2020	35,815		−8.0%
2025 (est.)	35,057	▼	−2.1%
U.S. Decennial Census; 1790-1960 1900-1990; 1990-2000 2010-2013

=== 2020 census ===
As of the 2020 census, the county had a population of 35,815. The median age was 42.4 years, with 21.9% of residents under the age of 18 and 20.0% of residents aged 65 or older. For every 100 females there were 106.9 males, and for every 100 females age 18 and over there were 105.8 males age 18 and over.

The racial makeup of the county was 89.5% White, 3.1% Black or African American, 0.2% American Indian and Alaska Native, 0.5% Asian, <0.1% Native Hawaiian and Pacific Islander, 2.1% from some other race, and 4.6% from two or more races. Hispanic or Latino residents of any race comprised 5.2% of the population.

35.4% of residents lived in urban areas, while 64.6% lived in rural areas.

There were 14,396 households in the county, of which 27.5% had children under the age of 18 living in them. Of all households, 47.5% were married-couple households, 20.1% were households with a male householder and no spouse or partner present, and 25.0% were households with a female householder and no spouse or partner present. About 30.8% of all households were made up of individuals, and 14.7% had someone living alone who was 65 years of age or older.

There were 15,920 housing units, of which 9.6% were vacant. Among occupied housing units, 73.3% were owner-occupied, and 26.7% were renter-occupied. The homeowner vacancy rate was 2.5%, and the rental vacancy rate was 8.4%.

=== Racial and ethnic composition ===
Livingston County, Illinois – Racial and ethnic composition Note: the US Census treats Hispanic/Latino as an ethnic category. This table excludes Latinos from the racial categories and assigns them to a separate category. Hispanics/Latinos may be of any race.
Race / Ethnicity (NH = Non-Hispanic)	Pop 1980	Pop 1990	Pop 2000	Pop 2010	Pop 2020	% 1980	% 1990	% 2000	% 2010	% 2020
White alone (NH)	38,790	36,171	36,145	34,903	31,518	93.74%	92.04%	91.10%	89.61%	88.00%
Black or African American alone (NH)	1,807	2,091	2,032	1,887	1,081	4.37%	5.32%	5.12%	4.84%	3.02%
Native American or Alaska Native alone (NH)	35	57	60	51	38	0.08%	0.15%	0.15%	0.13%	0.11%
Asian alone (NH)	92	127	121	197	171	0.22%	0.32%	0.30%	0.51%	0.48%
Native Hawaiian or Pacific Islander alone (NH)	x	x	2	1	1	x	x	0.01%	0.00%	0.00%
Other race alone (NH)	36	29	11	29	89	0.09%	0.07%	0.03%	0.07%	0.25%
Mixed race or Multiracial (NH)	x	x	251	350	1,058	x	x	0.63%	0.90%	2.95%
Hispanic or Latino (any race)	621	826	1,056	1,532	1,859	1.50%	2.10%	2.66%	3.93%	5.19%
Total	41,381	39,301	39,678	38,950	35,815	100.00%	100.00%	100.00%	100.00%	100.00%

=== 2010 census ===
As of the 2010 United States census, there were 38,950 people, 14,613 households, and 9,741 families residing in the county. The population density was 37.3 inhabitants per square mile (14.4/km^{2}). There were 15,895 housing units at an average density of 15.2 per square mile (5.9/km^{2}). The racial makeup of the county was 91.8% white, 4.9% black or African American, 0.5% Asian, 0.2% American Indian, 1.3% from other races, and 1.3% from two or more races. Those of Hispanic or Latino origin made up 3.9% of the population. In terms of ancestry, 36.6% were German, 17.2% were Irish, 11.2% were American, 10.7% were English, and 5.1% were Italian.

Of the 14,613 households, 30.7% had children under the age of 18 living with them, 52.0% were married couples living together, 9.9% had a female householder with no husband present, 33.3% were non-families, and 28.6% of all households were made up of individuals. The average household size was 2.43, and the average family size was 2.98. The median age was 40.8 years.

The median household income in the county was $50,500, and the median family income was $60,933. Males had a median income of $44,639 versus $32,234 for females. The county's per capita income was $23,259. About 9.1% of families and 11.0% of the population were below the poverty line, including 15.4% of those under age 18 and 6.9% of those age 65 or over.

== Communities ==
=== Cities ===
- Fairbury
- Pontiac
- Streator

=== Town ===
- Chatsworth

=== Villages ===
- Campus
- Cornell
- Cullom
- Dwight
- Emington
- Flanagan
- Forrest
- Long Point
- Odell
- Reddick
- Saunemin
- Strawn

=== Townships ===
Livingston County is divided into thirty townships:

- Amity
- Avoca
- Belle Prairie
- Broughton
- Charlotte
- Chatsworth
- Dwight
- Eppards Point
- Esmen
- Fayette
- Forrest
- Germanville
- Indian Grove
- Long Point
- Nebraska
- Nevada
- Newtown
- Odell
- Owego
- Pike
- Pleasant Ridge
- Pontiac
- Reading
- Rooks Creek
- Round Grove
- Saunemin
- Sullivan
- Sunbury
- Union
- Waldo

=== Unincorporated communities ===
- Ancona
- Blackstone
- Blair
- Budd
- Cayuga
- Charlotte
- Graymont
- Manville
- Nevada

== Government and infrastructure ==
The Illinois Department of Corrections operates two prisons in the county.

Pontiac Correctional Center is located in Pontiac. Pontiac houses the male death row. Before the January 11, 2003, commutation of death row sentences, male death row inmates were housed in Pontiac, Menard, and Tamms correctional centers. Dwight Correctional Center is within Nevada Township in an unincorporated area in the county.

The Dwight Correctional Center is currently unoccupied and was closed in 2013.

=== Politics ===
Although it was solidly Democratic before 1856, Livingston has since always been a powerfully Republican county. The solitary Democrat to win a majority of the county's vote since the Civil War has been Franklin D. Roosevelt in his 1932 landslide triumph over Herbert Hoover. Apart from the 1912 election, when Woodrow Wilson defeated a mortally divided Republican Party, Livingston has consistently voted Republican since the party's founding in 1856. Since 1940, only Lyndon Johnson in his 1964 landslide victory over the conservative Barry Goldwater has won more than forty percent of the county's vote.

United States presidential election results for Livingston County, Illinois
Year	Republican		Democratic		Third party(ies)	
Year	No.	%	No.	%	No.	%
1892	3,980	46.58%	3,960	46.34%	605	7.08%
1896	5,436	55.97%	4,068	41.89%	208	2.14%
1900	5,805	56.87%	4,024	39.42%	378	3.70%
1904	6,018	63.58%	2,785	29.42%	662	6.99%
1908	5,358	55.84%	3,778	39.37%	460	4.79%
1912	2,444	26.40%	3,334	36.01%	3,480	37.59%
1916	9,801	58.64%	6,462	38.66%	451	2.70%
1920	10,382	74.83%	3,101	22.35%	391	2.82%
1924	9,695	64.53%	2,911	19.37%	2,419	16.10%
1928	11,161	65.68%	5,737	33.76%	94	0.55%
1932	8,403	45.20%	10,024	53.92%	162	0.87%
1936	10,801	53.12%	9,190	45.20%	343	1.69%
1940	13,909	64.14%	7,722	35.61%	55	0.25%
1944	12,436	66.44%	6,231	33.29%	52	0.28%
1948	11,184	66.27%	5,618	33.29%	74	0.44%
1952	14,095	71.45%	5,612	28.45%	20	0.10%
1956	13,939	72.82%	5,197	27.15%	7	0.04%
1960	13,139	66.42%	6,642	33.57%	2	0.01%
1964	10,239	54.71%	8,476	45.29%	0	0.00%
1968	11,963	65.88%	5,234	28.82%	963	5.30%
1972	13,217	72.07%	5,110	27.86%	12	0.07%
1976	10,097	64.56%	5,174	33.08%	369	2.36%
1980	11,544	68.62%	4,111	24.44%	1,168	6.94%
1984	12,291	72.65%	4,567	26.99%	61	0.36%
1988	10,324	67.02%	5,009	32.52%	72	0.47%
1992	8,004	46.81%	6,007	35.13%	3,087	18.05%
1996	7,653	51.75%	5,641	38.15%	1,494	10.10%
2000	9,187	59.57%	5,829	37.80%	405	2.63%
2004	10,316	64.32%	5,632	35.11%	91	0.57%
2008	9,191	58.66%	6,189	39.50%	289	1.84%
2012	9,753	64.69%	5,020	33.30%	304	2.02%
2016	10,208	66.54%	4,023	26.22%	1,111	7.24%
2020	12,208	70.92%	4,615	26.81%	391	2.27%
2024	11,970	72.02%	4,311	25.94%	340	2.05%

== Education ==
K-12 school districts include:

- El Paso-Gridley Community Unit School District 11
- Fieldcrest Community Unit School District 6
- Flanagan-Cornell District 74
- Gibson City-Melvin-Sibley Community Unit School District 5
- Herscher Community Unit School District 2
- Paxton-Buckley-Loda Community Unit School District 10
- Prairie Central Community Unit School District 8
- Tri-Point Community Unit School District 6-J
- Woodland Community Unit School District 5

Secondary school districts include:

- Dwight Township High School District 230
- Flanagan-Cornell District 74 (sections in Cornell, Pontiac, and Rooks Creek elementary school districts)
- Pontiac Township High School District 90
- Streator Township High School District 40

Elementary school districts include:

- Allen Township Community Consolidated School District 65
- Cornell Community Consolidated School District 426
- Dwight Common School District 232
- Odell Community Consolidated School District 435
- Pontiac Community Consolidated School District 429
- Rooks Creek Community Consolidated School District 425
- Saunemin Community Consolidated School District 438

== Notable residents ==
- Donald Attig, businessman and adventurer.
- Libbie Beach Brown (1858-1924), philanthropist and temperance activist
- Calistus Bruer, Illinois state representative and farmer
- M. C. Eignus, Illinois state representative
- Moira Harris, actress and wife of Gary Sinise.
- William Harris, first President of the Illinois Senate.
- Irene Hunt, Newbery Medal-winning author.
- Francis Townsend, physician and political activist whose advocacy for an old-age revolving pension influenced the creation of the U.S. Social Security program.
- Skottie Young, comic book artist known for the Oz series. He was born and raised in Fairbury.

== See also ==
- National Register of Historic Places listings in Livingston County, Illinois
