= Calistus Bruer =

American farmer and politician

Calistus Ashhel Bruer (September 8, 1885 – October 1, 1949) was an American farmer and politician.

Bruer was born in Owego Township, Livingston County, Illinois. He went to Pontiac Township High School in Pontiac, Illinois and to Lake Forest University. Bruer was a farmer and stock raiser. He served as town clerk and supervisor for the Owego Township. Bruer was a Republican. He served in the Illinois House of Representatives from 1923 until his death in 1949. Bruer died from a heart attack at his home in Pontiac, Illinois.
