= Germanville Township, Livingston County, Illinois =

Coordinates: 40°38′59″N 88°17′58″W

Germanville Township
- Township
- Location in Livingston County

- Livingston County's location in Illinois
- Country: United States
- State: Illinois
- County: Livingston
- Established: September 1868

Area
  - Total: 22.93 sq mi (59.4 km^{2})
  - Land: 22.92 sq mi (59.4 km^{2})
  - Water: 0.01 sq mi (0.026 km^{2}) 0.06%

Population (2020)
  - Total: 66
  - Density: 2.9/sq mi (1.1/km^{2})
- Time zone: UTC-6 (CST)
  - Summer (DST): UTC-5 (CDT)
- FIPS code: 17-105-29106

Germanville Township is located in Livingston County, Illinois. As of the 2020 census, its population was 66 and it contained 31 housing units.

== History ==
Germanville Township was created from Chatsworth Township in September 1868 as Germantown Township. The name was changed to Germanville Township on July 22, 1879.

== Geography ==
According to the 2021 census gazetteer files, Germanville Township has a total area of 22.93 square miles (59.39 km^{2}), of which 22.92 square miles (59.36 km^{2}) (or 99.94%) is land and 0.01 square miles (0.03 km^{2}) (or 0.06%) is water.

== Demographics ==
As of the 2020 census there were 66 people, 70 households, and 17 families residing in the township. The population density was 2.88 inhabitants per square mile (1.11/km^{2}). There were 31 housing units at an average density of 1.35 per square mile (0.52/km^{2}). The racial makeup of the township was 87.88% White, 1.52% African American, 0.00% Native American, 0.00% Asian, 0.00% Pacific Islander, 4.55% from other races, and 6.06% from two or more races. Hispanic or Latino of any race were 6.06% of the population.

There were 70 households, out of which 17.10% had children under the age of 18 living with them, 24.29% were married couples living together, none had a female householder with no spouse present, and 75.71% were non-families. 75.70% of all households were made up of individuals, and 75.70% had someone living alone who was 65 years of age or older. The average household size was 1.56 and the average family size was 3.29.

The township's age distribution consisted of 21.1% under the age of 18, 0.0% from 18 to 24, 13.8% from 25 to 44, 16.6% from 45 to 64, and 48.6% who were 65 years of age or older. The median age was 62.6 years. For every 100 females, there were 263.3 males. For every 100 females age 18 and over, there were 405.9 males.

The median income for a household in the township was $26,368, and the median income for a family was $97,083. Males had a median income of $52,500 versus $27,083 for females. The per capita income for the township was $23,391. About 35.3% of families and 25.7% of the population were below the poverty line, including 69.6% of those under age 18 and 0.0% of those age 65 or over.

Historical population
Census	Pop.	Note	%±
2010	67		—
2020	66		−1.5%
U.S. Decennial Census
