= Pike Township, Illinois =

Coordinates: 40°47′55″N 88°45′27″W

Pike Township
- Township
- Location in Livingston County

- Livingston County's location in Illinois
- Country: United States
- State: Illinois
- County: Livingston
- Established: November 3, 1857

Area
  - Total: 36.42 sq mi (94.3 km^{2})
  - Land: 36.37 sq mi (94.2 km^{2})
  - Water: 0.05 sq mi (0.13 km^{2}) 0.13%

Population (2020)
  - Total: 208
  - Density: 5.72/sq mi (2.21/km^{2})
- Time zone: UTC-6 (CST)
  - Summer (DST): UTC-5 (CDT)
- FIPS code: 17-105-59780

Pike Township is located in Livingston County, Illinois. As of the 2020 census, its population was 208 and it contained 100 housing units.

== Geography ==
According to the 2021 census gazetteer files, Pike Township has a total area of 36.42 square miles (94.33 km^{2}), of which 36.37 square miles (94.20 km^{2}) (or 99.87%) is land and 0.05 square miles (0.13 km^{2}) (or 0.13%) is water.

== Demographics ==
As of the 2020 census there were 208 people, 197 households, and 189 families residing in the township. The population density was 5.71 inhabitants per square mile (2.20/km^{2}). There were 100 housing units at an average density of 2.75 per square mile (1.06/km^{2}). The racial makeup of the township was 93.27% White, 0.00% African American, 1.44% Native American, 0.48% Asian, 0.00% Pacific Islander, 0.00% from other races, and 4.81% from two or more races. Hispanic or Latino of any race were 5.29% of the population.

There were 197 households, out of which 38.10% had children under the age of 18 living with them, 95.94% were married couples living together, none had a female householder with no spouse present, and 4.06% were non-families. 4.10% of all households were made up of individuals, and none had someone living alone who was 65 years of age or older. The average household size was 2.50 and the average family size was 2.57.

The township's age distribution consisted of 14.6% under the age of 18, 30.2% from 18 to 24, 6.1% from 25 to 44, 40.4% from 45 to 64, and 8.7% who were 65 years of age or older. The median age was 38.8 years. For every 100 females, there were 190.0 males. For every 100 females age 18 and over, there were 152.1 males.

Males had a median income of $23,750 versus $90,101 for females. The per capita income for the township was $34,396. About 6.3% of families and 10.1% of the population were below the poverty line, including 33.3% of those under age 18 and 0.0% of those age 65 or over.

Historical population
Census	Pop.	Note	%±
2010	240		—
2020	208		−13.3%
U.S. Decennial Census
