= Waldo Township, Livingston County, Illinois =

Coordinates: 40°47′26″N 88°52′37″W

Waldo Township, Livingston County
- Township
- Location in Livingston County

- Livingston County's location in Illinois
- Country: United States
- State: Illinois
- County: Livingston
- Established: September 12, 1860

Area
  - Total: 36.45 sq mi (94.4 km^{2})
  - Land: 36.45 sq mi (94.4 km^{2})
  - Water: 0 sq mi (0 km^{2}) 0%

Population (2020)
  - Total: 298
  - Density: 8.18/sq mi (3.16/km^{2})
- Time zone: UTC-6 (CST)
  - Summer (DST): UTC-5 (CDT)
- FIPS code: 17-105-78409

Waldo Township is located in Livingston County, Illinois. As of the 2020 census, its population was 298 and it contained 103 housing units.

== History ==
On September 12, 1860, the area comprising Waldo Township was split from Nebraska Township and established as Kansas Township. Some time later, the name was changed to Waldo Township as there are Kansas-named townships in Edgar and Woodford counties.

== Geography ==
According to the 2021 census gazetteer files, Waldo Township has a total area of 36.45 square miles (94.41 km^{2}), all land.

== Demographics ==
As of the 2020 census there were 298 people, 98 households, and 79 families residing in the township. The population density was 8.18 inhabitants per square mile (3.16/km^{2}). There were 103 housing units at an average density of 2.83 per square mile (1.09/km^{2}). The racial makeup of the township was 96.31% White, 0.34% African American, 0.34% Native American, 0.00% Asian, 0.00% Pacific Islander, 1.01% from other races, and 2.01% from two or more races. Hispanic or Latino of any race were 2.35% of the population.

There were 98 households, out of which 29.60% had children under the age of 18 living with them, 77.55% were married couples living together, 0.00% had a female householder with no spouse present, and 19.39% were non-families. 5.10% of all households were made up of individuals, and 2.00% had someone living alone who was 65 years of age or older. The average household size was 2.54 and the average family size was 2.63.

According to the 2020 American Community Survey, township's age distribution consisted of 21.7% under the age of 18, 8.4% from 18 to 24, 22.8% from 25 to 44, 45.7% from 45 to 64, and 1.2% who were 65 years of age or older. The median age was 39.0 years. For every 100 females, there were 109.9 males. For every 100 females age 18 and over, there were 105.7 males.

The median income for a household in the township was $82,230, and the median income for a family was $81,926. Males had a median income of $59,653 versus $38,235 for females. The per capita income for the township was $38,349. About 0.0% of families and 0.8% of the population were below the poverty line, including 3.7% of those under age 18 and 0.0% of those age 65 or over.

Historical population
Census	Pop.	Note	%±
2000	259		—
2010	255		−1.5%
2020	298		16.9%
U.S. Decennial Census
