= Long Point, Illinois =

- Village
- Location in Livingston County, Illinois
- Coordinates: 41°00′19″N 88°53′35″W
- Country: United States
- State: Illinois
- County: Livingston
- Township: Long Point

Area
  - Total: 0.19 sq mi (0.48 km^{2})
  - Land: 0.19 sq mi (0.48 km^{2})
  - Water: 0 sq mi (0.00 km^{2})
- Elevation: 637 ft (194 m)

Population (2020)
  - Total: 204
  - Density: 1,102.0/sq mi (425.49/km^{2})
- Time zone: UTC-6 (CST)
  - Summer (DST): UTC-5 (CDT)
- ZIP code: 61333
- Area codes: 815 and 779
- FIPS code: 17-44576
- GNIS feature ID: 2398472

Long Point is a village in Livingston County, Illinois, United States. As of the 2020 census, Long Point had a population of 204.

== Geography ==
Long Point is located in northwestern Livingston County 21 miles (34 km) by road northwest of Pontiac, the county seat, and 11 miles (18 km) south-southwest of Streator.

According to the 2021 census gazetteer files, Long Point has a total area of 0.19 square miles (0.49 km^{2}), all land.

== Demographics ==
Historical population
Census	Pop.	Note	%±
1900	284		—
1910	239		−15.8%
1920	247		3.3%
1930	254		2.8%
1940	278		9.4%
1950	286		2.9%
1960	307		7.3%
1970	310		1.0%
1980	313		1.0%
1990	208		−33.5%
2000	247		18.8%
2010	226		−8.5%
2020	204		−9.7%
U.S. Decennial Census

As of the 2020 census there were 204 people, 81 households, and 64 families residing in the village. The population density was 1,102.70 inhabitants per square mile (425.75/km^{2}). There were 86 housing units at an average density of 464.86 per square mile (179.48/km^{2}). The racial makeup of the village was 95.59% White, 0.00% African American, 0.00% Native American, 0.00% Asian, 0.00% Pacific Islander, 0.00% from other races, and 4.41% from two or more races. Hispanic or Latino of any race were 1.96% of the population.

There were 81 households, out of which 42.0% had children under the age of 18 living with them, 51.85% were married couples living together, 17.28% had a female householder with no husband present, and 20.99% were non-families. 13.58% of all households were made up of individuals, and 3.70% had someone living alone who was 65 years of age or older. The average household size was 3.14 and the average family size was 3.09.

The village's age distribution consisted of 32.0% under the age of 18, 7.2% from 18 to 24, 25.2% from 25 to 44, 24.8% from 45 to 64, and 10.8% who were 65 years of age or older. The median age was 35.8 years. For every 100 females, there were 127.3 males. For every 100 females age 18 and over, there were 88.9 males.

The median income for a household in the village was $61,875, and the median income for a family was $64,500. Males had a median income of $52,604 versus $30,625 for females. The per capita income for the village was $21,644. About 12.5% of families and 16.9% of the population were below the poverty line, including 16.4% of those under age 18 and 0.0% of those age 65 or over.
