= Emington, Illinois =

- Village
- Location in Livingston County, Illinois
- Coordinates: 40°58′10″N 88°21′28″W
- Country: United States
- State: Illinois
- County: Livingston
- Townships: Union, Broughton

Area
  - Total: 0.081 sq mi (0.21 km^{2})
  - Land: 0.081 sq mi (0.21 km^{2})
  - Water: 0 sq mi (0.00 km^{2})
- Elevation: 709 ft (216 m)

Population (2020)
  - Total: 101
  - Density: 1,221.1/sq mi (471.48/km^{2})
- Time zone: UTC-6 (CST)
  - Summer (DST): UTC-5 (CDT)
- ZIP code: 60934
- Area code: 815
- FIPS code: 17-24062
- GNIS ID: 2398828

Emington is a village in Livingston County, Illinois, United States. As of the 2020 census, Emington had a population of 101.

== Geography ==
Emington is located in northeastern Livingston County 18 miles (29 km) northeast of the county seat of Pontiac and 12 miles (19 km) southeast of Dwight. It is 35 miles (56 km) west of Kankakee and 46 miles (74 km) south of Joliet.

According to the 2021 census gazetteer files, Emington has a total area of 0.08 square miles (0.21 km^{2}), all land.

== Demographics ==
Historical population
Census	Pop.	Note	%±
1890	129		—
1900	206		59.7%
1910	190		−7.8%
1920	175		−7.9%
1930	151		−13.7%
1940	160		6.0%
1950	150		−6.2%
1960	133		−11.3%
1970	101		−24.1%
1980	119		17.8%
1990	135		13.4%
2000	120		−11.1%
2010	117		−2.5%
2020	101		−13.7%
U.S. Decennial Census

As of the 2020 census there were 101 people, 40 households, and 26 families residing in the village. The population density was 1,216.87 inhabitants per square mile (469.84/km^{2}). There were 49 housing units at an average density of 590.36 per square mile (227.94/km^{2}). The racial makeup of the village was 97.03% White, 0.00% African American, 0.00% Native American, 0.00% Asian, 0.00% Pacific Islander, 0.00% from other races, and 2.97% from two or more races. Hispanic or Latino of any race were 3.96% of the population.

There were 40 households, out of which 40.0% had children under the age of 18 living with them, 32.50% were married couples living together, 22.50% had a female householder with no husband present, and 35.00% were non-families. 30.00% of all households were made up of individuals, and 15.00% had someone living alone who was 65 years of age or older. The average household size was 2.62 and the average family size was 2.23.

The village's age distribution consisted of 24.7% under the age of 18, 5.6% from 18 to 24, 38.3% from 25 to 44, 22.4% from 45 to 64, and 9.0% who were 65 years of age or older. The median age was 35.3 years. For every 100 females, there were 102.3 males. For every 100 females age 18 and over, there were 86.1 males.

The median income for a household in the village was $51,563, and the median income for a family was $51,500. Males had a median income of $39,063 versus $26,250 for females. The per capita income for the village was $27,643. About 0.0% of families and 3.4% of the population were below the poverty line, including 0.0% of those under age 18 and 12.5% of those age 65 or over.
