= Union Township, Livingston County, Illinois =

Coordinates: 40°58′44″N 88°25′10″W

Union Township
- Township
- Location in Livingston County

- Livingston County's location in Illinois
- Country: United States
- State: Illinois
- County: Livingston
- Established: 1864

Area
  - Total: 35.26 sq mi (91.3 km^{2})
  - Land: 35.23 sq mi (91.2 km^{2})
  - Water: 0.03 sq mi (0.078 km^{2}) 0.08%

Population (2020)
  - Total: 195
  - Density: 5.54/sq mi (2.14/km^{2})
- Time zone: UTC-6 (CST)
  - Summer (DST): UTC-5 (CDT)
- FIPS code: 17-105-76680

Union Township is located in Livingston County, Illinois. As of the 2020 census, its population was 195 and it contained 91 housing units. Union Township formed from Odell Township in 1864.

== Geography ==
According to the 2021 census gazetteer files, Union Township has a total area of 35.26 square miles (91.32 km^{2}), of which 35.23 square miles (91.25 km^{2}) (or 99.92%) is land and 0.03 square miles (0.08 km^{2}) (or 0.08%) is water.

== Demographics ==
As of the 2020 census there were 195 people, 52 households, and 38 families residing in the township. The population density was 5.53 inhabitants per square mile (2.14/km^{2}). There were 91 housing units at an average density of 2.58 per square mile (1.00/km^{2}). The racial makeup of the township was 93.85% White, 0.51% African American, 0.00% Native American, 1.03% Asian, 0.00% Pacific Islander, 0.00% from other races, and 4.62% from two or more races. Hispanic or Latino of any race were 3.08% of the population.

There were 52 households, out of which 23.10% had children under the age of 18 living with them, 67.31% were married couples living together, 0.00% had a female householder with no spouse present, and 26.92% were non-families. 21.20% of all households were made up of individuals, and 13.50% had someone living alone who was 65 years of age or older. The average household size was 2.87 and the average family size was 3.34.

According to the 2020 American Community Survey, township's age distribution consisted of 12.8% under the age of 18, 16.1% from 18 to 24, 25.5% from 25 to 44, 24.1% from 45 to 64, and 21.5% who were 65 years of age or older. The median age was 43.0 years. For every 100 females, there were 114.3 males. For every 100 females age 18 and over, there were 104.2 males.

The median income for a household in the township was $89,167, and the median income for a family was $112,500. Males had a median income of $50,625 versus $16,786 for females. The per capita income for the township was $57,309. About 7.9% of families and 20.1% of the population were below the poverty line, including 52.6% of those under age 18 and 0.0% of those age 65 or over.

Historical population
Census	Pop.	Note	%±
2000	253		—
2010	240		−5.1%
2020	195		−18.7%
U.S. Decennial Census
