= Long Point Township, Livingston County, Illinois =

Coordinates: 40°58′21″N 88°52′20″W

Long Point Township
- Township
- Location in Livingston County

- Livingston County's location in Illinois
- Country: United States
- State: Illinois
- County: Livingston
- Established: November 3, 1857

Area
  - Total: 36.50 sq mi (94.5 km^{2})
  - Land: 36.50 sq mi (94.5 km^{2})
  - Water: 0 sq mi (0 km^{2}) 0%

Population (2020)
  - Total: 464
  - Density: 12.7/sq mi (4.91/km^{2})
- Time zone: UTC-6 (CST)
  - Summer (DST): UTC-5 (CDT)
- FIPS code: 17-105-44589

Long Point Township is located in Livingston County, Illinois. As of the 2020 census, its population was 464 and it contained 197 housing units.

== Geography ==
According to the 2021 census gazetteer files, Long Point Township has a total area of 36.50 square miles (94.53 km^{2}), all land.

== Demographics ==
As of the 2020 census there were 464 people, 140 households, and 100 families residing in the township. The population density was 12.71 inhabitants per square mile (4.91/km^{2}). There were 197 housing units at an average density of 5.40 per square mile (2.08/km^{2}). The racial makeup of the township was 96.55% White, 0.00% African American, 0.00% Native American, 0.00% Asian, 0.00% Pacific Islander, 0.43% from other races, and 3.02% from two or more races. Hispanic or Latino of any race were 1.51% of the population.

There were 140 households, out of which 32.90% had children under the age of 18 living with them, 53.57% were married couples living together, 10.71% had a female householder with no spouse present, and 28.57% were non-families. 22.10% of all households were made up of individuals, and 7.90% had someone living alone who was 65 years of age or older. The average household size was 2.54 and the average family size was 2.82.

The township's age distribution consisted of 25.6% under the age of 18, 6.5% from 18 to 24, 23.8% from 25 to 44, 24.2% from 45 to 64, and 19.9% who were 65 years of age or older. The median age was 38.8 years. For every 100 females, there were 107.0 males. For every 100 females age 18 and over, there were 84.0 males.

The median income for a household in the township was $64,318, and the median income for a family was $85,000. Males had a median income of $53,000 versus $41,667 for females. The per capita income for the township was $26,772. About 8.0% of families and 15.7% of the population were below the poverty line, including 13.9% of those under age 18 and 0.0% of those age 65 or over.

Historical population
| Census | Pop. | Note | %± |
|---|---|---|---|
| 2010 | 498 | | — |
| 2020 | 464 | | −6.8% |
U.S. Decennial Census
