= Lake-Side Terrace Apartments =

Apartment building in Chicago, Illinois

- U.S. National Register of Historic Places
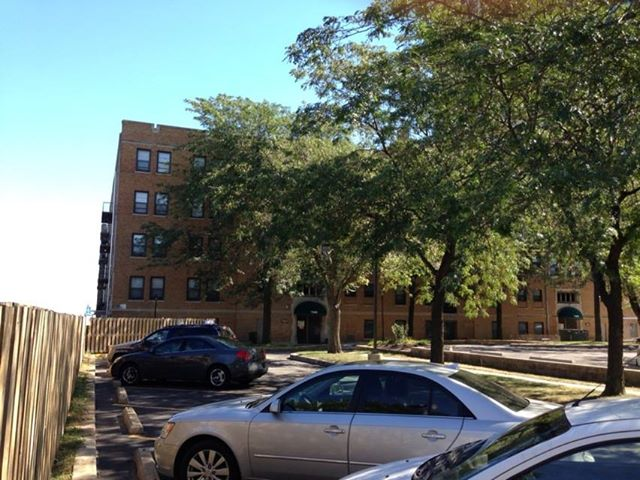

- Location within Chicago metropolitan area Location within Illinois Location within the United States
- Location: 7425-7427 South Shore Dr., Chicago, Illinois
- Coordinates: 41°45′44″N 87°33′25″W
- Area: less than one acre
- Built: 1922-23
- Architect: Hall, Eric Edwin
- Architectural style: Tudor Revival
- NRHP reference No.: 84000289
- Added to NRHP: November 13, 1984

The Lake-Side Terrace Apartments is a historic apartment building at 7425-7427 South Shore Drive in the South Shore neighborhood of Chicago, Illinois. Built in 1922–23, the building is an example of a courtyard apartment, a popular apartment style in early 20th century Chicago. As the building adjoins Lake Michigan, its courtyard opens toward the lake; the courtyard is also elevated to enhance its lake view. Chicago architect Eric Edwin Hall designed the Tudor Revival building. The four-story brick building features limestone entrance and window surrounds, Tudor arched entrances to the courtyard, and a battlement along the roof.

The building was added to the National Register of Historic Places on November 13, 1984.
