= Jeffery–Cyril Historic District =

Apartment building in Chicago, Illinois

- U.S. National Register of Historic Places
- U.S. Historic district
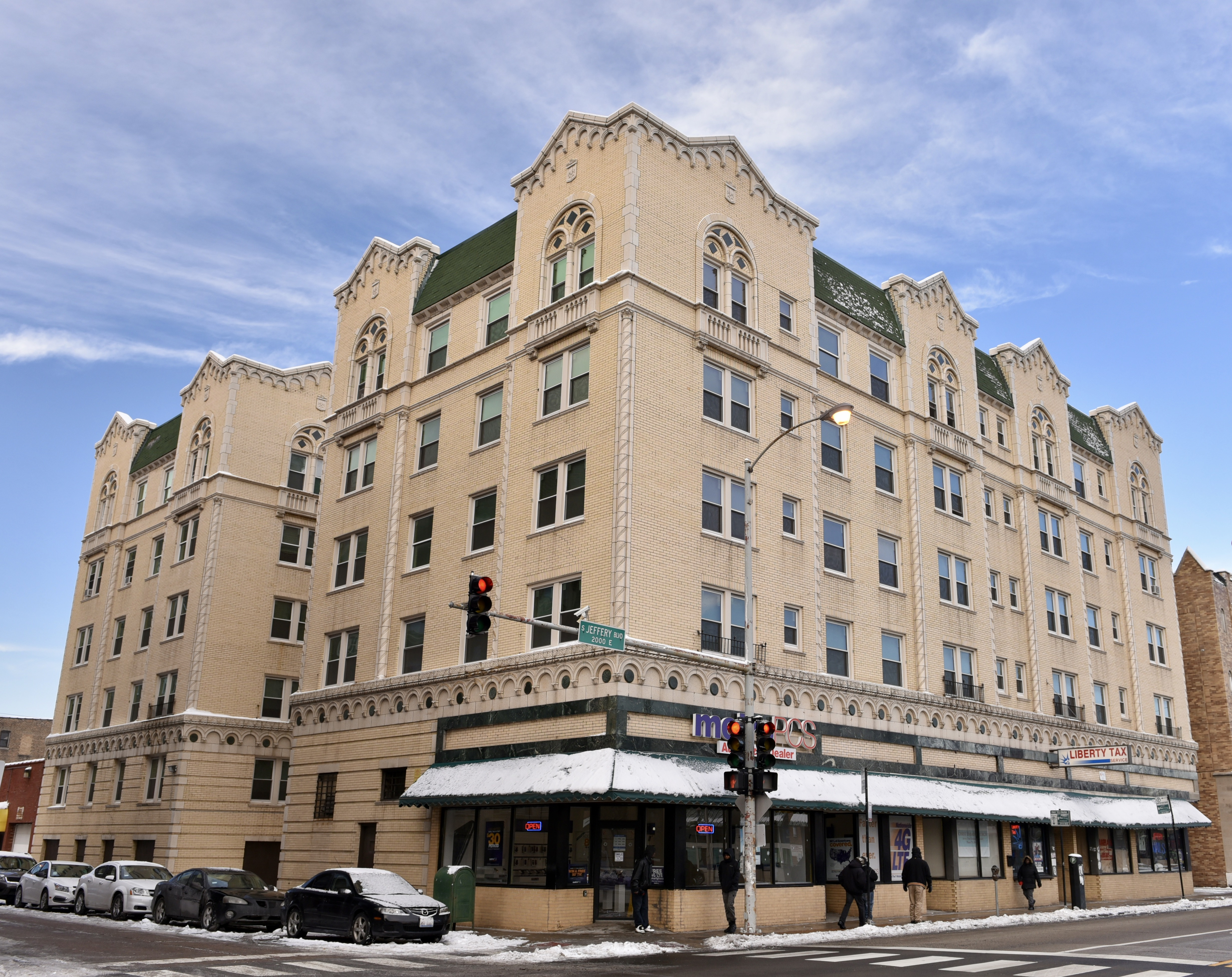
- Building at 1966 E. 71st Place

- Location within Chicago metropolitan area Location within Illinois Location within the United States
- Location: 7146--7148, 7128--7138 Cyril Ave., 7144--7148, 7147 and 7130 S. Jeffery Blvd., and 1966--1974 E. 71st Pl., Chicago, Illinois
- Coordinates: 41°45′53″N 87°34′36″W
- Area: 3 acres (1.2 ha)
- NRHP reference No.: 86001007
- Added to NRHP: May 5, 1986

The Jeffery–Cyril Historic District is a national historic district in the South Shore neighborhood of Chicago, Illinois. The district comprises a cluster of six apartment buildings on Jeffery Boulevard, 71st Place, and Cyril Avenue. All six buildings were built between 1927 and 1929. Apartments had become a popular housing choice for middle-class families by the 1920s, when South Shore was developed; due to zoning restrictions, however, the district is the only large group of apartments in the neighborhood. The apartments reflect the diversity of late 1920s architecture; in fact, while architect Paul F. Olsen designed three of the buildings, he used a different style for each of them. Five of the buildings use revival styles, which were popular at the time, with examples of Georgian Revival, Gothic Revival, Spanish Colonial Revival, and Tudor Revival designs; the remaining building features the then-emerging Art Deco style.

The district was added to the National Register of Historic Places on May 5, 1986.
