= Belle Prairie Township, Livingston County, Illinois =

Coordinates: 40°38′51″N 88°31′23″W

Belle Prairie Township
- Township
- Location in Livingston County

- Livingston County's location in Illinois
- Country: United States
- State: Illinois
- County: Livingston
- Established: November 3, 1857

Area
  - Total: 22.85 sq mi (59.2 km^{2})
  - Land: 22.87 sq mi (59.2 km^{2})
  - Water: 0 sq mi (0 km^{2}) 0%

Population (2020)
  - Total: 147
  - Density: 6.43/sq mi (2.48/km^{2})
- Time zone: UTC-6 (CST)
  - Summer (DST): UTC-5 (CDT)
- FIPS code: 17-105-04780

Belle Prairie Township is located in Livingston County, Illinois in the United States. As of the 2020 census, its population was 142 and it contained 51 housing units.

== Geography ==
According to the 2021 census gazetteer files, Belle Prairie Township has a total area of 22.87 square miles (59.23 km^{2}), all land.

== Demographics ==
As of the 2020 census there were 142 people, 62 households, and 33 families residing in the township. The population density was 6.21 inhabitants per square mile (2.40/km^{2}). There were 51 housing units at an average density of 2.23 per square mile (0.86/km^{2}). The racial makeup of the township was 98.59% White, 0.00% African American, 0.00% Native American, 0.00% Asian, 0.00% Pacific Islander, 0.00% from other races, and 1.41% from two or more races. Hispanic or Latino of any race were 1.41% of the population.

There were 62 households, out of which 6.50% had children under the age of 18 living with them, 53.23% were married couples living together, 0.00% had a female householder with no spouse present, and 46.77% were non-families. 46.80% of all households were made up of individuals, and 19.40% had someone living alone who was 65 years of age or older. The average household size was 2.05 and the average family size was 2.97.

The township's age distribution consisted of 9.4% under the age of 18, 0.0% from 18 to 24, 7% from 25 to 44, 40.2% from 45 to 64, and 43.3% who were 65 years of age or older. The median age was 62.7 years. For every 100 females, there were 76.4 males. For every 100 females age 18 and over, there were 91.7 males.

The median income for a household in the township was $66,731, and the median income for a family was $146,250. Males had a median income of $65,481 versus $60,500 for females. The per capita income for the township was $56,278. None of the population was below the poverty line.

Historical population
Census	Pop.	Note	%±
2010	135		—
2020	142		5.2%
U.S. Decennial Census
