= Nebraska Township, Livingston County, Illinois =

Coordinates: 40°53′06″N 88°52′36″W

Nebraska Township
- Township
- Location in Livingston County

- Livingston County's location in Illinois
- Country: United States
- State: Illinois
- County: Livingston
- Established: November 3, 1857

Area
  - Total: 36.50 sq mi (94.5 km^{2})
  - Land: 36.50 sq mi (94.5 km^{2})
  - Water: 0 sq mi (0 km^{2}) 0%

Population (2020)
  - Total: 1,298
  - Density: 35.56/sq mi (13.73/km^{2})
- Time zone: UTC-6 (CST)
  - Summer (DST): UTC-5 (CDT)
- FIPS code: 17-105-51895

Nebraska Township is located in Livingston County, Illinois. As of the 2020 census, its population was 1,298 and it contained 613 housing units.

== Geography ==
According to the 2021 census gazetteer files, Nebraska Township has a total area of 36.50 square miles (94.53 km^{2}), all land.

== Demographics ==
As of the 2020 census there were 1,298 people, 521 households, and 338 families residing in the township. The population density was 35.57 inhabitants per square mile (13.73/km^{2}). There were 613 housing units at an average density of 16.80 per square mile (6.49/km^{2}). The racial makeup of the township was 93.37% White, 1.00% African American, 0.15% Native American, 1.16% Asian, 0.00% Pacific Islander, 0.69% from other races, and 3.62% from two or more races. Hispanic or Latino of any race were 2.31% of the population.

There were 521 households, out of which 21.70% had children under the age of 18 living with them, 54.70% were married couples living together, 5.95% had a female householder with no spouse present, and 35.12% were non-families. 33.20% of all households were made up of individuals, and 20.20% had someone living alone who was 65 years of age or older. The average household size was 2.21 and the average family size was 2.76.

The township's age distribution consisted of 17.1% under the age of 18, 8.2% from 18 to 24, 16.5% from 25 to 44, 27.8% from 45 to 64, and 30.4% who were 65 years of age or older. The median age was 52.1 years. For every 100 females, there were 94.4 males. For every 100 females age 18 and over, there were 97.2 males.

The median income for a household in the township was $66,027, and the median income for a family was $89,500. Males had a median income of $51,761 versus $29,250 for females. The per capita income for the township was $39,170. About 1.2% of families and 6.1% of the population were below the poverty line, including 0.9% of those under age 18 and 10.9% of those age 65 or over.

Historical population
Census	Pop.	Note	%±
2010	1,433		—
2020	1,298		−9.4%
U.S. Decennial Census
