= Indian Grove Township, Livingston County, Illinois =

Coordinates: 40°43′02″N 88°31′45″W

Indian Grove Township
- Township
- Location in Livingston County

- Livingston County's location in Illinois
- Country: United States
- State: Illinois
- County: Livingston
- Established: November 3, 1857

Area
  - Total: 36.32 sq mi (94.1 km^{2})
  - Land: 36.02 sq mi (93.3 km^{2})
  - Water: 0.31 sq mi (0.80 km^{2}) 0.85%

Population (2020)
  - Total: 4,148
  - Density: 115.2/sq mi (44.46/km^{2})
- Time zone: UTC-6 (CST)
  - Summer (DST): UTC-5 (CDT)
- FIPS code: 17-105-37244

Indian Grove Township is located in Livingston County, Illinois. As of the 2020 census, its population was 4,148 and it contained 1,844 housing units. Indian Grove Township changed its name from Worth Township on May 11, 1858.

== Geography ==
According to the 2021 census gazetteer files, Indian Grove Township has a total area of 36.32 square miles (94.07 km^{2}), of which 36.02 square miles (93.29 km^{2}) (or 99.15%) is land and 0.31 square miles (0.80 km^{2}) (or 0.85%) is water.

== Demographics ==
As of the 2020 census there were 4,148 people, 1,711 households, and 1,158 families residing in the township. The population density was 114.20 inhabitants per square mile (44.09/km^{2}). There were 1,844 housing units at an average density of 50.77 per square mile (19.60/km^{2}). The racial makeup of the township was 94.02% White, 0.68% African American, 0.19% Native American, 0.43% Asian, 0.00% Pacific Islander, 1.42% from other races, and 3.25% from two or more races. Hispanic or Latino of any race were 3.50% of the population.

There were 1,711 households, out of which 36.80% had children under the age of 18 living with them, 55.11% were married couples living together, 11.16% had a female householder with no spouse present, and 32.32% were non-families. 28.60% of all households were made up of individuals, and 17.20% had someone living alone who was 65 years of age or older. The average household size was 2.35 and the average family size was 2.81.

The township's age distribution consisted of 24.5% under the age of 18, 11.2% from 18 to 24, 18.9% from 25 to 44, 21.9% from 45 to 64, and 23.6% who were 65 years of age or older. The median age was 40.3 years. For every 100 females, there were 89.0 males. For every 100 females age 18 and over, there were 85.7 males.

The median income for a household in the township was $58,947, and the median income for a family was $77,500. Males had a median income of $50,763 versus $25,704 for females. The per capita income for the township was $29,509. About 8.3% of families and 10.8% of the population were below the poverty line, including 20.1% of those under age 18 and 6.4% of those age 65 or over.

Historical population
Census	Pop.	Note	%±
2010	4,297		—
2020	4,148		−3.5%
U.S. Decennial Census
