= Round Grove Township, Livingston County, Illinois =

Coordinates: 41°04′06″N 88°18′36″W

Round Grove Township
- Township
- Location in Livingston County

- Livingston County's location in Illinois
- Country: United States
- State: Illinois
- County: Livingston
- Established: November 3, 1857

Area
  - Total: 36.24 sq mi (93.9 km^{2})
  - Land: 36.24 sq mi (93.9 km^{2})
  - Water: 0 sq mi (0 km^{2}) 0%

Population (2020)
  - Total: 341
  - Density: 9.41/sq mi (3.63/km^{2})
- Time zone: UTC-6 (CST)
  - Summer (DST): UTC-5 (CDT)
- FIPS code: 17-105-65988

Round Grove Township is located in Livingston County, Illinois. As of the 2020 census, its population was 341 and it contained 159 housing units.

== Geography ==
According to the 2021 census gazetteer files, Round Grove Township has a total area of 36.24 square miles (93.86 km^{2}), all land.

== Demographics ==
As of the 2020 census there were 341 people, 142 households, and 127 families residing in the township. The population density was 9.41 inhabitants per square mile (3.63/km^{2}). There were 159 housing units at an average density of 4.39 per square mile (1.69/km^{2}). The racial makeup of the township was 92.38% White, 0.59% African American, 0.00% Native American, 0.88% Asian, 0.00% Pacific Islander, 1.76% from other races, and 4.40% from two or more races. Hispanic or Latino of any race were 1.76% of the population.

There were 142 households, out of which 29.60% had children under the age of 18 living with them, 86.62% were married couples living together, 2.82% had a female householder with no spouse present, and 10.56% were non-families. 7.70% of all households were made up of individuals, and 2.10% had someone living alone who was 65 years of age or older. The average household size was 2.87 and the average family size was 3.06.

According to the 2020 American Community Survey, township's age distribution consisted of 32.4% under the age of 18, 0.2% from 18 to 24, 26% from 25 to 44, 11% from 45 to 64, and 30.4% who were 65 years of age or older. The median age was 35.4 years. For every 100 females, there were 120 males. For every 100 females age 18 and over, there were 122.8 males.

The median income for a household in the township was $78,125, and the median income for a family was $81,875. Males had a median income of $83,843 versus $43,889 for females. The per capita income for the township was $27,715. About 2.4% of families and 2.9% of the population were below the poverty line, including 2.3% of those under age 18 and 0.8% of those age 65 or over.

Historical population
Census	Pop.	Note	%±
2000	411		—
2010	371		−9.7%
2020	341		−8.1%
U.S. Decennial Census
