= Pontiac Township, Livingston County, Illinois =

Coordinates: 40°53′16″N 88°38′35″W

Pontiac Township
- Township
- Location in Livingston County

- Livingston County's location in Illinois
- Country: United States
- State: Illinois
- County: Livingston
- Established: November 3, 1857

Area
  - Total: 36.34 sq mi (94.1 km^{2})
  - Land: 35.70 sq mi (92.5 km^{2})
  - Water: 0.64 sq mi (1.7 km^{2}) 1.76%

Population (2020)
  - Total: 12,290
  - Density: 344.3/sq mi (132.9/km^{2})
- Time zone: UTC-6 (CST)
  - Summer (DST): UTC-5 (CDT)
- ZIP code: 61764
- Area codes: 815 and 779
- FIPS code: 17-105-61028

Pontiac Township is located in Livingston County, Illinois. As of the 2020 census, its population was 12,290 and it contained 5,333 housing units.

== Geography ==
According to the 2021 census gazetteer files, Pontiac Township has a total area of 36.34 square miles (94.12 km^{2}), of which 35.70 square miles (92.46 km^{2}) (or 98.24%) is land and 0.64 square miles (1.66 km^{2}) (or 1.76%) is water.

== Demographics ==
As of the 2020 census there were 12,290 people, 4,690 households, and 2,845 families residing in the township. The population density was 338.18 inhabitants per square mile (130.57/km^{2}). There were 5,333 housing units at an average density of 146.74 per square mile (56.66/km^{2}). The racial makeup of the township was 82.82% White, 7.87% African American, 0.32% Native American, 0.63% Asian, 0.00% Pacific Islander, 3.53% from other races, and 4.84% from two or more races. Hispanic or Latino of any race were 7.46% of the population.

There were 4,690 households, out of which 31.50% had children under the age of 18 living with them, 40.58% were married couples living together, 13.01% had a female householder with no spouse present, and 39.34% were non-families. 34.90% of all households were made up of individuals, and 15.70% had someone living alone who was 65 years of age or older. The average household size was 2.25 and the average family size was 2.88.

The township's age distribution consisted of 20.8% under the age of 18, 5.8% from 18 to 24, 30.1% from 25 to 44, 24.7% from 45 to 64, and 18.5% who were 65 years of age or older. The median age was 39.7 years. For every 100 females, there were 117.3 males. For every 100 females age 18 and over, there were 117.1 males.

The median income for a household in the township was $50,629, and the median income for a family was $64,517. Males had a median income of $40,870 versus $26,641 for females. The per capita income for the township was $26,468. About 11.7% of families and 15.9% of the population were below the poverty line, including 21.8% of those under age 18 and 11.5% of those age 65 or over.

Historical population
Census	Pop.	Note	%±
2010	13,049		—
2020	12,290		−5.8%
U.S. Decennial Census
