= Owego Township, Livingston County, Illinois =

Coordinates: 40°53′26″N 88°31′59″W

Owego Township
- Township
- Location in Livingston County

- Livingston County's location in Illinois
- Country: United States
- State: Illinois
- County: Livingston
- Established: November 3, 1857

Area
  - Total: 36.14 sq mi (93.6 km^{2})
  - Land: 36.12 sq mi (93.6 km^{2})
  - Water: 0.02 sq mi (0.052 km^{2}) 0.06%

Population (2020)
  - Total: 320
  - Density: 8.9/sq mi (3.4/km^{2})
- Time zone: UTC-6 (CST)
  - Summer (DST): UTC-5 (CDT)
- FIPS code: 17-105-57056

Owego Township is located in Livingston County, Illinois. As of the 2010 census, its population was 328 and it contained 123 housing units.

== History ==
The first person to settle in the township was Daniel Rockwood, who arrived in 1833. An early member of the Livingston County commissioners, Rockwood was elected the first town supervisor when Owego Township was organized in 1857. The town is named after Owego, New York, the major settlement in Rockwood's native home of Tioga County.

== Geography ==
According to the 2021 census gazetteer files, Owego Township has a total area of 36.14 square miles (93.60 km^{2}), of which 36.12 square miles (93.55 km^{2}) (or 99.94%) is land and 0.02 square miles (0.05 km^{2}) (or 0.06%) is water.

== Demographics ==
As of the 2020 census there were 320 people, 119 households, and 108 families residing in the township. The population density was 8.85 inhabitants per square mile (3.42/km^{2}). There were 121 housing units at an average density of 3.35 per square mile (1.29/km^{2}). The racial makeup of the township was 91.88% White, 0.63% African American, 0.63% Native American, 0.00% Asian, 0.00% Pacific Islander, 0.31% from other races, and 6.56% from two or more races. Hispanic or Latino of any race were 4.06% of the population.

There were 119 households, out of which 8.40% had children under the age of 18 living with them, 88.24% were married couples living together, 0.00% had a female householder with no spouse present, and 9.24% were non-families. 9.20% of all households were made up of individuals, and 0.00% had someone living alone who was 65 years of age or older. The average household size was 2.31 and the average family size was 2.41.

The township's age distribution consisted of 4.0% under the age of 18, 9.1% from 18 to 24, 5.9% from 25 to 44, 71.6% from 45 to 64, and 9.5% who were 65 years of age or older. The median age was 56.4 years. For every 100 females, there were 71.9 males. For every 100 females age 18 and over, there were 72.5 males.

The median income for a household in the township was $100,694, and the median income for a family was $99,000. Males had a median income of $55,781 versus $50,000 for females. The per capita income for the township was $54,306. None of the population was below the poverty line.

Historical population
Census	Pop.	Note	%±
2010	328		—
2020	320		−2.4%
U.S. Decennial Census
