= Chatsworth Township, Livingston County, Illinois =

Coordinates: 40°43′29″N 88°17′33″W

Chatsworth Township
- Township
- Location in Livingston County

- Livingston County's location in Illinois
- Country: United States
- State: Illinois
- County: Livingston
- Established: November 3, 1857

Area
  - Total: 36.03 sq mi (93.3 km^{2})
  - Land: 35.95 sq mi (93.1 km^{2})
  - Water: 0.08 sq mi (0.21 km^{2}) 0.22%

Population (2020)
  - Total: 1,344
  - Density: 37.39/sq mi (14.43/km^{2})
- Time zone: UTC-6 (CST)
  - Summer (DST): UTC-5 (CDT)
- FIPS code: 17-105-12723

Chatsworth Township is located in Livingston County, Illinois. As of the 2020 census, its population was 1,344 and it contained 623 housing units.

== History ==
Chatsworth Township changed its name from Olivers Grove Township on October 11, 1859.

Chatsworth Township was named after the Chatsworth House, the country home of the Duke of Devonshire, England.

== Geography ==
According to the 2021 census gazetteer files, Chatsworth Township has a total area of 36.03 square miles (93.32 km^{2}), of which 35.95 square miles (93.11 km^{2}) (or 99.78%) is land and 0.08 square miles (0.21 km^{2}) (or 0.22%) is water.

== Demographics ==
As of the 2020 census there were 1,344 people, 669 households, and 385 families residing in the township. The population density was 37.30 inhabitants per square mile (14.40/km^{2}). There were 623 housing units at an average density of 17.29 per square mile (6.68/km^{2}). The racial makeup of the township was 91.00% White, 0.74% African American, 0.00% Native American, 0.67% Asian, 0.00% Pacific Islander, 2.01% from other races, and 5.58% from two or more races. Hispanic or Latino of any race were 7.22% of the population.

There were 669 households, out of which 26.50% had children under the age of 18 living with them, 36.92% were married couples living together, 10.61% had a female householder with no spouse present, and 42.45% were non-families. 33.80% of all households were made up of individuals, and 6.90% had someone living alone who was 65 years of age or older. The average household size was 2.27 and the average family size was 2.86.

The township's age distribution consisted of 21.1% under the age of 18, 10.7% from 18 to 24, 20% from 25 to 44, 33.1% from 45 to 64, and 15.1% who were 65 years of age or older. The median age was 44.4 years. For every 100 females, there were 119.7 males. For every 100 females age 18 and over, there were 111.6 males.

The median income for a household in the township was $53,036, and the median income for a family was $49,598. Males had a median income of $45,000 versus $21,577 for females. The per capita income for the township was $26,173. About 14.0% of families and 19.4% of the population were below the poverty line, including 27.6% of those under age 18 and 7.4% of those age 65 or over.

Historical population
Census	Pop.	Note	%±
2010	1,366		—
2020	1,344		−1.6%
U.S. Decennial Census
