= Odell Township, Livingston County, Illinois =

Coordinates: 40°59′03″N 88°31′33″W

Odell Township
- Township
- Location in Livingston County

- Livingston County's location in Illinois
- Country: United States
- State: Illinois
- County: Livingston
- Established: November 3, 1857

Area
  - Total: 36.06 sq mi (93.4 km^{2})
  - Land: 36.02 sq mi (93.3 km^{2})
  - Water: 0.04 sq mi (0.10 km^{2}) 0.10%

Population (2020)
  - Total: 1,225
  - Density: 34.01/sq mi (13.13/km^{2})
- Time zone: UTC-6 (CST)
  - Summer (DST): UTC-5 (CDT)
- FIPS code: 17-105-55184

Odell Township is located in Livingston County, Illinois. As of the 2020 census, its population was 1,225 and it contained 532 housing units.

== Geography ==
According to the 2021 census gazetteer files, Odell Township has a total area of 36.06 square miles (93.39 km^{2}), of which 36.02 square miles (93.29 km^{2}) (or 99.90%) is land and 0.04 square miles (0.10 km^{2}) (or 0.10%) is water.

== Demographics ==
As of the 2020 census there were 1,225 people, 392 households, and 256 families residing in the township. The population density was 33.97 inhabitants per square mile (13.12/km^{2}). There were 532 housing units at an average density of 14.75 per square mile (5.70/km^{2}). The racial makeup of the township was 93.96% White, 0.57% African American, 0.00% Native American, 0.00% Asian, 0.00% Pacific Islander, 0.90% from other races, and 4.57% from two or more races. Hispanic or Latino of any race were 3.10% of the population.

There were 392 households, out of which 44.90% had children under the age of 18 living with them, 46.43% were married couples living together, 10.46% had a female householder with no spouse present, and 34.69% were non-families. 28.30% of all households were made up of individuals, and 16.30% had someone living alone who was 65 years of age or older. The average household size was 2.52 and the average family size was 3.01.

The township's age distribution consisted of 27.6% under the age of 18, 7.7% from 18 to 24, 20.2% from 25 to 44, 25.4% from 45 to 64, and 19.1% who were 65 years of age or older. The median age was 41.1 years. For every 100 females, there were 88.5 males. For every 100 females age 18 and over, there were 84.5 males.

The median income for a household in the township was $45,833, and the median income for a family was $69,167. Males had a median income of $44,167 versus $24,821 for females. The per capita income for the township was $32,991. About 11.7% of families and 16.1% of the population were below the poverty line, including 18.7% of those under age 18 and 14.4% of those age 65 or over.

Historical population
Census	Pop.	Note	%±
2010	1,276		—
2020	1,225		−4.0%
U.S. Decennial Census
