= List of rail accidents (1880–1889) =

This is a list of rail accidents from 1880 to 1889.

== 1880 ==
- January 8 – United Kingdom – A collision near Southport killed ten people.
- January 15 – United Kingdom – Six people were killed when the 5:30 express from Liverpool collided with a passenger train between Ormskirk and Burscough Junction. Both trains were on the same line and a signalman was arrested.
- February – United Kingdom – Thirty passengers had minor injuries following a collision between a Welsh coal-train and an express from Chester, near the Birkenhead Tunnel.
- February 10 – France – A train from St Lazare station ran into the Paris-to-Argenteuil train near Clichy station. Seven passengers were killed and at least fifty badly injured.
- February 13 – United Kingdom – Two wagons and the guard's van were thrown off the viaduct over the River Almond, Scotland killing two guards and a telegraph boy.
- March 13 – Germany – Two passenger trains collided at Halle railway station; killing seven and injuring many.
- March 13 – United Kingdom – Two were killed by an accident on the Great Northern Railway, near Wakefield, Yorkshire.
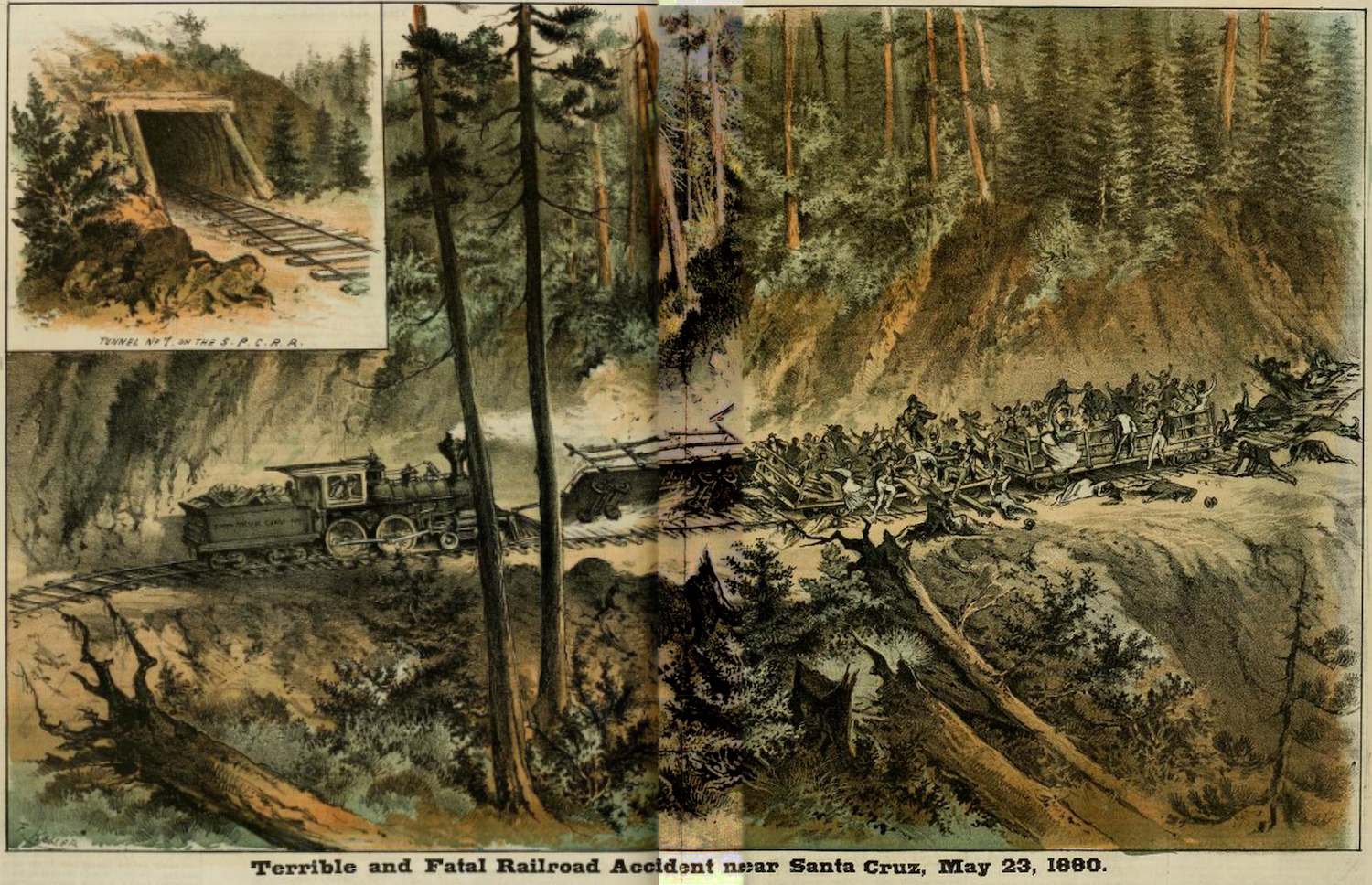
- Terrible and Fatal Railroad Accident near Santa Cruz, May 23, 1880.
  May 23 – United States — a South Pacific Coast Railroad excursion train from Big Trees to Santa Cruz, California derailed, throwing the passengers from overcrowded excursion-service flat cars onto the tracks. 15 died and over 50 were injured.
- May 30 – Canada – At Simcoe, Ontario, a Great Western Railway freight train ran through an open switch and derailed, killing the driver. The accident happened about 2:45 a.m. and the oil lamp which should have indicated the position of the switch was not burning.
- June 17 – United Kingdom – A bridge on the Hereford, Hay and Brecon Railway collapsed and a luggage train crashed into the river, killing the driver and severely or fatally injuring the stoker.
- June 24 – United Kingdom – A child riding on the engine of a mineral train died when the mineral train left the rails of a branch line, near Skinningrove Mine, Cleveland.
- August 10 – United Kingdom – An express passenger train derailed north of Berwick upon Tweed, Northumberland due to faulty track. Three people were killed.
- August 11 – United Kingdom – Wennington Junction rail crash - A Midland Railway passenger train derailed at Wennington, Lancashire. Eight people are killed and 23 are injured.
- August 19 – United Kingdom – A Midland Railway passenger train stopped inside Blea Moor Tunnel, Yorkshire due to a faulty brake pipe. An express passenger train overran signals collided with it at low speed.
- September 2 – United Kingdom – A Midland Railway passenger train left the rails on a sharp curve at the Manchester Central Station at 10:00 am. Several passengers and crew were injured.
- September 11 – New Zealand – The Rimutaka Incline railway accident on the Rimutaka Incline. A small train left Greytown at 8.30am bound for Wellington via the Rimutaka Incline. At Cross Creek at the foot of the incline, the train was rearranged with two passenger cars and the luggage carriage in front of the Fell Engine. Behind it were two wagons of timber, and the Fell brake van last. A strong northwest wind was blowing and, at a place called Siberia, a terrific gust blew the three leading carriages off the line. The couplings held and the weight of the engine plus the grip of the drivers on the centre-rail stopped them from falling to the valley below, but the body of the first carriage was torn off its chassis. The passengers were thrown out, three children were killed instantly, another died later, and some had horrific injuries. The inquest found the deaths accidental and no blame was attached to anyone. Wind shelters were later built on dangerous parts of the incline.
- September 11 – United Kingdom – A London and South Western Railway passenger train collided with a light engine at Nine Elms Locomotive Junction, London due to errors by signalmen and the fireman of the light engine. Seven people were killed.
- October 7 – United Kingdom – One of the carriages of an excursion train for Leamington overturned when leaving Kenilworth.
- October 27 – United Kingdom – A passenger train ran into a goods train near Mosesgate on the Lancashire and Yorkshire Railway. Several passengers were injured and about a dozen carriages and a number of wagons were damaged.
- October 28 – Belgium – A goods train ran down an incline, near Herstal and hit a passenger train, killing seven people with several injured.
- December 21 – United Kingdom – The Bristol, Derby and Sheffield express hit at Sheffield express at Holbeck Junction, near Leeds killing one and injuring forty.

== 1881 ==
- January 5 – Canada – A Quebec, Montreal, Ottawa and Occidental Railway freight train derailed on temporary track laid across the frozen Saint Lawrence River between Longueuil and Hochelaga. Locomotive No.31 plunged through the ice. The locomotive was salvaged five days later.
- March 4 – United Kingdom – At Porthmadog, a Festiniog Railway freight train coasting downhill with no locomotive — as was common practice on that narrow-gauge line — was misrouted into a shed because the points had not been returned to the normal setting. One man inside the shed was killed.
- April – United States – A train left the track and crashed through the side of a bridge at Albany, Illinois, drowning eight passengers.
- May 21 – United Kingdom – A London, Chatham and Dover Railway passenger train derailed at Crystal Palace, London killing one.
- June 23 – Mexico – In the Morelos railway accident near Cuautla, Morelos, a train fell into a river, killing over 200 people.
- July 6 – United States – Boone, Iowa: Honey Creek Bridge rail disaster: A Chicago and North Western Railway locomotive ran tender-first, westbound over the line out of Boone to check the tracks during a heavy summer rainstorm in the Des Moines River Valley and plunged into Honey Creek as the weakened bridge collapsed. Two railway employees died.
- August 14 – Canada – During the night Grand Trunk Railway train 4, an express from Montreal to Toronto, struck one of several cows on the track about 1.5 miles (2 km) west of Prescott. The fireman jumped clear but the engineer was killed as the locomotive and several cars derailed. Several others were injured, one of them was not expected to survive.

== 1882 ==
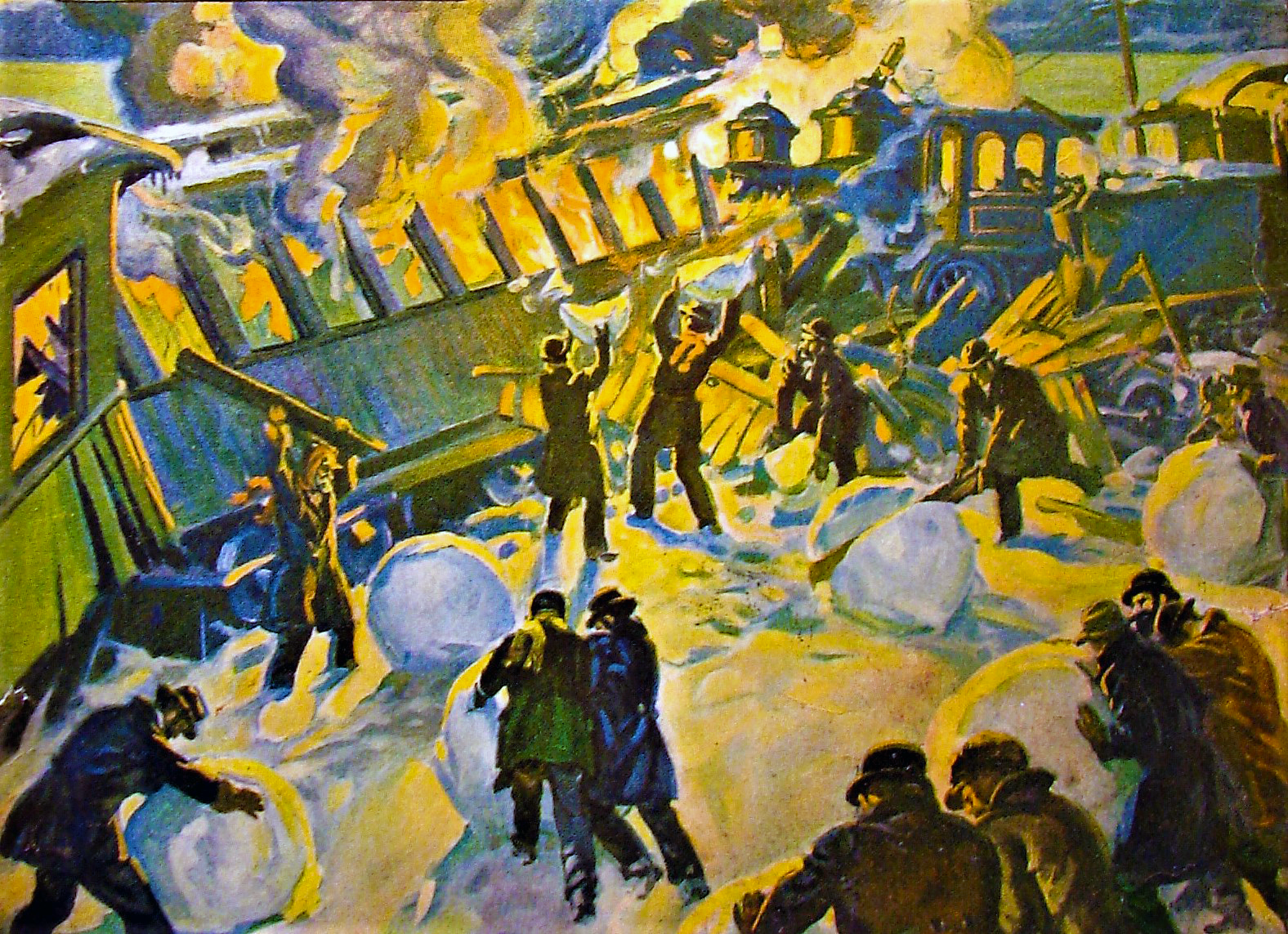
- 1882 Spuyten Duyvil train wreck
  January 13 – United States – 1882 Spuyten Duyvil train wreck: Hudson River Railroad's Tarrytown Special collided with rear of the halted Atlantic Express near Spuyten Duyvil in the New York City borough of The Bronx at night, telescoping the last two coaches which also caught fire. Frank Leslie's Illustrated Newspaper published a full front-page engraving a week later, showing trainmen, passengers, and local farmers rolling giant snowballs in an attempt to extinguish the blaze. State Senator and sleeping car magnate Webster Wagner was among the dead. This occurred almost a mile from a 2013 derailment that killed four
- June 30 – United States – Little Silver, New Jersey: Five of the seven cars of the Long Branch Railroad's Lightning Express, plunged off a trestle bridge near Little Silver, killing one man outright, with two men dying of their injuries later. Ulysses S. Grant was amongst the passengers of the train that day.
- July 13 – Russia – In the Tcherny railway accident, seven cars of a mail train fell into a sinkhole near Tcherny after a culvert collapsed in heavy rain. At least 42 were killed.
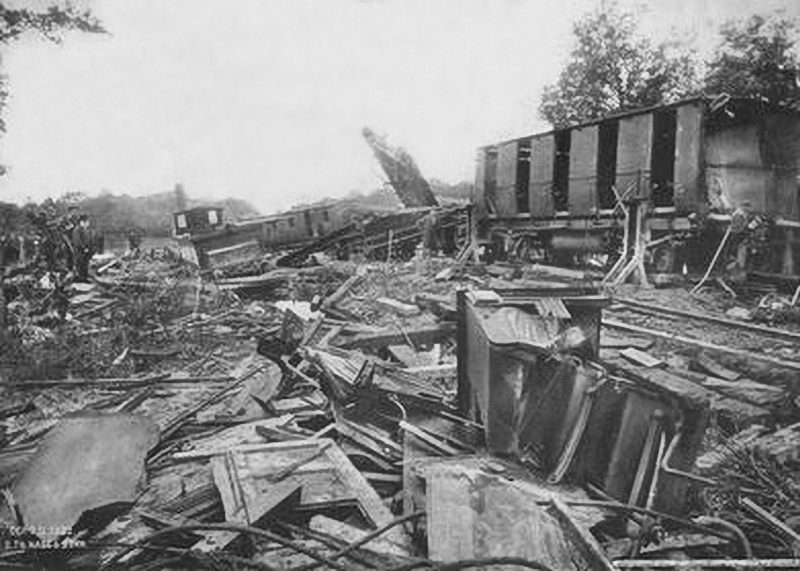
- Hugstetten rail disaster. (September 3, 1882)
  September 3 – Germany – Hugstetten: Hugstetten rail disaster - After heavy weather a washaway occurred and the train most probably was running too fast. 64 people were killed and 225 injured.
- September 23 – Austria–Hungary (Croatia) – Osijek rail accident: collapse of wooden railway bridge over the Drava River, damaged by flood driftwood, under the weigh of crossing train caused five of wagons to fall into the river and total loss of 28 lives.
- September 29 – United States – Apparently distracted by a malfunction on the steam dummy he was driving, an engineer missed a whistle signal and another danger signal and ran his passenger train onto the International Railway Bridge to cross from Black Rock (now part of Buffalo, New York, U.S.) to Victoria (now part of Fort Erie, Ontario, Canada) while one of the movable spans was open. The dummy and first car crashed into a shallow part of the Niagara River, killing the engineer and one passenger.

== 1883 ==
- January 1 – United Kingdom – A Cambrian Railways passenger train was struck by a landslide at Vriog, Merionethshire. The locomotive was pushed into the sea, but the carriages remained on the track. Both crew were killed.
- January 20 – United States – Tehachapi, California: 1883 Tehachapi train wreck - Brakes holding passenger cars on a Central Pacific train were apparently left unset during a locomotive change at Tehachapi Summit. As the runaway cars headed backward down the mountain, stoves tipped over and ignited the cars before derailment. A total of 21 people were killed in the disaster, many of whom were burned beyond recognition.
- March 8 – United Kingdom – Wotton, Brill Tramway: A lady's maid was run over and killed by a locomotive as she stood on the tracks watching it approach. This was the only fatality in the line's 64-year history.

== 1884 ==
- Alcudia bridge disaster
  April 27 – Spain – Alcudia bridge disaster: locomotive, carriages and cages derailed off from a bridge over the Alcudia river. 59 people were killed.
- June 7 – United Kingdom – A South Eastern Railway freight train ran into the rear of another at Sevenoaks, Kent due to a signalman's error. Two people were killed.
- July 16 – United Kingdom – Bullhouse Bridge rail accident: A locomotive axle failure caused the derailment of a passenger train at Penistone. 24 passengers were killed.

== 1885 ==
- January 1 – United Kingdom – Penistone rail crash, Penistone: An axle failure derailed an empty wagon into the path of a passenger train. One passenger was killed immediately and two died later.
- January – United Kingdom – A London and North Western Railway express passenger train overran signals and collided with a North Staffordshire Railway freight train near Stoke-on-Trent, Staffordshire. One person was killed.
- April 18 – United States – A Central Railroad of New Jersey locomotive falls through the Ken Lockwood Gorge Bridge into the South Branch Raritan River near High Bridge, New Jersey.
- September 15 – Canada – St Thomas, Ontario: An express goods train hauled by a Grand Trunk Railway locomotive hit a dwarf Asian elephant on an embankment. The elephant was thrown down the embankment by the collision; the train's engineer put the locomotive into reverse, but was unable to prevent a rear-end collision with an African elephant (the famous Jumbo), killing it and derailing the locomotive and tender.

== 1886 ==
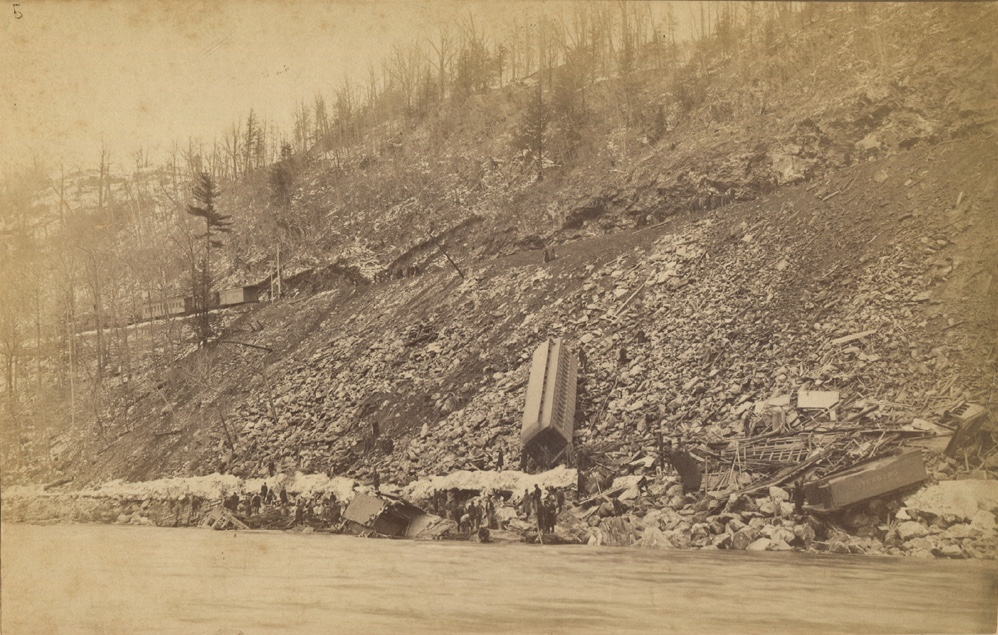
- Deerfield railway accident
  April 7 – United States – Deerfield railway accident – A washout outside of Deerfield, Massachusetts caused a passenger train to fall 100 feet (30 m) down an embankment, killing 11.
- September 14 – United States – A head-on collision in Silver Creek between a freight train and a passenger train killed twenty passengers when the smoking car telescoped.
- December – Russia – Two trains collided near Charkow. One of the engine drivers, three conductors and nine passengers killed, over thirty injured.

== 1887 ==
- January 4 – United States – Republic, Ohio: A head-on collision between a passenger train and a freight caused a fire killing thirteen passengers.
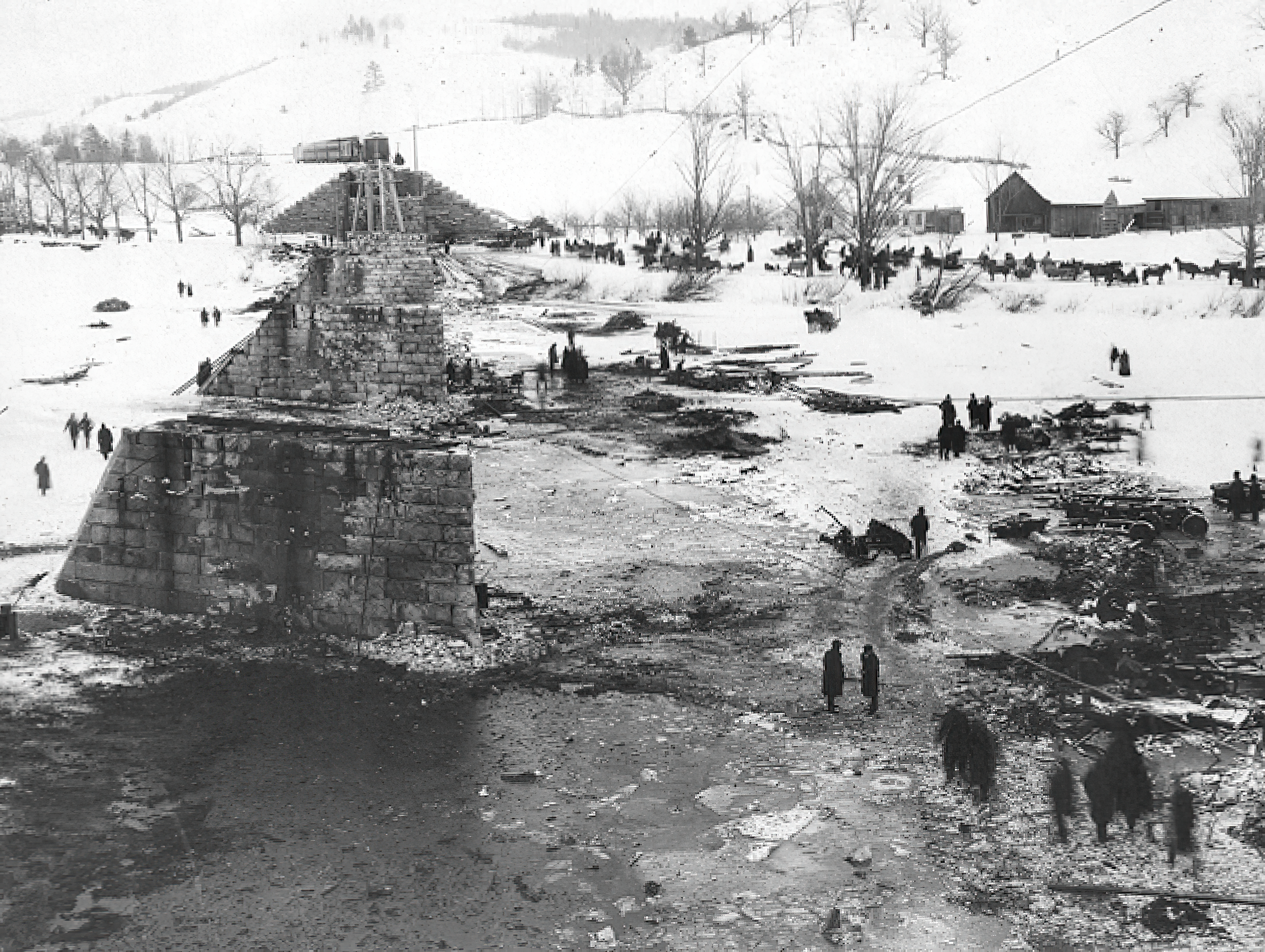
- 1887 Hartford Railroad Disaster
  February 5 – United States – 1887 Hartford Railroad Disaster: On the Vermont Central Railroad, in very cold weather, a rail broke under the Montreal Express train as it approached the 650-foot (200-metre) bridge over the White River. The derailed car pulled four others off the bridge and they crashed to the ground upside-down 42 ft (13 m) below and caught fire, also destroying the wooden bridge. There were 34 or at least 40 people killed.
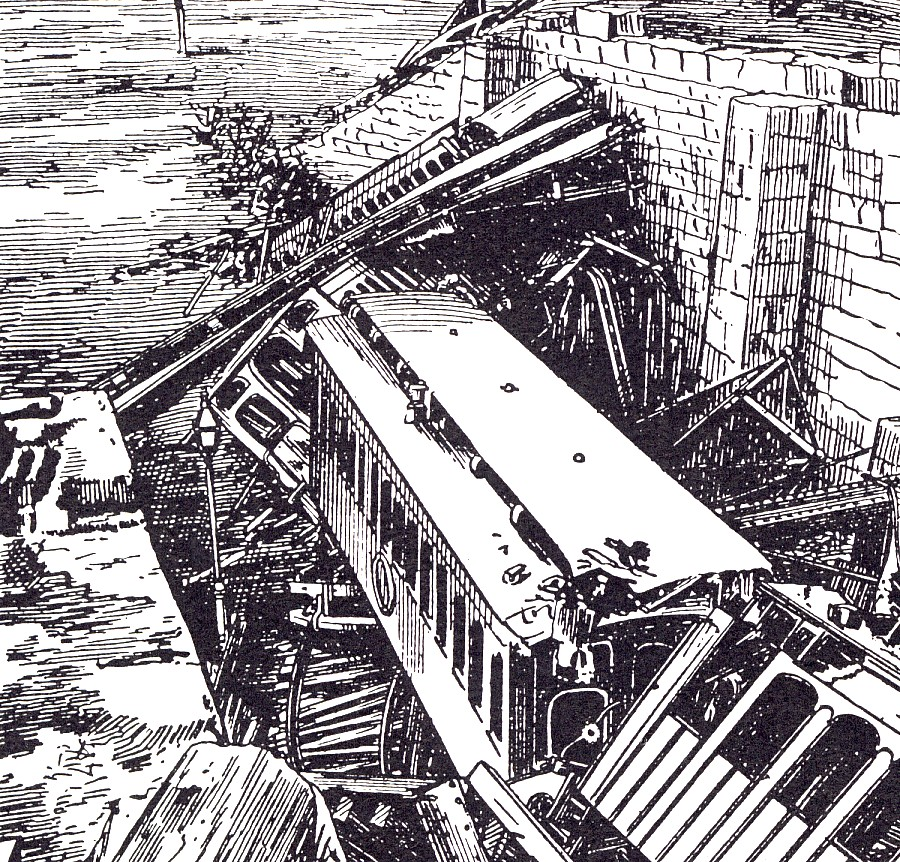
- Forest Hills disaster
  March 14 – United States – West Roxbury, Massachusetts: Forest Hills disaster; also, "The Forest Ridge Disaster" – The "Bussey Bridge", a Howe truss bridge at South Street in the Roslindale section of West Roxbury collapsed as a morning Boston & Providence Railroad train, inbound to Boston, passed killing 23 people and injuring over 100—the bridge design was found to be faulty.
- March 25 – United Kingdom – An express passenger train derailed at Morpeth, Northumberland due to defective track killing five people and injuring seventeen.
- April 26 – United Kingdom – a bomb planted by the Fenians in a first-class compartment exploded on the Metropolitan Railway near Aldersgate St. station, London, killing two people and injuring eight others. The first fatal terrorist attack against what is now the London Underground, it is one of a series of bombings of the Underground and other London landmarks.
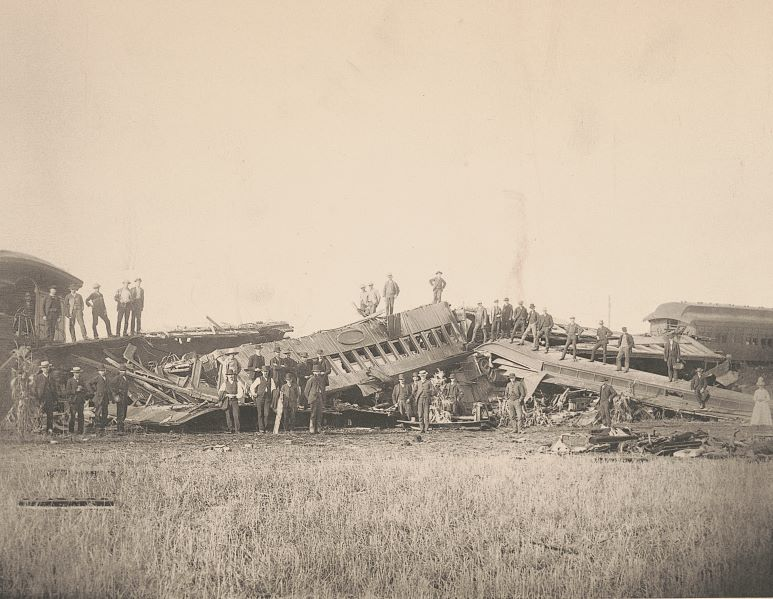
- 1887 Great Chatsworth train wreck
  August 10–11 – United States – Chatsworth, Illinois –1887 Great Chatsworth train wreck: A fifteen-car train of fully occupied Pullman sleepers and coaches on the Toledo, Peoria and Western bound for Niagara Falls, approached a wooden trestle over a shallow "run" just before midnight that was on fire. The engineer did not have sufficient time to stop the double-headed train with over 600 on board from crossing the weakened structure which collapsed under the lead engine. The cars in the front half telescoped into one another and some 84 were killed with injuries estimated at 279. This accident inspired the morbid ballad "The Chatsworth Wreck" that includes the verse, "the dead and dying mingled with the broken beams and bars; an awful human carnage, a dreadful wreck of cars."
- August 17 – United States – A Baltimore & Ohio express lost its air brakes entering Washington, D.C. The crew attempted to get the train under control using handbrakes, but were unsuccessful. The express then jumped the track at a Wye, and plowed into a signal house. The engine went into a garden and escaping steam scalded those in a nearby house.
- August 22 – United Kingdom – A Midland Railway freight train becomes divided at Wath-upon-Dearne, Yorkshire. Due to a signalman's error, an express passenger train ran into the rear of it. Seventeen people were injured.
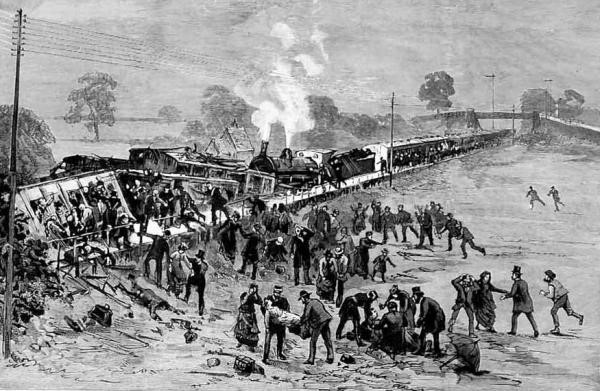
- Hexthorpe rail accident
  September 16 – United Kingdom – Hexthorpe rail accident, near Doncaster: The locomotive crew misread signals and crashed into rear of special train for racegoers killing twenty-five. The simple vacuum brakes were deemed inadequate by subsequent enquiry.
- October 11 – United States - A freight train crashed into a passenger train at a train intersection in Kouts, Indiana killing twenty and injuring nearly seventy.
- October 25 – United Kingdom – A freight train overran signals at Amble, Northumberland and collided with a locomotive. The locomotive was pushed back into a waiting passenger train, which itself was pushed back into a freight train.

== 1888 ==
- January 4 – Canada – Two freight trains of the Canadian Pacific Railway collided in the middle of a trestle near Mink, Ontario, about 135 miles (217 km) east of Port Arthur. About five crew members on the two trains were killed.
- March 16 – United States – North of Coleman's Station, Dutchess County, New York, : A New York Central snow-clearance train consisting of the plow "Old Eli" and five locomotives reached a rock cut clogged with snow, moving about 40 mph (64 km/h). The entire train derailed killing five crewmen.
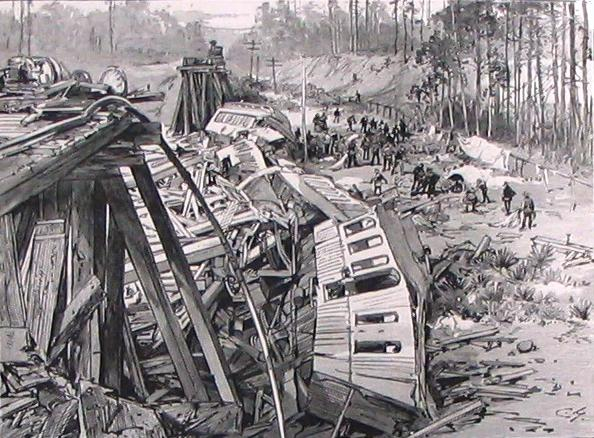
- Blackshear trestle wreck. (March 17, 1888)
  March 17 – United States – Blackshear, Georgia: Most of the West India Fast Mail Train from New York City to Jacksonville, Florida was wrecked when two-thirds of a 300-foot-long (91 m), 25-foot-high (7.6 m) trestle collapsed. A broken rail under the lead baggage car caused it to come off the tracks. The train safely crossed the bridge over the Hurricane River, but at about 9:30 a.m. the baggage car suddenly whirled over and struck the subsequent trestle, causing its collapse. All but the detached engine tumbled below — a combination car, three baggage cars, a smoking car, a coach, two Pullman sleepers, and the private car of the Lehigh Valley Railroad killing twenty and injuring 35. Among the latter was Elisha P. Wilbur, president of the Lehigh Valley Railroad, who together with members of his family and friends was traveling in the private car. George Gould and his wife escaped serious injury. The engine continued into town to get help.
- July 12 – United States – Wreck at the Fat Nancy, Virginia: Nine were killed and twenty-six were injured when a train trestle collapsed. One of the victims was a civil engineer who had designed a replacement for the trestle, since it was known to be unsafe. One of the passengers in the train was former Confederate Lieutenant General James Longstreet.
- August 6 – United Kingdom – A London and South Western Railway locomotive collided head-on with a passenger train at Hampton Wick, Middlesex due to a signalman's error. Four people were killed and fourteen seriously injured.
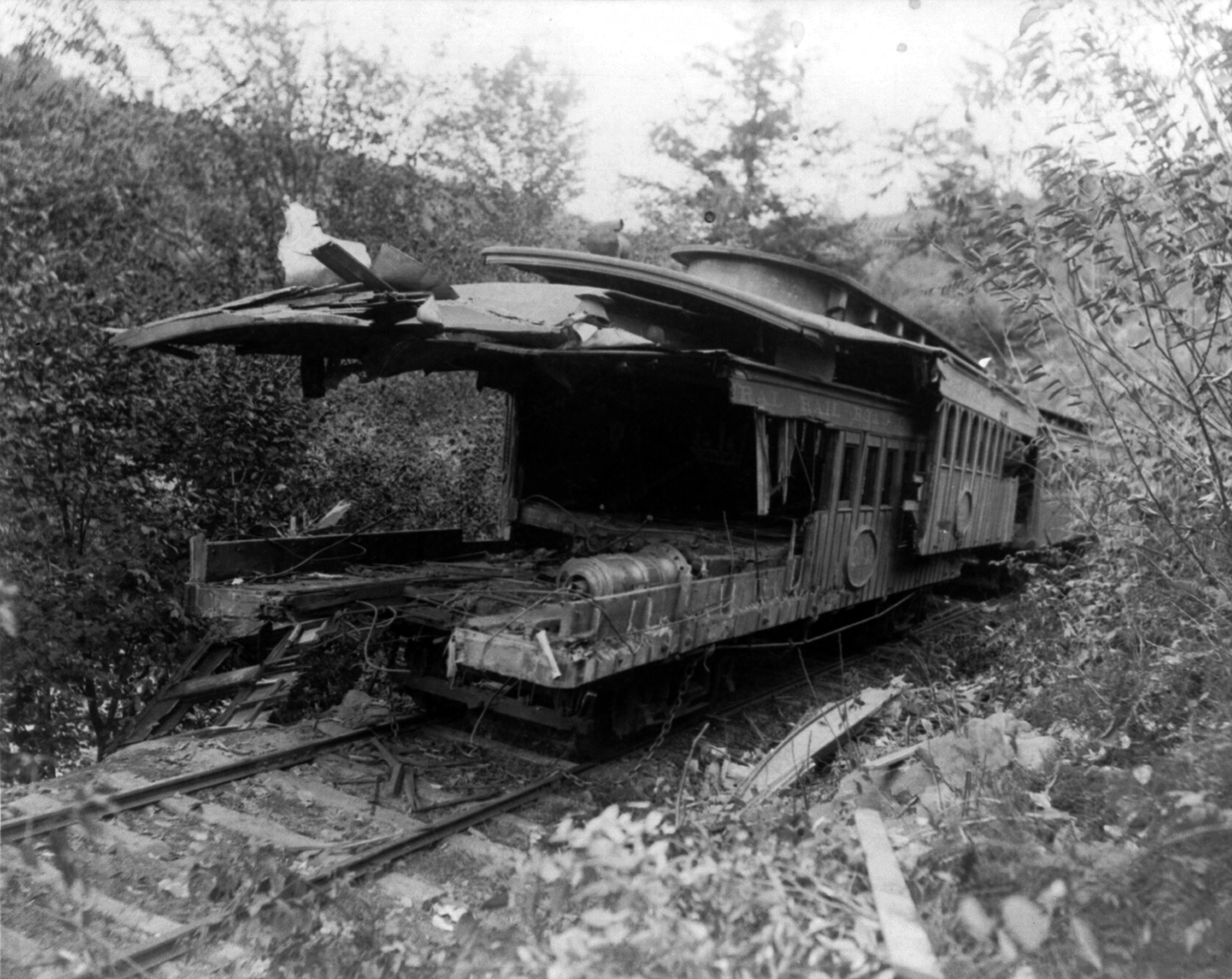
- Mud Run disaster
  October 10 – United States – Mud Run disaster, Pennsylvania: Following a mass meeting held by the Total Abstinence Union in the Pennsylvania mountains at Hazleton, the 5000 conventioneers were returning from Wilkes-Barre in eight special temperance trains operated by the Lehigh Valley Railroad. The trains were directed to keep a ten-minute interval between them. At about 8 p.m., the sixth train with 500 on board stopped near Mud Run along the banks of the Lehigh River and shortly thereafter the following train plowed into it, telescoping the last car of the stopped train halfway through the coach ahead, killing 66 of the 200 in these two wooden cars outright. More than 50 were injured. Newspaper accounts suggested that temperance pledges were forgotten by some of the victims after they returned to the train.
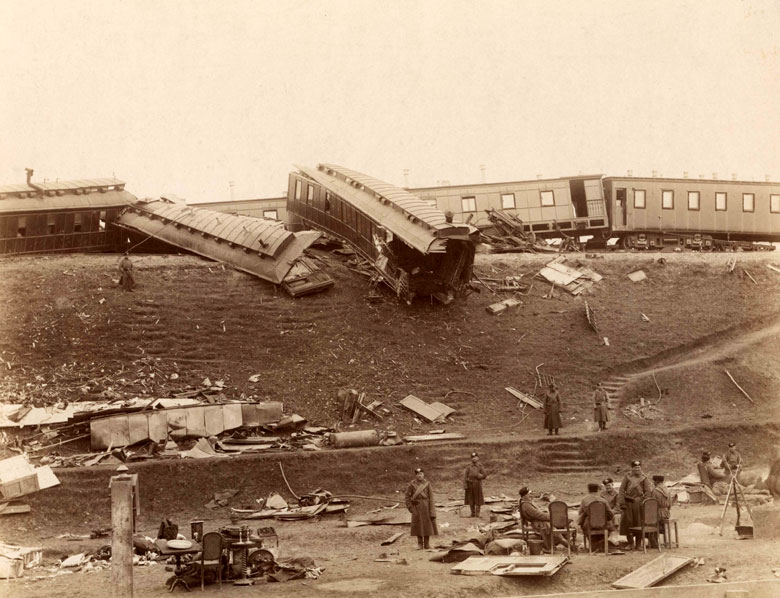
- Borki train disaster, (October 29, 1888)
  October 29 [O.S. October 17] 1888 – Russia – Borki train disaster. The imperial train, carrying Alexander III of Russia and his family, derailed near Borki in Kharkov Governorate. Twenty-one died on site, two in local hospitals. The popular story says that the tsar held up the mangled roof of the carriage, so that his family could escape from the wreckage. Alexander sustained a massive impact trauma to his back but was apparently not affected in any other way. Commissioner disagreed on the direct cause of the crash, citing speeding, substandard track and mismanagement by private railroad owners.

== 1889 ==
- January – United Kingdom – On the North Eastern Railway, the two sections of the Flying Scotsman train are both stopped by snow, and a plough attempting to clear the line at Killingworth collides with one of the stopped engines. One man is killed and locomotive designer Wilson Worsdell is seriously injured.
- January 14 — United States — Tallmadge, Ohio, on the New York Pennsylvania and Ohio railroad, a head on collision occurred around 2:30 am between west bound freight train No. 81 and east bound passenger train No. 8 due to a miscommunication between the freights, conductor and flagman. Eight people died, and 12 were injured.
- March 30 – United Kingdom – A Manchester, Sheffield and Lincolnshire Railway passenger train derailed at Penistone, Yorkshire due to a broken axle on a locomotive. A mail train ran into the wreckage killing one and injuring 61.
- May 12 – United States – Seattle, Washington, a streetcar descending Denny Hill suffered a cable malfunction and crashed after hitting a sharp curve. The crash killed one passenger and injured another. The crash marked the first streetcar fatality in the history of Seattle.
- May 23 – United States – The westbound train on the St. Louis and San Francisco road, which left St. Louis was wrecked at about 11:15 pm at a point three miles (4.8 km) west of Sullivan, Missouri.
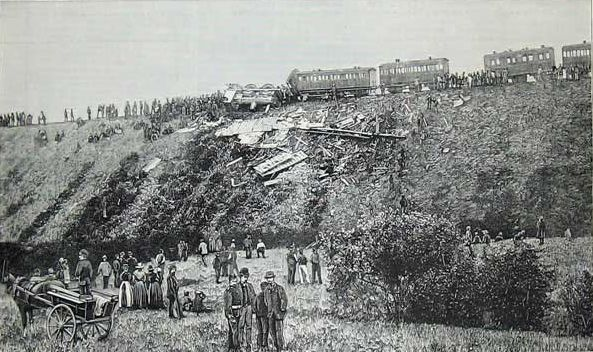
- Armagh rail disaster
  June 12 – United Kingdom – The Armagh rail disaster near Armagh, now in Northern Ireland: a train stalled on a gradient and the driver decided to divide it. Left unbraked, the rear portion ran away backwards and collided with a following train, killing 88. Parliament responded by passing the Regulation of Railways Act 1889, mandating fail-safe brakes and improved signal systems.
- July 2 – United States – In Thaxton, Virginia, during a heavy storm a Norfolk & Western passenger train was collapsed into a creek during a heavy storm at 1:25 AM, survivors were stranded for hours till rescue came, 18 people were killed and 21 were injured.
- August 22 – United States – An excursion train of dignitaries inspecting the newly completed route of the Knoxville, Cumberland Gap and Louisville Railroad between Knoxville and Middlesboro derailed at Flat Creek in Grainger County, Tennessee, killing five, including a Knoxville city alderman and the chairman of the board of public works, and injuring twenty.
- December 7 – United Kingdom – three trains collided near Cheetham Hill junction. A London and North-Western goods train with 27 wagons of coal bound for Oldham was waiting for a Lancashire and Yorkshire passenger train from Bacup to pass before using the junction to bear right onto the Oldham line. At 10:45 pm, a Lancashire and Yorkshire Railway passenger train heading from Victoria Station to Bacup set off on schedule and saw no warning light that a train was stopped on the line. It crashed into the back of the coal train, derailing and injuring many passengers as it hit the stationary train at around 14 MPH (23 km/h). The resulting debris blocked the other line and the passenger train coming from Bacup ran into this, also causing a derailment and many injuries to passengers. There was only one death and this was the fireman from the train that set off from Victoria Station, at the coroner's inquest it could not be determined whether he had jumped from the train or been violently thrown at impact, he had been trapped under the guard van from the goods train, when rescuers got to him he was past help.

== See also ==
- London Underground accidents

== Sources ==
- "Europe's history of rail disasters". BBC. October 11, 2006.
- "World's worst rail disasters". BBC. December 19, 2007.
- "GenDisasters Train Wrecks 1869–1943". Archived from the original on 2015-04-16.
- "Interstate Commerce Commission Investigations of Railroad Accidents 1911–1993". U.S. Department of Transportation. Archived from the original on 2004-10-12.
- Beebe, Lucius & Clegg, Charles (1952). Hear the train blow; a pictorial epic of America in the railroad age. New York: Grosset & Dunlap. ASIN B000I83FTC.
- Earnshaw, Alan (1990). Trains in Trouble: Vol. 6. Penryn: Atlantic Books. ISBN 0-906899-37-0.
- Earnshaw, Alan (1991). Trains in Trouble: Vol. 7. Penryn: Atlantic Books. ISBN 0-906899-50-8.
- Earnshaw, Alan (1993). Trains in Trouble: Vol. 8. Penryn: Atlantic Books. ISBN 0-906899-52-4.
- Griswold, Wesley S. (1969). Train Wreck!. Stephen Greene Press. ISBN 0-8289-0099-X.
- Haine, Edgar A. (1993). Railroad Wrecks. New York: Cornwall Books. ISBN 978-0-8453-4844-4.
- Hall, Stanley (1990). The Railway Detectives. London: Ian Allan. ISBN 0-7110-1929-0.
- Hoole, Ken (1982). Trains in Trouble: Vol. 3. Redruth: Atlantic Books. ISBN 0-906899-05-2.
- Hoole, Ken (1983). Trains in Trouble: Vol. 4. Truro: Atlantic Books. ISBN 0-906899-07-9.
- Karr, Ronald D. (1995). The Rail Lines of Southern New England – A Handbook of Railroad History. Branch Line Press. ISBN 978-0-942147-02-5.
- Kidner, R. W. (1977) [1963]. The South Eastern and Chatham Railway. Tarrant Hinton: The Oakwood Press.
- Leslie, Frank (1882-01-21). Illustrated Newspaper. Vol. LIII, no. 1374. New York. p. 1.
- Reed, Robert C. (1968). Train Wrecks – A Pictorial History of Accidents on the Main Line. New York: Bonanza Books. ISBN 978-0-517-32897-2.
- Rolt, L. T. C.; Kichenside, G. M. (1982). Red for Danger: A history of railway accidents and railway safety (4th ed.). Newton Abbot, Devon: David & Charles. ISBN 0-7153-8362-0. OCLC 9526651.
- Shaw, Robert B. (1978). A History of Railroad Accidents, Safety Precautions and Operating Practices. LCCN 78104064.
- Trevena, Arthur (1980). Trains in Trouble: Vol. 1. Redruth: Atlantic Books. ISBN 0-906899-01-X.
- Trevena, Arthur (1981). Trains in Trouble: Vol. 2. Redruth: Atlantic Books. ISBN 0-906899-03-6.
