= Green River Covered Bridge =

- U.S. National Register of Historic Places
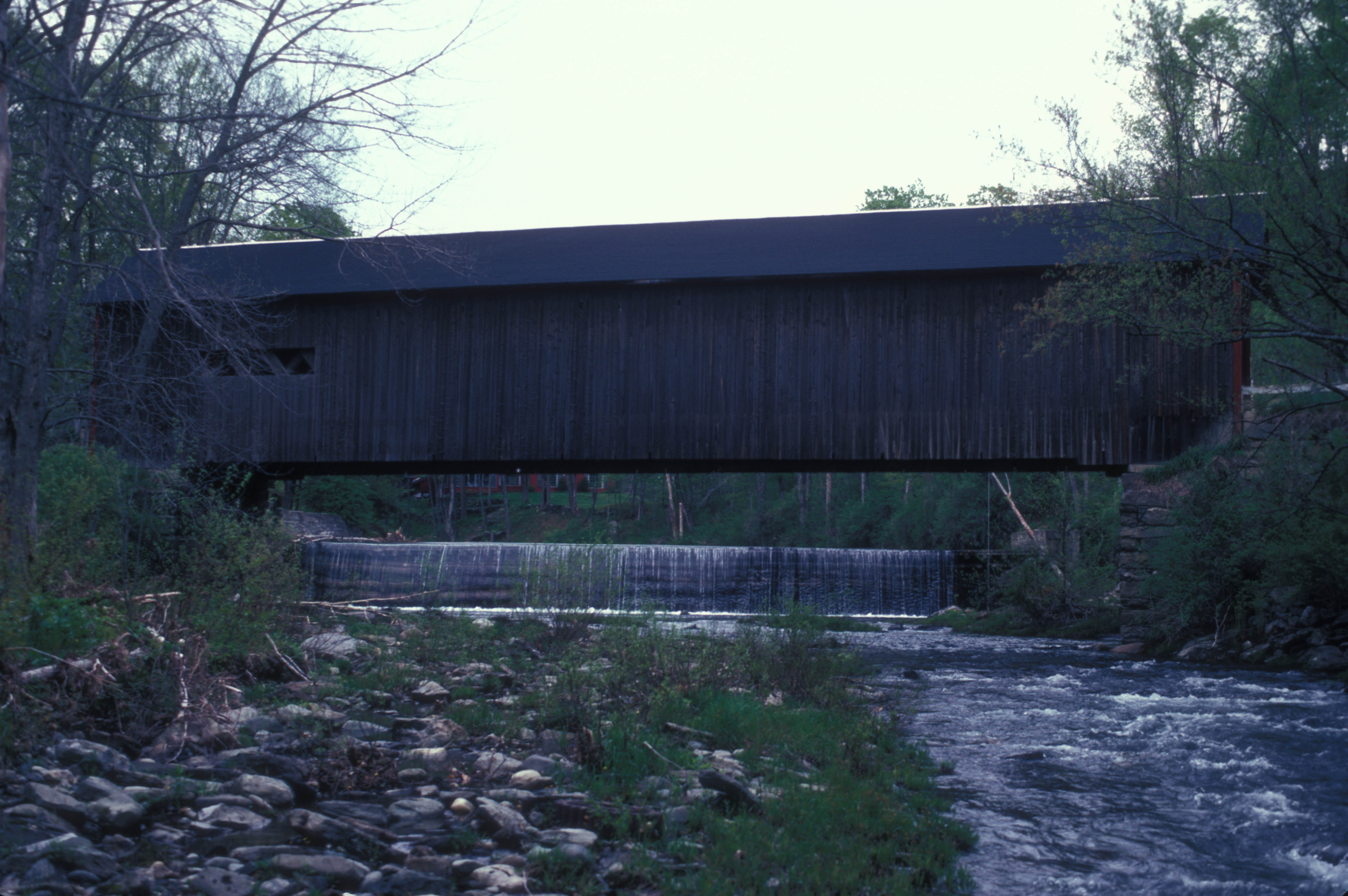

- Location within Vermont Location within the United States
- Location: Across the Green River, Guilford, Vermont
- Coordinates: 42°46′31″N 72°40′4″W
- Area: 1 acre (0.40 ha)
- Built: 1870
- Architectural style: Town lattice truss
- NRHP reference No.: 73000203
- Added to NRHP: August 28, 1973

The Green River Covered Bridge is a covered bridge in western Guilford, Vermont. Built in the 1870s by Marcus Worden, it is a Town lattice truss bridge, carrying Green River Road over the eponymous river in a small rural village of the same name. It was listed on the National Register of Historic Places in 1973.

== Description and history ==
The Green River Covered Bridge is located in far western Guilford, at the junction of Green River Road with the Jacksonville Stage Road. The bridge spans the Green River, a generally south-flowing tributary of the Deerfield and Connecticut Rivers. The bridge is 105 feet (32 m) long, with a road width of 15 feet (4.6 m) and a total width of 18.5 feet (5.6 m). It rests on dry-laid stone abutments that have been capped in concrete. The bridge trusses are built out of large planks to the patented design of Ithiel Town, and the bridge floor has been reinforced with laminated beams. The sides of the bridge are clad in vertical board siding, and the gabled ends of the bridge are finished in flushboard.

The bridge was built in the 1870s, and forms an important visual component of the village of Green River, which includes modestly scaled 19th century buildings, an old mill pond, and features unpaved roads and few modern intrusions. Because of its remote location it does not see the heavy traffic that has stressed other covered bridges in the state.

== See also ==
- Green River Crib Dam, just upriver from the bridge
- National Register of Historic Places listings in Windham County, Vermont
- List of bridges on the National Register of Historic Places in Vermont
- List of Vermont covered bridges
