= Green River Crib Dam =

- U.S. National Register of Historic Places
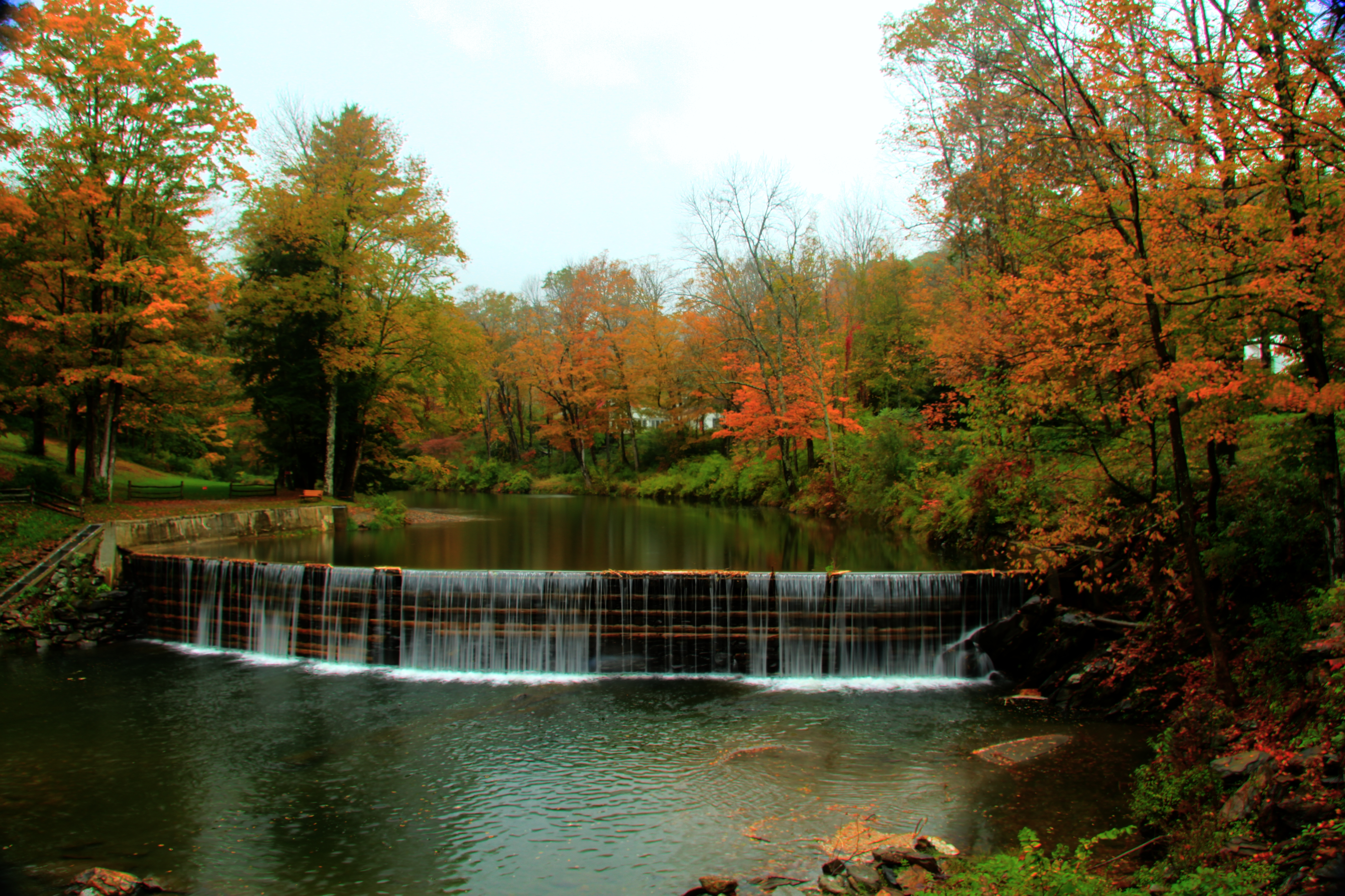

- Location within Vermont Location within the United States
- Location: Upstream from the Green River Covered Bridge, Guilford, Vermont
- Coordinates: 42°46′32″N 72°40′4″W
- Area: 1 acre (0.40 ha)
- Built: 1811
- NRHP reference No.: 95000374
- Added to NRHP: April 7, 1995

The Green River Crib Dam is a historic 19th-century dam on the Green River in western Guilford, Vermont. Built about 1811, it is a reminder of the modest industrial enterprises once conducted in the area using the water power it provided, and is one of the state's few surviving crib dams. It was listed on the National Register of Historic Places in 1995.

== Description and history ==
The dam is located in far western Guilford, upstream of the Green River Covered Bridge, which spans the Green River at the junction of Green River Road with Jacksonville Stage Road. The dam is about 110 feet (34 m) long, with a maximum height of 10.5 feet (3.2 m), and spans the river in a semicircle open to the downstream side. The material of the dam mostly logs and rubble, with plank facing. The abutments of the dam are now a combination of stone and concrete, the wing wall on the east side extending downstream toward the bridge, where it formed part of the foundation of a now-destroyed mill.

The earliest recorded documentation of a dam on this site dates to 1811, when Jonah Cutting is known to have a paper and linseed oil mill operating at the site. Some of the materials of the present dam may well date to this period. By 1856 the mill is only documented as being used for paper production. In 1869 a major flood apparently damaged the mill beyond repair, and it may also have damaged the dam; it washed out the bridge then standing just downstream. In 1871 Henry Stowe erected a lumber and grist mill on the site, which operated until 1918, when it was destroyed by fire. The dam has since then been maintained by private owners, forming a picturesque part of the small Green River village and a reminder of its modest industrial past.

== See also ==
- National Register of Historic Places listings in Windham County, Vermont
