= Chatsworth train accident =

Chatsworth train accident can refer to:

- 2008 Chatsworth train collision in southern California
- 1887 Great Chatsworth train wreck in eastern Illinois
