= Charlotte Township =

Charlotte Township may refer to the following townships in the United States:

- Charlotte Township, Livingston County, Illinois
- Charlotte Township, Bates County, Missouri
