= Tcherny railway accident =

Railway accident in Russia in 1882

Coordinates: 53°25′17″N 36°45′37″E

In the Tcherny railway accident near Tcherny, Russia on 13 July 1882, a train was derailed and more than 40 people killed. This rail accident was one of the 20 most serious accidents (by death toll) before 1953.

== In popular culture ==
- Character George Russell references the Tcherny accident in The Gilded Age episode "The Long Ladder" (Season 1, Episode 4).

== See also ==
- List of rail accidents (1880–1899)
- List of Russian rail accidents
