= Deerfield railway accident =

1886 railroad accident in Massachusetts

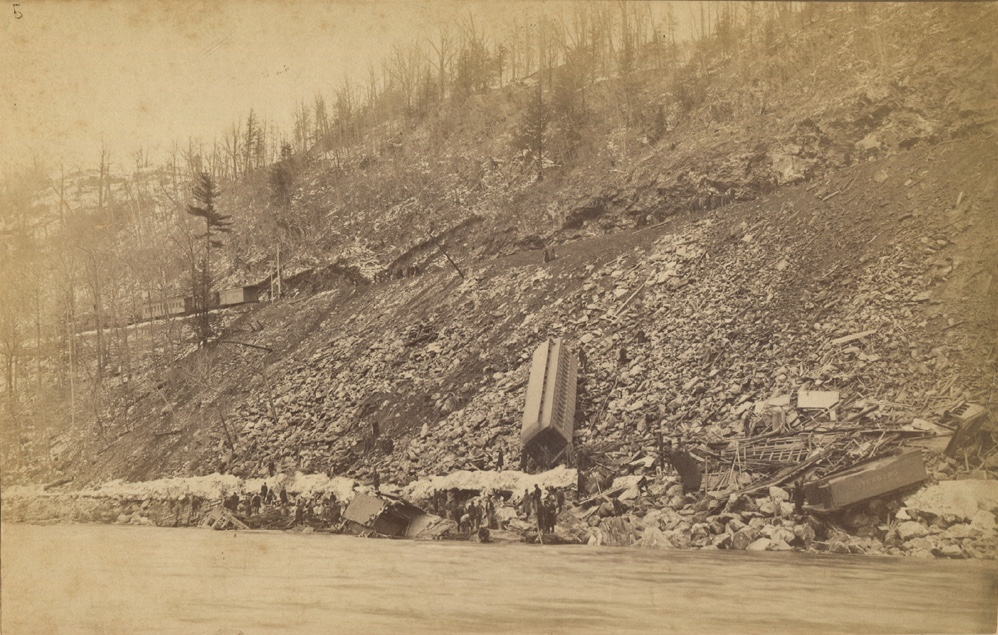
- Aftermath of the accident

Details
- Date: April 7, 1886 (140 years ago); 6:00 pm
- Location: Deerfield, Massachusetts
- Coordinates: 42°32′25″N 72°39′18″W
- Country: U.S.
- Line: Hoosac Tunnel line
- Operator: Fitchburg Railroad
- Owner: Commonwealth of Massachusetts
- Service: Commonwealth of Massachusetts
- Incident type: Derailment
- Cause: Slide of embankment under the track

Statistics
- Trains: 1
- Passengers: 39
- Crew: 9
- Deaths: 11
- Injured: 36

The Deerfield railway accident occurred on April 7, 1886, outside of Deerfield, Massachusetts. 11 people were killed after "the outer rail and a portion of the track gave way", which caused Passenger Train No. 35 to fall 100 feet (30 m) down an embankment bordering the Deerfield River, approximately 1.6 miles (2.6 km) downstream of Bardwell's Ferry Bridge.

== Accident ==
Around 4:45 pm, Passenger Train No. 35 departed North Adams, Massachusetts, for Boston with 48 people on board, nine of whom were crew. The train was traveling on the Hoosac Tunnel line, which was owned and maintained by the state and operated by the Fitchburg Railroad. The train was made up of an engine, tender, two baggage cars (one express car and one post office car), a smoking car (belonging to the Fitchburg Railroad), two passenger coaches (one belonging to Fitchburg the other to the Troy and Boston Railroad), and a parlor car.

Shortly before 6 pm, the outer rail and a portion of the track between the Bardwell's Ferry and West Deerfield stations gave way. The locomotive was wrecked and cars were thrown 100 feet (30 m) down an embankment. Three of the cars caught fire almost immediately. All of the cars except for the Troy and Boston coach were destroyed. All but one of the 48 people on the train were injured and 11 were killed instantly or died from their injuries. H. P. Littlejohn, the engineer, although mortally injured, crawled back up to the tracks and walked approximately one-half mile (0.80 km) to flag down any approaching train to avoid further incident; he died the following day.

A special train containing physicians, reporters, and others who could assist was dispatched from Greenfield, Massachusetts, shortly after 10 pm. The steepness of the embankment made rendering aid very difficult. The injured were transported to Shelburne Falls, Massachusetts, and the deceased to Greenfield.

== Investigation ==
The Massachusetts Railroad Commission found that "the cause of the disaster was a slide of part of the embankment". The embankment slide was caused by three construction faults:

- First, that wooden crib-work had been buried under dirt and rock within the embankment. Over time, the wood rotted in the moist soil. The presence of this structure was not known to contemporary railroad personnel.
- Second, cancellation of plans to build a culvert to drain water from a ditch on the north side of the track to the river, due to lack of funding.
- Third, the weakened southern slope of the embankment had been weighed down by broken rock that had been dumped there during the addition of a second track.

Approximately two hours before the accident, a freight train had passed over the section of track in question without incident, and a track walker who had passed over the location approximately 45 minutes later saw no indication of a problem.

The commission added that there was "no evidence or suggestion of any fault of negligence or otherwise on the part of the Fitchburg Railroad Company, or of any one in its service."

== See also ==
- List of disasters in Massachusetts by death toll
