= San Antonio River (Mexico) =

River in Mexico

Location
- Country: Mexico
- State: Morelos

The San Antonio River (Mexico) is a river of Mexico. On June 23, 1881, 200 people were killed and 40 injured as a train fell into the river when the Puente de Escontzin collapsed in the Morelos railway accident near Cuautla, Morelos.

== See also ==
- List of rivers of Mexico
