= Bear Swamp Hydroelectric Power Station =

Coordinates: 42°41′06″N 72°58′36″W

Bear Swamp Generating Station or Jack Cockwell Station is a pumped-storage hydroelectric underground power station that straddles the Deerfield River in Rowe and Florida, Massachusetts.

The reservoir covers 88 acres (36 ha), storing about 1.7 billion gallons at an elevation of 1,600 feet (490 m) above sea level, 770 feet (230 m) higher than the lower reservoir. To move the huge volumes of water (8,800 cubic feet per second uphill and 10,760 cf/s downhill) in both directions, Bear Swamp uses reversible water turbines of the Francis type.

Construction started in 1968 and was completed in 1974. New England Power Company developed Bear Swamp with the intention of absorbing and storing some of the excess electrical power from the Yankee Rowe Nuclear Power Station which was located nearby (almost adjacent) on the Deerfield River, and was then in operation at the time Bear Swamp was constructed. Yankee Rowe was later decommissioned in 1991, however Bear Swamp continues operate by absorbing electrical power from the grid and later returning electrical power to the grid. Although not perfectly efficient, the power is stored when demand is off peak, when supply is in excess and demand is low resulting in that power being low priced. Power is later returned to the grid, but at a much higher price during peak load periods when New England's electricity consumers place the heaviest demand on the system.

The station can produce about 600 megawatts of power for up to 6 hours during the day. The station can respond from zero to full capacity in under 10 minutes.

An underground visitor' center provides an automated slide show and other information about the history of the project and its site. More than 60,000 guests visit this location each year.

== See also ==
- ISO New England
