= Chatsworth, Illinois =

- Town
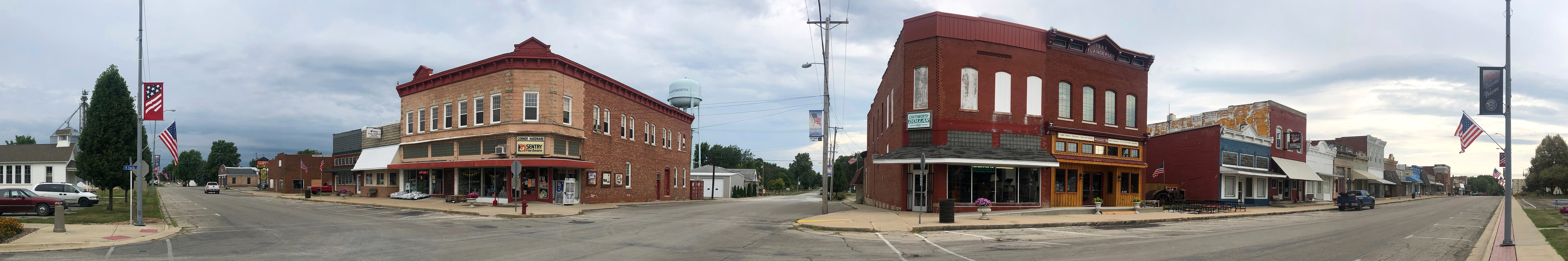
- Buildings along Locust Street
- Motto: Bluebird capital of Illinois
- Location in Livingston County, Illinois
- Coordinates: 40°44′15″N 88°17′50″W
- Country: United States
- State: Illinois
- County: Livingston
- Townships: Chatsworth, Charlotte
- Incorporated: March 8, 1867

Area
  - Total: 2.76 sq mi (7.1 km^{2})
  - Land: 2.76 sq mi (7.1 km^{2})
  - Water: 0.01 sq mi (0.026 km^{2}) 0.22%
- Elevation: 781 ft (238 m)

Population (2020)
  - Total: 1,185
  - Density: 441.9/sq mi (170.62/km^{2})
- Time zone: UTC-6 (CST)
  - Summer (DST): UTC-5 (CDT)
- ZIP code: 60921
- Area codes: 815 & 779
- FIPS code: 17-12710
- GNIS feature ID: 2396640
- Website: www.chatsworthil.gov

Chatsworth is an incorporated town in Livingston County, Illinois, United States. The population was 1,332 at the 2020 census.

== History ==
=== Founding ===
Chatsworth was laid out by Zeno Secor (1809 – 1875) and Cornelia Gilman on June 8, 1859. Both founders were from New York. Secor was a member of the Board of Directors of the company that was building the Peoria and Oquawka Railroad. He was a noted civil engineer and marine engine designer, who was involved with a number of railroads. Secor was later president of the Toledo Peoria and Western Railroad. Secor is best known for building a number of ironclad warships for the Union Navy. Cornelia Gilman was perhaps the person of that name who was the wife of Samuel Gilman, another director of the firm, and the man who gave his name to the nearby town of Gilman. The town of Chatsworth is perhaps named for Chatsworth House, the home of the Duke of Devonshire. Trains were running along the Peoria and Oquawka Railroad before the town was platted. The railroad soon became the Toledo, Peoria and Western.

Plattdeutsch-speaking East Friselanders settled in the Chatsworth area beginning in the late 1850s, establishing the Zion Lutheran church.

=== Original design ===
Chatsworth was surveyed by Nelson Buck, the County Surveyor of Livingston County. However, the plan used was virtually identical to that used at Fairbury, including the street names, and very similar to that used at Gridley, El Paso and other places along the Peoria and Oquawka Railroad. This suggests that the railroad supplied the plan from which Buck worked. Like these other towns, Chatsworth was centered on a long narrow depot grounds rather than a public square. The plat of the original town was exceptionally large, covering 160 acres (0.65 km^{2}) and consisting of 42 blocks, most located north of the railroad. The early depot was on the south side of the tracks. Block 16 of the plat was not divided into lots, and 1878 was listed as the City Park. It was eventually planted with over 500 maple trees, and a pavilion was added in 1962.

=== Growth ===
The first building was a 1 1/2-story frame structure used as both a residence and store, which was built by Charles D. Brooks and Truman Brockway of New York. Brooks was the first postmaster and the first grain dealer. Early growth of the town was very rapid, and by 1870 Chatsworth had 999 people. The first hotel was the Cottage House, built by Samuel Patton. Soon a newspaper, the Plaindealer, was being published. In 1879 a second railroad, the Kankakee and Southwestern, passed through the town and was given a right of way down Second Street. In 1887 the town rendered aid in the train accident known as the Great Chatsworth Train Wreck. Telephone service came in 1883, and an electric light plant was built in 1894. In March 1924 seventy to one hundred men arrived in town to work on a paved highway, at first known as the Corn Belt Trail, which soon became Route 24 and formed an important east–west route across Illinois.

== Geography ==
Chatsworth is located in southeastern Livingston County in northern Chatsworth Township, with a small panhandle extending north into Charlotte Township. The town limits also extend south from the town center and include a large undeveloped area in central Chatsworth Township.

U.S. Route 24 runs through the town south of the town center, leading east 15 miles (24 km) to Interstate 57 at Gilman and west 23 miles (37 km) to Interstate 55 at Chenoa.

According to the 2021 census gazetteer files, Chatsworth has a total area of 2.76 square miles (7.15 km^{2}), of which 2.76 square miles (7.15 km^{2}) (or 99.78%) is land and 0.01 square miles (0.03 km^{2}) (or 0.22%) is water.

== Demographics ==
Historical population
Census	Pop.	Note	%±
1860	20		—
1870	999		4,895.0%
1880	1,054		5.5%
1890	827		−21.5%
1900	1,038		25.5%
1910	1,112		7.1%
1920	1,087		−2.2%
1930	981		−9.8%
1940	1,036		5.6%
1950	1,119		8.0%
1960	1,330		18.9%
1970	1,255		−5.6%
1980	1,187		−5.4%
1990	1,186		−0.1%
2000	1,265		6.7%
2010	1,205		−4.7%
2020	1,185		−1.7%
U.S. Decennial Census

=== 2020 census ===
As of the 2020 census there were 1,185 people, 603 households, and 323 families residing in the town. The population density was 428.88 inhabitants per square mile (165.59/km^{2}). There were 562 housing units at an average density of 203.40 per square mile (78.53/km^{2}). Of the 562 housing units, 14.6% were vacant. The homeowner vacancy rate was 7.1% and the rental vacancy rate was 8.8%.

The racial makeup of the town was 89.96% White, 0.84% African American, 0.00% Native American, 0.76% Asian, 0.00% Pacific Islander, 2.28% from other races, and 6.16% from two or more races. Hispanic or Latino of any race were 7.93% of the population.

There were 603 households, out of which 25.9% had children under the age of 18 living with them, 33.00% were married couples living together, 9.45% had a female householder with no husband present, and 46.43% were non-families. 37.48% of all households were made up of individuals, and 7.63% had someone living alone who was 65 years of age or older. The average household size was 2.85 and the average family size was 2.21.

The town's age distribution consisted of 20.7% under the age of 18, 12.2% from 18 to 24, 18.5% from 25 to 44, 35.2% from 45 to 64, and 13.5% who were 65 years of age or older. The median age was 44.5 years. For every 100 females, there were 119.4 males. For every 100 females age 18 and over, there were 114.2 males.

The median income for a household in the town was $50,417, and the median income for a family was $42,434. Males had a median income of $41,534 versus $21,036 for females. The per capita income for the town was $25,587. About 16.7% of families and 21.6% of the population were below the poverty line, including 32.1% of those under age 18 and 9.4% of those age 65 or over.

Racial composition as of the 2020 census
Race	Number	Percent
White	1,066	90.0%
Black or African American	10	0.8%
Native American and Alaska Native	0	0.0%
Asian	9	0.8%
Native Hawaiian and Other Pacific Islander	0	0.0%
Some other race	27	2.3%
Two or more races	73	6.2%
Hispanic or Latino (of any race)	94	7.9%

== Notable people ==
- Alice Gentle, opera singer

== Gallery ==
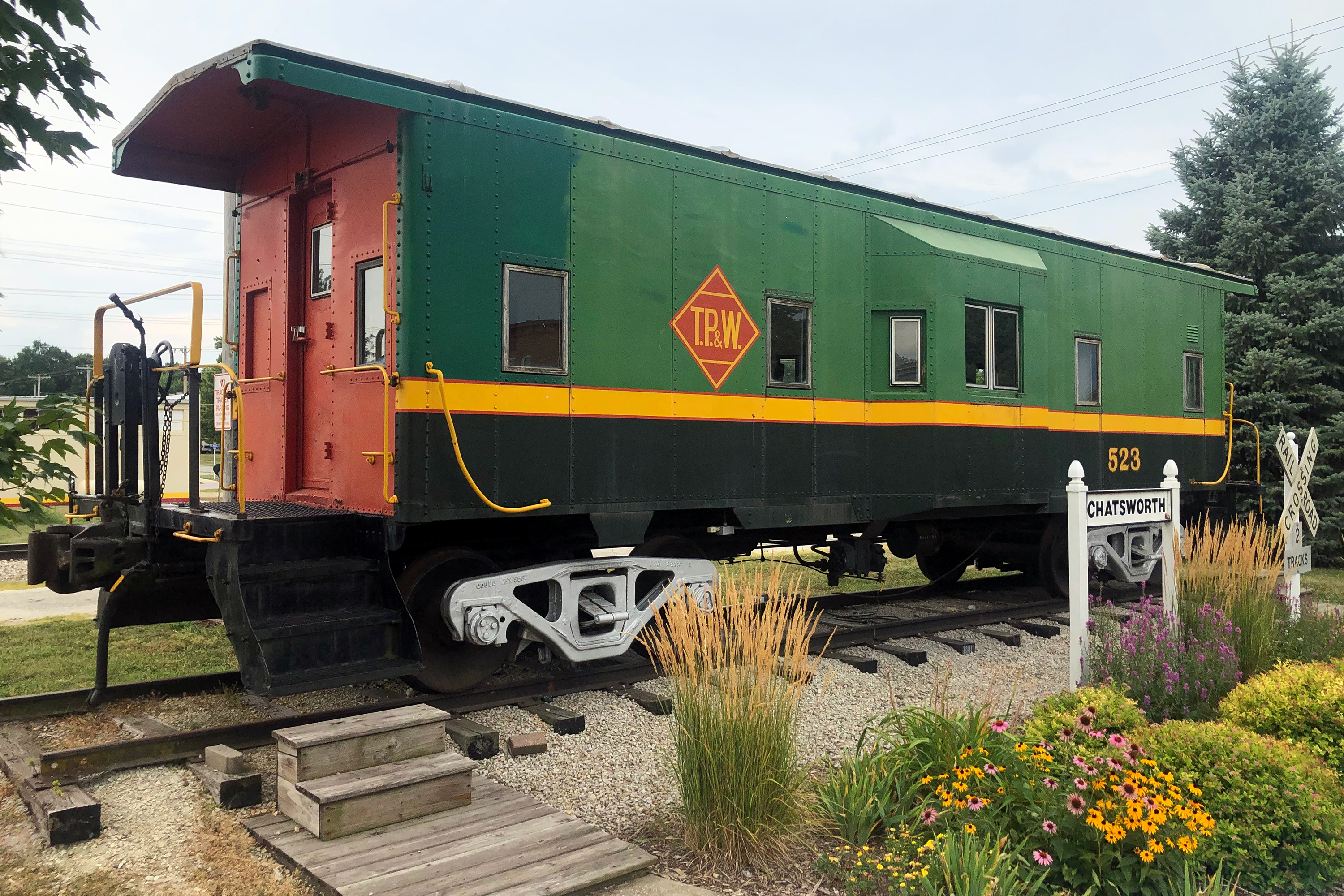
Caboose on Locust Street

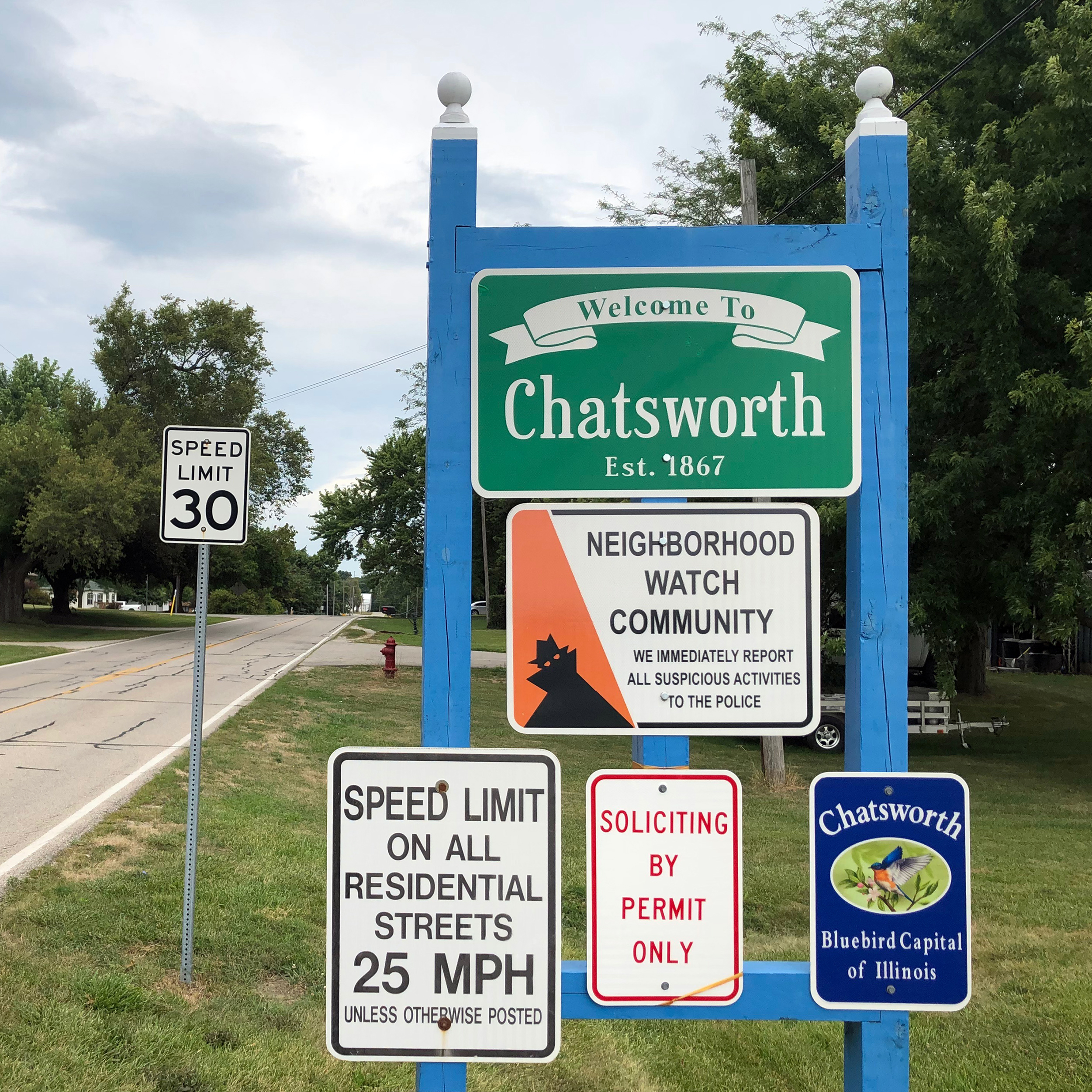
Town signs on South 7th
