= 1882 Osijek rail accident =

1882 railway bridge collapse disaster in Osijek, Austria-Hungary (Croatia)

- Rail disaster in Esseg (Osijek, Das interessante Blatt, 1882)

Details
- Date: 23 September 1882 c. 2:10 PM
- Location: Osijek, Transleithania
- Coordinates: 45.560306°N 18.706308°E
- Country: Austria-Hungary (present-day Croatia)
- Line: Beli Manastir–Osijek railway
- Operator: Alföld-Fiume Railway Company
- Incident type: Bridge collapse

Statistics
- Deaths: 28
- Injured: about 20

The 1882 Osijek rail accident occurred on 23 September 1882 in Osijek, Austria-Hungary (present-day Croatia) on the Beli Manastir–Osijek railway. The wooden railway bridge over the Drava River damaged by flood debris collapsed under the weigh of crossing train, causing five of its wagons to fall into the river and total loss of 28 lives. It is recorded as one of the first major rail accidents in the history of rail transport in Croatia, and also the railway history of Austro-Hungarian Empire.

== First Osijek railway bridge ==
The railway line between Budapest and Osijek of the Alföld-Fiume Railway Company (Alföld-Fiumaner Eisenbahn), becoming fully operational in late 1870, grew as only the second railway line in historic area of Croatia. Before Osijek it had to cross the Drava river to reach its south bank where the city railway station was erected. A wooden-structure bridge, based on the system developed by British engineer William Howe, was built over the Drava with nine piers in a distance of 30 meters each. Being provisional, construction of a new iron bridge on stone piers had begun upstream in early 1882.

== Accident ==
September 1882 brought heavy rains in Austrian Carinthia and Tyrol regions, leading to extreme flooding of Drava and bringing considerable amounts of debris downstream. In mid-September a large amount of driftwood became entangled in the scaffolding of the new bridge construction. About 40 workers then attempted to clear the debris through the relatively narrow openings, but this had to be abandoned due to poor visibility during the night of 22 and 23 September. Eventually, the accumulated debris broke free, carrying a section of the scaffolding with it, struck the wooden bridge, and became trapped there. On 23 September morning the responsible engineer ordered a test run with a locomotive to prove bridge statics and after its successful crossing he ordered to opened the bridge to traffic at slow speeds, which initially occurred without any apparent cause for concern.

Around 2 PM a mixed passenger-freight train, consisted of a locomotive engine, its tender, and six freight cars, left Osijek station in north direction. The two of those transported troopers of the 15th Nyíregyháza Hussar Regiment coming back to Hungary from their deployment in occupied Bosnia and Herzegovina. At approximately 2:10 PM started to cross the bridge, as the fifth train of the day. On its further part the bridge piers couldn't withstand the pressure of driftwood and the scouring of a moving train set causing the sixth arch collapse, dragging the engine, tender, two freight and two troops wagons into the water below.

== Aftermath ==
Wreck of the railway bridge in Osijek (by photographer Georg Knittel from Osijek, September 1882)

26 passengers were killed during the train fall, all the Hungarian hussars who had been in the first of the two transport cars, about 20 more were injured. Two construction workers died being present on the bridge in the fatal moment. The other troopers and the train staff were able to swim to the bank.

Investigation of the event started the very next day and was however closed in 1886, when the engineer responsible for bridge re-opening for traffic was convinced of his professional failure and sentenced to one year in prison.

A stone obelisk memorial of the victims was erected next to the Osijek station.

== See also ==
- Osijek
- Rail transport in Croatia
- List of rail accidents (1880–1889)

== Biography ==
- Horváth, Ferenc (1995). Hazai és külföldi vasúti balesetek (in Hungarian). Budapest: Közlekedési Dokumentációs Rt. ISBN 963-7085-29-7.
