= 1887 Hartford Railroad Disaster =

Train derailment in West Hartford, Vermont

Hartford Railroad Disaster
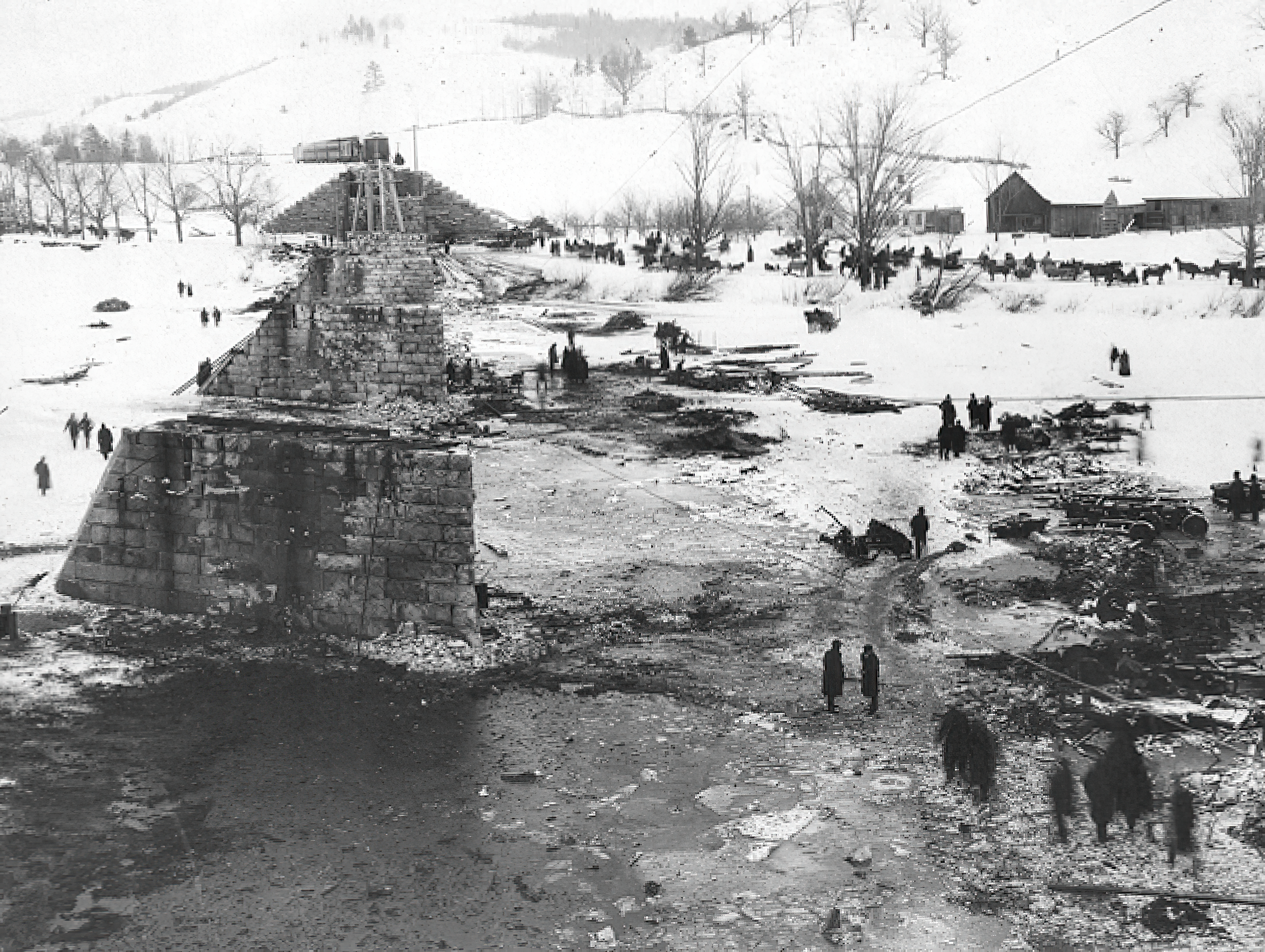
- View of the accident site from the south.

- Location of the derailment

Details
- Date: February 5, 1887; 2:10 a.m. EST (UTC−5)
- Location: West Hartford, Vermont
- Coordinates: 43°40′54″N 72°23′38″W
- Country: United States
- Line: Montreal Express
- Operator: Vermont Central Railroad
- Incident type: Derailment
- Cause: Broken rail

Statistics
- Trains: 1
- Passengers: 100 (estimated)
- Deaths: 37 confirmed; possibly up to 60
- Injured: Dozens (exact number unknown)

The 1887 Hartford Railroad Disaster, also known as the West Hartford Bridge Disaster, occurred on February 5, 1887, near Hartford, Vermont. It remains the deadliest train accident in Vermont's history, resulting in the deaths of approximately 37 individuals and injuring around 50 others.

== Background ==
The Vermont Central Railroad operated the Montreal Express, which consisted of one baggage and express car combined, one mail and smoker car combined, two ordinary passenger cars, and two Pullman sleeping cars—the "Pilgrim" and the "St. Albans.”

The train was estimated to be carrying between 85 and 90 passengers on the night of the accident. Many were en route to a circus in Montreal, and the train had already fallen behind schedule, prompting the engineer to drive at higher speeds to make up for lost time. The weather that night was severe, with temperatures plummeting to −18 °F (−28 °C).

== Incident ==
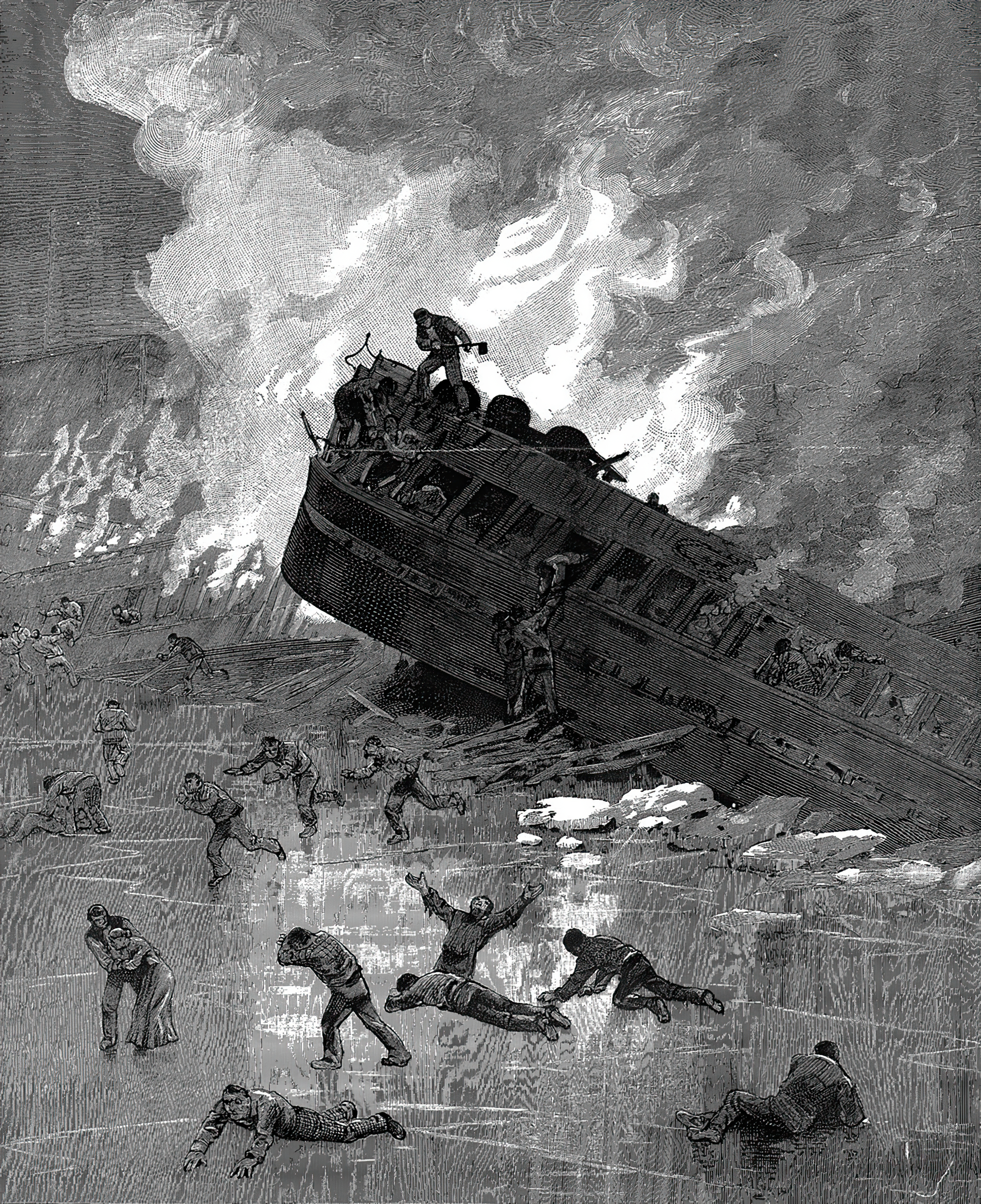
Illustration of the disaster in Frank Leslie's Illustrated Newspaper.

At approximately 2:10 a.m., as the train approached the West Hartford Bridge, a catastrophic failure occurred. The engine, along with the combined baggage, express, mail, and smoking cars, successfully passed over the bridge. However, the two sleepers and two passenger cars derailed. Upon reaching the bridge, they broke away from the forward portion of the train and plunged approximately 40 feet onto the ice-covered White River. Many passengers were trapped inside as the wooden cars ignited from overturned coal-burning stoves and oil lamps. The bridge was also set ablaze by the burning cars.

== Rescue efforts ==
Charles H. Pierce, the train's engineer, and Frank Thresher, the fireman, were among the first to reach the wreckage. They, along with other railroad employees and passengers from the undamaged cars, immediately began rescue efforts. They broke windows, removed debris, and helped pull survivors from the burning wreckage.

Local residents and emergency crews also arrived to assist survivors. However, extreme cold hampered efforts; many victims suffered from frostbite or hypothermia before help could reach them. Nearby homes were converted into makeshift hospitals for the injured.

Despite these efforts, only a few bodies could be recovered from the wreckage due to the severity of injuries and conditions on-site. Many victims were burned beyond recognition, making identification extremely difficult.

== Casualties and aftermath ==
Initial estimates of casualties varied widely, but it is generally accepted that around 37 people died, with some reports suggesting that as many as 50 to 60 lives were lost due to injuries or subsequent fires.

== Investigation ==
On February 7, 1887, two days after the accident, the Vermont Railway Commission opened an investigation. The investigation was led by Lieutenant Governor Levi K. Fuller and included the former governor of Vermont, Samuel Pingree. The inquiry focused on the condition of the rails, as evidence suggested that a fractured rail caused the derailment.

Professor Robert Fletcher, the head of the engineering department of Dartmouth College, conducted an examination of the track leading to the bridge. He found that three rails showed visible signs of defects in material and construction. He theorized that an axle on the "Pilgrim" car broke, causing its derailment, and that it was the only car to leave the track until the bridge was reached.

However, J.W. Hobart, the General Manager of the Central Vermont Railroad, stated that the rails were manufactured in England by John Brown and had been in constant use for 16 years without exhibiting defects. He added that rails of the same manufacture had been in use at St. Albans for 23 years with minimal wear.

The commission ultimately concluded that the defect in the rail could not have been detected prior to the accident.

== Aftermath and impact ==
The Hartford Railroad Disaster prompted significant changes in railroad safety regulations across the United States. Investigations revealed deficiencies in both train maintenance and operational protocols. As a direct result of this disaster, railroads began phasing out coal and kerosene heating systems in favor of steam heat generated by locomotives. Additionally, new safety legislation was introduced at both state and federal levels aimed at improving railroad safety standards.

The disaster also had significant financial implications for the Central Vermont Railroad. The damage to rolling stock was estimated at $30,000 ($1,075,000 in 2023), and rebuilding the bridge was expected to cost between $20,000 and $30,000.

== Memorials ==
A historical marker near the site of the disaster commemorates the event, providing information about the incident and its impact on railway safety reforms.

== See also ==
- List of American railroad accidents
- List of rail accidents (1880–1889)
