= Deerfield River =

River in Vermont and Massachusetts, United States

An FRTA bus is seen crossing where the Connecticut converges with the Deerfield.

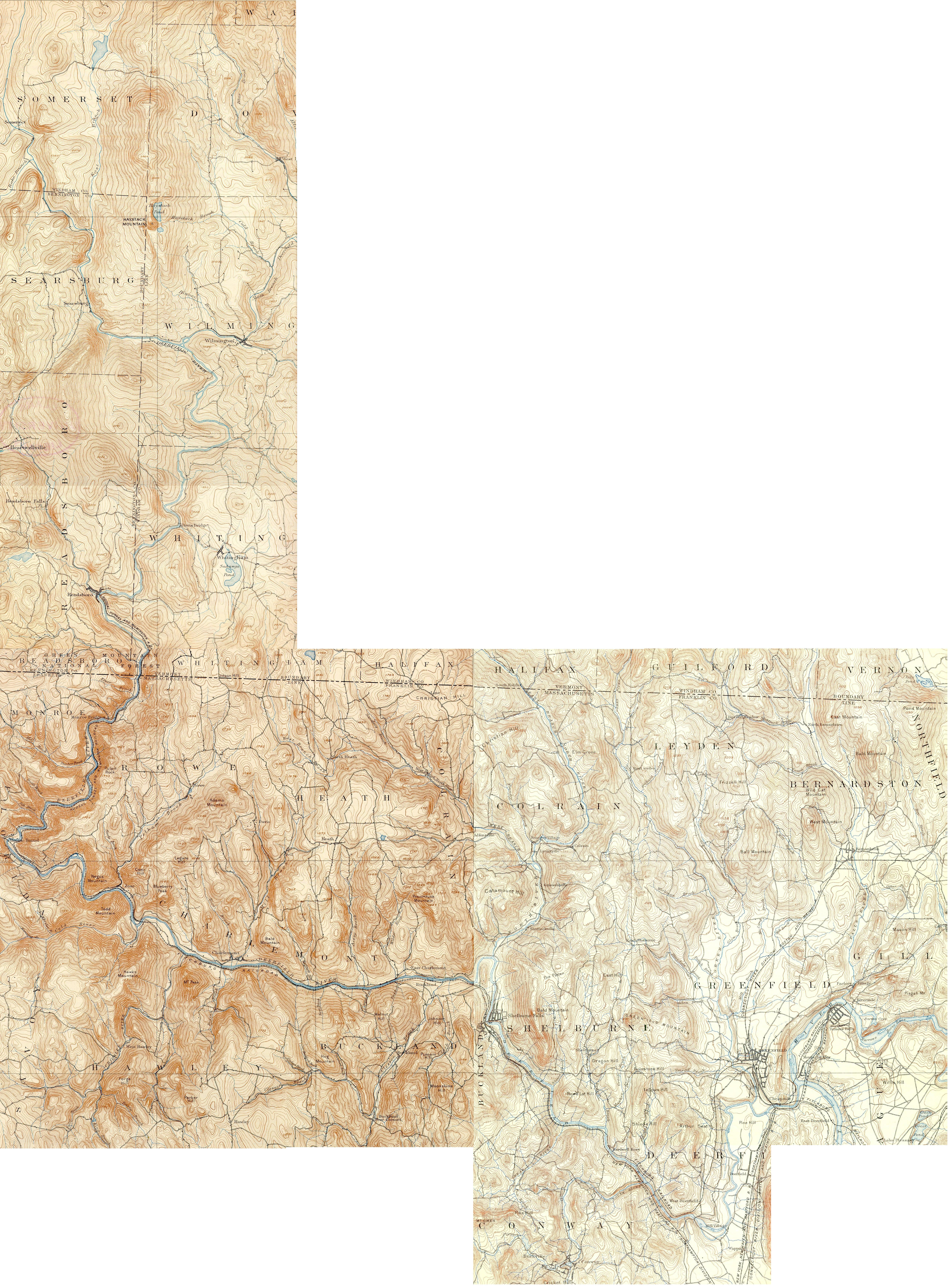
Deerfield River

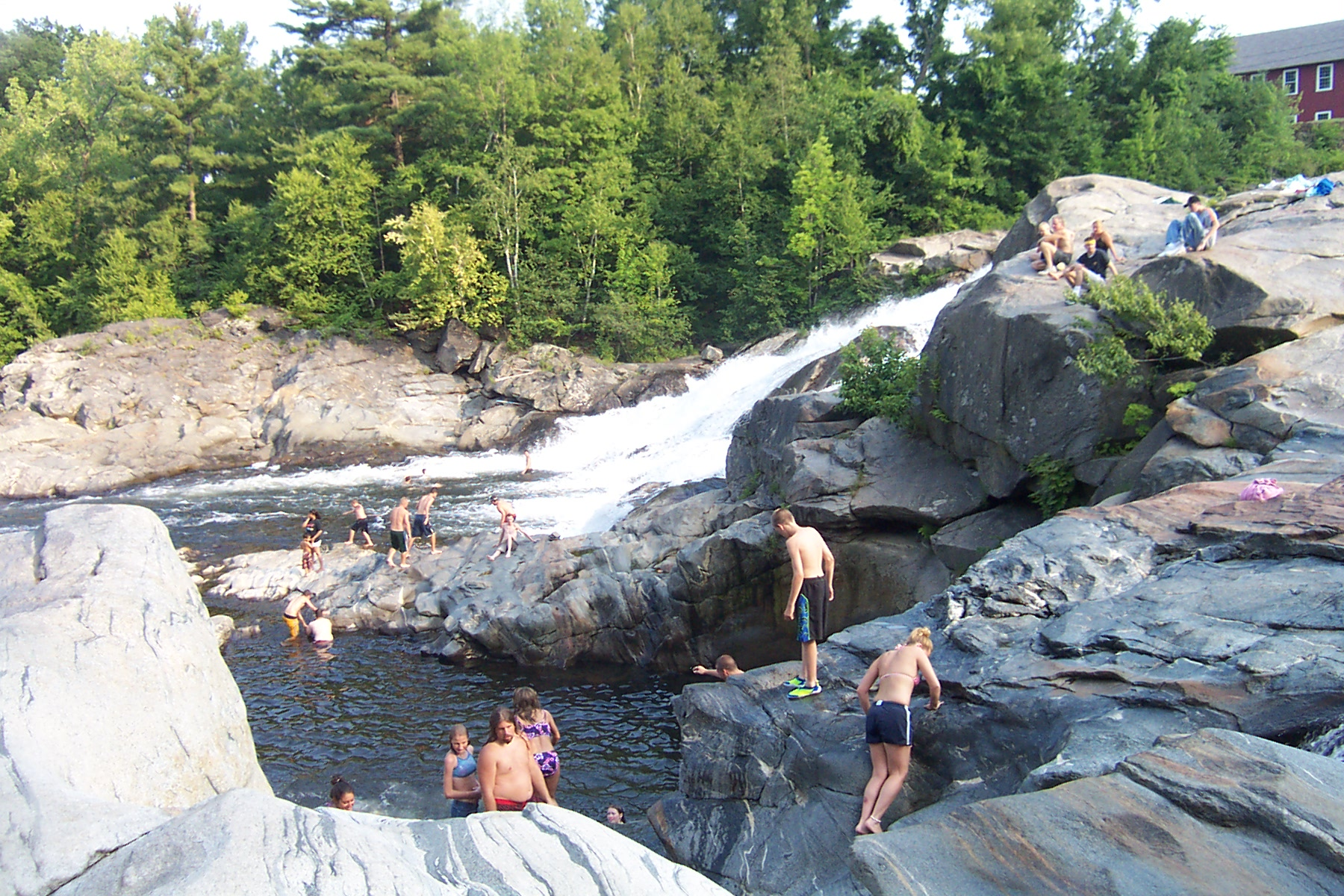
Swimming in the Deerfield River in Shelburne Falls

Deerfield River is a river that runs for 76 miles (122 km) from southern Vermont through northwestern Massachusetts to the Connecticut River. The Deerfield River was historically influential in the settlement of western Franklin County, Massachusetts, and its namesake town.

It is the Connecticut River's second-longest tributary in Massachusetts, 2.1 miles (3.4 km) shorter than the Westfield River. Deerfield River's confluence with the Connecticut is in Greenfield, downstream of Turners Falls. The Deerfield is one of the most heavily dammed rivers in the country, with 10 dams along its course. In Shelburne Falls, glacial potholes and the Bridge of Flowers are popular tourist attractions around the river.

== Geography ==
The great descent of the river of nearly 1,100 feet (340 m) over 50 miles (80 km) furnished water power at multiple places. Several streams nearly as large as the main river enter the Deerfield River from the north. Among its tributaries is the Green River.

== Dams ==
There are 10 dams on the Deerfield, owned by three different electric utilities:

- Great River Hydro LLC purchased from the TransCanada Corporation in 2017 the Somerset, Searsburg, Harriman, Sherman, Deerfield #2, #3, #4 and #5 hydroelectric generating stations and dams;
- Brookfield Power owns the Bear Swamp Pump Storage project and Fife Brook dam;
- Nautilus Power LLC of Charlotte, North Carolina, owns the relatively small Gardner Falls Dam, which dates from 1904.

The various hydroelectric facilities were purchased from National Energy & Gas Transmission, Inc. (NEGT) subsidiary USGen New England, Inc. at the conclusion of NEGT's Chapter 11 bankruptcy and liquidation of the assets of the USGen subsidiary in 2005.

In 1994, an agreement on relicensing the various dams with the Federal Energy Regulatory Commission (FERC) and the Massachusetts and Vermont state authorities that regulate water quality led to comprehensive coordinated water release and power generation schedules to enable more recreational use of the river, with minimum water flow measures to mitigate the dam impact on riverine habitat.

A 260-foot-tall (79 m) dam was proposed for the Stillwater section of the river in Deerfield in the mid to late 20th century. Local opposition helped to defeat the proposal.

Name	Capacity (MW)	In service	Notes
Searsburg Station	5	1922	
Harriman Station	39	1925	
Sherman Station	7	1927	
Deerfield #5	14	1974	
Former Deerfield #5 powerhouse			Discontinued, located underwater in lower Bear Swamp reservoir, relocated to position above
Bear Swamp Generating Station	600	1974	Upper reservoir pumped from 770' to 1600', released in high demand periods.
Fife Brook Station	10	1974	
Deerfield #4	6	1913	Charlemont-Buckland border
Deerfield #3	7	1912	Shelburne Falls
Gardners Falls	3.5	1904	
Deerfield #2	6	1913	

== History ==
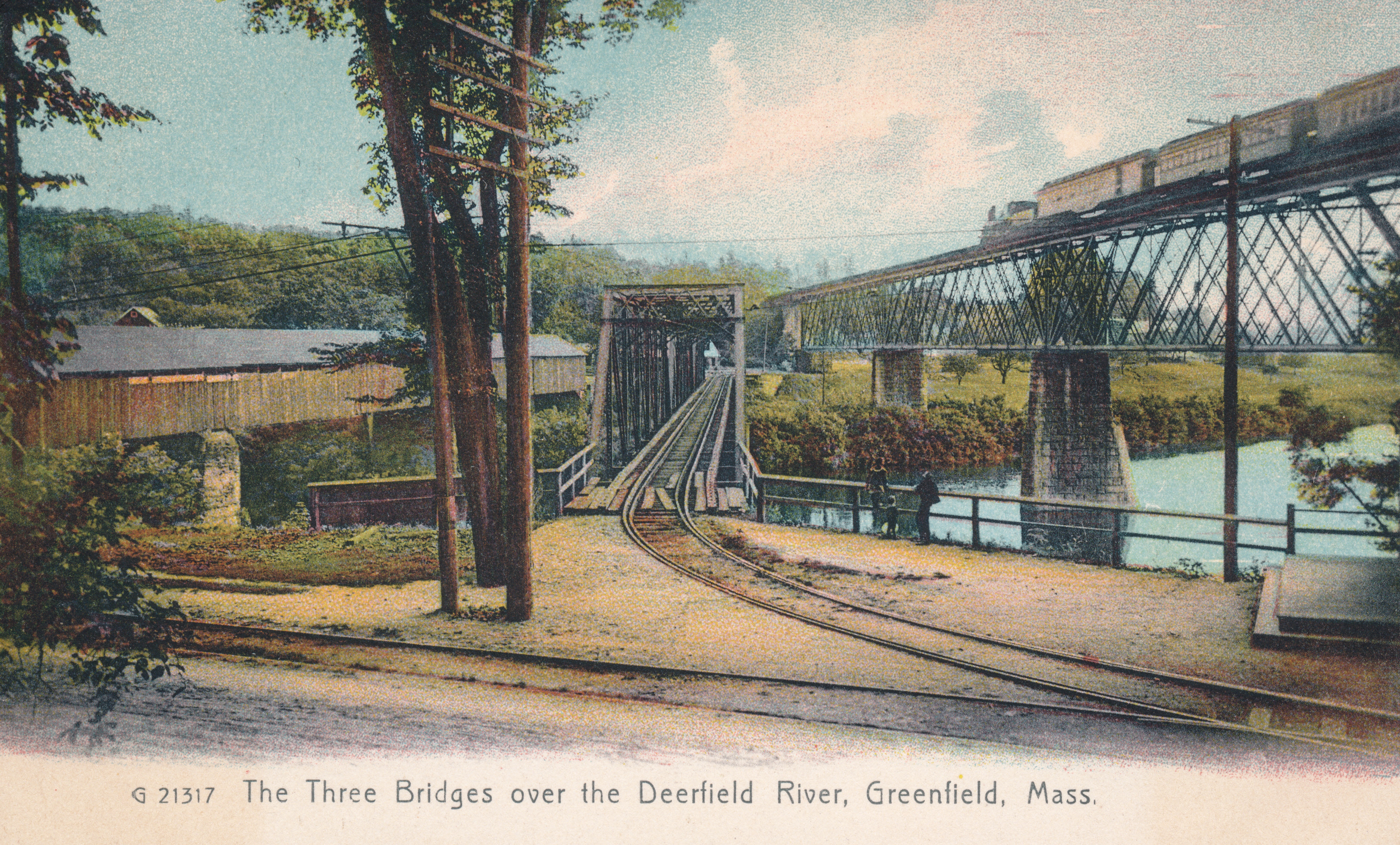
Early bridges over the Deerfield River in Greenfield, Massachusetts, circa 1915

The hydroelectric development of the Deerfield River began in 1910 when the New England Power Company was formed to acquire water rights on the Deerfield and construct dams. The largest dam, Harriman, was built in the early 1920s and has an unusual overflow structure known as the "Glory Hole." This structure is a funnel-like concrete tube that leads to a tunnel under the earthen dam and prevents high flows from overtopping the dam.

The last dam built on the Deerfield was Fife Brook Dam, which was built in the early 1970s in conjunction with the development of the Bear Swamp Pumped Storage facility. This facility acts as a battery for power generated during times of low demand. By using excess electricity to pump water to the top of the mountain, where a reservoir was created by building levees around an existing high swamp, energy is stored. When electrical demand is higher (usually midday or afternoon/evening) the water from the upper reservoir can be released through the turbines (which act as pumps in reverse) to meet demand.

The third commercial nuclear reactor in the United States was built in the town of Rowe, Massachusetts, on the banks of the Deerfield River by Sherman Reservoir. Known as "Yankee Rowe", it generated electricity for New England from 1960 to 1992.

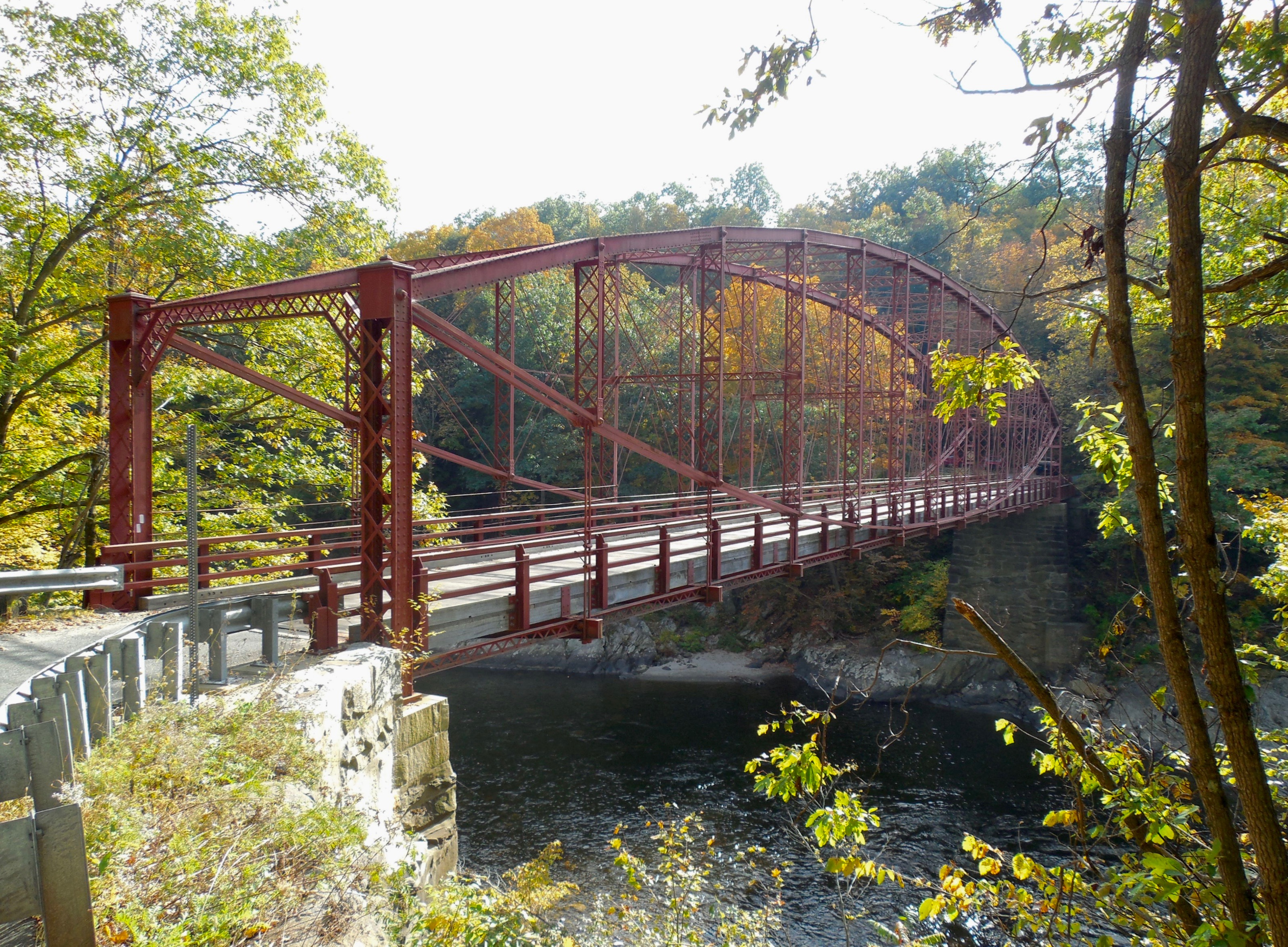
Historic Bardwell's Ferry Bridge over the Deerfield River

The eastern entrance of the Hoosac Tunnel is located on the river in the town of Florida, Massachusetts. It is a railroad tunnel, still in use, started in 1851 and completed in 1875. The Burleigh Rock Drill, one of the first pneumatic drills, was used in its construction. Construction also featured the first large-scale commercial use of nitroglycerine and electric blasting caps. The American Society of Civil Engineers made the tunnel a Historic Civil Engineering Landmark in 1975.

The Bardwell's Ferry Bridge is a 198-foot-long (60 m) pin-connected through truss, built in 1882 and spanning the Deerfield River between the towns of Shelburne and Conway in Franklin County. It is the longest single-span lenticular bridge in Massachusetts. It has been listed on the National Register of Historic Places.

== Recreation ==
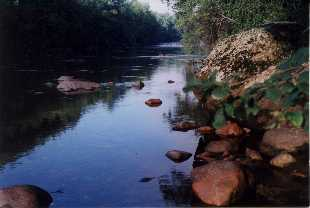
Deerfield River in Charlemont, Massachusetts

Activities on and around the Deerfield include whitewater kayaking, canoeing, tubing, fishing, swimming, and camping. A popular swimming area by the Stillwater Bridge in Deerfield has waterside cliffs up to 40 feet (12 m) high that swimmers jump from; this activity is tolerated but not condoned. There are two sections of the river for whitewater paddling: the Fife Brook section for class II and III paddlers, and the "Dryway" for class IV paddlers.

There are several tributaries of the Deerfield River that provide whitewater brook runs, including the class IV-V West Branch of the Deerfield in Readsboro, Vermont, the class V Dunbar Brook in Monroe, Massachusetts, the class V Pelham Brook in Rowe, Massachusetts, the class IV Cold River in Florida and Charlemont, Massachusetts, and the class III Chickley River in Hawley, Massachusetts.

Two sections between the Fife Brook dam and the Route 2 bridge are catch and release. There are five dams that control the majority of the river flow and allow selectable trout fishing through the year.

== See also ==
- Deerfield railway accident
- Pioneer Valley
- List of old growth forests in Massachusetts
- List of rivers of Vermont
