= Bardwell's Ferry Bridge =

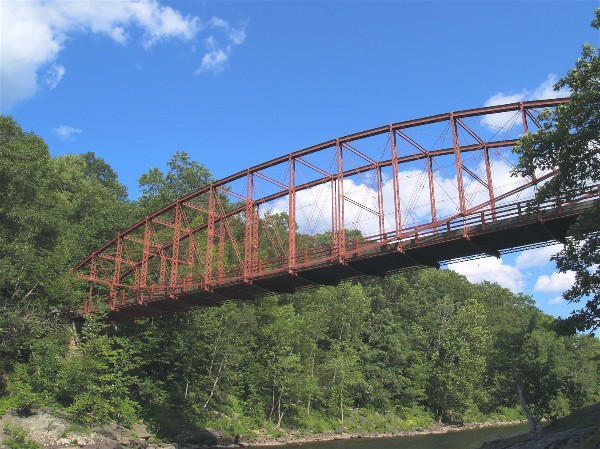
- Historic Bardwell's Ferry Bridge over the Deerfield River
- Coordinates: 42°33′20″N 72°40′41″W
- Carries: Bardwell's Ferry Road
- Crosses: Deerfield River
- Locale: Conway, Massachusetts

Characteristics
- Design: Truss bridge
- Total length: 198 ft (60 m)
- Width: 14 ft (4.3 m)

History
- Designer: Douglas, William O.; Berlin Iron Bridge Co.
- Construction end: 1880
- Bardwell's Ferry Bridge
- U.S. National Register of Historic Places
- Nearest city: Conway, Massachusetts
- Built: 1882
- Architect: William O. Douglas, Berlin Iron Bridge Co.
- NRHP reference No.: 00000076
- Added to NRHP: February 10, 2000

Location
- Interactive map of Bardwell's Ferry Bridge

The Bardwell's Ferry Bridge, built in 1882, is a historic lenticular truss bridge spanning the Deerfield River between the towns of Shelburne and Conway in Franklin County, Massachusetts. The bridge is listed on the National Register of Historic Places and is designated as a Massachusetts Historic Civil Engineering Landmark by the American Society of Civil Engineers.

== Description ==
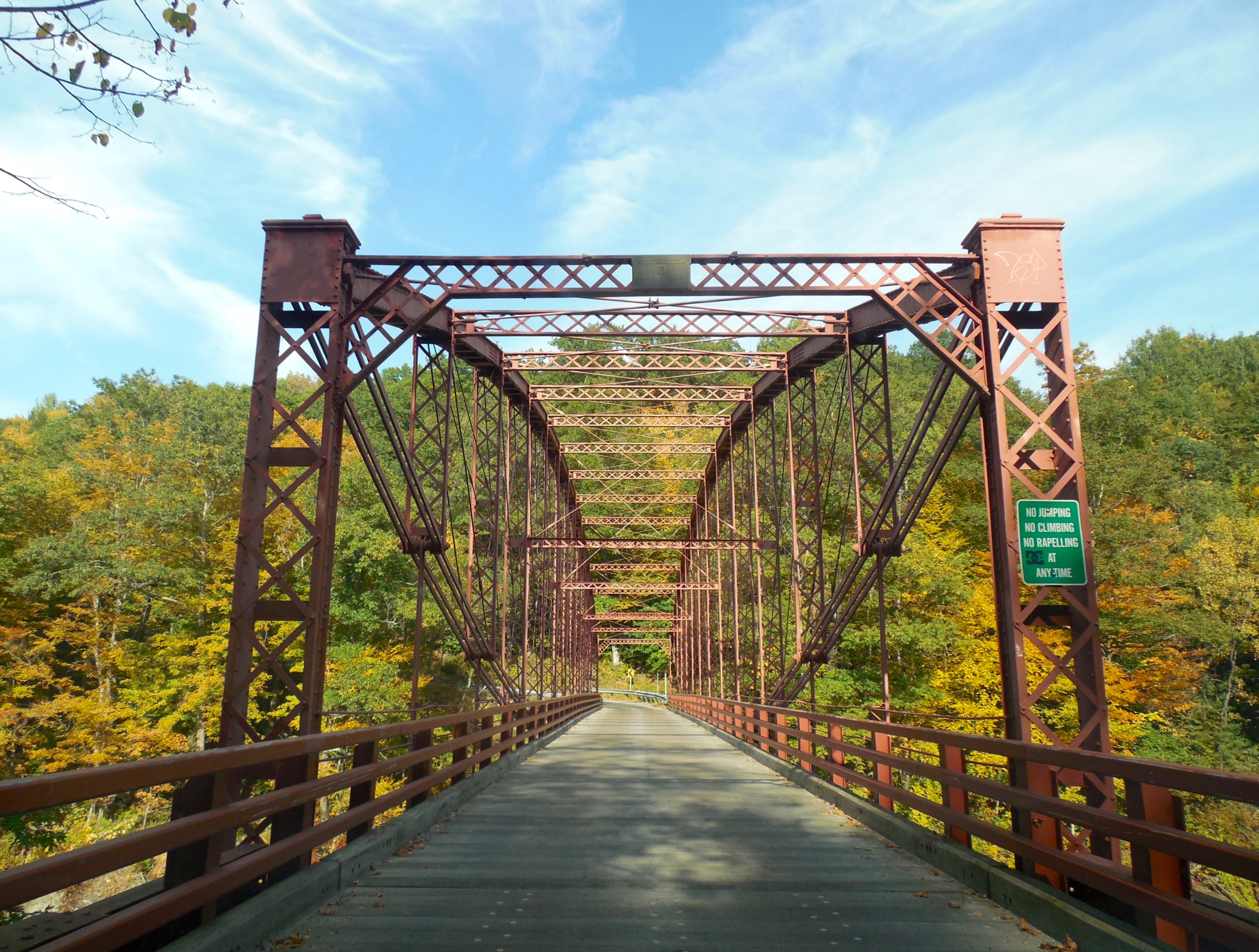
View from road, at bridge's west end

The Bardwell's Ferry Bridge carries Bardwell's Ferry Road across the Deerfield River. The bridge is situated within a deep valley, with sharply sloping roadways on each side.

Built by the Berlin Iron Bridge Co. of East Berlin, Connecticut, the bridge is 198 feet (60 m) long, consisting of 13 panels. It is the longest single span lenticular bridge in Massachusetts.

The end posts and upper chords are built-up open box members, consisting riveted plates and angles giving dimensions of 18 by 12 inches (46 cm × 30 cm). The lower chords are constructed from 1-by-3-inch (3 cm × 8 cm) eye bars. The bridge deck is 14 feet (4.3 m) wide and is constructed of wooden planks.

During the latter part of the 19th century, the Berlin Iron Bridge Co. manufactured and erected almost 800 lenticular truss bridges in the United States (Darnell 1979). While most of these bridges were built in New England, a few were constructed in Ohio and Texas. These bridges are sometimes referred to as "pumpkin-seed bridges", "cats-eyes bridges", "elliptical truss bridges", or "parabolic truss bridges" because of their unique lens shape. Lenticular bridges were only used for vehicular traffic and were generally considered too light to be used for railroad and trolley loads.

On August 24, 2023 the bridge was closed by Massachusetts Department of Transportation (MassDOT) because it was structurally deficient and unsafe to travel on. No date for reopening was given by MassDOT.

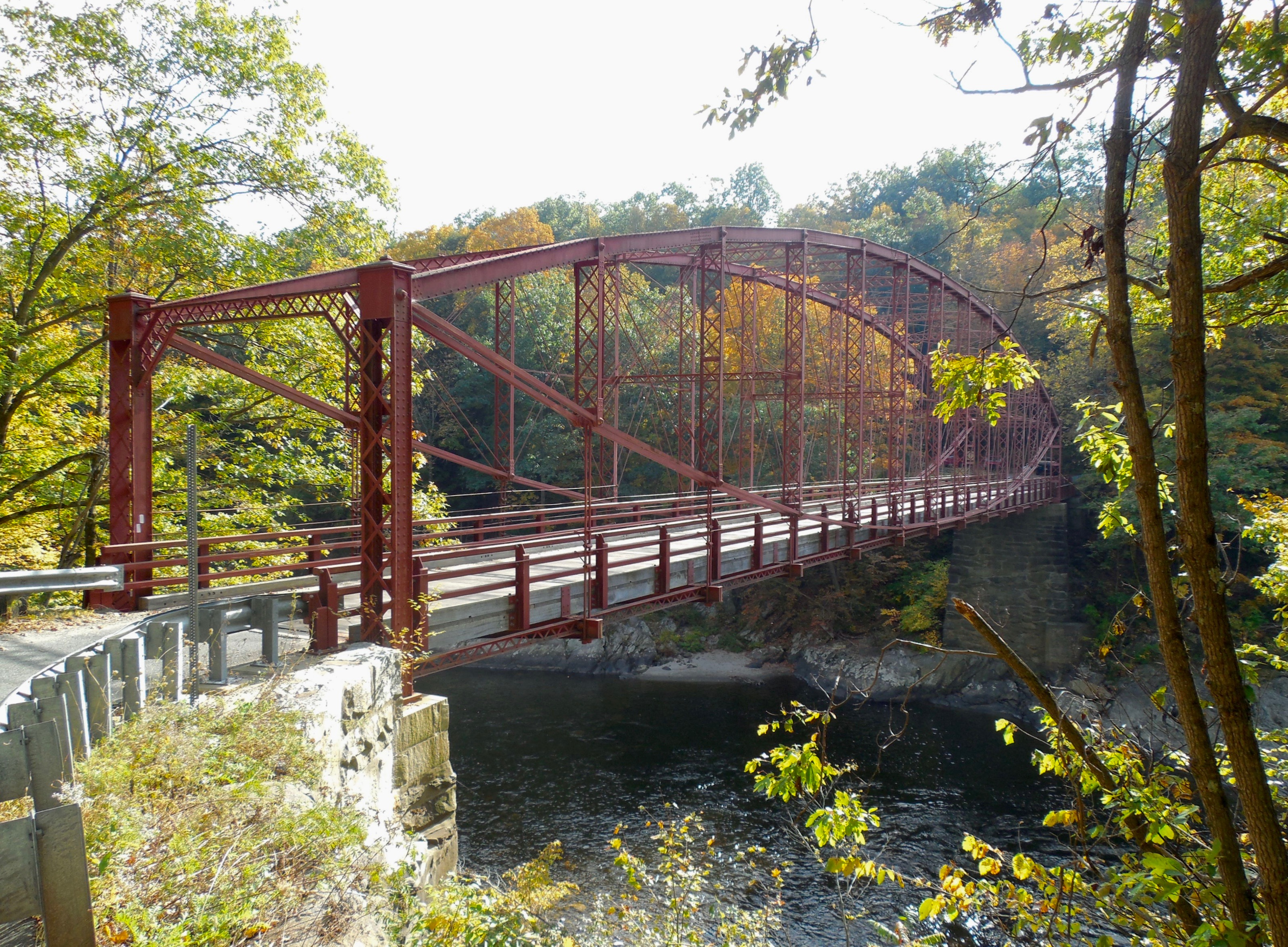
Full view of bridge from the north in 2014

The Bardwell's Ferry Bridge was restored in the 1990s, and added to the National Register of Historic Places in 2000.

== See also ==
- List of bridges documented by the Historic American Engineering Record in Massachusetts
