= Morelos railway accident =

1881 railway incident in Mexico

Details
- Date: 23 June 1881; 11:00 pm
- Location: outside Cuautla, Morelos
- Country: Mexico
- Line: Morelos Railroad
- Cause: Bridge collapse

Statistics
- Trains: 1
- Deaths: over 200
- Injured: about 40

The Morelos railway accident occurred on 23 June 1881 (Note: Different sources give different dates: The 26 June and 28 June NY Times articles say 24 June. Railroad Wrecks says 22 June. The Mail says 23 June.) near Cuautla, Morelos in Mexico when an entire train plunged into the San Antonio river, killing over 200 people.

On 18 June 1881, the narrow gauge Morelos Railroad from Mexico City to Cuautla first opened to the public. To honor the occasion, the President of Mexico and other high government officials visited Cuautla, accompanied by about 300 soldiers. Approximately 100 of the soldiers returned to Mexico City on 20 June, with the remainder set to leave on 23 June.

The 23 June train consisted of:

- Two locomotives (one forward, one rear)
- A passenger car for the Army officers
- Five wooden boxcars for the soldiers and their wives
- Two wooden boxcars carrying freight, including 80-100 barrels of brandy (reports differ on the number)

There had been heavy rains in the area, and in the dark, the engineer was unable to see that the bridge was now unsupported. When the train started over the bridge it immediately dropped into the ravine. On the way down, burning coals from the rear locomotive set the barrels of alcohol aflame. Between the fall and the fire, few survived.

An investigation was begun, and on 30 June, it was declared that "the actual and sole cause of the disaster was the very bad construction of the bridge." However, a report published on 14 July 1881 by The Toronto Mail set the blame squarely on the battalion's commanding officer, stating that he had forced the engineer at gunpoint to cross the bridge.

== See also ==
- Lists of rail accidents
