= Charlotte Township, Livingston County, Illinois =

Coordinates: 40°47′51″N 88°17′35″W

Charlotte Township
- Township
- Location in Livingston County

- Livingston County's location in Illinois
- Country: United States
- State: Illinois
- County: Livingston
- Established: 1865

Area
  - Total: 30.13 sq mi (78.0 km^{2})
  - Land: 30.09 sq mi (77.9 km^{2})
  - Water: 0.04 sq mi (0.10 km^{2}) 0.13%

Population (2020)
  - Total: 164
  - Density: 5.45/sq mi (2.10/km^{2})
- Time zone: UTC-6 (CST)
  - Summer (DST): UTC-5 (CDT)
- FIPS code: 17-105-12606

Charlotte Township is located in Livingston County, Illinois. As of the 2020 census, its population was 164 and it contained 65 housing units.

== History ==
Charlotte Township was created from Saunemin Township in 1865.

== Geography ==
According to the 2021 census gazetteer files, Charlotte Township has a total area of 30.13 square miles (78.04 km^{2}), of which 30.09 square miles (77.93 km^{2}) (or 99.87%) is land and 0.04 square miles (0.10 km^{2}) (or 0.13%) is water.

== Demographics ==
As of the 2020 census there were 164 people, 48 households, and 48 families residing in the township. The population density was 5.44 inhabitants per square mile (2.10/km^{2}). There were 65 housing units at an average density of 2.16 per square mile (0.83/km^{2}). The racial makeup of the township was 93.90% White, 1.22% African American, 0.61% Native American, 0.61% Asian, 0.00% Pacific Islander, 0.00% from other races, and 3.66% from two or more races. Hispanic or Latino of any race were 1.83% of the population.

There were 48 households, out of which 29.20% had children under the age of 18 living with them, 100.00% were married couples living together. The average household size was 2.38 and the average family size was 2.38.

The township's age distribution consisted of 10.5% under the age of 18, 6.1% from 18 to 24, 20.2% from 25 to 44, 24.6% from 45 to 64, and 38.6% who were 65 years of age or older. The median age was 53.8 years. For every 100 females, there were 115.1 males. For every 100 females age 18 and over, there were 121.7 males.

The median income for a household in the township was $103,125, and the median income for a family was $103,125. Males had a median income of $112,625 versus $31,023 for females. The per capita income for the township was $51,955. None of the population was below the poverty line.

Historical population
Census	Pop.	Note	%±
2010	136		—
2020	164		20.6%
U.S. Decennial Census
