= Green River (Deerfield River tributary) =

River in the U.S. states of Vermont and Massachusetts

Coordinates: 42.5721°N 72.6027°W

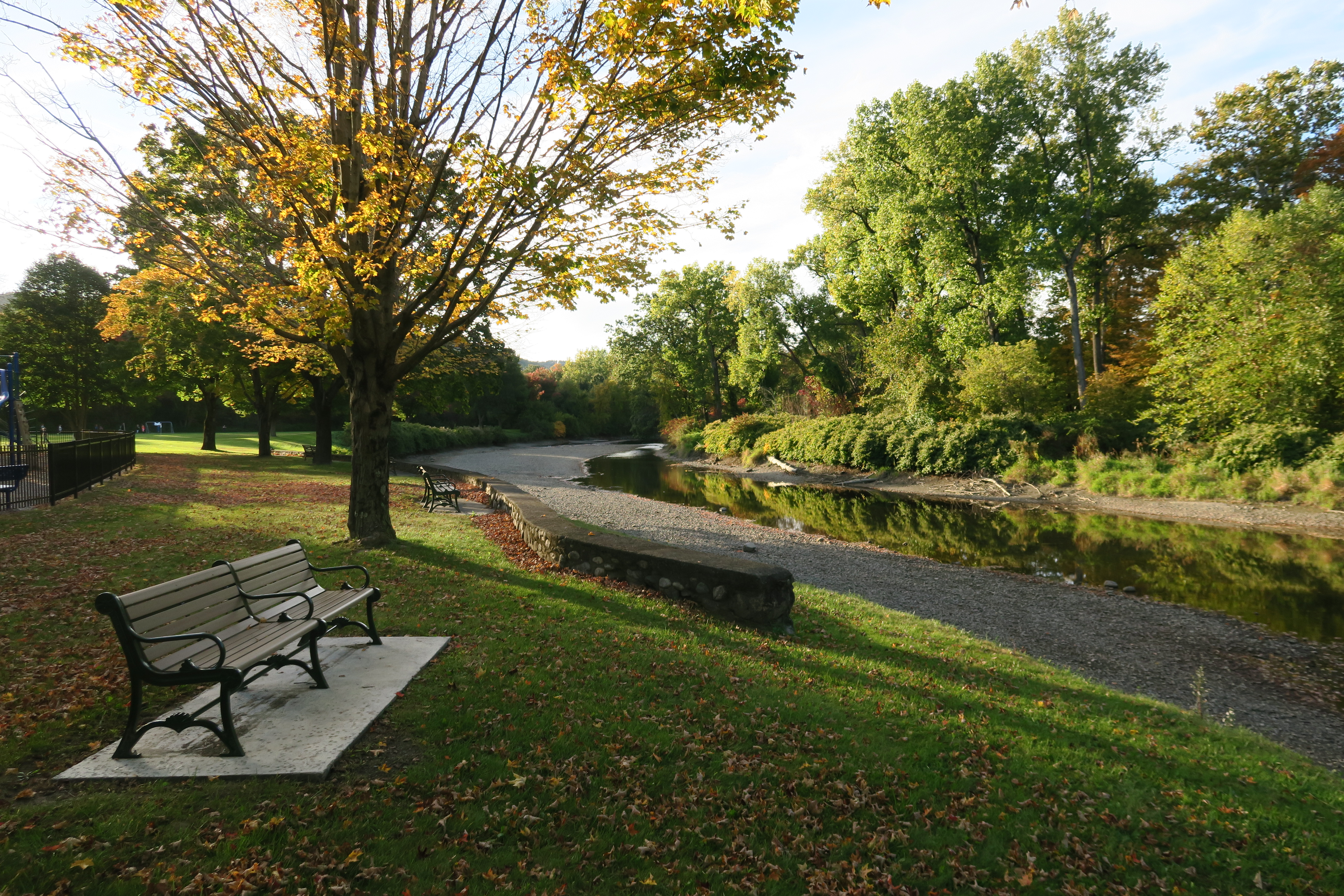
The Green River at the Green River Park

The Green River is a tributary river to the Deerfield River in the United States states of Vermont and Massachusetts. It has a catchment area of roughly 230.5 square kilometres (89.0 mi^{2}), and is 45 kilometres (28 mi) long. The largest town on the Green River is Greenfield, Massachusetts.

== See also ==
- List of rivers of Vermont
