= 1887 Great Chatsworth train wreck =

1887 railroad accident in Illinois

Great Chatsworth train wreck
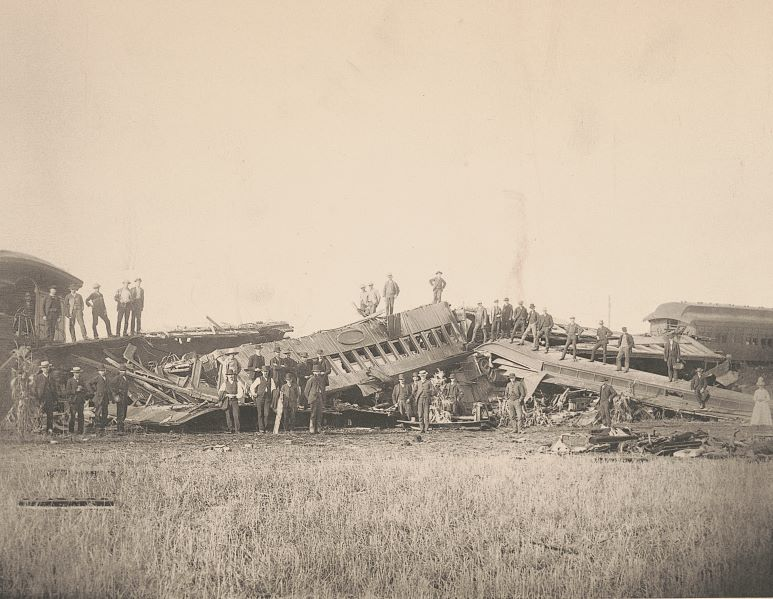
- Wreck on the day after

Details
- Date: August 10, 1887; Approximately 11:55 p.m.
- Location: Chatsworth Township, Livingston County, between Chatsworth and Piper City, Illinois, USA
- Coordinates: 40°45′18″N 88°15′28″W
- Country: United States
- Operator: Toledo, Peoria and Western Railroad
- Incident type: Derailment
- Cause: Bridge collapse

Statistics
- Trains: 1
- Deaths: 81 or 85

The Great Chatsworth train wreck was a major rail accident that occurred late on the night of August 10, 1887, 3 miles (5 km) east of Chatsworth, Illinois, in the United States. A Toledo, Peoria and Western Railroad (TP&W) train bound for Niagara Falls crossed over a trestle, weakened earlier in the day by a fire, causing it to collapse. In 2007, staff of the McLean County Museum of History wrote that "the Chatsworth Train Wreck probably ranks as the second- or third-deadliest U.S rail accident in the 19th century."

== Crash ==
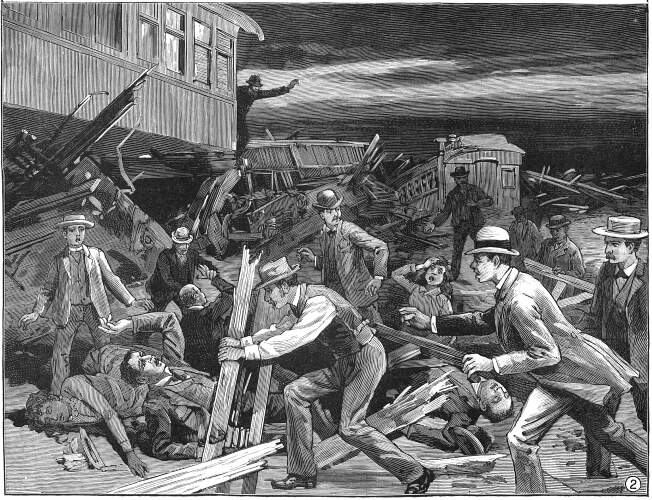
A Harper's Weekly impression of the accident

The summer of 1887 had been hot and dry. Fearing that sparks from the steam engines of the trains could ignite brush fires, the TP&W company began performing controlled burns to prevent an uncontrollable brush fire. On the day of the accident, TP&W crews performed a controlled burn near the site of the accident—it is suspected that failure to extinguish the fire resulted in charring of the bridge.

That day, a TP&W train carried vacationers taking advantage of a special offer to visit Niagara Falls. It had picked up passengers all along the TP&W line as far back as Iowa, and left Peoria, Illinois around 8 p.m.: Two steam engines pulled six fully loaded wooden passenger cars, six sleeper cars, and three luggage cars. It travelled east through Eureka and Chenoa, and did not stop at Chatsworth. Just before the accident site, the coach accelerated down a slope, reaching 40 miles per hour (64 km/h). The first engine successfully crossed the weakened bridge as it collapsed; the second engine crashed into the side of the hill, while each following passenger car telescoped into the next. Sleeper cars attached to the rear of the train halted just short of the bridge.

The disaster immediately made national news, including almost half of the front page of The New York Times.

Four days later, the TP&W gathered together the remaining wreckage and set it on fire. The crash resulted in the increased use of steel in passenger cars.

== Historical marker ==
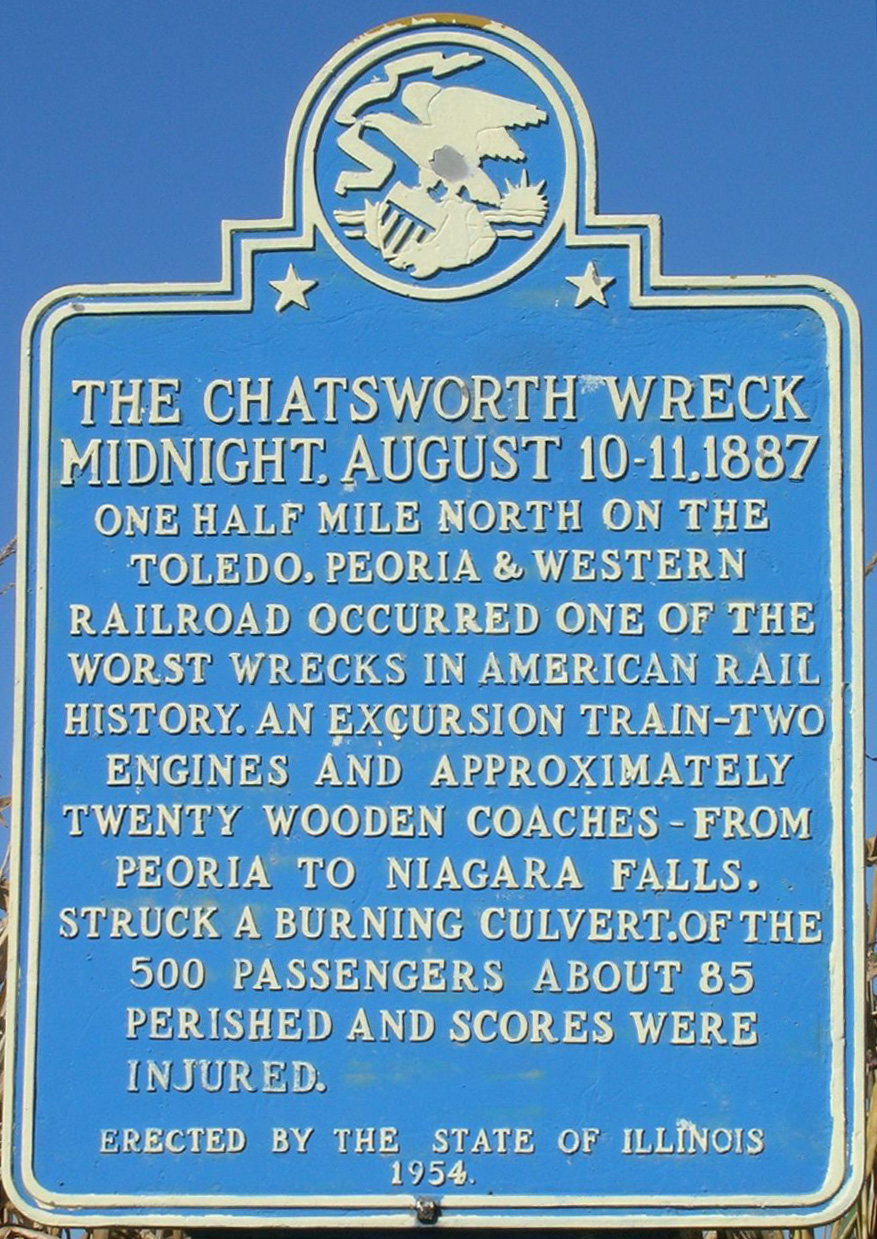
Historical marker erected by the state of Illinois in 1954 to commemorate the Chatsworth wreck.

In 1954, the state of Illinois placed a historical marker, along U.S. Route 24, commemorating the event. The marker has the following text:

The Chatsworth Wreck - Midnight, August 10–11, 1887 - One half mile north on the Toledo, Peoria & Western Railroad occurred one of the worst wrecks in American rail history. An excursion train - two engines and approximately twenty wooden coaches - from Peoria to Niagara Falls, struck a burning culvert. Of the 500 passengers about 85 perished and scores were injured.

— Erected by the state of Illinois, 1954.
