= List of places named for the Marquis de Lafayette =

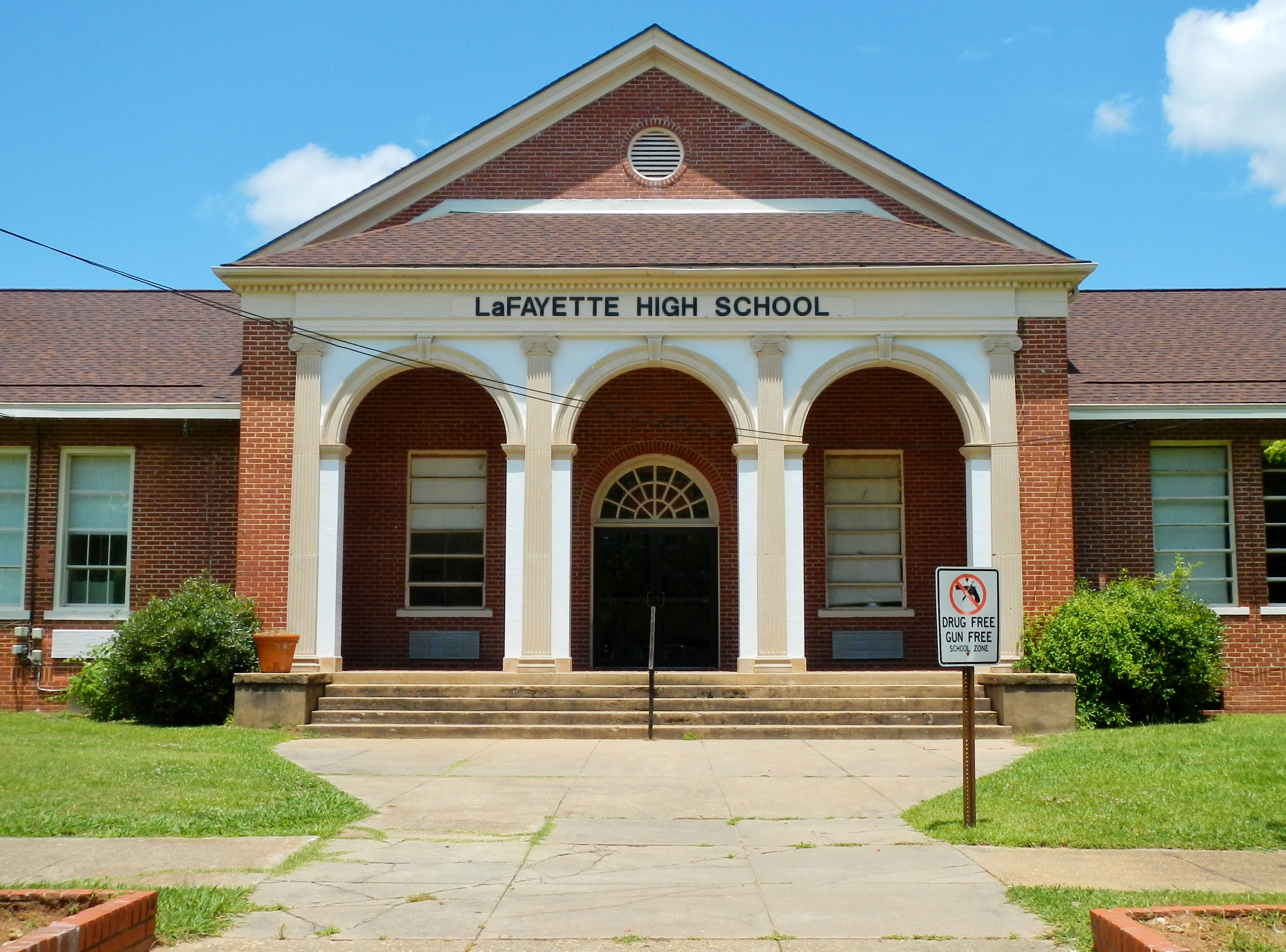
Lafayette High School, in LaFayette, Alabama

This is a list of places named for Gilbert du Motier, Marquis de Lafayette, a French General in the American Revolutionary War. Many of these places were named for him during his 1824–1825 visit to the United States.

== Counties ==
- Fayette County, Alabama
- Lafayette County, Arkansas
- Lafayette County, Florida
- Fayette County, Georgia
- Fayette County, Illinois
- Fayette County, Indiana
- Fayette County, Iowa
- Fayette County, Kentucky
- Lafayette Parish, Louisiana
- Lafayette County, Mississippi
- Lafayette County, Missouri
- Fayette County, Ohio
- Fayette County, Pennsylvania
- Fayette County, Tennessee
- Fayette County, Texas
- Fayette County, West Virginia
- Lafayette County, Wisconsin

== Cities, towns, and villages ==
- Fayette, Alabama
- Fayetteville, Alabama
- LaFayette, Alabama
- Fayetteville, Arkansas is named indirectly; the city is named after Fayetteville, TN, which in turn is named after Fayetteville, NC. Has the largest metropolitan population.
- Fayette Township, Calhoun County, Arkansas
- Lafayette Township, Lonoke County, Arkansas
- Lafayette Township, Ouachita County, Arkansas
- Lafayette Township, Scott County, Arkansas
- Lafayette, California
- Fayetteville, Georgia, seat of Fayette County
- LaFayette, Georgia
- Fayette Township, Livingston County, Illinois
- Fayetteville, Illinois
- La Fayette, Illinois
- Lafayette Township, Coles County, Illinois
- LaFayette Township, Ogle County, Illinois
- Fayette Township, Vigo County, Indiana
- Lafayette metropolitan area, Indiana
- Lafayette Township, Allen County, Indiana
- Lafayette Township, Floyd County, Indiana
- Lafayette Township, Madison County, Indiana
- Lafayette Township, Owen County, Indiana
- West Lafayette, Indiana, the home of Purdue University and sister city of Lafayette, Indiana
- Fayetteville, Indiana
- Fayetteville, Washington County, Indiana
- Lafayette, Indiana, seat of Tippecanoe County, named after Lafayette during his tour of America.
- Fayette Township, Decatur County, Iowa
- Lafayette Township, Allamakee County, Iowa
- Lafayette Township, Bremer County, Iowa
- Lafayette Township, Keokuk County, Iowa
- Lafayette Township, Story County, Iowa
- Fayette Township, Linn County, Iowa
- Fayette, Iowa
- Lafayette Township, Chautauqua County, Kansas
- LaFayette, Kentucky
- Lafayette, Louisiana
- Lafayette metropolitan area, Louisiana
- Fayette, Maine
- Fayette, Michigan
- Lafayette Township, Michigan
- Fayette Township, Michigan
- Lafayette, Minnesota
- Lafayette Township, Minnesota
- Fayette, Mississippi
- Fayette, Missouri
- Lafayette Township, Clinton County, Missouri
- Lafayette Township, St. Louis County, Missouri
- Fayetteville, Missouri
- Lafayette Township, New Jersey
- Fayette, New York
- Fayetteville, New York
- LaFayette, New York
- Lafayetteville, a hamlet in Milan, New York
- Fayetteville, North Carolina was the first city named after Lafayette, and is the only one he actually visited, arriving in Fayetteville by horse-drawn carriage in 1825 during Lafayette's visit to the United States from July 1824 to September 1825 celebrating the 50th anniversary of the Battle of Bunker Hill. Has the greatest city population.
- Fayette, Ohio
- Fayetteville, Ohio
- Fayette Township, Lawrence County, Ohio
- Lafayette Township, Coshocton County, Ohio
- Lafayette Township, Medina County, Ohio
- West Lafayette, Ohio
- Lafayette, Oregon
- Fayette City, Pennsylvania
- Fayette Township, Pennsylvania
- Fayetteville, Pennsylvania
- Lafayette Township, Pennsylvania
- North Fayette Township, Pennsylvania
- South Fayette Township, Pennsylvania
- Fayetteville, Tennessee is named indirectly; the city is named after Fayetteville, North Carolina.
- Lafayette, Tennessee
- Fayetteville, Texas
- Fayette, Utah is named indirectly; the city is named after Fayette, New York.
- Fayette, West Virginia
- Fayetteville, West Virginia
- Fayette, Wisconsin, a town
  - Fayette (community), Wisconsin, an unincorporated community
- Aix-la-Fayette, a commune in the Puy-de-Dôme department in Auvergne in central France
- Chavaniac-Lafayette is a commune in the Haute-Loire department in south-central France

== Squares ==
- Lafayette Square in Buffalo, New York, where he spoke during his nationwide tour in 1825.
- Lafayette Square station, a Buffalo Metro Rail station
- Lafayette Square in Saint Louis, Missouri, neighborhood created in 1833 as one of the city's first public parks and named in his honor in 1854.
- Lafayette Square, Los Angeles, Mid-Wilshire neighborhood of Los Angeles, California
- Lafayette Square in LaGrange, Georgia, where a statue of Lafayette stands atop a fountain
- Lafayette Square, one of 22 historic public squares in Savannah, Georgia
- Lafayette Square (New Orleans), in the Central Business District, New Orleans, Louisiana
- Lafayette Square (Baltimore), Maryland
- Lafayette Square, Cambridge, part of the Central Square area of Cambridge, Massachusetts
  - Lafayette Square Historic District (St. Louis)
- Lafayette Square, Washington, D.C., northernmost part of President's Park
  - Lafayette Square Historic District, Washington, D.C.

== Streets ==
- Avenue de Lafayette in Boston, Massachusetts, located in the Downtown Crossing area
- Fayette Drive in Rotterdam, New York
- Fayette Street in Alexandria, Virginia
- Fayette Street in Conshohocken, Pennsylvania
- Lafayette Avenue in Baltimore, Maryland
- Lafayette Avenue in Cliffside Park, New Jersey
- Lafayette Avenue in Hawthorne, New Jersey
- Lafayette Avenue in Morrisville, Pennsylvania.
- Lafayette Avenue in Omaha, Nebraska
- Lafayette Avenue in Royal Oak, Michigan
- Lafayette Boulevard in Bridgeport, Connecticut
- Lafayette Boulevard in Detroit, Michigan
- Lafayette Boulevard in Phoenix, Arizona
- Lafayette Drive in Oak Ridge, Tennessee
- Lafayette Drive and Lafayette Road in Phoenixville, Pennsylvania, both off of Valley Forge Road located near Valley Forge
- Lafayette Parkway in LaGrange, Georgia
- Lafayette Road in Harrington Park, New Jersey
- Lafayette Road and Fayette Lane in Knoxville, Tennessee
- Lafayette Road in New Hampshire, which extends from the Massachusetts border in Seabrook to Portsmouth
- Lafayette Street in Cape May, New Jersey
- Lafayette Street in Houma, Louisiana
- Lafayette Street in Metamora, Illinois
- Lafayette Street in New Haven, Connecticut
- Lafayette Street in Schenectady, New York
- Lafayette Street in Trenton, New Jersey
- Lafayette Street in Waltham, Massachusetts, located near a critical area during the Revolution
- Lafayette Street in Williston Park, New York
- Lafayette Street in West Chester, Pennsylvania
- Lafayette Street in Florissant, Missouri
- Roads in every New York City Borough
  - Lafayette Avenue in Brooklyn
  - Lafayette Avenue in The Bronx
  - Lafayette Street in Manhattan
  - Lafayette Street in Queens
  - Lafayette Street in Staten Island
- Lafayette Street in Fort Wayne, Indiana
- Route Lafayette in Shanghai, China (Shanghai French Concession) (1914-1943), now renamed Fu Xing Zhong Road
- Rue La Fayette in Paris, one of the longest roads in the city, which crosses the 9th and 10th arrondissements of the city from southwest to northeast
- Cours Lafayette of Lyon in 3rd and 6th arrondissements and Pont Lafayette which crosses the river Rhône
- Ulice Lafayettova in Olomouc, Czech Republic, near the site of Lafayette's imprisonment

== Schools ==
- Lafayette College, in Easton, Pennsylvania
- Lafayette High School (Alabama), in Lafayette, Alabama
- Lafayette High School (Georgia), in Lafayette, Georgia
- Lafayette High School (Florida), in Mayo, Florida
- Lafayette High School, in Lexington, Kentucky
- Lafayette High School, in Lafayette, Louisiana
- Lafayette High School, in St. Joseph, Missouri
- Lafayette High School, in Wildwood, Missouri
- Lafayette High School, in Brooklyn, New York
- Lafayette High School, in Buffalo, New York
- Lafayette High School, near Williamsburg, Virginia
- LaFayette Jr./Sr. High School in LaFayette, New York
- University of Louisiana at Lafayette

== Businesses ==
- Galeries Lafayette, a French department store chain (first store was Rue Lafayette in Paris)
- Lafayette, a French restaurant in New York City which operated from 1965 to the late 1970s
- Lafayette Circus (Theatre), Manhattan, New York City, New York, United States.
- Lafayette Theatre (Suffern), in Suffern, Rockland County, New York, United States
- Lafayette Theatre (Harlem), in Harlem, Manhattan, New York City, New York, United States
- Hotel Lafayette, an historic hotel in Buffalo, New York
- Hotel Lafayette, a hotel and restaurant which operated in New York City
- LaFayette Hotel, an historic hotel in Little Rock, Arkansas
- The Lafayette Hotel, Swim Club & Bungalows, a hotel in San Diego, California
- Lafayette Square Mall, Indianapolis, Indiana

== Other places ==
- Fayetteville Shale
- Lafayette River
- Mount Lafayette in the White Mountains of New Hampshire
- Lafayette Hill, Pennsylvania
- 23244 Lafayette, a main-belt minor planet (aka asteroid)
- Fayette Historic State Park, Michigan
- Fort Lafayette, New York
- Lafayette Apartment Building (Washington, D.C.)
- Lafayette Building (Washington, D.C.)
- Lafayette Building (Detroit)

== See also ==
- Lafayette (disambiguation)
- Lafayette County (disambiguation)
- Lafayette Township (disambiguation)
- Lafayette Hill (disambiguation)
- Lafayette Park (disambiguation)
- Lafayette Square (disambiguation)
- Fayette (disambiguation)
- Fayette County (disambiguation)
- Fayette Township (disambiguation)
- Fayetteville (disambiguation)
