= Lafayette =

Lafayette or La Fayette may refer to:

== People ==
- Lafayette (name), a list of people with the surname Lafayette or La Fayette or the given name Lafayette
- House of La Fayette, a French noble family
  - Marquis de Lafayette (1757–1834), French general and American Revolutionary War general also prominent in the French Revolution
- Sigmund Neuberger (1871–1911), German-born American illusionist under the stage name "The Great Lafayette"

== Places ==
=== United States ===
- LaFayette, Alabama, a city
- Lafayette, California, a city
- Lafayette, Colorado, a home rule municipality
- LaFayette, Georgia, a city
- La Fayette, Illinois, a village
- Lafayette, Indiana metropolitan area
- Lafayette, Indiana, a city
- LaFayette, Kentucky, a town
- Lafayette, Louisiana metropolitan area
- Lafayette, Louisiana, a city
  - Lafayette Parish, Louisiana
- Lafayette, Minnesota, a city
- LaFayette, New York, a town
- Lafayette, Ohio, a village
- Lafayette, Madison County, Ohio, a census-designated place
- Lafayette, Oregon, a city
- Lafayette, Tennessee, a city
- Lafayette, Virginia, a census-designated place
- Lafayette, Wisconsin (disambiguation)
- Faubourg Lafayette, Louisiana, a division in the city of New Orleans
- Mount Lafayette, New Hampshire
- Lafayette County (disambiguation)
- Lafayette Park (disambiguation)
- Lafayette Reservoir, Contra Costa County, California
- Lafayette River, entirely in the city of Norfolk, Virginia
- Lafayette Square (disambiguation)
- Lafayette Township (disambiguation)
- Lafayette Village, a historic district in North Kingstown, Rhode Island; on the National Register of Historic Places

=== Other countries ===
- Lafayette (Tunis), a district of Tunis, Tunisia

== Arts and entertainment ==
- La Fayette (film), also known as Lafayette, a 1961 French/Italian co-production starring Orson Welles and Pascale Audret
- "Lafayette (We Hear You Calling)", a 1918 World War I song composed by Mary Earl (Robert A. King)
- Lafayette, a Basset Hound in the animated film Aristocats
- Lafayette Reynolds, one of the principal characters in True Blood, an American TV series
- Lafayette O'Leary, the protagonist in four Keith Laumer science fiction novels

== Buildings ==
- Lafayette Building (disambiguation)
- Lafayette Hotel (disambiguation)
- Lafayette Theatre (disambiguation)

== Businesses ==
- Galeries Lafayette, a French department store chain
- LaFayette Motors, United States automobile manufacturer from the 1910s to the 1940s
- Lafayette Radio Electronics, an electronics retail chain that closed in 1981
- Lafayette (restaurant), a former French restaurant in New York City

== Military ==
- USS Lafayette, three US Navy ships
- Lafayette-class submarine, a class of US submarine
- French aircraft carrier La Fayette, a French aircraft carrier, formerly USS Langley (CVL-27)
- La Fayette-class frigate, a class of French frigates
  - French frigate La Fayette, a French stealth frigate, lead ship of the La Fayette class
- Fort Lafayette, a coastal fortification in the Narrows of New York Harbor
- Brigade La Fayette, also named Task Force La Fayette, a joint unit of the French forces in Afghanistan
- Lafayette Escadrille, a World War I squadron of the French Air Service composed largely of American pilots
- Lafayette Flying Corps, a name given to American volunteer pilots who flew for the French in World War I

== Schools ==
- University of Louisiana at Lafayette
- Lafayette College, a private coeducational college in Easton, Pennsylvania
  - Lafayette Leopards, Lafayette College's sports teams
- Lafayette High School (disambiguation)

== Transportation ==
- Lafayette Avenue (IND Fulton Street Line), Brooklyn, a New York City Subway station
- Broadway–Lafayette Street/Bleecker Street (New York City Subway) Manhattan
- Lafayette station (Indiana), an Amtrak station in Lafayette, Indiana
- Lafayette station (Louisiana), an Amtrak station in Lafayette, Louisiana
- Lafayette station (BART) is BART station in Lafayette, California
- Lafayette Square station, Buffalo, New York, Metro Rail station
- Lafayette Regional Airport Lafayette, Louisiana
- Lafayette Street a street in lower Manhattan, New York City
- Lafayette Boulevard a street in Detroit, Michigan
- Lafayette Bridge, spanning the Mississippi River in St Paul, Minnesota
- Rue La Fayette a street in Paris, France
- SS Lafayette (1900), a shipwreck in Lake Superior, United States
- SS Mexique, a French ocean liner that was called Lafayette from 1915 until 1928

== Other uses ==
- Lafayette Cemetery, a defunct cemetery in Philadelphia
- Lafayette Cemetery No. 1, a cemetery in New Orleans
- Lafayette Stakes, an annual American Thoroughbred horse race in Lexington, Kentucky
- 23244 Lafayette, a main-belt minor planet
- Lafayette meteorite, a nakhlite Martian meteorite

== See also ==
- Lafayette transmitter, a former transmitter for transatlantic services near Bordeaux, France
- West Lafayette
- Fayette (disambiguation)
