= Fayette =

Fayette may refer to:

== Places in the United States ==
- Fayette, Alabama, a city and county seat of Fayette County
- Fayette, Indiana, an unincorporated community
- Fayette, Iowa, a city
- Fayette, Maine, a town
- Fayette, Michigan, an unincorporated community
- Fayette, Mississippi, a city
- Fayette, Missouri, a city
- Fayette, New York, a town
- Fayette, Ohio, a village
- Fayette, Utah, a town
- Fayette, West Virginia, an unincorporated community
- Fayette, Wisconsin, a town
  - Fayette (community), Wisconsin, an unincorporated community
- Fayette City, Pennsylvania, a borough
- Fayette Historic State Park, Michigan
- Fayette County (disambiguation)
- Fayette Township (disambiguation)
- Fort Lafayette (Pennsylvania), later renamed Fort Fayette, constructed in 1792, abandoned in 1814

== People ==
- Fayette (given name)
- John Sykes Fayette (c. 1810–1876), Canadian-born American Presbyterian minister, Ohio's first African-American college graduate

== Schools ==
- Fayette High School (Ohio), Fayette, Ohio
- Fayette Christian School, Washington Court House, Ohio, a private Christian school
- Fayette County High School, Fayette, Alabama
- Fayette County High School (Georgia), Fayetteville, Georgia

== Transportation ==
- Fayette or Morenci branch, a former railway line in the states of Michigan and Ohio
- Fayette station (Iowa), a former railway station, on the National Register of Historic Places
- Fayette station, a Metroway bus station
- USS Fayette, an attack transport which served in World War II

== Other uses ==
- State Correctional Institution – Fayette, Fayette County, Pennsylvania, a maximum-security prison
- Fayette Mall, a shopping mall in Lexington, Kentucky
- Fayette Electric Cooperative, a non-profit rural electric utility cooperative headquartered in La Grange, Texas
- Fayette Power Project, Fayette County, Texas, a power plant
- Fayette Stakes, an American thoroughbred horse race

== See also ==
- Fayette National Bank Building, Lexington, Kentucky, a high-rise on the National Register of Historic Places
- Fayette Safety Vault and Trust Company Building, Lexington, Kentucky, a commercial building on the National Register of Historic Places
- Fayette Street Bridge, connecting Conshohocken with West Conshohocken, Pennsylvania
- Fayette Street Conservation Area, Indianapolis, Indiana
- Fayette Formation, a geologic formation in France
- Fayette Sandstone, a geologic formation in Texas
- Fayetteville (disambiguation)
- Lafayette (disambiguation)
