= Lafayette Street (disambiguation) =

Lafayette Street is a street in Lower Manhattan in New York City.

Lafayette Street may also refer to:

- Lafayette Street Cemetery, Detroit, Michigan
- Lafayette Street Overpass, historic bridge in Fayetteville, Arkansas

== See also ==
- Lafayette Place (disambiguation)
- LaFayette Road, in Georgia
- Lafayette Road, a section of U.S. Route 1 in New Hampshire
- Lafayette Square (disambiguation)
