= SS Lafayette =

Several merchant ships have been named SS Lafayette.

- SS Lafayette (1900), US propeller, lake freighter, Official No. 141657.
- SS Lafayette (1914), French propeller, ocean liner.

== See also ==
- USS Lafayette
