= Lafayette Township, Illinois =

Lafayette Township may refer to one of the following places in the State of Illinois:

- Lafayette Township, Coles County, Illinois
- LaFayette Township, Ogle County, Illinois

See also

- Lafayette Township (disambiguation)
