= Lafayette metropolitan area =

The Lafayette metropolitan area may refer to:

- The Lafayette metropolitan area, Louisiana, United States
- The Lafayette metropolitan area, Indiana, United States

== See also ==
- Lafayette (disambiguation)
