= Lafayette Hotel =

Lafayette Hotel or Hotel Lafayette may refer to:

- Hotel Lafayette, an historic hotel in Buffalo, New York built between 1902 and 1911
- Hotel Lafayette (New York City), a hotel and restaurant which operated in New York City from 1902 to 1949
- LaFayette Hotel, an historic hotel in Little Rock, Arkansas built in 1925
- The Lafayette Hotel and Club, a hotel in San Diego, California built in 1946
- The Lafayette Hotel in Marietta, Ohio built in 1918

== See also ==
- Lafayette (disambiguation)
