= Strawn, Illinois =

- Village
- Location in Livingston County, Illinois
- Coordinates: 40°39′13″N 88°24′00″W
- Country: United States
- State: Illinois
- County: Livingston
- Township: Fayette

Area
  - Total: 0.51 sq mi (1.32 km^{2})
  - Land: 0.51 sq mi (1.32 km^{2})
  - Water: 0 sq mi (0.00 km^{2})
- Elevation: 771 ft (235 m)

Population (2020)
  - Total: 101
  - Density: 198.2/sq mi (76.52/km^{2})
- Time zone: UTC-6 (CST)
  - Summer (DST): UTC-5 (CDT)
- ZIP code: 61775
- Area codes: 815 & 779
- FIPS code: 17-73131
- GNIS feature ID: 2399919

Strawn is a village in Livingston County, Illinois, United States. As of the 2020 census, the village had a population of 101.

== History ==
=== Founding and design of Strawn ===
Strawn was laid out on June 6, 1873, by David Strawn (October 1, 1818 – September 25, 1873). David Strawn had moved to La Salle County, Illinois, with his family in 1830 from Preble County, Ohio, and in 1835 had settled in South Ottawa Township. He had been elected to the Illinois General Assembly and, by the time the Town of Strawn was platted, he had become a very wealthy land owner. In addition to his La Salle County holdings, Strawn owned thousands of acres in Livingston County. David Strawn never lived in the town that had been named in his honor. The Chicago and Paducah Railroad was at that time being built through Fayette Township in Livingston County. Alfred C. Hueston, the Livingston County Surveyor, laid out the town. He staked out ten blocks on the west side of the tracks, each divided into nine to twenty-four lots. The town was aligned with the railroad tracks rather than in true compass directions. Strawn was unusual because it was designed with a Public Square, a feature common in Illinois towns of the 1830s, but much less so in Illinois towns of the 1870s. Hueston also included a square in his design of the Livingston County town of Cornell, laid out in 1871. There was a Depot Ground near the tracks and the station was on the west side of the tracks.

=== Early events in Strawn ===
Historical population
Census	Pop.	Note	%±
1880	331		—
1890	233		−29.6%
1900	224		−3.9%
1910	277		23.7%
1920	248		−10.5%
1930	221		−10.9%
1940	199		−10.0%
1950	173		−13.1%
1960	152		−12.1%
1970	144		−5.3%
1980	143		−0.7%
1990	132		−7.7%
2000	104		−21.2%
2010	100		−3.8%
2020	101		1.0%
U.S. Decennial Census

In an effort to attract people to the town, Strawn decided that every alternate lot would be offered free of charge to anyone who would erect a house. The houses had to be of a specified size and they had to be finished quickly; Strawn was emphatic that he did not want "shanties" either as homes or as places of business. E. H. Roberts bought the first lot on the first day they were offered for sale. Many doubted Strawn would be a success.

John Colfer built the first house in Strawn; it was soon converted into a hotel. Roberts also had the distinction of being partner in Aaron, Roberts and Company, the firm that sold the first goods in the town. By 1878 Strawn had eight stores, a harness shop, a blacksmith shop, shoe shops, a grain business and a saloon. A Post Office was established in 1873. On July 1, 1873, the railroad station opened for business. On that day, the first item shipped into Strawn arrived: a barrel of meat bound for the boarding house operated by S.K. Mitchell. Six days later the first freight shipped out of town was sent off: a carload of hogs loaded by Walter D. Strawn, son of the town's founder, who was operating a nearby farm. The first school in Strawn was taught by Sarah Hanagan in the summer of 1873. The Railroad eventually became part of the Wabash system later on the Bloomer Line. Soon after its founding the population of Strawn grew rapidly, but this growth was not sustained.

== Geography ==
Strawn is located in southeastern Livingston County.

According to the 2021 census gazetteer files, Strawn has a total area of 0.51 square miles (1.32 km^{2}), all land.

== Demographics ==
As of the 2020 census there were 101 people, 35 households, and 23 families residing in the village. The population density was 198.04 inhabitants per square mile (76.46/km^{2}). There were 43 housing units at an average density of 84.31 per square mile (32.55/km^{2}). The racial makeup of the village was 96.04% White, 0.00% African American, 0.00% Native American, 0.00% Asian, 0.00% Pacific Islander, 0.00% from other races, and 3.96% from two or more races. Hispanic or Latino of any race were 2.97% of the population.

There were 35 households, out of which 31.4% had children under the age of 18 living with them, 54.29% were married couples living together, 5.71% had a female householder with no husband present, and 34.29% were non-families. 28.57% of all households were made up of individuals, and 0.00% had someone living alone who was 65 years of age or older. The average household size was 3.00 and the average family size was 2.43.

The village's age distribution consisted of 23.5% under the age of 18, 14.1% from 18 to 24, 27.1% from 25 to 44, 28.2% from 45 to 64, and 7.1% who were 65 years of age or older. The median age was 36.3 years. For every 100 females, there were 112.5 males. For every 100 females age 18 and over, there were 140.7 males.

The median income for a household in the village was $58,750, and the median income for a family was $83,750. Males had a median income of $43,333 versus $24,375 for females. The per capita income for the village was $31,311. About 17.4% of families and 27.1% of the population were below the poverty line, including 55.0% of those under age 18 and 0.0% of those age 65 or over.
