= Lafayette Township =

Lafayette Township may refer to:

== Arkansas ==
- Lafayette Township, Lonoke County, Arkansas, in Lonoke County, Arkansas
- Lafayette Township, Ouachita County, Arkansas, in Ouachita County, Arkansas
- Lafayette Township, Scott County, Arkansas, in Scott County, Arkansas

== Illinois ==
- Lafayette Township, Coles County, Illinois
- LaFayette Township, Ogle County, Illinois

== Indiana ==
- Lafayette Township, Allen County, Indiana
- Lafayette Township, Floyd County, Indiana
- Lafayette Township, Madison County, Indiana
- Lafayette Township, Owen County, Indiana

== Iowa ==
- Lafayette Township, Allamakee County, Iowa
- Lafayette Township, Bremer County, Iowa
- Lafayette Township, Keokuk County, Iowa
- Lafayette Township, Story County, Iowa

== Kansas ==
- Lafayette Township, Chautauqua County, Kansas

== Michigan ==
- Lafayette Township, Michigan

== Minnesota ==
- Lafayette Township, Minnesota

== Missouri ==
- Lafayette Township, Clinton County, Missouri
- Lafayette Township, St. Louis County, Missouri, in St. Louis County, Missouri

== New Jersey ==
- Lafayette Township, New Jersey

== Ohio ==
- Lafayette Township, Coshocton County, Ohio
- Lafayette Township, Medina County, Ohio

== Pennsylvania ==
- Lafayette Township, Pennsylvania

== See also ==
- Fayette Township (disambiguation)
