= Fayetteville metropolitan area =

Fayetteville metropolitan area may refer to:

- Northwest Arkansas, comprises the Fayetteville metropolitan area
- Fayetteville metropolitan area, North Carolina

== See also ==
- Fayetteville (disambiguation)
