= Word of Honor (1981 film) =

- Genre: Drama
- Written by: I.C. Rapoport
- Screenplay by: David Ackles; Douglas Graham
- Story by: David Ackles; Douglas Graham
- Directed by: Mel Damski
- Starring: Karl Malden; Rue McClanahan; Ron Silver
- Theme music composer: Bruce Langhorne
- Country of origin: United States
- Original language: English

Production
- Executive producers: Susan Clark; Alex Karras
- Producer: John C. Dutton
- Production locations: Daily Tribune - Royal Oak, Michigan; Seminole Hills - Pontiac, Michigan; Detroit, Michigan; Penniman Market - 820 Penniman Avenue, Plymouth, Michigan
- Cinematography: Jules Brenner
- Editor: John Farrell
- Running time: 96 min.
- Production company: Georgian Bay Productions

Original release
- Network: CBS
- Release: January 6, 1981

Word of Honor is a 1981 television film co-written by David Ackles and I.C. Rapoport. It first aired on 6 January 1981 starred Karl Malden and featured appearances by a young Ron Silver and the film debut of John Malkovich. It was directed by Mel Damski. This film was produced by Alex Karras and his wife Susan Clark. Karras often makes cameo appearances in films he produces; in this film he appeared as Penniman Butcher (uncredited). Much of this film was shot in Michigan in places such as Plymouth, where the opening beauty-pageant scene was shot. The newsroom shots were filmed at The Daily Tribune offices in Royal Oak and the real-life editors and reporters were used as extras. Residential shots, including the main characters' home, was shot in the Seminole Hills subdivision of Pontiac.

== Synopsis ==
A reporter refuses to reveal his source in the case of the murder of a young girl. As a result, he and his family are shunned by the residents of the small town in which they live. Virtually no one comes to his daughter's wedding, and at his office, the police search his desk, his boss threatens to fire him, the judge holds him in contempt and throws him in jail. At the last minute the source agrees to testify.

== Cast ==
- Karl Malden ... Mike McNeill
- Rue McClanahan ... Maggie McNeill
- Ron Silver ... David Lerner
- Largo Woodruff ... Amy
- Alexa Kenin ... Beverly
- Jacqueline Brookes ... Spinner
- Jeffrey DeMunn ... Dist. Atty. Burke (as Jeff DeMunn)
- Henderson Forsythe ... Peterson
- John Marley ... Gordon Agee
- Council Cargle
- Dan Lounsbery
- John Malkovich ... Gary
- Betsy Baker ... Denise McNeil

== Production crew ==
- Produced by Susan Clark .... executive producer
- John C. Dutton .... producer
- Alex Karras .... executive producer
- G. Chevalier Kevorkian .... associate producer
- Original Music by Bruce Langhorne
- Cinematography by Jules Brenner
- Film Editing by John Farrell
- Casting by Nancy E. Kelley (as Nancy Kelley)
- Set Decoration by Gary Papierski
