= Capitol–Main Historic District =

Historic district in Arkansas, United States

- U.S. National Register of Historic Places
- U.S. Historic district
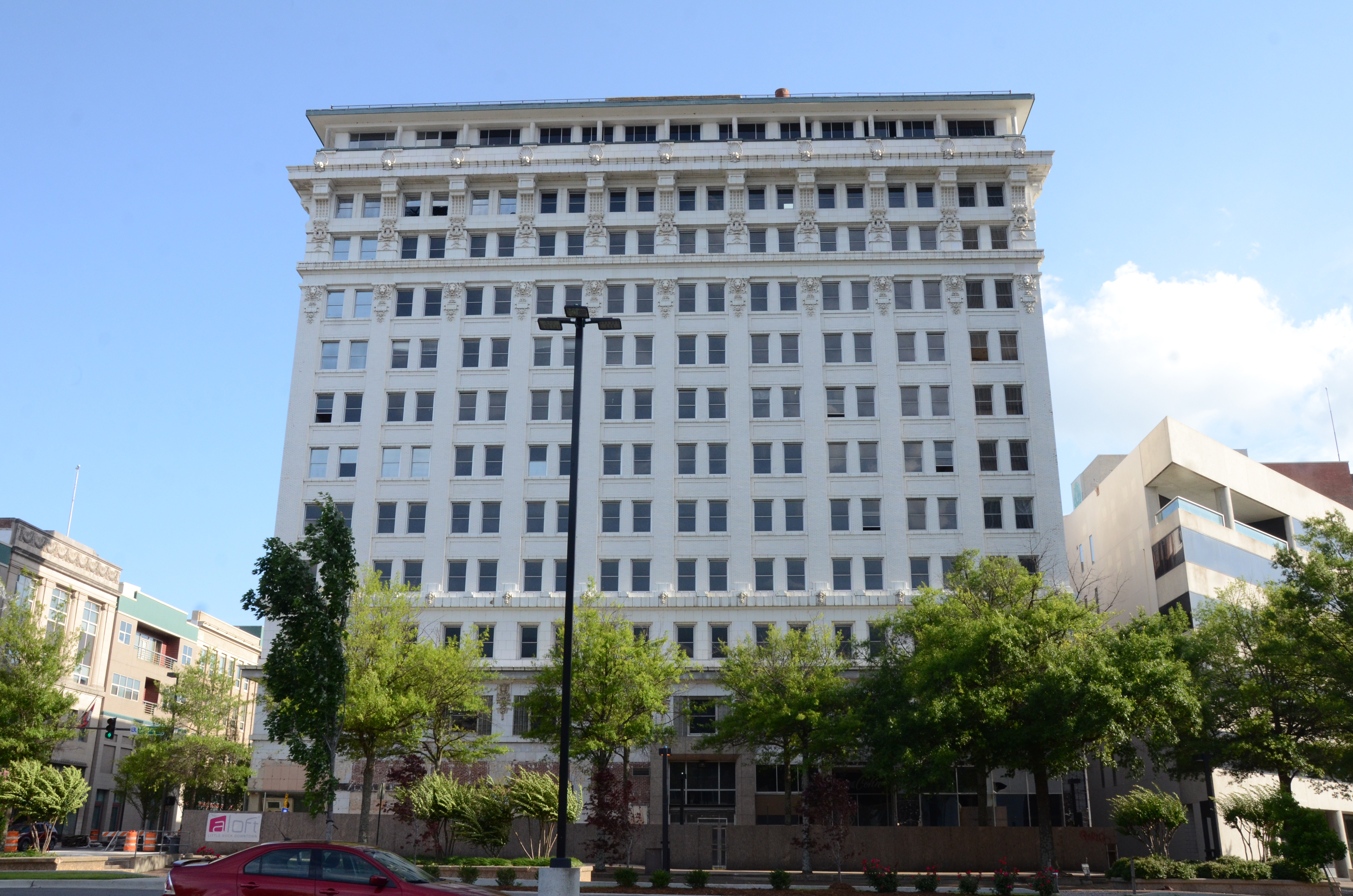

- Location within Arkansas Location within the United States
- Location: 500 block of Main St., 100-200 blocks of W. Capitol Ave., 500 block of Center St. & 100-200 blocks of W. 6th Sts., Little Rock, Arkansas
- Coordinates: 34°44′38″N 92°16′21″W
- Area: 7.5 acres (3.0 ha)
- Built: 1899
- NRHP reference No.: 11001050 (original); 100010306 (increase)

Significant dates
- Added to NRHP: April 2, 2012
- Boundary increase: April 30, 2024

The Capitol–Main Historic District encompasses a well-preserved area of early 19th-century commercial architecture in downtown Little Rock, Arkansas. The district includes 2-1/2 blocks of Capitol Street, extending east from Center Street, one block of Main Street south of Capitol, and one block of 6th Street west of Main. The buildings in this area were mostly built before World War II, and are of a more modest scale than modern sections of the downtown. Notable buildings include the LaFayette Hotel and the Pfeifer Brothers Department Store.

The district was listed on the National Register of Historic Places in 2012.

== See also ==
- National Register of Historic Places listings in Little Rock, Arkansas
