= Lafayette Building =

Lafayette Building may refer to:

- Lafayette Building (Washington, D.C.)
- Lafayette Building (Detroit)
- Lafayette House, a prominent building on D'Olier Street, in south Dublin, Ireland
- John Mark Verdier House, also known as Lafayette Building, in Beaufort, South Carolina
