= Lafayette Methodist Church =

Historic church in Kentucky, United States

- U.S. National Register of Historic Places
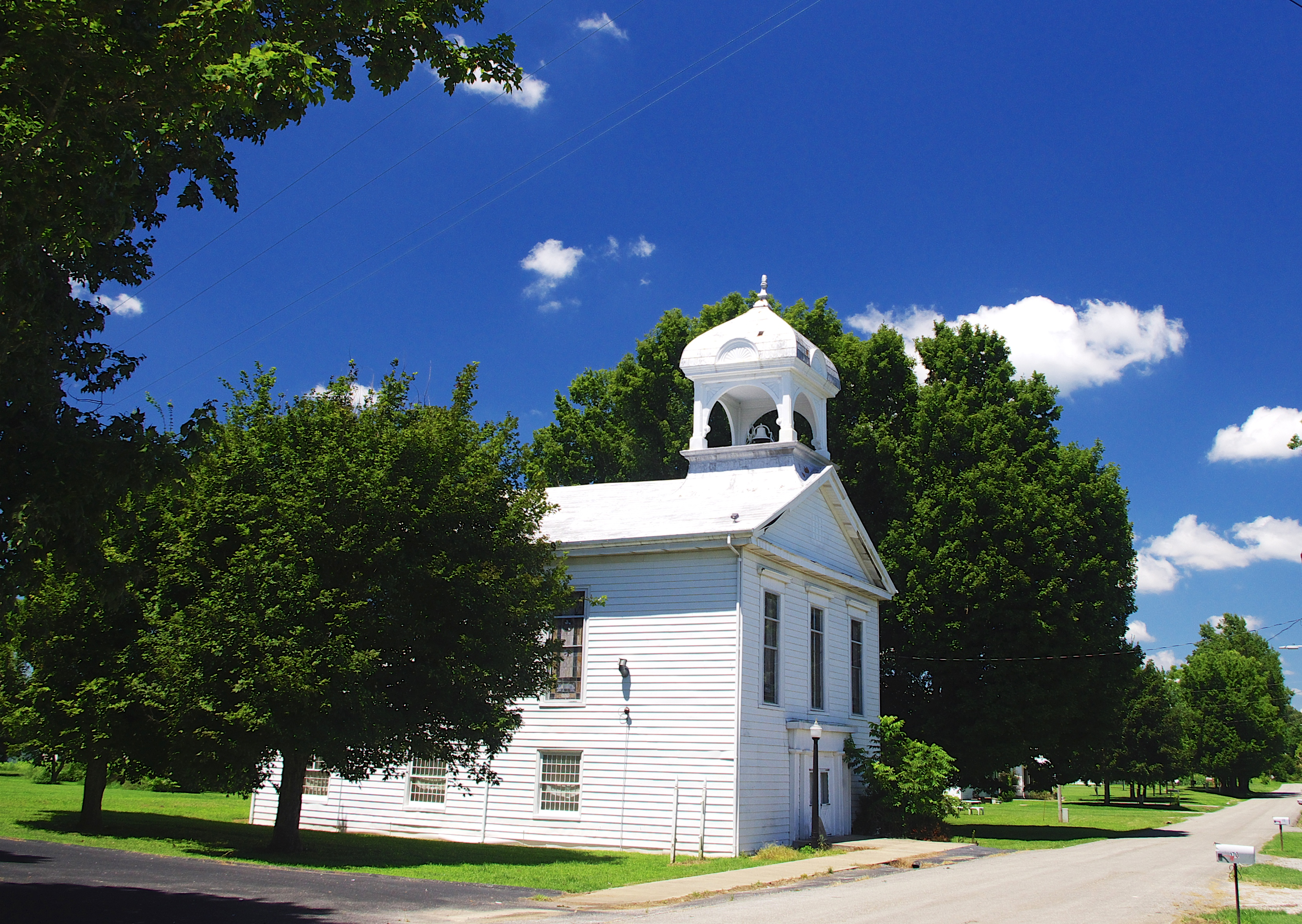
- Lafayette Methodist Church

- Location within Kentucky Location within the United States
- Location: Off SR 107, LaFayette, Kentucky
- Coordinates: 36.65992°N 87.65926°W
- Area: Less than 1-acre (0.40 ha)
- Built: 1852
- Architect: Umbenhour, Dan
- Architectural style: Greek Revival
- MPS: Christian County MRA
- NRHP reference No.: 79003616
- Added to NRHP: April 30, 1979

Lafayette Methodist Church is a historic church off SR 107 in LaFayette, Kentucky, United States.

It was built in 1852 by Dutch-born builder Daniel Umbenhour (1816–1886), and added to the National Register of Historic Places in 1979. It contains Greek Revival elements and an unusual belfry.
