= Adamo Demolition =

US asbestos remediation and demolition company

Adamo Group
- Industry: Demolition/Decontamination
- Founded: 1964
- Founder: John T. Adamo Sr.
- Headquarters: Detroit, Michigan
- Key people: Richard Adamo (President) Rick Cuppetilli (Executive Vice President) Tim Gunn (Chief Financial Officer) Brian Haller (Vice President)
- Revenue: $48 million (2015)
- Number of employees: 100 (2026)
- Website: www.adamogroup.com

Adamo Demolition (Adamo Group) is a Detroit-based demolition, remediation, redevelopment and asbestos company founded in 1964 that specializes in industrial projects.

== History ==
Founded in 1964, initially as Adamo Wrecking Co. by John T. Adamo Sr., Adamo began as a family-owned contractor serving the metro-Detroit area. The company’s first project was completed the same year, utilizing a Caterpillar 977H loader as part of its early equipment fleet. Over the following decades, the company expanded its capabilities and geographic reach, evolving from a local family-owned contractor into a national demolition and environmental services firm.

In 1972, Adamo became a charter and founding member of the National Demolition Association (NDA).

In 1978, Adamo Wrecking Co. was involved in the United States Supreme Court case Adamo Wrecking Co. v. United States, which challenged emission standards established under the Clean Air Act. The Court ruled in favor of Adamo, determining that the regulation at issue did not meet the statutory definition of an emission standard. The case later influenced the development of EPA work-practice standards under the Clean Air Act.[9]

In 1984, Adamo established its headquarters on East Seven Mile Road in Detroit, Michigan.

John T. Adamo Jr., assumed responsibilities as CEO of the company in 1998. During the early 2000s, the company was renamed Adamo Group to reflect its expansion beyond demolition into many assets.

Richard Adamo assumed responsibilities as president in 2016, continuing the company’s growth and expansion of its national operations.

In 2018, Adamo group received a World Demolition Award for its work on the Georgia Dome project.

In 2025, founder John T. Adamo Sr., was honored with the National Demolition Association Lifetime Achievement Award in recognition of his contributions to the demolition industry and the association.

Adamo Demolition Company has demolished many well-known, major structures such as: Georgia Dome, Park Avenue Hotel, Pontiac Silverdome, Northville Psychiatric Hospital, and the Riverwalk Hotel.They have also demolished many buildings considered historically significant such as the Lafayette Building and Madison-Lenox Hotel. In 1978, the company won a case in the United States Supreme Court that led to reformed NESHAP regulations.

By 2019, Adamo Group had demolished 3,397 buildings for the city of Detroit, earning over $56 million.

== Safety ==
Adamo Demolition has been awarded numerous safety awards that include:

- Adamo was awarded the first annual Mike Casbon Safety Award at the National Demolition Association annual convention that took place in Austin, TX Feb. 25, 2020.
- Participated in the Detroit Airport Safety Day 2019
- 2014 Environmental Excellence Award from the National Demolition Association

== Worlds First Volvo EC950 High Reach ==
Adamo Demolition utilized the first Volvo EC950 High Reach in the world in May 2026. The high reach excavator has a maximum height of 161 ft.

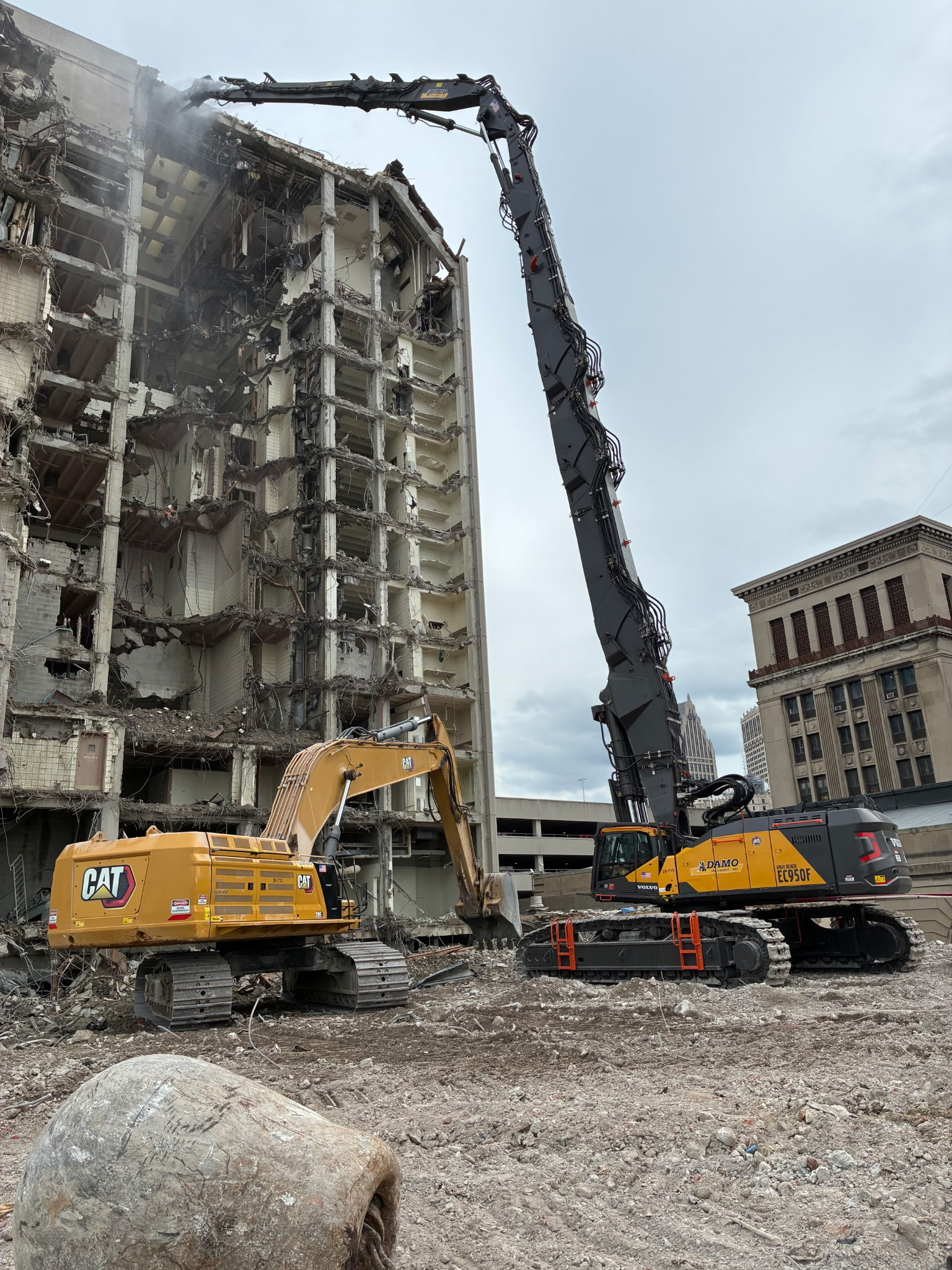
High Reach Demolition Excavator
