= Lafayette Place =

Lafayette Place may refer to the following places in the United States:

- Lafayette Place, New York
- Lafayette Place, Boston, Massachusetts
- Lafayette Place, Fort Wayne, Indiana

== See also ==
- Lafayette Square (disambiguation)
