= New Iberia station =

Train station in New Iberia, Louisiana, US

New Iberia, LA
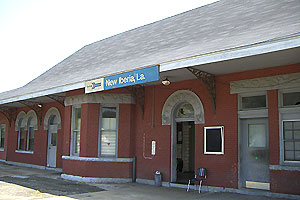

General information
- Location: 402 West Washington Street; New Iberia, Louisiana; United States
- Coordinates: 30°00′31″N 91°49′26″W
- Owner: Louisiana and Delta Railroad
- Line: BNSF/UP Lafayette Subdivision
- Platforms: 1 side platform
- Tracks: 2

Other information
- Station code: Amtrak: NIB

History
- Opened: 1900

Passengers
- FY 2025: 1,340 (Amtrak)

Services
Preceding station	Amtrak	Following station
Lafayette toward Los Angeles	Sunset Limited	Schriever toward New Orleans
Former services
Preceding station	Southern Pacific Railroad	Following station
Lake Charles toward Los Angeles	Sunset Route	Bayou Sale toward New Orleans
- Southern Pacific Railroad Depot
- U.S. National Register of Historic Places
- Area: 0.7 acres (0.3 ha)
- Built: 1900
- Architect: Southern Pacific Railroad
- NRHP reference No.: 87002082
- Added to NRHP: November 30, 1987
Location

New Iberia station is a train station in New Iberia, Louisiana, United States. It is served by Amtrak, the national railroad passenger system.

== History ==
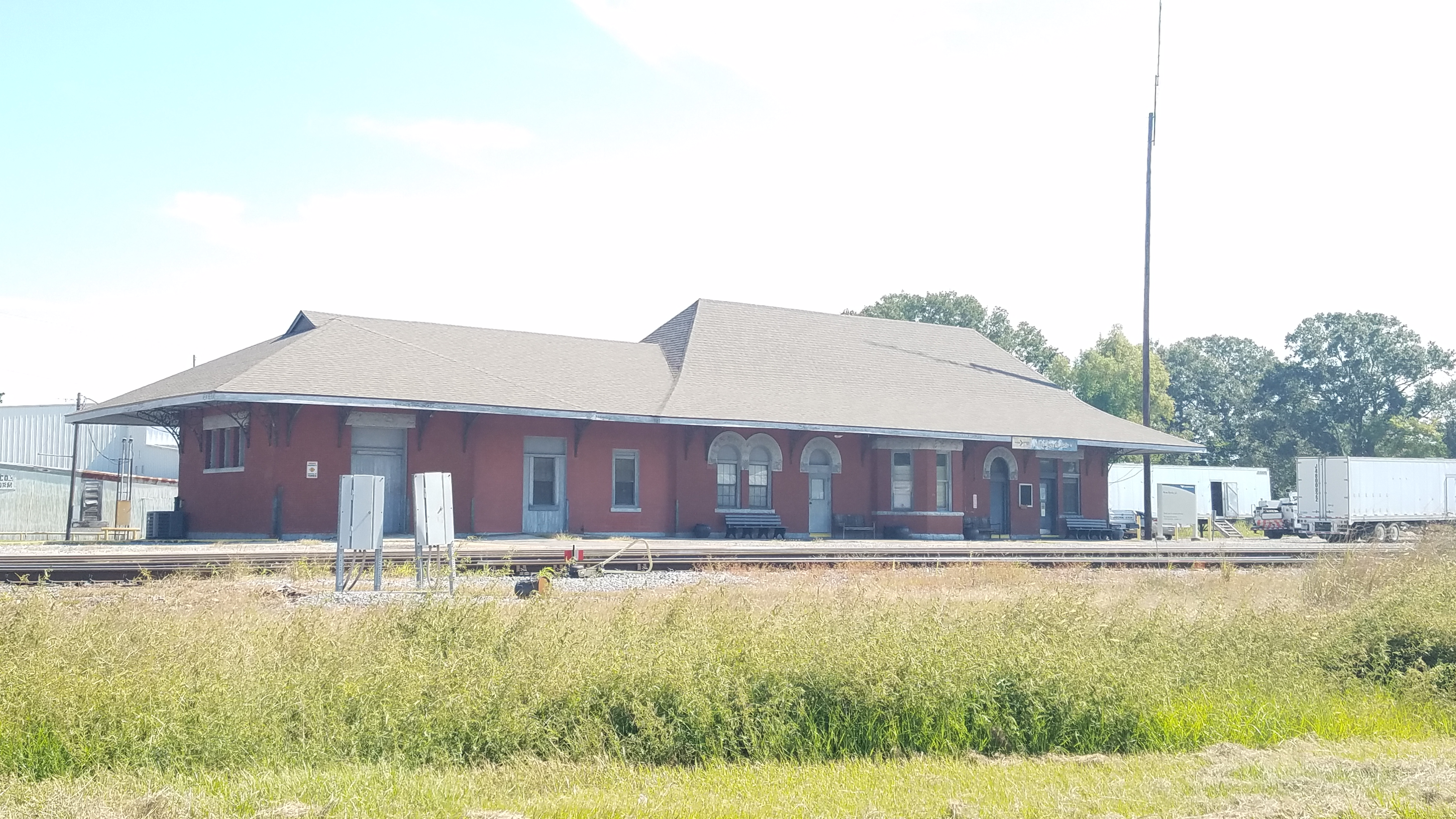
A picture of New Iberia station from the across street.

The station was originally built in 1900 by the Texas and New Orleans Railroad. It also serves as the headquarters of the Louisiana and Delta Railroad. Coincidentally, the year the L&D was established, the station was listed on the National Register of Historic Places as the Southern Pacific Railroad Depot.

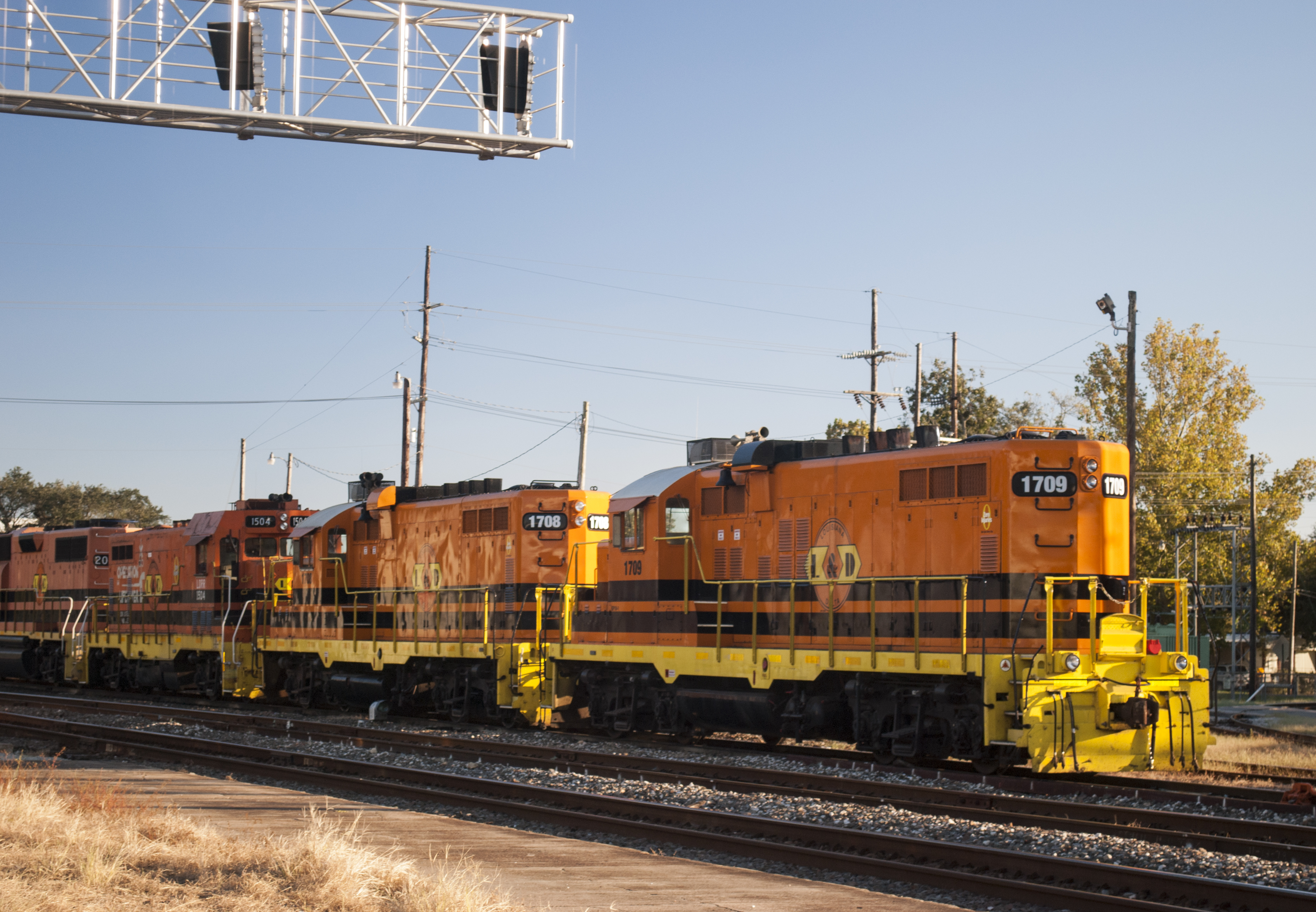
L & D locomotives in the freight yard

== See also ==
- National Register of Historic Places listings in Iberia Parish, Louisiana
