= Council Cargle =

American actor

- Born: Council Cargle; February 8, 1935; Detroit, Michigan
- Died: January 2, 2013 (aged 77)
- Education: Wayne State University
- Occupation: Actor
- Years active: 1973–2013
- Spouse: Maggie Porter

Council Cargle (February 8, 1935 – January 2, 2013) was an American stage and film actor, whose career in theater spanned more than six decades. Based in Detroit, Cargle was described as one of the "best-known theater actors" in the U.S. state of Michigan. His film credits included Detroit 9000 in 1973, Word of Honor, a 1981 television movie, and Quentin Tarantino's Jackie Brown in 1997.

== Biography ==
Cargle was born on February 8, 1935, in Detroit, Michigan. His mother, Alice Cargle, worked as a domestic and housekeeper. Cargle was raised in Detroit's East Side neighborhood and began acting when he was ten years old, charging friends a dime for a performance. He graduated from Northeastern High School in Detroit and took a job with the Detroit Traffic Court when he was seventeen years old. He earned a bachelor's degree from Wayne State University.

Outside of acting, Cargle worked as a deputy clerk for District Judge Denise Page Hood of Michigan's 36th District Court. He retired after Judge Hood took a position with the city's Recorder's Court in 1989.

Cargle's first professional show was with the Civic Players. Over the next sixty years, he is believed to have performed with most of the major theaters and theater companies in southeast Michigan. He particularly active with the Detroit Repertory Theater, Plowshares Theatre Company, and the Jewish Ensemble Theatre Company.

Cargle and his wife, Maggie Porter, co-founded the Harmonie Park Playhouse in 1985 in the basement of the Madison-Lenox Hotel. The performing space had previously served as a barbershop and artist studio before the couple transformed it into a 40-seat theater for off-Broadway productions. The Harmonie Park Playhouse closed in 1990. (The Madison-Lenox Hotel was demolished in 2005).

Cargle's last public performance was in the role of Simon in "The Whipping Man," a play jointly produced by Plowshares Theatre Company and the Jewish Ensemble Theatre Company.

Council Cargle died on January 2, 2013, at the age of 77. He was survived by his wife, Maggie Porter. Cargle was planning to perform August Wilson's "Gem of the Ocean" during the spring of 2013 at the time of his death. He was also auditioning for new roles at the Detroit Repertory Theatre, where he had performed for more than fifty years.

== Notable theater credits ==
=== Detroit Repertory Theater ===
- Ceremonies in Dark Old Men
- Fences
- Joe Turner's Come and Gone
- Radio Golf

=== Jewish Ensemble Theatre ===
- I'm Not Rappaport - Cargle won "Best Actor" awards from the Detroit Free Press and The Oakland Press for this role.

=== Plowshare Theater Company ===
- The Piano Lesson
- The Talented Tenth
- Two Trains Running
- Full Circle

== Filmography ==
Year	Title	Role	Notes
1973	Detroit 9000	Drew Sheppard	
1981	Word of Honor		TV movie
2001	The Elevator	Judge	TV movie
