= Lafayette (name) =

Lafayette or La Fayette, is originally a surname or a toponym coming from the Occitan words la faieta and that designates a beech forest.

Due to the fame of American Revolutionary War commander Marquis de Lafayette, Lafayette is also a given name in the United States.

Notable people with the name include:

== Surname ==
- Andrée Lafayette (1903–1989), French actress
- Bernard Lafayette (1940–2026), American civil rights activist and organizer
- Ivan Lafayette (1930–2016), longtime member of the New York State Assembly (1977–2008)
- James Lafayette (1853–1923), pseudonym of James Stack Lauder, portrait photographer,
- James Armistead Lafayette (c. 1760–1830), aka James Armistead, African-American Revolutionary War spy
- Nathan LaFayette (born 1973), former National Hockey League player
- Oliver Lafayette (born 1984), American professional basketball player
- Ross Lafayette (born 1985), English professional footballer
- Ruby Lafayette (1844–1935), American film actress
- Virginie de Pusy Lafayette (born 1970), French clubwoman

== Given name ==
- Lafayette C. Baker (1826–1868), American investigator and Union spy during the American Civil War; promoted for his part in apprehending Lincoln's assassins
- Lafayette Bunnell (1824–1903), American physician, explorer and author
- Lafayette Caskey (1823–1881), a member of the Wisconsin State Assembly
- La Fayette Eastman (1819–1898), a member of the Wisconsin State Assembly
- LaFayette Emmett (1822–1905), American lawyer, second attorney general of the Minnesota Territory and first chief justice of the Minnesota Supreme Court
- Lafayette Rodrigues Pereira (1834–1917), Brazilian Prime Minister
- Lafayette L. Foster (1851–1901), American academic administrator, politician, and journalist
- Lafayette S. Foster (1806–1880), American senator from Connecticut and Connecticut Supreme Court judge
- Lafayette Gilchrist (born 1967), American jazz pianist and composer
- La Fayette Grover (1823–1911), American Democratic politician and lawyer from the U.S. state of Oregon
- Lafayette Guild (1826–1870), United States Army and Confederate States Army surgeon; pioneer in the study of yellow fever
- Lafayette Head (1825–1897), Colorado legislator and first Lieutenant Governor of Colorado
- Lafayette Holbrook (1850–1941), mayor of Provo, Utah
- Lafayette Ronald Hubbard (1911–1986), better known as L. Ron Hubbard, science fiction author and founder of Scientology
- Lafayette Lane (1842–1896), Representative from Oregon
- Lafayette Leake (1919–1990), blues and jazz pianist, organist, vocalist and composer
- Lafayette S. Lafe McKee (1872–1959), American actor who appeared in more than 400 films from 1912 to 1948.
- LaFayette Fayette McMullen (1805–1880), American politician and banker; Virginia state senator, member of the U.S. and Confederate House of Representatives, and Territorial Governor of Washington
- Lafayette McLaws (1821–1897), Confederate general during the American Civil War
- Lafayette Mendel (1872–1935), American biochemist
- Lafayette F. Mosher (1824–1894), American politician and judge in Oregon
- Lafayette Lever (born 1960), also known as "Fat Lever", former professional basketball player
- LaFayette L. Patterson (1888–1987), Representative from Alabama
- Lafayette Russell (1905–1978), college and National Football League running back
- Lafayette Young (1848–1926), newspaper reporter and editor, and briefly Republican Senator from Iowa

== See also ==
- House of La Fayette
- Lafe, a list of people with the given name, often as a short form of Lafayette
- Lafayette (disambiguation)
- Fayette (given name)
- John Sykes Fayette (c. 1810–1876), Canadian-born American Presbyterian minister, Ohio's first African-American college graduate
