= Lafe =

Lafe is a masculine given name or nickname, often a short form or hypocorism of Lafayette.

Notable people with the name include:

- Lafayette B. Gleason (1863–1937), American politician
- Lafe McKee (1872–1959), American actor
- Oliver Lafayette Parks (1899–1985), American aviation entrepreneur whose training schools provided basic training to many World War II pilots
- Lafe Pence (1857–1923), American politician
- Lafe Solomon, the National Labor Relations Board's Acting General Counsel in 2010
- Charles Lafayette Todd (1911–2004), American folklorist
- Lafe Ward (1925–2013), American politician and lawyer
