= Madison-Lenox Hotel =

United States historic center demolished

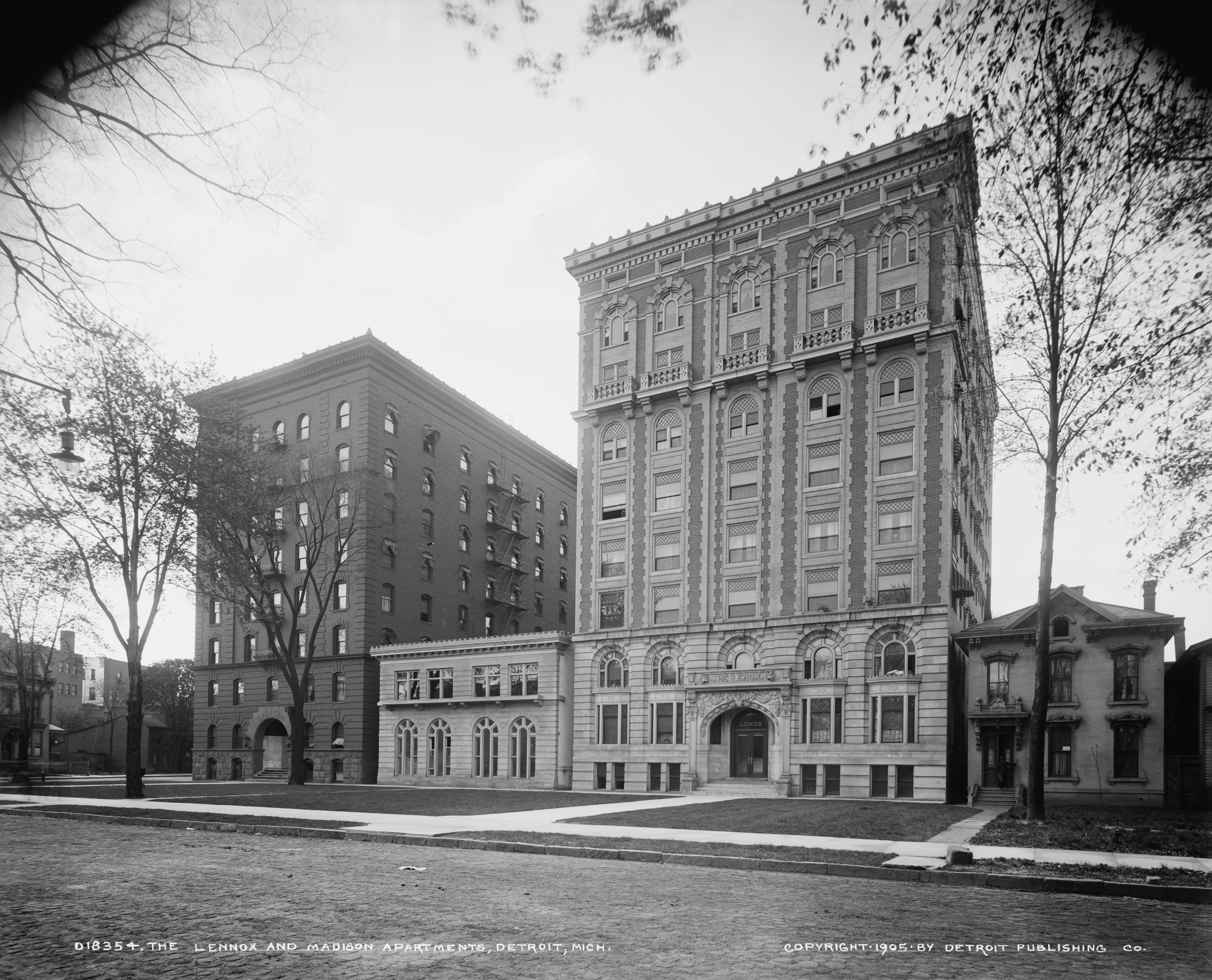
- Madison-Lenox Hotel, c. 1905

- Location within Michigan

General information
- Status: Demolished
- Type: Hotel
- Location: 200-246 Madison Street; Detroit, Michigan, United States
- Coordinates: 42.3366°N 83.0487°W
- Completed: 1900, 1903
- Demolished: 2005

Technical details
- Floor count: 8

Design and construction
- Architects: F.C. Pollmar & A.C. Varney

The Madison-Lenox Hotel was a hotel complex located at 200-246 Madison Street in Detroit, Michigan.

== History ==
Originally designed as the Madison Hotel by F.C. Pollmar and Almon C. Varney in 1900 and the Lenox Hotel by A.C. Varney in 1903. A two-story building between the two hotels later connected the pair, creating the Madison-Lenox Hotel. The buildings were last occupied during the 1990s. The hotels stood at the south-west corner of Madison Street and East Grand River Avenue, across the street from the Detroit Athletic Club.

The building cost $100,000 to build, equivalent to $2.55 million today.

In 1985, theater actor Council Cargle and his wife, Maggie Porter, founded the 40-seat Harmonie Park Playhouse in the basement of the Madison-Lenox Hotel. The basement theater, which had previously been utilized as a barbershop and artist studio, was used for off-Broadway productions until the theater's closure in 1990.

== Demolition ==
In 2004 a group led by sport team owner Mike Ilitch submitted requests for the building's demolition to Detroit's Historic District Commission (HDC). These requests were quickly denied and the building stood. Despite offers by developers interested in the building, Ilitch declined to sell the property, preferring to demolish the structures to create a parking lot. Both the City of Detroit and Ilitch were hoping to get the building demolished and the land cleared before Detroit hosted Super Bowl XL on February 5, 2006.

In 2004, the National Trust for Historic Preservation added the building to its annual list of America's 11 Most Endangered Historic Places.

The May 2005 demolition by Adamo Group was the subject of significant controversy. Though demolition permits had been denied the city government pressed for the building's destruction nevertheless, stating that the structure was in danger of collapse. Preservation groups fought the demolition with a restraining order a few hours after work commenced, but later that day a judge allowed the demolition to continue. Even though the HDC had originally denied demolition permits they did not oppose the move. The whole structure was gone within a week.

The building was the second on the "11 Most Endangered Historic Places" to be demolished.

The property is still held by Ilitch Holdings and is currently used as a parking lot. The gated parking area is serviced by Olympia Entertainment and chiefly serves Comerica Park.
