= Pfeifer Brothers Department Store =

- U.S. National Register of Historic Places
- U.S. Historic district – Contributing property
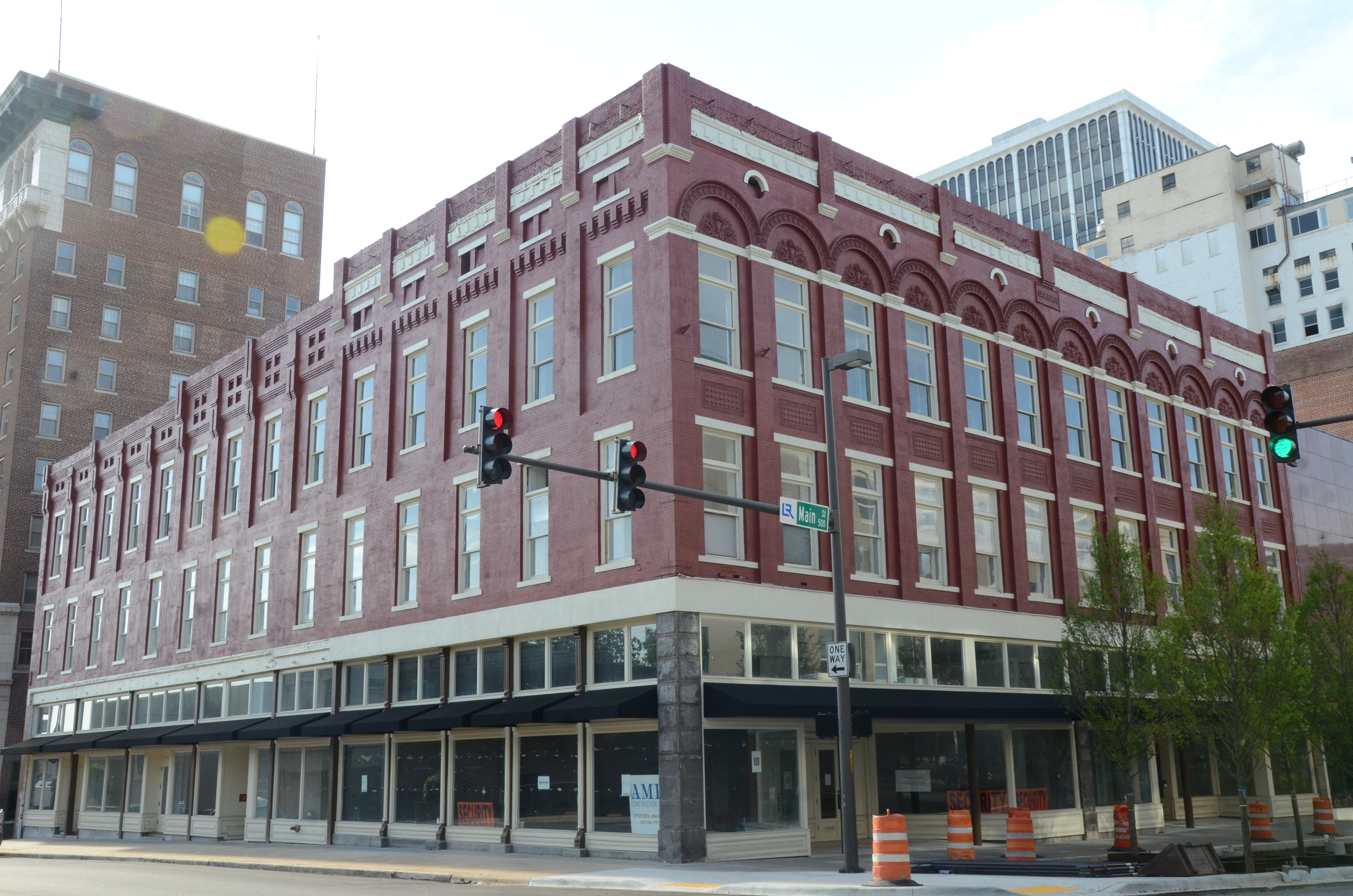

- Location within Arkansas Location within the United States
- Location: 524 S. Main St., Little Rock, Arkansas
- Coordinates: 34°44′34″N 92°16′16″W
- Area: less than one acre
- Built: 1899
- Built by: Lasker Brothers
- Architect: Charles L. Thompson
- Architectural style: Romanesque
- Part of: Capitol-Main Historic District (ID11001050)
- NRHP reference No.: 00000464

Significant dates
- Added to NRHP: May 18, 2000
- Designated CP: April 2, 2012

The Pfeifer Brothers Department Store is a historic commercial building at 522-24 South Main Street in downtown Little Rock, Arkansas. It is a large three story brick structure, with load bearing brick walls and internal steel framing. The ground floor is lined with commercial plate glass display windows, separated by brick pilasters capped with capitals made of terra cotta.

Entrances appear on facades facing both Main and Sixth Streets. Above the third-floor windows on the Main Street facade there are round-arch elements with small round windows above, while the Sixth Street facade has corbelled brick elements in the same area. Built in 1899 by the Lasker Brothers to a design by Charles L. Thompson, it was for many years home to the Pfeifer Brothers store, one of the city's leading department stores.

The building was listed on the National Register of Historic Places in 2000.

== See also ==
- National Register of Historic Places listings in Little Rock, Arkansas
