= Beaumont station =

Railway station in Beaumont, Texas

Beaumont, TX
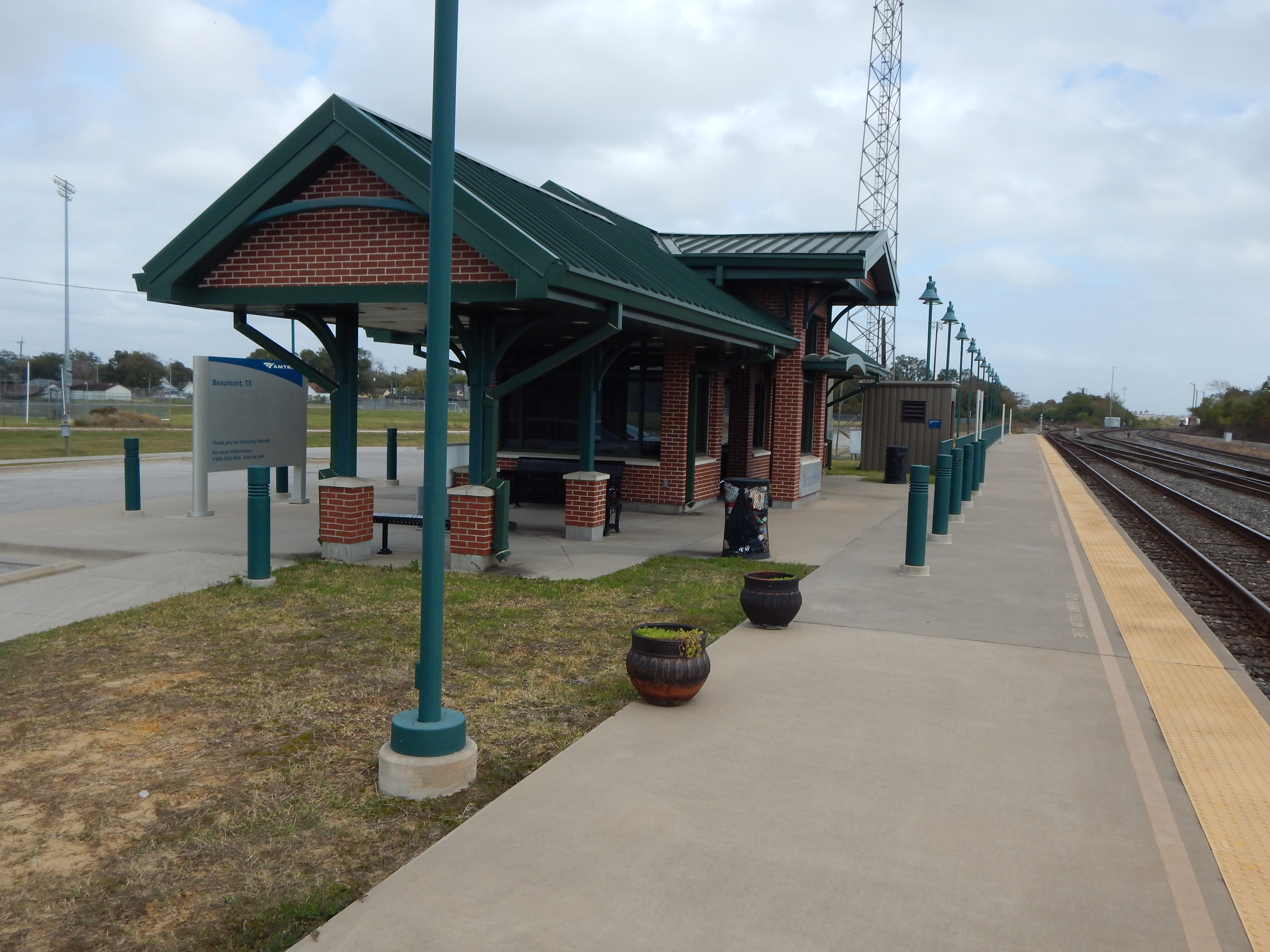
- Beaumont station in November 2015

General information
- Location: 2555 West Cedar Street; Beaumont, Texas; United States
- Coordinates: 30°04′35″N 94°07′39″W
- Owner: City of Beaumont
- Line: UP Lafayette Subdivision
- Platforms: 1 side platform
- Tracks: 2
- Connections: Beaumont Municipal Transit System

Construction
- Parking: 25 long term and 4 short term parking spaces
- Accessible: Yes

Other information
- Station code: Amtrak: BMT

History
- Rebuilt: 2012

Passengers
- FY 2025: 3,225 (Amtrak)

Services
Preceding station	Amtrak	Following station
Houston toward Los Angeles	Sunset Limited	Lake Charles toward New Orleans
Former services
Preceding station	Southern Pacific Railroad	Following station
Houston toward Los Angeles	Sunset Route	Lake Charles toward New Orleans
Location

Beaumont station is an Amtrak station in Beaumont, Texas, served by the Sunset Limited.

== History ==
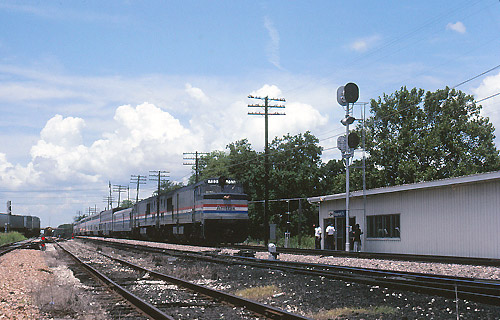
The Sunset Limited at Beaumont in 1982

The current station building and adjacent police substation were constructed in 2012 and opened on September 14 of that year. An earlier station building on the site sustained damage in Hurricane Rita in 2005. That building was removed and only a concrete platform was left for six years until the current replacement station was built. A portion of the construction funds for the current station was from $1.2 million in federal stimulus funding. Work was completed in January, 2012. The station is constructed of red brick and has an enclosed waiting room. A 550-foot (170 m) platform was also constructed.

The city of Beaumont built a police substation with public restrooms on the site adjacent to the current train station at the same time.
