= Lake Charles station =

Train station in Lake Charles, Louisiana, US

Lake Charles, LA
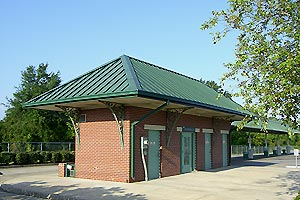
- Lake Charles station in August 2008

General information
- Location: 100 Ryan Street; Lake Charles, Louisiana; United States
- Coordinates: 30°14′17.5″N 93°13′01.5″W
- Owner: City of Lake Charles
- Line: Union Pacific Railroad
- Platforms: 1 side platform
- Tracks: 1
- Connections: Lake Charles Transit

Construction
- Parking: Yes
- Accessible: Yes

Other information
- Station code: Amtrak: LCH

History
- Opened: 1992

Passengers
- FY 2025: 3,656 (Amtrak)

Services
Preceding station	Amtrak	Following station
Beaumont toward Los Angeles	Sunset Limited	Lafayette toward New Orleans
Former services
Preceding station	Southern Pacific Railroad	Following station
Beaumont toward Los Angeles	Sunset Route	New Iberia toward New Orleans
Location

Lake Charles station is a train station in Lake Charles, Louisiana, United States. It is served tri-weekly by Amtrak's Sunset Limited. It is located on 100 Ryan Street at the west end of South Railroad Avenue. Lake Charles station is a decorative and unstaffed waiting room that serves as a replacement for the original Lake Charles Station once located on South Railroad Avenue between Bilbo and Hodges Streets. The iron brackets supporting the station's roof were salvaged from the original Southern Pacific passenger station which served as the Amtrak station.
