= Fayette Township =

Fayette Township may refer to:

- Fayette Township, Livingston County, Illinois
- Fayette Township, Vigo County, Indiana
- Fayette Township, Decatur County, Iowa
- Fayette Township, Linn County, Iowa
- Fayette Township, Michigan
- Fayette Township, Lawrence County, Ohio
- Fayette Township, Pennsylvania

== See also ==
- Lafayette Township (disambiguation)
