= Lafayette, Wisconsin =

Lafayette is the name of some places in the U.S. state of Wisconsin:

- Lafayette County, Wisconsin
- Lafayette, Chippewa County, Wisconsin, a town
- Lafayette, Monroe County, Wisconsin, a town
- Lafayette, Walworth County, Wisconsin, a town
- Fayette, Wisconsin, a town in Lafayette County, Wisconsin
  - Fayette (community), Wisconsin, an unincorporated community
