= Lafayette station (Louisiana) =

Train station in Lafayette, Louisiana, US

Lafayette, LA
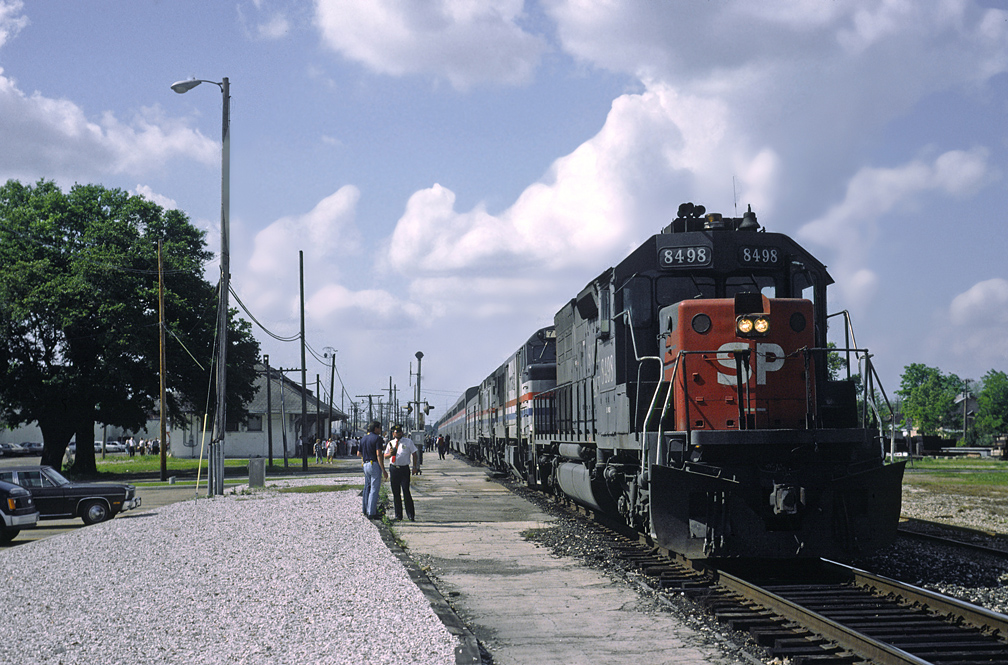
- A Southern Pacific locomotive leads the Sunset Limited into Lafayette, 1989

General information
- Location: 133 East Grant Street; Lafayette, Louisiana; United States
- Coordinates: 30.2267°N 92.0144°W
- Owner: City of Lafayette
- Line: BNSF/UP Lafayette Subdivision
- Platforms: 1 side platform
- Tracks: 1

Construction
- Accessible: Yes

Other information
- Station code: Amtrak: LFT

History
- Opened: 1911–1912
- Rebuilt: 2002

Passengers
- FY 2025: 5,169 (Amtrak)

Services
Preceding station	Amtrak	Following station
Lake Charles toward Los Angeles	Sunset Limited	New Iberia toward New Orleans
Location

Lafayette station is a train station in Lafayette, Louisiana, United States. It is served by the Sunset Limited, operated by Amtrak, the national railroad passenger system.

The Lafayette station was originally built by the Texas and New Orleans Railroad in either 1911 or 1912, but burned in a fire and was abandoned on May 11, 2001. Completed in 2007, the $11 million restoration of the station was funded through the city government, Federal Transit Administration and the Louisiana Department of Transportation and Development, and included work on the exterior walls and platform canopy. The depot now houses a city transit office, waiting room for bus and Amtrak passengers and the office for the city-parish Traffic and Transportation Department.
