= Lafayette Theatre =

Lafayette Theatre may refer to:

- Lafayette Theatre (Suffern), in Suffern, Rockland County, New York, United States
- Lafayette Theatre (Harlem), in Harlem, Manhattan, New York City, New York, United States
- Lafayette Circus (Manhattan), Manhattan, New York City, New York, United States, built in 1825, destroyed by fire in 1829
