= Fayette (given name) =

Fayette is an almost-exclusively masculine given name which may refer to:

== Men ==
- Fayette P. Arnold (died 1872), American politician
- Fayette S. Dunn (1903–1979), president and chairman of the board of the Otis Elevator Company
- Fayette F. Forbes (1851–1935), American water engineer, plant collector and botanist
- Fayette Hewitt (1831–1909), American educator, postmaster, Confederate captain, Kentucky State Auditor and financier
- Fayette Avery McKenzie (1872–1957), American educator and president of Fisk University
- Fayette S. Munro (1874–1921), American lawyer and politician
- Fayette Smith (1830–1867), mayor of Dallas, Texas
- Fayette Bartholomew Tower (1817–1857), American civil engineer and mayor

== Women ==
- Fayette Pinkney (1948–2009), American singer, an original member of the trio The Three Degrees

== See also ==
- Lafayette (name)
