= Fayette station (Iowa) =

Railway depot in Fayette, Iowa

Fayette

General information
- Location: Jade Road, Fayette, Iowa 52412
- System: Former Milwaukee Road passenger rail station

Services
Preceding station	Milwaukee Road	Following station
Arlington toward Cedar Rapids	Cedar Rapids – Calmar	Strawberry Point toward Calmar
- Chicago, Milwaukee, St. Paul and Pacific Railroad Company Depot
- U.S. National Register of Historic Places
- Location within Iowa Location within the United States
- Location: Northeast of Fayette off Iowa Highway 150
- Coordinates: 42°52′0.92″N 91°47′5.23″W
- Area: less than one acre
- Built: 1874
- NRHP reference No.: 78001219
- Added to NRHP: December 28, 1978
Location

The Chicago, Milwaukee, St. Paul and Pacific Railroad Company Depot, also known as Fayette Depot, is a historic building located northeast of Fayette, Iowa, United States. The Chicago, Milwaukee, St. Paul and Pacific Railroad reached Fayette in 1874 and this depot was built at that time to serve as a combination passenger and freight station. It was hoped that a rail station in centrally located Fayette would mean the city would become the county seat for Fayette County, but West Union to the north got the designation instead. The single-story frame structure has a bay window to give the telegraph operator a view up and down the tracks. An addition was constructed in 1913. It served as the community's rail depot well into the 20th century. It was moved to its current location in the Volga River State Recreation Area. The building was listed on the National Register of Historic Places in 1978.
