= Fayetteville =

Fayetteville commonly refers to:

- Fayetteville, Arkansas, the county seat of Washington County
  - The Fayetteville Formation
- Fayetteville, North Carolina, the most populous US city with this name
  - Fayetteville rifle, a Confederate firearm muskets namesake from Fayetteville Arsenal

Fayetteville may also refer to:

- Fayetteville, Alabama
- Fayetteville, Georgia
- Fayetteville, Illinois
- Fayetteville, Indiana
- Fayetteville, Washington County, Indiana
- Fayetteville, Missouri
- Fayetteville, New York
- Fayetteville, Ohio
- Fayetteville, Pennsylvania
- Fayetteville, Tennessee
- Fayetteville, Texas
- Fayetteville, West Virginia
- Fayetteville Township, Washington County, Arkansas, conterminous with the city above
- Fayetteville Township, St. Clair County, Illinois

== See also ==
- Fayette (disambiguation)
- Lafayette (disambiguation)
- Marquis de Lafayette, after whom most places are named
