= Lafayette Building (Detroit) =

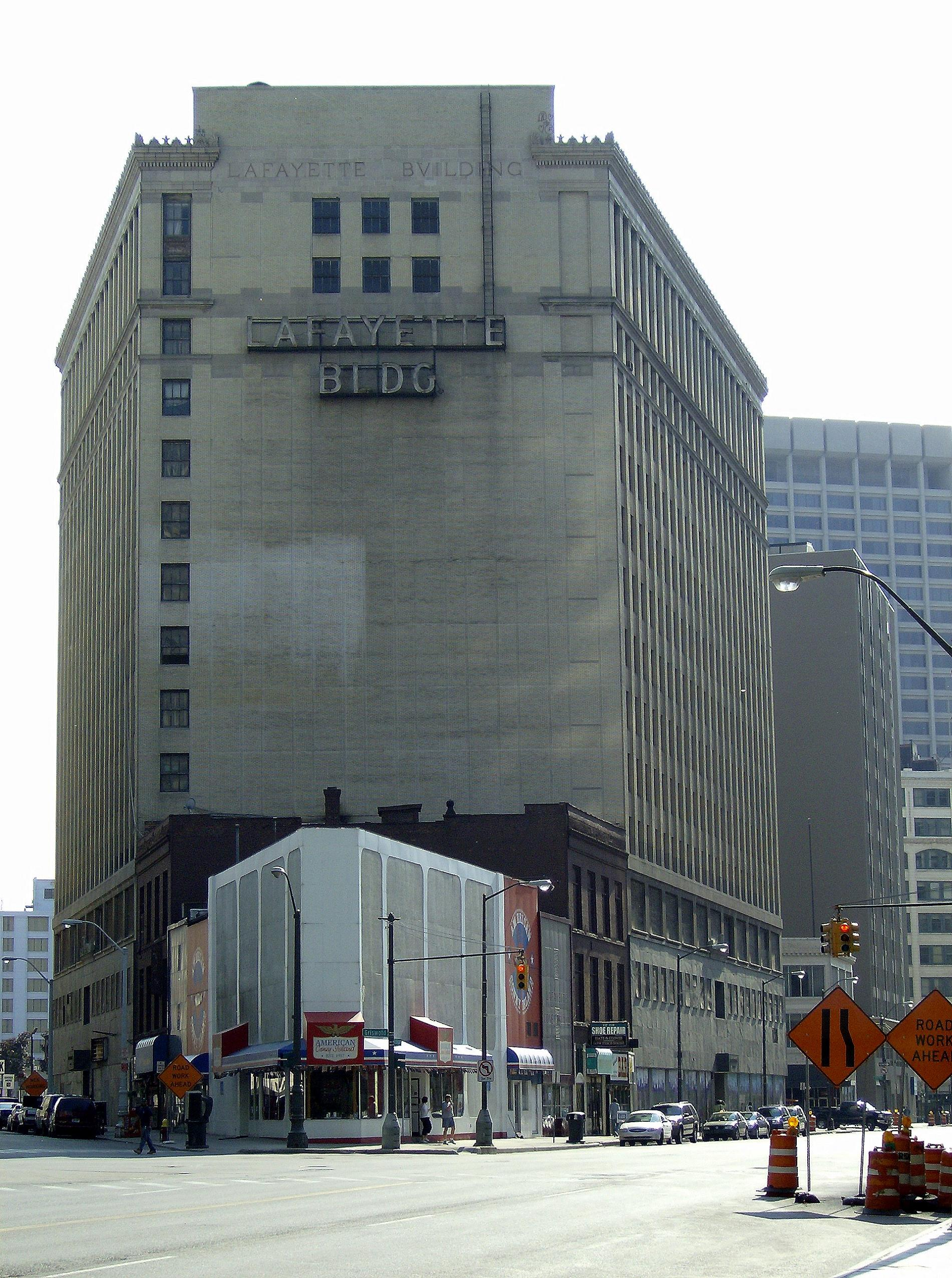
- Interactive map of the Lafayette Building area

General information
- Status: Demolished
- Location: 144 West Lafayette Boulevard, Detroit, Michigan, United States
- Coordinates: 42.33143°N 83.04879°W
- Completed: 1923
- Demolished: October 12, 2009-February 24, 2010

Height
- Roof: 55.5 m (182 ft)

Technical details
- Floor count: 14

Design and construction
- Architects: Charles Howard Crane; Elmer George Kiehler

The Lafayette Building was a high-rise office building located at 144 West Lafayette Boulevard in downtown Detroit, Michigan. It was built in 1923 and occupied a triangular lot, bordered by Michigan Avenue, West Lafayette Boulevard, and Shelby Street. The building was 14 floors tall, with one basement floor, and 13 above-ground floors. The office building was designed in the neo-classical architecture style by C. Howard Crane who built many of Detroit's theaters. It is built with mainly brick, limestone, and terra cotta. Its triangular form mimicked the Flatiron Building in Manhattan.

The building contained 178 feet (54 m) of frontage along Michigan Avenue, 168 feet (51 m) of frontage along Shelby Street, 135 feet (41 m) of frontage along Lafayette Boulevard, and was 85 feet (26 m) in length along its east facade which stood mid-block. After years of mismanagement, and a declining tenant base, the building was finally shuttered in 1997. Demolition of the building began in October 2009 and ended at 4:30 AM on February 24, 2010, when the last part of the 14-story tower was leveled to the ground.

== History ==
In the 1970s and 1980s, the Michigan Supreme Court, the Supreme Court Administrator's Office, the Michigan Judicial Tenure Commission and parts of the 36th District Court of Detroit had space in the building.

Preservationists unsuccessfully tried to place the Lafayette Building on the National Register of Historic Places. They were unable also to secure tax credits or find a purchaser. In a cruel irony (for preservationists), it was said that efforts to preserve the Book-Cadillac Hotel dissipated support and contributed to its demolition.

== Redevelopment plans ==
The Peebles Atlantic Development Corporation announced on December 15, 2005, that it planned to convert the Lafayette into one of Detroit's premier condominium buildings at a cost of more than $40 million. The residential conversion would have included refurbishing the historical exterior and the interior, which would have included 125 modern units with upscale amenities such as a fitness center and ground floor commercial space. The renovation of this building was slated to start in the summer of 2006 with a completion sometime in the summer of 2007. However, the developer failed to come through with the money and the building remained abandoned.

The Ferchill Group, which developed the Westin Book Cadillac, and Dan Gilbert of Quicken Loans were touted as possible saviors. However, they bowed out, citing prohibitive cost of renovation. However, some critics said that money spent on demolition should have been used to secure the building and remove graffiti. "Their solution was like saying, 'Oh my God, there's a fly on the wall. Quick, grab the sledgehammer.'"

On November 13, 2007, the City of Detroit offered Quicken Loans the Lafayette Building for $1 as part of their major redevelopment of downtown Detroit. Quicken had a year to choose the site of their headquarters (Hudson or Statler/Tuller Blocks) and to study the redevelopment of two parking lots on Library and Broadway and the Lafayette Building. If redeveloped, the two parking lots and the Lafayette Building were to become a mixed-use building of retail, offices, and residential space. Plans fell through when Quicken decided to relocate only a portion of its staff downtown into the Compuware Building. On December 9, 2008, the City of Detroit issued a request for environmental consulting services to prepare for the demolition of the building.

== Demolition ==
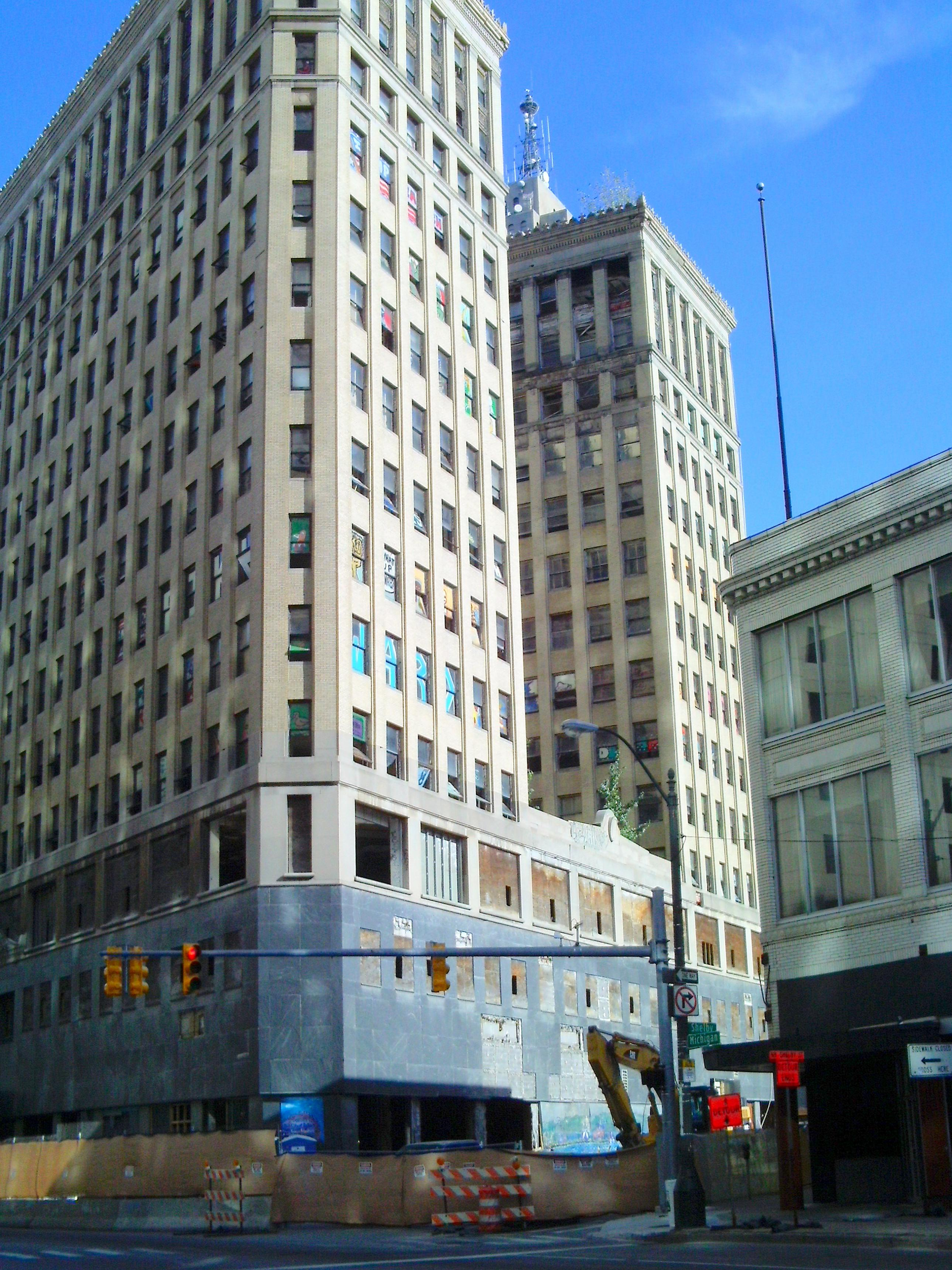
Demolition barricades around street level in autumn 2009.

On March 26, 2009, the Detroit Economic Growth Corporation announced it was seeking bids to demolish the Lafayette Building. Despite earlier redevelopment plans, the building remained vacant for more than a decade and was heavily vandalized and neglected; trees were even growing from its roof. Bids for the demolition work were due by early April 2009. However, shortly after the deadline came, Detroit Mayor Kenneth Cockrel, Jr. canceled demolition plans due to a public outcry to save the landmark. The future for the Lafayette Building was still uncertain, as this was a temporary halt.

On June 25, 2009, Detroit's Downtown Development Authority voted unanimously to destroy the Lafayette Building. The DDA voted to give the demolition contract to Detroit-based Adamo Demolition. for a lump sum amount of $1,445,888, according to an article in the Detroit Free Press.

On July 12, 2009, it was disclosed in the Detroit newspapers that local developer Dionysia Properties LLC, which has developed six loft projects around the city in recent years, had asked Detroit city officials to give it two weeks to conduct a structural inspection of the Lafayette Building in hopes of saving it. But, on August 15, 2009, it was announced that Dionysia Properties LLC failed to obtain a reprieve for the Lafayette Building, and demolition moved forward.

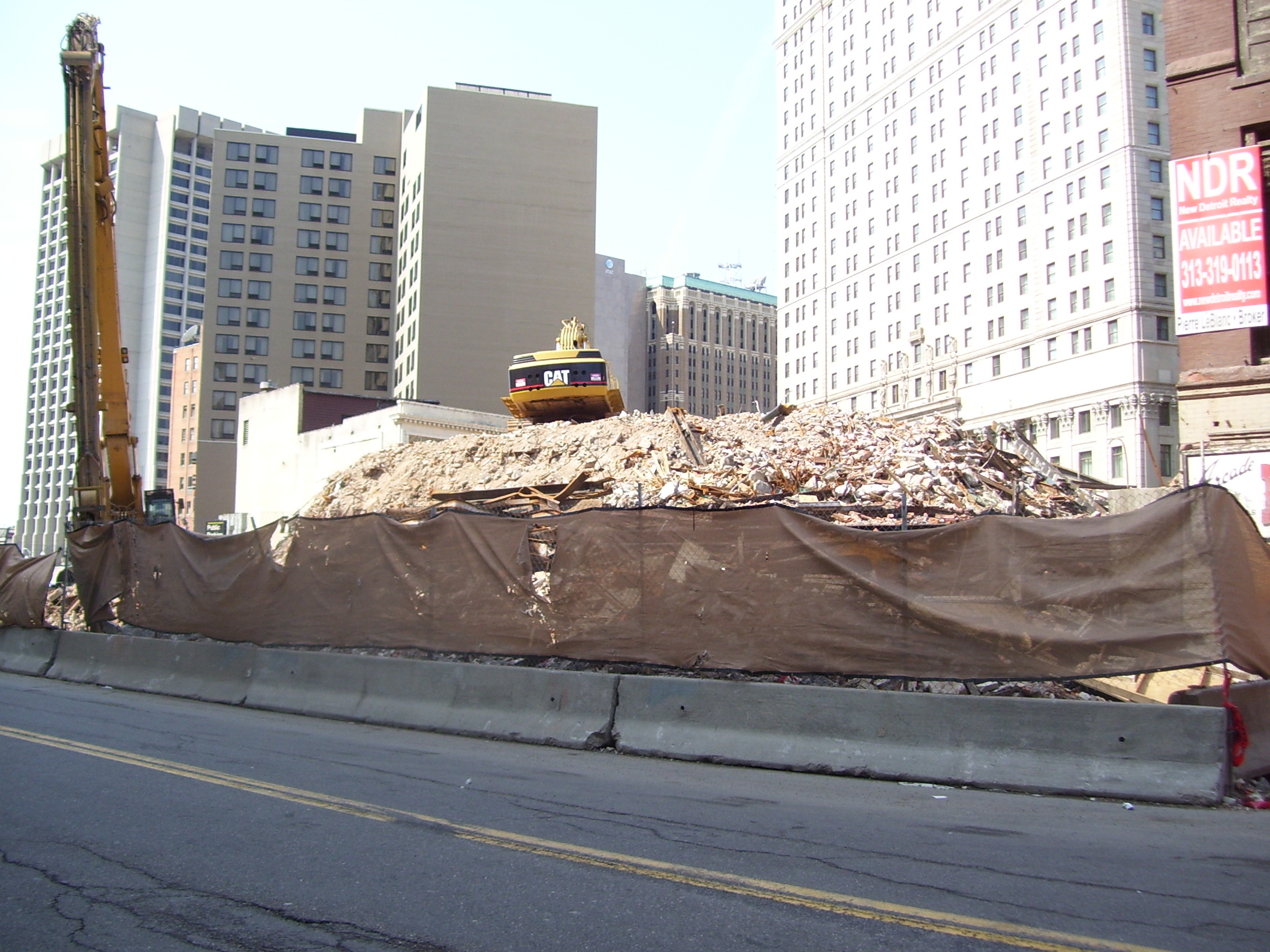
The pile of rubble that used to be the Lafayette Building.

Demolition started on October 12, 2009. Demolition proceeded slowly throughout November and December 2009 and January 2010. On February 24, 2010, at 4:30 AM EST, the east tower of the 14-story portion of the building was leveled to the ground when it twisted towards the north and then collapsed resulting in smoke blanketing the surrounding block. The only remaining portion of the building is a pile of rubble.

Demolition is completed. The site will become a pocket park with grass & landscaping until future development takes its place. The historic Lafayette and American Coney Island restaurants were not affected by the demolition.

== References and further reading ==
- Hill, Eric J.; John Gallagher (2002). AIA Detroit: The American Institute of Architects Guide to Detroit Architecture. Wayne State University Press. ISBN 0-8143-3120-3.
- Meyer, Katherine Mattingly and Martin C.P. McElroy with Introduction by W. Hawkins Ferry, Hon A.I.A. (1980). Detroit Architecture A.I.A. Guide Revised Edition. Wayne State University Press. ISBN 0-8143-1651-4.
