= Lafayette Township, Kansas =

Lafayette Township
- Township
- Location in Chautauqua County
- Coordinates: 37°14′30″N 096°09′51″W
- Country: United States
- State: Kansas
- County: Chautauqua

Area
  - Total: 60.2 sq mi (155.9 km^{2})
  - Land: 59.35 sq mi (153.71 km^{2})
  - Water: 0.85 sq mi (2.19 km^{2}) 1.4%
- Elevation: 978 ft (298 m)

Population (2020)
  - Total: 27
  - Density: 0.52/sq mi (0.2/km^{2})
- GNIS feature ID: 0469523

Lafayette Township is a township in Chautauqua County, Kansas, United States. As of the 2020 census, its population was 27.

== Geography ==
Lafayette Township covers an area of 60.19 square miles (155.9 km^{2}) and contains no incorporated settlements. According to the USGS, it contains three cemeteries: Crum, Saint Charles and Union Chapel.

The streams of Bachelor Creek, Broker Creek, Coon Creek, Coon Creek, North Salt Creek and Turkey Creek run through this township.
