= LaFayette, Kentucky =

- City
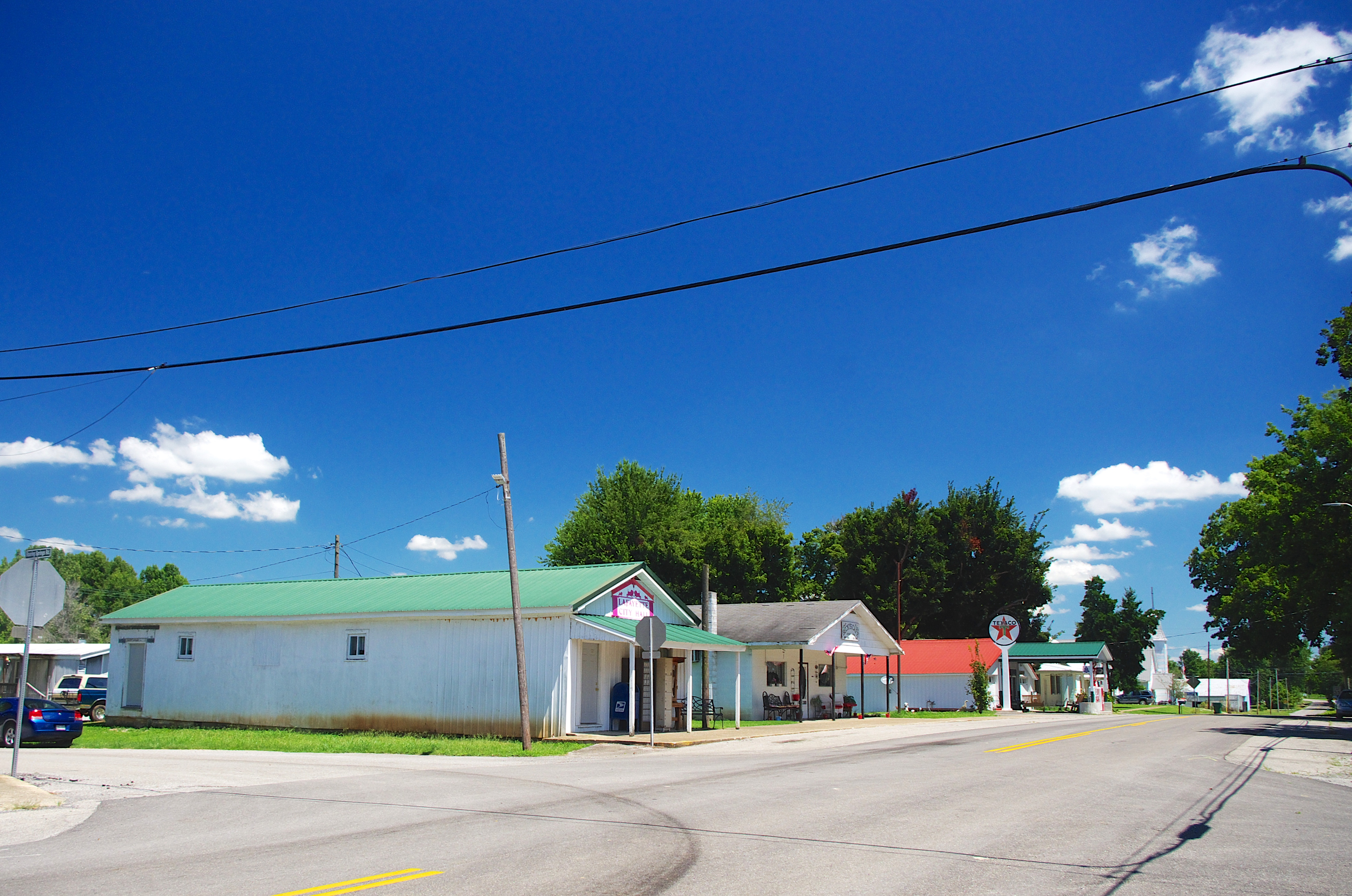
- KY 107 in LaFayette

- Location of LaFayette in Christian County, Kentucky.
- Coordinates: 36°39′37″N 87°39′29″W
- Country: United States
- State: Kentucky
- County: Christian
- Incorporated: 1836

Government
  - Mayor: Jared Thatcher

Area
  - Total: 0.26 sq mi (0.67 km^{2})
  - Land: 0.26 sq mi (0.67 km^{2})
  - Water: 0 sq mi (0.00 km^{2})
- Elevation: 597 ft (182 m)

Population (2020)
  - Total: 177
  - Density: 686.3/sq mi (264.97/km^{2})
- Time zone: UTC-6 (Central (CST))
  - Summer (DST): UTC-5 (CDT)
- ZIP code: 42254
- Area codes: 270 & 364
- FIPS code: 21-43444
- GNIS feature ID: 0508413

LaFayette, also informally written as La Fayette and Lafayette, is a home rule-class city in Christian County, Kentucky, in the United States. The population was 177 as of the 2020 census, up from 165 in the 2010 U.S. census.

== History ==
LaFayette was first settled in the late 1810s, and by 1820 was home to a dry goods and grocery store. It was formally incorporated by the state assembly in 1836. The city was named in honor of Revolutionary War hero the Marquis de Lafayette.

LaFayette is home to an antebellum church, the Lafayette Methodist Church. Built in 1852 by Dutch-born builder Daniel Umbenhour, the church is now listed on the National Register of Historic Places.

== Geography ==
LaFayette is located along Kentucky Route 107 in the southwestern corner of Christian County, 18 miles (29 km) southwest of Hopkinsville, the Christian County seat, and 2 miles (3 km) north of the Tennessee state line. The town lies just north of the US Army's Fort Campbell.

According to the United States Census Bureau, the town has a total area of 0.2 square miles (0.6 km^{2}), all land.

== Demographics ==
Historical population
Census	Pop.	Note	%±
1870	215		—
1880	970		351.2%
1890	215		−77.8%
1900	199		−7.4%
1910	266		33.7%
1920	307		15.4%
1930	227		−26.1%
1940	229		0.9%
1950	246		7.4%
1960	196		−20.3%
1970	158		−19.4%
1980	160		1.3%
1990	106		−33.7%
2000	193		82.1%
2010	165		−14.5%
2020	177		7.3%
U.S. Decennial Census

As of the census of 2000, there were 193 people, 75 households, and 51 families residing in the town. The population density was 718.7 inhabitants per square mile (277.5/km^{2}). There were 83 housing units at an average density of 309.1 per square mile (119.3/km^{2}). The racial makeup of the town was 89.12% White, 5.70% African American, 0.52% Native American or Alaska Native, 1.55% Asian, 1.04% from other races, and 2.07% from two or more races. Hispanics or Latinos of any race were 1.55% of the population.

There were 75 households, out of which 33.3% had children under the age of 18 living with them, 64.0% were married couples living together, 2.7% had a female householder with no husband present, and 32.0% were non-families. 29.3% of all households were made up of individuals, and 10.7% had someone living alone who was 65 years of age or older. The average household size was 2.57 and the average family size was 3.22.

The age distribution was 29.0% under the age of 18, 6.2% from 18 to 24, 34.7% from 25 to 44, 20.7% from 45 to 64, and 9.3% who were 65 years of age or older. The median age was 33 years. For every 100 females, there were 116.9 males. For every 100 females age 18 and over, there were 124.6 males.

The median income for a household in the town was $28,906, and the median income for a family was $30,250. Males had a median income of $25,000 versus $29,375 for females. The per capita income for the town was $11,679. About 9.8% of families and 13.9% of the population were below the poverty line, including 13.3% of those under the age of eighteen and 40.0% of those 65 or over.
