= Lafayette Township, Allamakee County, Iowa =

Township in Iowa, US

Lafayette Township, Allamakee County
- Township
- Coordinates: 43°17′40″N 091°10′27″W
- Country: United States
- State: Iowa
- County: Allamakee

Area
  - Total: 45.84 sq mi (118.73 km^{2})
  - Land: 43.39 sq mi (112.38 km^{2})
  - Water: 2.45 sq mi (6.35 km^{2})
- Elevation: 1,010 ft (308 m)

Population (2010)
  - Total: 421
  - Density: 9.6/sq mi (3.7/km^{2})
- Time zone: UTC-6 (CST)
  - Summer (DST): UTC-5 (CDT)
- FIPS code: 19-92331
- GNIS feature ID: 0468173

Lafayette Township is one of eighteen townships in Allamakee County, Iowa, USA. At the 2010 census, its population was 421.

== History ==
Lafayette Township was organized in 1852.

== Geography ==
Lafayette Township covers an area of 45.84 square miles (118.7 km^{2}) and contains no incorporated settlements. According to the USGS, it contains three cemeteries: Thompson Corner, Village Creek and Wexford.
