= LaFayette Hotel =

- U.S. National Register of Historic Places
- U.S. Historic district – Contributing property
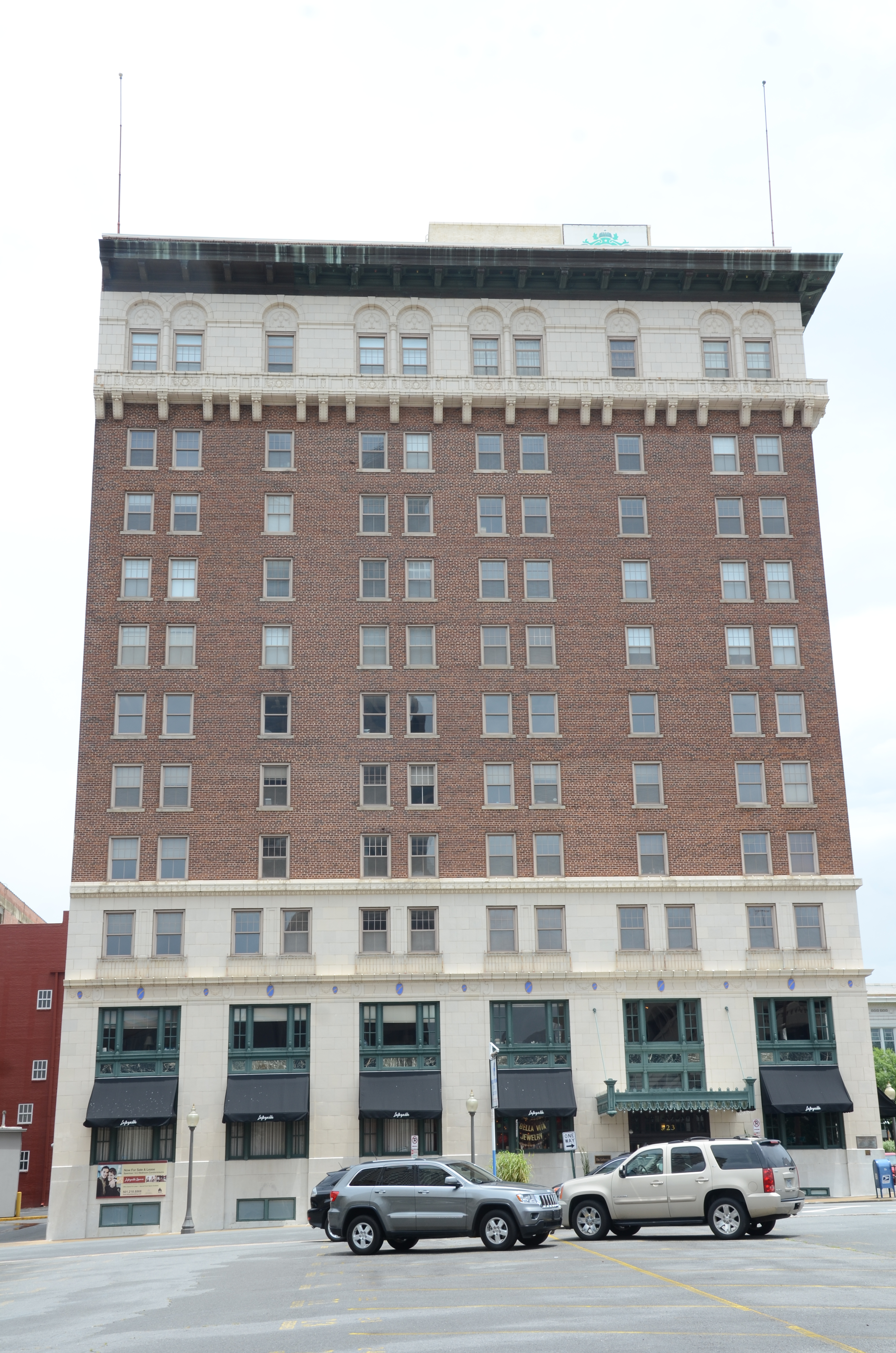

- Location within Arkansas Location within the United States
- Location: 523 S. Louisiana St., Little Rock, Arkansas
- Coordinates: 34°44′36″N 92°16′20″W
- Area: less than one acre
- Built: 1925
- Architect: George D. Barnett
- Part of: Capitol-Main Historic District (ID11001050)
- NRHP reference No.: 82002128

Significant dates
- Added to NRHP: September 30, 1982
- Designated CP: April 2, 2012

The former LaFayette Hotel is a historic commercial building at 525 South Louisiana Street in downtown Little Rock, Arkansas. It is a twelve-story concrete structure, faced primarily in brick. It has a rectangular footprint at its base, with an L-shaped tower facing the street fronts of South Louisiana and Sixth Street. Its facades are decorated with terra cotta panels, and it is crowned by a pressed metal cornice. Its main entrances are marked by projecting marquees of cast iron. The hotel was designed by St. Louis architect George Barnett and was built in 1925. The hotel operated until 1933, opening again after World War II until closing in 1973.

The building was listed on the National Register of Historic Places in 1982.

== See also ==
- National Register of Historic Places listings in Little Rock, Arkansas
