= Lafayette Township, Story County, Iowa =

Lafayette Township
- Township
- Location in Story County
- Coordinates: 42°09′58″N 093°38′23″W
- Country: United States
- State: Iowa
- County: Story

Area
  - Total: 35.8 sq mi (93 km^{2})
  - Land: 35.8 sq mi (93 km^{2})
  - Water: 0.0 sq mi (0 km^{2}) 0.0%
- Elevation: 1,010 ft (310 m)

Population (2000)
  - Total: 3,523
  - Density: 98/sq mi (38/km^{2})
- ZIP Code: 50248
- Area code: 515

Lafayette Township is a township in Story County, Iowa, USA. As of the 2000 census, its population was 3523.

== Geography ==
Lafayette Township covers an area of 35.8 square miles (93 km^{2}) and contains the incorporated town of Story City. According to the USGS, it contains three cemeteries: Fairview Cemetery, Sowers Cemetery and South Saint Petri Cemetery.

U.S. Route 69 runs north and south through the township and County Roads E18 and E15 run east–west.
