= Fayette County =

Fayette County may refer to various counties in the United States, each named for the Marquis de Lafayette, a Frenchman who served in the American Revolution:

- Fayette County, Alabama
- Fayette County, Georgia
- Fayette County, Illinois
- Fayette County, Indiana
- Fayette County, Iowa
- Fayette County, Kentucky
- Fayette County, Ohio
- Fayette County, Pennsylvania
- Fayette County, Tennessee
- Fayette County, Texas
- Fayette County, Virginia, has existed twice; the two counties continue in existence as Fayette County, Kentucky, and Fayette County, West Virginia
- Fayette County, West Virginia

== See also ==
- Lafayette County (disambiguation)
