= USS Lafayette =

Three ships in the United States Navy have been named USS Lafayette for Marquis de Lafayette.

- USS Lafayette (1848), was built in 1848 as Aleck Scott, and purchased by the US Navy on 18 May 1862 and renamed Lafayette on 8 September 1862. She was decommissioned in July 1865 and sold
- USS Lafayette (AP-53), was launched as the French-built Normandie and seized from France in 1941. She was partially destroyed by fire during conversion to a troop ship in New York. She was sold to a US scrap merchant and then struck in 1945
- USS Lafayette (SSBN-616), was the lead ship of the Lafayette-class submarines, commissioned in 1963, and decommissioned in 1991
- USS Lafayette (FFG-65), a cancelled Constellation-class frigate
