= SS Lafayette (1900) =

Great Lakes bulk freighter that sank in Lake Superior

Coordinates: 47°5′41.7″N 91°32′57.66″W

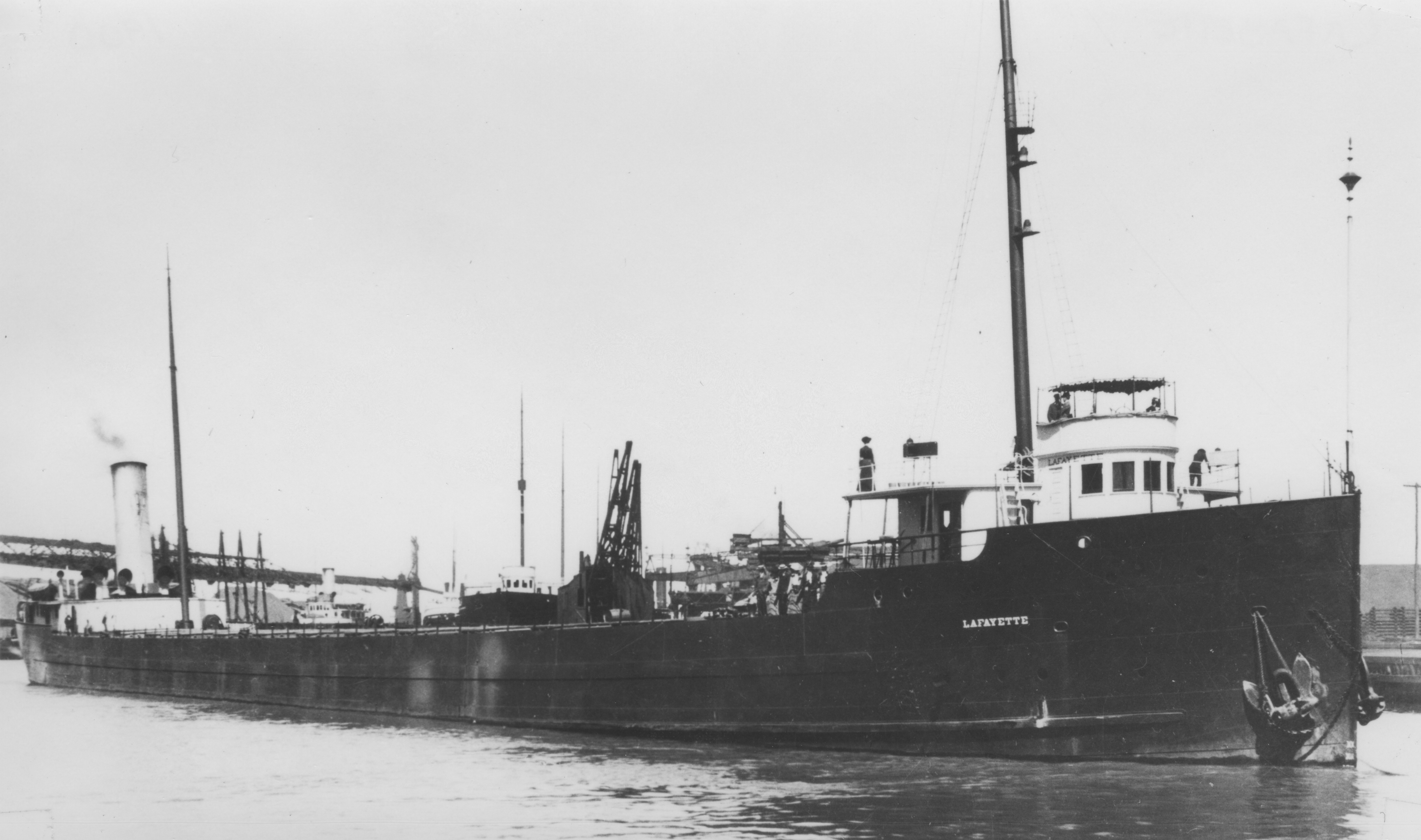
- Lafayette before she sank

History

United States
- Name: Lafayette
- Operator: Pittsburgh Steamship Company
- Builder: American Ship Building Company, Lorain, Ohio
- Yard number: 301
- Completed: 1900
- In service: 1900
- Out of service: 1905
- Identification: US official number 141657
- Fate: Broke up in the 1905 Mataafa Storm on 28 November 1905

General characteristics
- Type: bulk carrier
- Tonnage: 5,113 GRT, 3,827 NRT
- Length: 454 ft (138 m)
- Beam: 50 ft (15 m)
- Height: 28.48 ft (8.68 m)
- Installed power: 2 x Scotch marine boilers
- Propulsion: Triple expansion steam engine
- Crew: 29

SS Lafayette was a 454-foot (138 m) long Great Lakes bulk carrier that broke in two in the Mataafa Storm of 1905 near Encampment Island, Two Harbors, Minnesota. She was part of the "College Line" of ships; a group of five completely identical vessels named after the colleges attended by five of Pittsburgh Steamship's executives. Lafayette's sister ships were: Harvard, Cornell, Princeton, and the Rensselaer.

Lafayette was sailing with her barge Manilla, which crashed into her when she ran ashore. The waves caused the ship to break in two, the stern stayed on the rocks, while the bow was pounded to pieces by the waters of Lake Superior. One life was lost. The ship was declared a total loss (the cost of the ship was about $300,000). The stern of Lafayette was used in 1909 to build the steamer J.S. Ashley.
