= Lafayette Township, Bremer County, Iowa =

Township in Iowa, US

Lafayette Township, Bremer County
- Township
- Coordinates: 42°47′06″N 092°29′13″W
- Country: United States
- State: Iowa
- County: Bremer

Area
  - Total: 30.13 sq mi (78.04 km^{2})
  - Land: 30.10 sq mi (77.95 km^{2})
  - Water: 0.035 sq mi (0.09 km^{2})
- Elevation: 1,007 ft (307 m)

Population (2010)
  - Total: 618
  - Density: 20/sq mi (7.9/km^{2})
- Time zone: UTC-6 (Central)
  - Summer (DST): UTC-5 (Central)
- FIPS code: 19-92334
- GNIS feature ID: 0468174

Lafayette Township is one of fourteen townships in Bremer County, Iowa, United States. At the 2010 census, its population was 618.

== Geography ==
Lafayette Township covers an area of 30.13 square miles (78.0 km^{2}) and contains no incorporated settlements. According to the USGS, it contains two cemeteries: Andrews and Spring Lake.
