= Lafayette Park =

Lafayette Park may refer to:

- Lafayette Park (Los Angeles), California
- Lafayette Park (San Francisco), California
- Lafayette Park, Detroit, Michigan, a park, development, and neighborhood
- Lafayette Park, St. Louis, Missouri, surrounded by Lafayette Square
- Lafayette Park Historic District, Albany, New York
- Lafayette Park, Norfolk, Virginia, adjacent to the Virginia Zoological Park
- Lafayette Square, Washington, D.C., the northern part of President's Park in Washington, D.C.
