= Lafayette County =

Lafayette County may refer to the following counties locations in the United States:

- Lafayette County, Arkansas
- Lafayette County, Florida
- Lafayette County, Mississippi
- Lafayette County, Missouri
- Lafayette County, Wisconsin

== See also ==
- Fayette County (disambiguation)
- Lafayette Parish, Louisiana
