= Fayette Township, Livingston County, Illinois =

Coordinates: 40°38′54″N 88°24′00″W

Fayette Township
- Township
- Location in Livingston County

- Livingston County's location in Illinois
- Country: United States
- State: Illinois
- County: Livingston
- Established: February 22, 1870

Area
  - Total: 22.71 sq mi (58.8 km^{2})
  - Land: 22.68 sq mi (58.7 km^{2})
  - Water: 0.03 sq mi (0.078 km^{2}) 0.14%

Population (2020)
  - Total: 246
  - Density: 10.8/sq mi (4.19/km^{2})
- Time zone: UTC-6 (CST)
  - Summer (DST): UTC-5 (CDT)
- FIPS code: 17-105-25700

Fayette Township is located in Livingston County, Illinois. As of the 2020 census, its population was 246 and it contained 97 housing units. Fayette Township formed from Belle Prairie Township on February 22, 1870.

== Geography ==
According to the 2021 census gazetteer files, Fayette Township has a total area of 22.71 square miles (58.82 km^{2}), of which 22.68 square miles (58.74 km^{2}) (or 99.86%) is land and 0.03 square miles (0.08 km^{2}) (or 0.14%) is water.

== Demographics ==
As of the 2020 census there were 246 people, 69 households, and 52 families residing in the township. The population density was 10.83 inhabitants per square mile (4.18/km^{2}). There were 97 housing units at an average density of 4.27 per square mile (1.65/km^{2}). The racial makeup of the township was 91.46% White, 0.81% African American, 0.00% Native American, 0.81% Asian, 0.41% Pacific Islander, 2.85% from other races, and 3.66% from two or more races. Hispanic or Latino of any race were 4.47% of the population.

There were 69 households, out of which 27.50% had children under the age of 18 living with them, 69.57% were married couples living together, 2.90% had a female householder with no spouse present, and 24.64% were non-families. 21.70% of all households were made up of individuals, and none had someone living alone who was 65 years of age or older. The average household size was 2.55 and the average family size was 2.98.

The township's age distribution consisted of 18.2% under the age of 18, 15.3% from 18 to 24, 23.2% from 25 to 44, 32.4% from 45 to 64, and 10.8% who were 65 years of age or older. The median age was 42.5 years. For every 100 females, there were 107.1 males. For every 100 females age 18 and over, there were 121.5 males.

The median income for a household in the township was $106,250, and the median income for a family was $137,500. Males had a median income of $48,942 versus $21,250 for females. The per capita income for the township was $39,460. About 7.7% of families and 13.1% of the population were below the poverty line, including 34.4% of those under age 18 and 0.0% of those age 65 or over.

Historical population
Census	Pop.	Note	%±
2010	271		—
2020	246		−9.2%
U.S. Decennial Census
