= Lafayette Square =

Lafayette Square may refer to several places in the United States:

- Lafayette Square, Los Angeles, Mid-Wilshire neighborhood of Los Angeles, California
- Lafayette Square (Savannah, Georgia), one of Savannah's 22 city squares
- Lafayette Square Mall, Indianapolis, Indiana
- Lafayette Square (New Orleans), in the Central Business District, New Orleans, Louisiana
- Lafayette Square (Baltimore), Maryland
- Lafayette Square, Cambridge, part of the Central Square area of Cambridge, Massachusetts
- Lafayette Square, St. Louis, a neighborhood in St. Louis, Missouri
  - Lafayette Square Historic District (St. Louis)
- Lafayette Square (Buffalo, New York), New York
  - Lafayette Square station
- Lafayette Square, Washington, D.C., northernmost part of President's Park
  - Lafayette Square Historic District, Washington, D.C., near the White House
