= Amity =

Amity may refer to:

== Places ==
=== United States ===
- Eagar, Arizona, a town, formerly named Amity
- Amity, Arkansas, city in Clark County
- Amity (New Haven), Connecticut, a neighborhood
- Amity, Georgia, an unincorporated community
- Amity, Illinois (disambiguation)
- Amity, Indiana, an unincorporated community
- Amity, Maine, a town
- Amity, Missouri, a village
- Amity, New York, a town
- Amity, Orange County, New York, a hamlet
- Amity, Knox County, Ohio, an unincorporated community
- Amity, Madison County, Ohio, an unincorporated community
- Amity, Montgomery County, Ohio, an unincorporated community
- Amity, Oregon, a city
- Amity, Bucks County, Pennsylvania, an unincorporated community
- Amity, Washington County, Pennsylvania, an unincorporated community
- Amity, Texas, an unincorporated community
- Amity Hills, Oregon, range of hills northeast of Amity
- Amity Township (disambiguation)

=== Australia ===
- Amity, Queensland, a town on North Stradbroke Island, Redland City

== Schools ==
- AEON-Amity, a chain of private English schools in Japan
- Amity College, school in New South Wales, Australia
- Amity High School (disambiguation), several schools
- Amity School, in Lincolnton, Georgia
- Brooklyn Amity School, a private school in Brooklyn, New York, United States
- Amity University (disambiguation), several universities

== Other uses ==
- Amity Blight, character in the Disney animated series The Owl House
- Amity (1801 ship), a merchant ship, Royal Navy sloop and whaler
- Amity (brig), a ship used in Australia in the early nineteenth century
- Amity (given name), a list of people with the name
- Amity, New Farm, a heritage-listed house in Brisbane, Queensland, Australia
- Amity Church Settlement, settlement house in New York City
- Amity Foundation, a charity in China
- Amity Street, Amherst, Massachusetts
- Amity Island, a town and the island in the Jaws franchise
- Amity, one of the five factions in the Divergent series
- Amity, a character from the horror comic series Witch Creek Road

== See also ==
- Amityville (disambiguation)
