= List of cemeteries in Illinois =

This list of cemeteries in Illinois includes currently operating, historical (closed for new interments), and defunct (graves abandoned or removed) cemeteries, columbaria, and mausolea which are historical and/or notable. It does not include pet cemeteries.

== Adams County ==
- Ebenezer Methodist Episcopal Chapel and Cemetery, Golden
- Quincy National Cemetery, Quincy; NRHP-listed
- Woodland Cemetery, Quincy

== Bureau County ==
- Oakland Cemetery, Princeton
- Mound Cemetery

== DuPage County ==
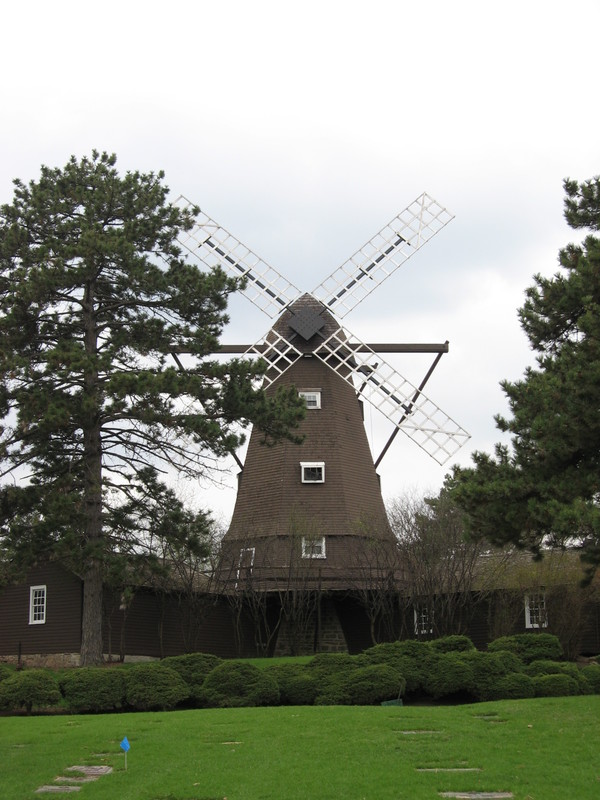
Fischer Windmill, Mount Emblem Cemetery in Elmhurst, Cook County

- Mount Emblem Cemetery, Elmhurst

== Effingham County ==
- Ramsey Cemetery, rural

== Fulton County ==
- Oak Hill Cemetery, Lewistown

== Jackson County ==
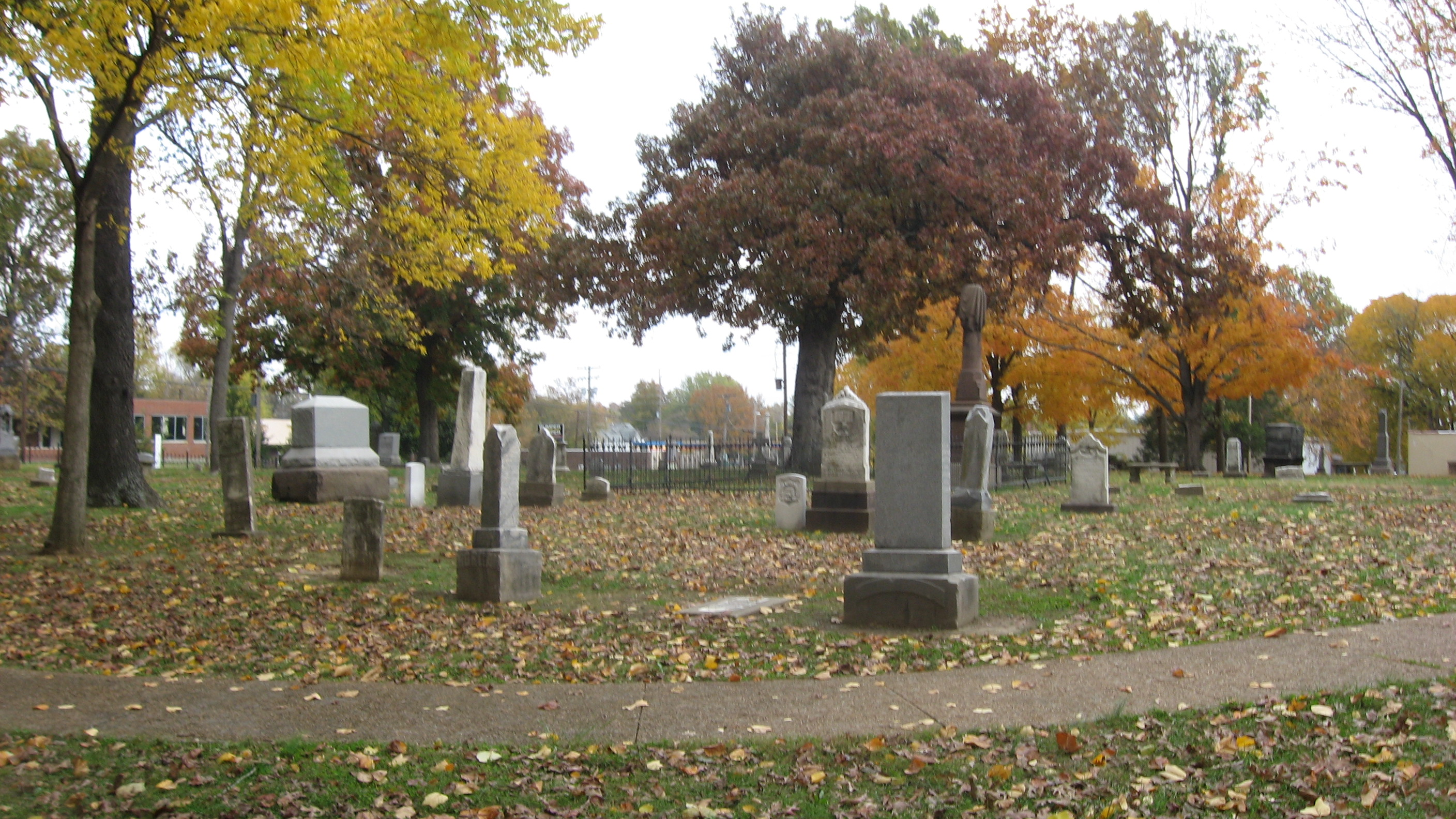
Woodlawn Cemetery in Carbondale, Jackson County

- Woodlawn Cemetery, Carbondale

== Jersey County ==
- Oak Grove Cemetery, Jerseyville

== Jo Daviess County ==
- Greenwood Cemetery, Galena

== Lake County ==
- Lake Forest Cemetery, Lake Forest

== LaSalle County ==
- Ottawa Avenue Cemetery, Ottawa
- Summit View Cemetery, Ottawa

== Livingston County ==
- Bayou Cemetery, Cornell

== Hancock County ==
- Smith Family Cemetery, Nauvoo

== Henderson County ==
- South Henderson Church, Gladstone; NRHP-listed

== Macoupin County ==
- Union Miners Cemetery, Mount Olive; NRHP-listed

== Madison County ==
- Alton National Cemetery, Alton; NRHP-listed
- Sunset Hill Cemetery, Glen Carbon

== McHenry County ==
- Mount Auburn Cemetery, Harvard

== McLean County ==
- Benjaminville Friends Meeting House and Burial Ground, Holder
- Evergreen Cemetery, Bloomington

== Peoria County ==
- Springdale Cemetery, Peoria

== Pulaski County ==
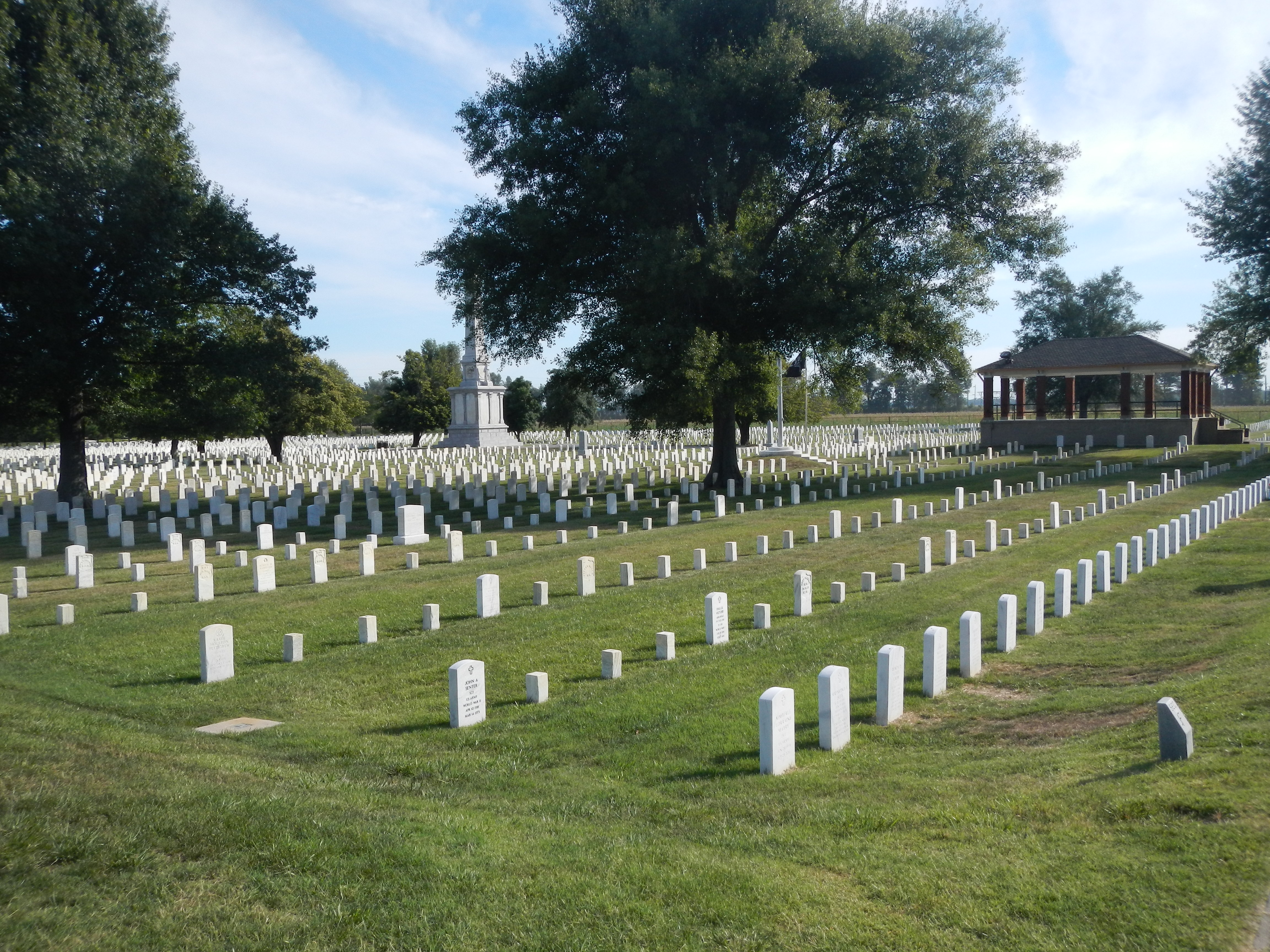
Mound City National Cemetery in Pulaski County

- Mound City National Cemetery, Mound City; NRHP-listed

== Rock Island County ==
- Chippiannock Cemetery, Rock Island
- Riverside Cemetery, Moline
- Rock Island National Cemetery, Rock Island; NRHP-listed

== Sangamon County ==
- Camp Butler National Cemetery, near Springfield; NRHP-listed
- Oak Ridge Cemetery, Springfield

== Union County ==
- Campground Church and Cemetery Site, Anna; NRHP-listed

== Will County ==
- Abraham Lincoln National Cemetery, Elwood

== Winnebago County ==
- Greenwood Cemetery, Rockford

== See also ==
- List of cemeteries in the United States
