= Amity, Ohio =

Amity, Ohio may refer to:

- Amity, Knox County, Ohio, an unincorporated community
- Amity, Madison County, Ohio, an unincorporated community
- Amity, Montgomery County, Ohio, an unincorporated community

== See also ==
- Amity (disambiguation)
