= Rooks Creek =

Rooks Creek may refer to:

- Rooks Creek (Vermilion River tributary), Livingston County, Illinois, USA; a creek
- Rooks Creek, Illinois, USA; a hamlet in Rooks Creek Township, Livingston County
- Rooks Creek Township, Livingston County, Illinois, USA
- Rooks Creek Community Consolidated School District 425, Illinois, USA; see List of school districts in Illinois
- Rook's Creek, Sawtooth National Forest, Idaho, USA

== See also ==
- Rook (disambiguation)
- Creek (disambiguation)
