= Amity (given name) =

- Pronunciation: ah-MEE-tee
- Gender: Female
- Language: English

Origin
- Language: Latin
- Meaning: Friendship

Amity is a feminine given name of English origin that means “friendship”. It comes from the Latin word amicus, which means "friend".

== People ==
- Amity Dry (born 1978), Australian singer-songwriter and reality show contestant
- Amity Gaige (born 1972), American novelist
- Amity Rockwell (born 1993), American professional racing cyclist also known as Amity Gregg
- Amity Shamende (born 1993), Zambian professional footballer
- Amity Shlaes (born 1960), American conservative author and newspaper and magazine columnist

== Fictional characters ==
- Amity Blight, from the Disney television series The Owl House
- Amity, from the horror comic series Witch Creek Road
- Amity 'Amma' Crellin, from Gillian Flynn's psychological thriller novel and HBO miniseries Sharp Objects

== See also ==
- Amity (disambiguation)
