= Amity Law School =

Amity Law School may refer to the following schools in India:

- Amity Law School, Delhi
- Amity Law School, Kolkata
- Amity Law School, Noida

== See also ==
- Amity University (disambiguation)
