= Amity Township, Pennsylvania =

Amity Township may refer to:

- Amity Township, Berks County, Pennsylvania
- Amity Township, Erie County, Pennsylvania

== See also ==
- Amity Township (disambiguation)
