= Future City =

Future City may refer to:

- Future City, Illinois
- Future City, Kentucky
- Future City Competition
