= Bayou Cemetery, Illinois =

Cemetery in Livingston County, Illinois

Coordinates: 40.9719°N 88.7476°W

Bayou Cemetery
- Interactive map of Bayou Cemetery

Details
- Location: Amity Township, Livingston County, Illinois
- Country: United States

Bayou Cemetery (also known as Reynolds Cemetery) is located southwest of Cornell at the southeast intersection of the Bayou and the Vermilion River in section 22 of Amity Township, Livingston County, Illinois, United States. The Bayou is the name given to the sometimes dry stream that flows between the Vermilion River and Rooks Creek when both are flooded.

== History ==
Bayou Cemetery is the final resting place of several area pioneer families. Burials date back to Margaret Winters Reynolds, the first European buried in what later became Amity Township, in 1838. through the early 20th century.

The cemetery appears nameless as "Cem." on the 1911 map of Amity Township and looks to be on property owned by either Jas. Corrigan or J. L. Gourley (the property line is hand drawn and not clear).

The 1930 to 1952 maps of Amity Township all list it as "Cem." and show it as being on the property of K. Gourley.

The 1972 township directory does not show the cemetery or property borders.
