= Columbia Secondary School =

Public school in New York City

Columbia Secondary School for Math, Science & Engineering
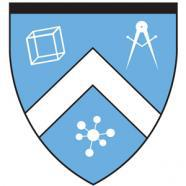

Location
- 425 W 123rd Street; New York City, New York, 10027; United States; 40°48′38″N 73°57′21″W

Information
- Type: Public (Magnet school) secondary
- Motto: Challenging Academics, a Passion for Reason and Knowledge, Strength in Diversity
- Established: 2007
- School district: 3 (partial), 4, 5, 6
- School number: M362
- Principal: Soonyoung Kwon (interim acting)
- Grades: 6 to 12
- Enrollment: 718 (2020)
- Campus: Urban
- Colors: Columbia blue and white
- Athletics: PSAL
- Mascot: Pride
- Nickname: CSS
- Newspaper: Columbia Pride
- Website: www.columbiasecondary.org

The Columbia Secondary School for Math, Science, & Engineering (also known as CSS) is a selective public, sixth- through twelfth-grade school that opened in 2007. A partnership between the New York City Department of Education, the community, and Columbia University, CSS serves students who have an interest in a program focusing on STEM fields.

Columbia Secondary School has been cited as one of the most desirable schools in New York City.

== Location ==
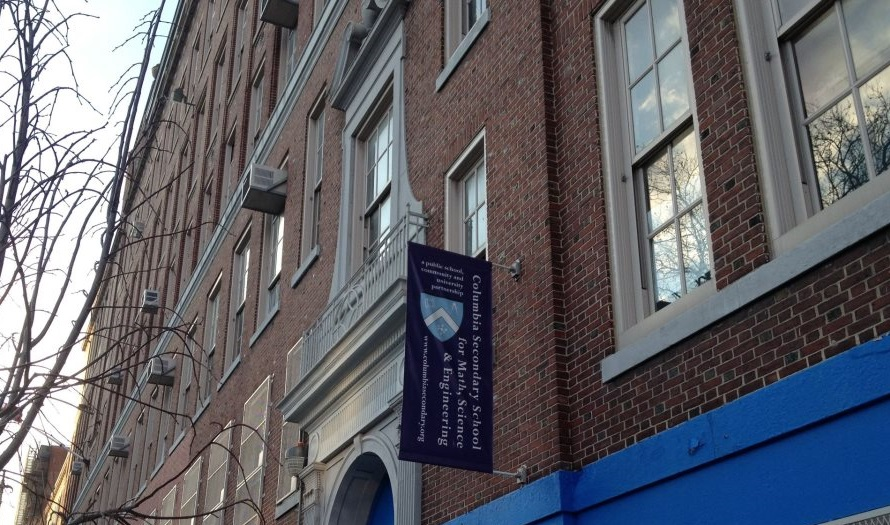
The Columbia Secondary School

Columbia Secondary School is in the Morningside Heights neighborhood in the New York City borough of Manhattan. It is co-located in the historic Lincoln School building across from Morningside Park along with the public elementary school P.S. 125 Ralph Bunche and the charter KIPP S.T.A.R. College Prep Middle School.

The school serves students from all over New York City, with most of its students coming from Manhattan and The Bronx.

== History ==
On October 21, 2005, Columbia University announced that it would collaborate with the City of New York on the creation of a new public secondary school that would address the critical need to improve education in science, math, and engineering. The school was tentatively called the "Columbia Science, Math and Engineering Secondary School," though this name was later changed to "Columbia Secondary School for Math, Science, and Engineering."

Beginning with a founding sixth grade class, the school added one grade per year until it reached its full enrollment of more than 700 students.

== Academics ==
A wide range of Advanced Placement courses are offered at the school. Special programs offered in the school include the opportunity to take college courses at Columbia University as well as philosophy and engineering courses from 6th to 12th grade.

Students are expected to go beyond the New York State graduation requirements of 44 credits and earn a total of 63 credits, successfully complete at least one Columbia University course, and successfully complete at least 150 community service hours in order to earn a diploma endorsed by the school.

=== Columbia University Partnership ===
CSS student benefits of the Columbia University partnership include, but are not limited to, the Columbia University/Columbia Secondary School High School Visiting Student Program, internship and job opportunity at the university, and admission preference into the Double Discovery Center program. Students also have access to the Columbia University Libraries, as well as the university's computing facilities and other academic support facilities.

All students at CSS are allowed to apply to the Columbia University/Columbia Secondary School High School Visiting Student Program and would be chosen for the program if they have maintained academic excellence and exceptional behavior throughout their time at CSS. This program allows students from CSS, and CSS only, to take a limited range of college classes for free; additionally, textbook and course materials are supplied by CSS and the university.

== Extracurricular activities ==
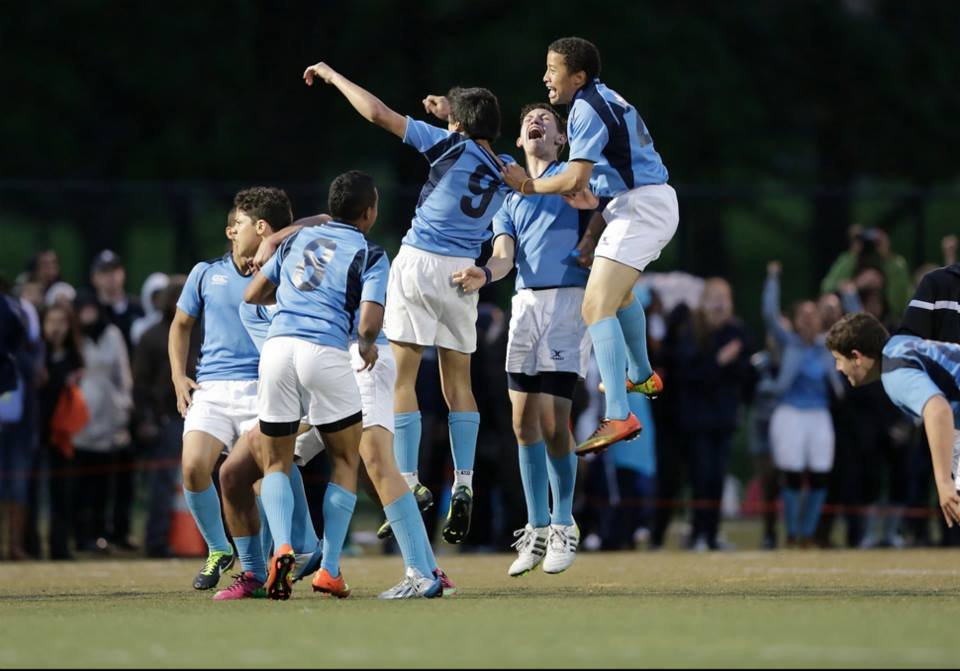
The CSS boys rugby team celebrates one victory at the 2013 PSAL conference championship

Though there is a wide array of science and math oriented electives, electives also allow students also interested in the humanities to fulfill their interests in these fields. The school has also put on a musical each year since 2009. The school has also participated in the Future City Competition, and their 2013 and 2020 teams had won their New York Regional competition.

In addition, CSS has several sports teams that compete in the Public Schools Athletic League (PSAL).

=== Publications ===
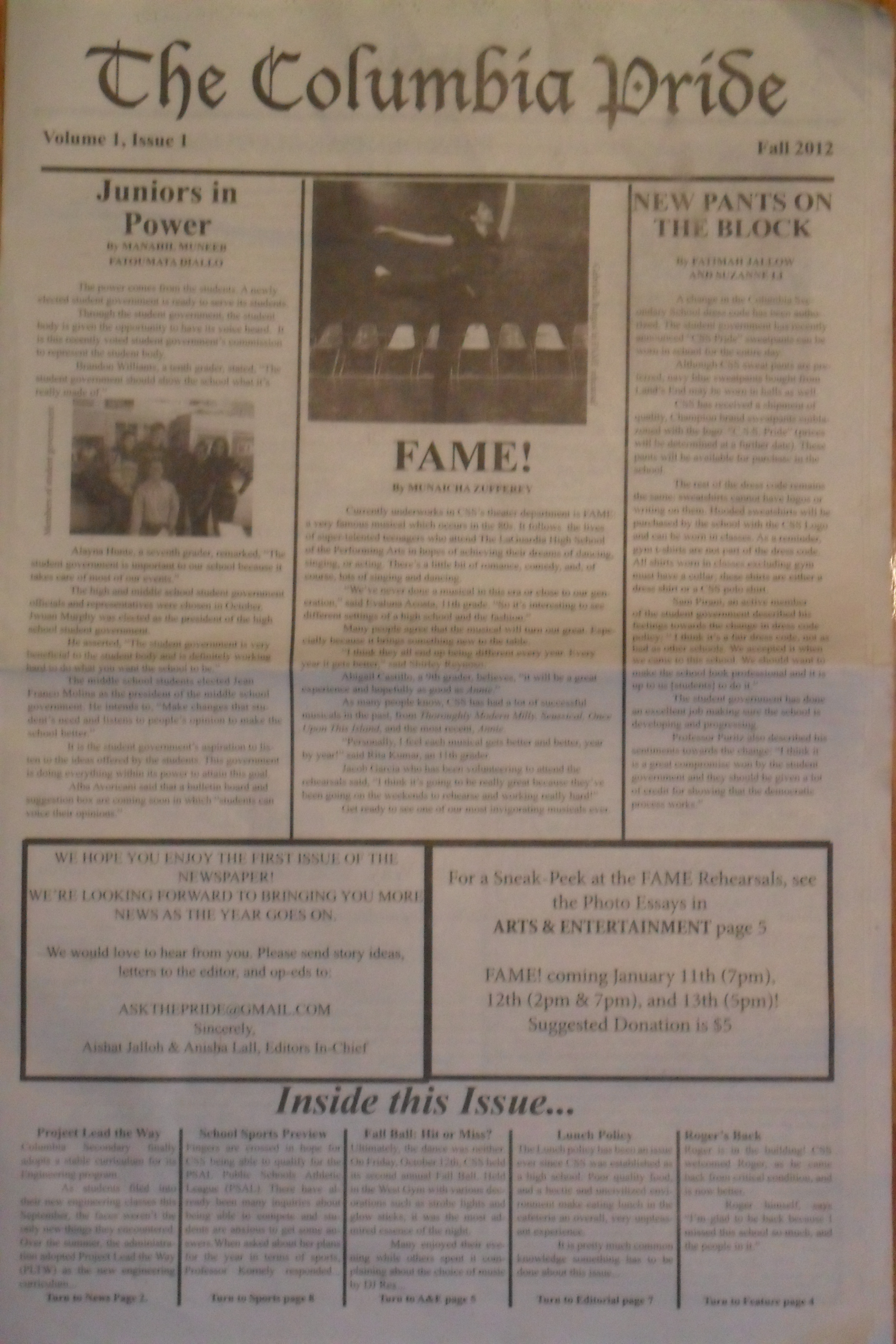
The first issue in volume one of the Columbia Pride, published in fall 2012

The school's official newspaper, the Columbia Pride, has published a new issue seasonally since fall of 2012, and weekly since fall of 2018. It covers topics of student interest such as news within the school, giving recognition to those making a difference in the school's community, and personal opinions from students on current events. The newspaper is available for free in print and online.

In 2014, the school released the inaugural issue of its philosophy journal, CONTRARIWISE, which features students' essays, dialogues, roundtables, letters, stories, poems, and other writings on philosophical topics ranging from time to tyranny. The journal is published annually; copies are available for purchase at the school, at events, and through the journal's website.

== Controversial history ==
In June 2010, a student died on a school trip to an unpatrolled beach on Long Island. An investigation by the New York City Department of Education concluded that multiple parties were to blame. The children went swimming in the ocean when no lifeguards were on duty and the beach was officially closed, according to signs posted at the time. The children were accompanied on the school trip by three adults. Further, no permission slips had been signed by parents allowing children to attend the trip. Finally the NYC DOE determined that CSS's Principal and Vice Principal at the time were responsible for not placing sufficient order or safeguards in place to ensure student safety. The teacher who led the school trip was fired. The Vice Principal was also demoted. Principal Maldonado received tenure days before he was officially reprimanded, and so retained his position. However, his tenure was revoked. He was eligible to attain tenure within two years. Nearly 50 percent of the teachers left the school when this decision came down.

In Fall 2010, Principal Maldonado was fired by the New York City DOE. The stated reason for his dismissal was an improper relationship with another school official, the parent coordinator. The parent coordinator had been the principal's babysitter. The principal had then allowed her to move into an apartment he owned rent free. He also hired her as his parent coordinator. They admitted a romantic involvement, which they said started only after she was no longer parent coordinator in September of that year.
