= Ramsey Cemetery =

Cemetery in Effingham County, Illinois

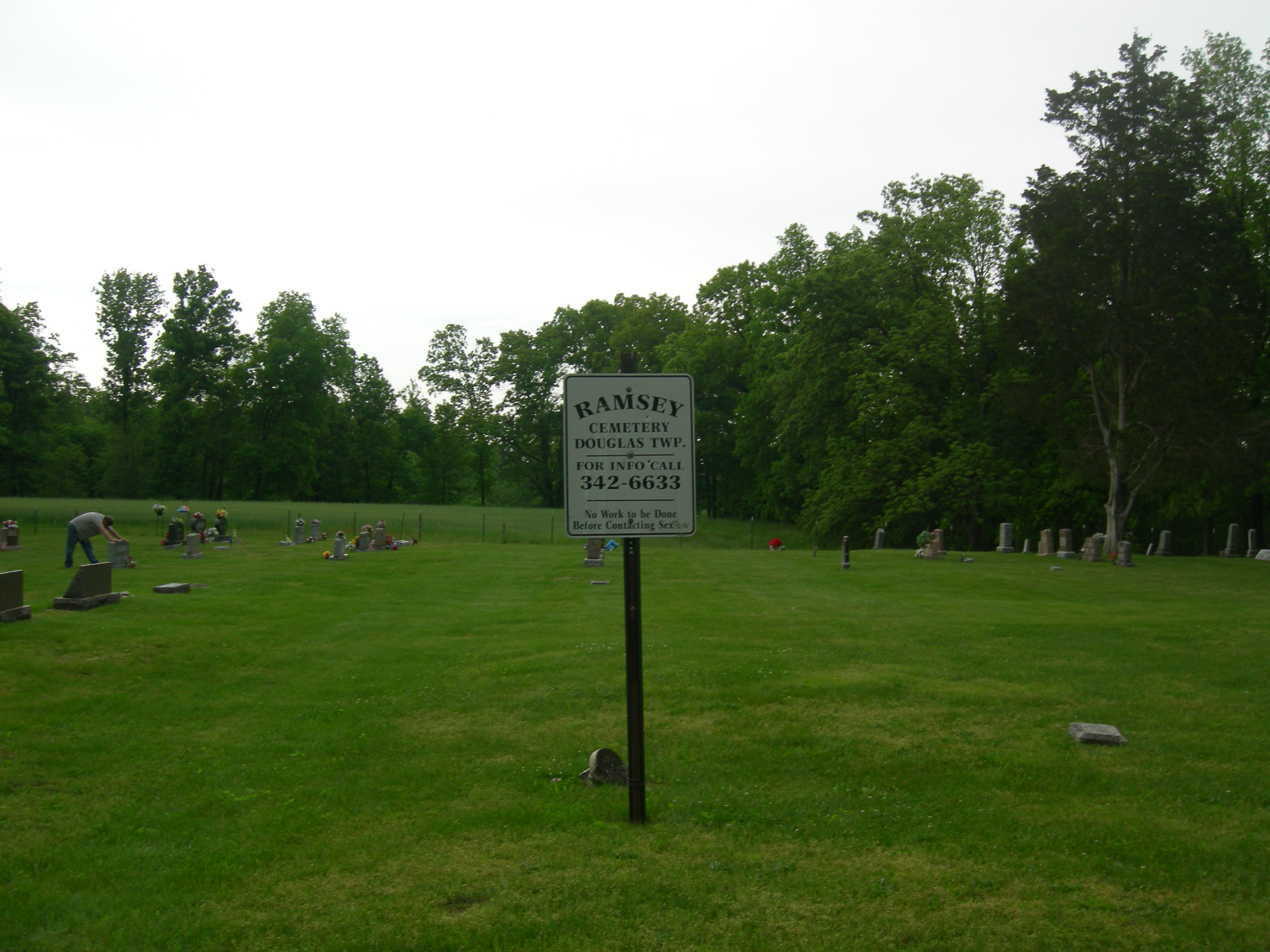
- Ramsey Cemetery, located in Effingham County, Illinois.
- Interactive map of Ramsey Cemetery

Details
- Established: 1851
- Location: Effingham County, Illinois
- Country: United States
- Coordinates: 39°12′18″N 88°34′27″W
- Type: Public
- Find a Grave: Ramsey Cemetery

Ramsey Cemetery is a cemetery located in Effingham County, Illinois, with the nearest town being Shumway, Illinois. The cemetery is one of the oldest in the area and was created in 1851 with the burial of Alexander Ramsey. The main attraction is the collection of caves that are situated near the cemetery. It has also been nicknamed the Casbar Cemetery.

== Location ==
Ramsey Cemetery is located in Effingham County. It is approximately six miles away from the intersection of the Interstate 57 and Interstate 70. The cemetery is situated at the gateway to Little Egypt, which is a nickname given to the area of Southern Illinois. Next to the graves are a collection of caves, or rock shelters. These caves are made of sandstone and are thousands of years old. Generations of people have carved names, words, and declarations of love into the walls of rock.

== History ==
Ramsey Cemetery began as a private project in 1851 with the burial of 29-year-old Alexander Ramsey. Within the next three years, three more Ramseys were buried, and it soon became a community cemetery. Although it is unsure how it became nicknamed the Casbar Cemetery, there are many attempted explanations. One of these is that the nickname came from the song "Rock the Casbah," by The Clash. Others speculate that the name came from "Algiers," a popular movie from 1938, first introducing many Americans to the Casbah, the center of the city Algeria, Algiers.

A small chapel also used to accompany the grounds from the 1920s to the 1960s to benefit mourners of the cemetery. A young man in the 1960s drove out to the cemetery and shot himself inside of the chapel. The chapel has since been torn down due to vandalism.

== Professional work ==
Ramsey Cemetery has been mentioned in the works of Legends and lore of Illinois by Michael Kleen. It is a monthly publication that featured Ramsey Cemetery in February 2009. Each issue focuses on a unique location in Illinois and the experiences that the team go through while at a site. The magazine focuses on a unique location every issue, and contains factual information about the location, as well as personal experiences of the team.

Ramsey Cemetery was also mentioned in the book The Illinois Road Guide to Haunted Locations, by Chad Lewis and Terry Fisk.

== See also ==
- List of cemeteries in Illinois
