= Jones Library =

- Location: Amherst, Massachusetts, United States of America
- Type: Public Library
- Established: 1919
- Branches: 2

Collection
- Size: 252,000

Access and use
- Circulation: 530,000
- Population served: 38,000
- Members: 20,000

Other information
- Budget: $2,230,000
- Director: Ms. Sharon Sharry
- Employees: 54
- Website: www.joneslibrary.org

The Jones Library of Amherst, Massachusetts is a public library with three locations, the main building and two branches. The library was established in 1919 by a fund set up in the will of lumberman Samuel Minot Jones. The library is governed by a board of trustees and provides a range of library materials, electronic resources, programming, special collections and events for residents of Amherst and the surrounding area. The library is on the Association of Library Trustees, Advocates, Friends and Foundations’ Literary Landmark Register in recognition of its association with poet Robert Frost.

== History ==
Samuel Minot Jones was a Civil War soldier and lumber trader whose family had lived in Amherst since 1839. Although he spent most of his own life in Chicago and New Jersey, he retained an attachment to Amherst and particularly to Amity Street, the location of his childhood home. In his 1905 will, Jones laid out a provision that should “no child survive me or all die before the age of twenty-one years,” the money willed to his children should instead go to the town of Amherst to fund a free public library. He died on October 10, 1912.

In 1918 Samuel Minot Jones’ only son, Minot Jones, died of Spanish influenza at age nineteen while training for World War I in Camp Polk, North Carolina. At that point Jones’ fortune was entrusted to the town of Amherst and the Jones Library trustees, an amount then totaling $661,747.08.

On March 21, 1919, the Massachusetts Legislature passed an act of incorporation allowing “The Jones Library, Incorporated,” to receive and administer their endowment funds. In April 1919 the trustees held their first meeting. Although both Jones’ will and the act of incorporation specified the construction of a fireproof building, the trustees set up a temporary “reading room” in apartment housing across the street from their future building site.

The first librarian of the Jones Library was Charles Robert Green. He had been the librarian of the Massachusetts Agricultural College (now University of Massachusetts Amherst) since 1908, but the College's budgetary restrictions on their library induced him to seek other work. He was appointed the librarian of the Jones Library on September 1, 1920.

From 1920 to 1926, Green established the Jones Library in the temporary space nearby the building site and expanded the collection. Over five thousand books were received from the recently closed Amherst town library, and the Boltwood family donated a collection of local history books and manuscripts. In 1922 the library began to host programming in one of the rented rooms, including academic lectures, storytelling, and adult literature classes.

On December 9, 1926, a fire broke out in the apartment building that served as the library's temporary location. Local college students worked with firefighters to save many of the books and furniture, and though the library lost significant portions of collections and their records, they were able to re-open in hastily leased rooms the very next day. The new rooms were in the F.S. Whipple home on North Pleasant Street, directly adjacent to the lot on Amity Street purchased as a location for the projected library building, on which construction soon began.

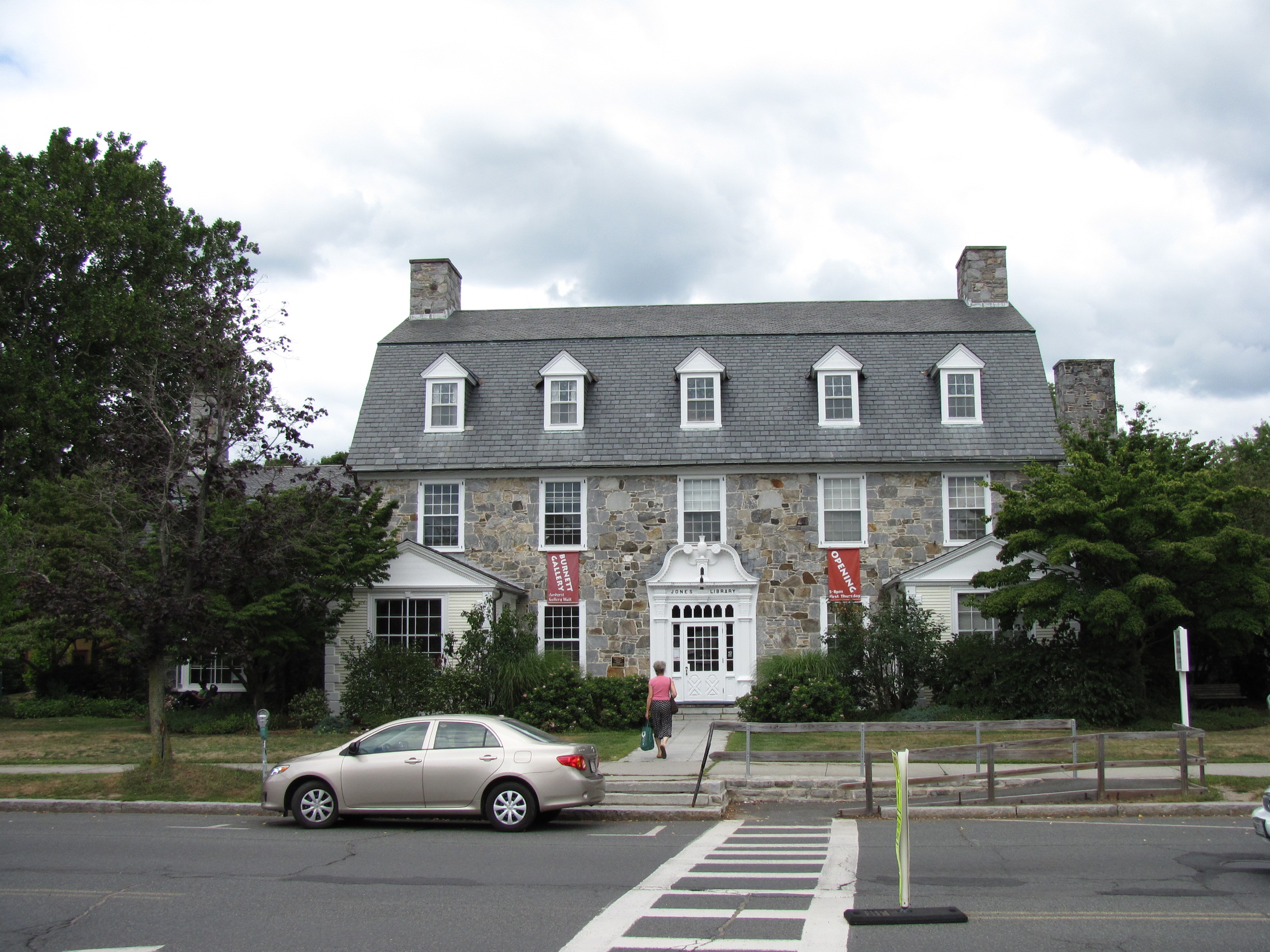
The front entrance of the Jones Library facing Amity Street in 2010.

The Amity Street building, designed by Allan Cox of the Putnam & Cox architecture firm, was completed on November 1, 1928. The trustees and architects intentionally designed the building to look more like a home than a public space: the intention was for the library to play the role of “Mother Amherst welcoming her children home.” It was also one of the first libraries to house a public auditorium space for community performances and gatherings; the idea was so new that when the programs first started the librarian wrote to the State Library Commission to check that they were legally allowed to hold events in a library space.

Charles Green, the first librarian, encouraged local authors, poets, academics, biographers and other literary figures to come speak at the library. Notable performers and patrons of the library included poets David Morton, Robert Francis and Robert Frost, Nobel Prize winner Dr. William Murphy, Supreme Court Justice Harlan Fiske Stone, and journalist Ray Stannard Baker (under his pseudonym David Grayson).

William F. Merrill became the second director of the library in 1954. The subsequent directors were Quentin De Streel (1971–75), Anne Turner (1975–80), Bonnie Isman (1980–2010) and Sharon Sharry (2011–present).

In 2003 the Jones Library formed a sister library relationship with a library in Kanegasaki, Japan. The libraries exchange books and resources, particularly those related to Emily Dickinson.

== Branches ==
The Jones Library has two branches in addition to the main Amity Street location.

The Munson Memorial Library is on South East Street in South Amherst. It is named for Parnell T. Munson, whose widow donated $30,000 in her will to build a library in Amherst in 1914. When the much larger Samuel Minot Jones bequest was made 5 years later, the plans already underway for the Munson bequest were scrapped. The building to house the Munson Memorial Library was finally built in 1930, as a branch of the Jones Library, and later evolved into a community center with a library inside.

The North Amherst Library was the first free public library in Amherst, initially sustained through membership dues instead of an endowment. It was established in 1873, and has been located at its current address on Montague Road since 1891. The building is part of the North Amherst Center Historic District. The North Amherst library became a branch of the Jones Library on June 20, 1925.

== Collections ==
=== Emily Dickinson Collection ===
Poet Emily Dickinson was born and lived most of her life in Amherst, Massachusetts. The Emily Dickinson Museum is located in her family home less than a mile from the Jones Library's main location. Charles Green, the first director of the library, was a Dickinson scholar and began building a collection of her works in 1924. Subsequent directors and patrons to the library built on Green's foundation. The Jones Library Emily Dickinson Collection currently consists of approximately seven thousand items, including original manuscript poems and letters, Dickinson editions and translations, family correspondence, scholarly articles and books, newspaper clippings, theses, plays, photographs, and contemporary artwork and prints.

=== Robert Frost Collection ===
Poet Robert Frost was a sometimes resident of Amherst from 1917 until his death in 1963. He formed a friendship with Charles Green, the first director of the library: Frost said that Green was “the first person who thought he was worth collecting”. By the time he retired as curator of the Robert Frost collection in 1966, Green had collected over 60 manuscripts, more than 25 shelves of published material by or about Frost, and a large compilation of newspaper clippings, photographs and periodicals.

The Jones Library Robert Frost Collection currently consists of approximately twelve thousand items, including original manuscript poems and letters, correspondence and photographs, as well as audio and visual recordings.

=== Other collections ===
- Boltwood Historical and Genealogical Collections
- Amherst Authors Collection
- Photograph Collection
- Ray Stannard Baker (David Grayson) Collection
- Clifton Johnson Collection
- Julius Lester Collection
- Harlan Fiske Stone Collection
- Sidney Waugh Collection
- Robert Francis Collection
- John and Ruth Burgess Collection
- Robert M. McClung Collection
- Amherst Newspapers and Historical Journals Collection

== Services ==
=== Kid’s Room ===
The Kids Room includes pre-reading books, multimedia resources, a toddler play space, and a Parenting Collection. The Kids programming includes the Afterschool Writing and Book Clubs, the Lego Club, the Chess Club, Spanish Story Hours, and Preschool Story time.

=== ESL ===
The Jones Library English as a Second Language tutoring program matches adult English students with native English speakers. Tutors work one-on-one with students to build conversational literacy skills. The program is also designed to help prepare immigrant students for citizenship, and to provide cultural orientation to Amherst and the US.

=== Subscription databases ===
The library has subscription access to 48 databases.

=== Meeting Rooms ===
The Jones Library has two rooms that are open for local groups and businesses to use: the Amherst Room and the Woodbury Room.

=== Homebound delivery ===
The Jones Library delivers books, music, audiobooks, DVDs and magazines to residents who are homebound or unable to get to the library.

== Accessibility ==
Jones Library has assistive listening devices available in the Woodbury Room. It is accessible in compliance with the Americans with Disabilities Act.

== Programs ==
The Jones Library hosts a variety of programming for the local community, as part of its mission to support civic and cultural life in the region. The range of programming includes events such as:

- Book Clubs
- Poetry Reading Series
- On the Same Page Community Reading Program
- Children's Music Series
- Town/Gown Lecture Series, in partnership with the University of Massachusetts Amherst
- Summer Reading Program, for children and adults
- Art & Crafts

== Digital Amherst Project ==
The Digital Amherst Project is an online multimedia resource of historical and cultural materials. The site contains over 1000 items such as written documents, photographs, sermons, multimedia presentations, and new articles It was introduced at the 250th anniversary of the town of Amherst in spring 2009. The Digital Amherst Project has been recognized by the American Library Association for its use of cutting-edge technology in library services and is listed as one of 10 top resources for community digital archives by the Library of Congress.

== Burnett Gallery ==
The Burnett Gallery is located on the second floor of the Jones Library Amity Street location, and displays rotating exhibits by community artists. Part of the mission of the Gallery is to display a wide range of community art: “Collectively, the library's exhibits aim to reflect a variety of media, styles, cultural viewpoints, and levels of artistic experience”. The Gallery is a stop on Amherst's First Thursday Art Walk.

== Governance ==
The Jones Library is governed by an elected board of trustees, which consists of six members elected for 3-year terms. “The board has legal responsibility for the provision of library services, custody of library property, appointment of the library director, expenditure of funds, and determination of library policy,” Trustee meetings are open to the public and minutes are posted on the library website.

== Friends of the Jones Libraries ==
The Friends of the Jones Libraries is a non-profit organization dedicated to raising money for library programs, items and services not covered by the library's annual budget. Members contribute an annual amount to the fund as well as assisting with programming and advertising for the library.

== See also ==
- Amherst, Massachusetts
