= Amity High School =

Amity High School may refer to:

- Amity Regional High School, Woodbridge, Connecticut
- Amity High School (Oregon), Amity, Oregon

== See also ==
- Brooklyn Amity School, Brooklyn, New York, a private school for students from kindergarten to grade 12
- Amity International School (disambiguation)
