= Amity Township =

Amity Township is the name of several townships in the US:

- Amity Township, Livingston County, Illinois
- Amity Township, Page County, Iowa
- Amity Township, Bottineau County, North Dakota
- Amity Township, Berks County, Pennsylvania
- Amity Township, Erie County, Pennsylvania

== See also ==
- Amity (disambiguation)
