= Graymont, Illinois =

- Unincorporated community
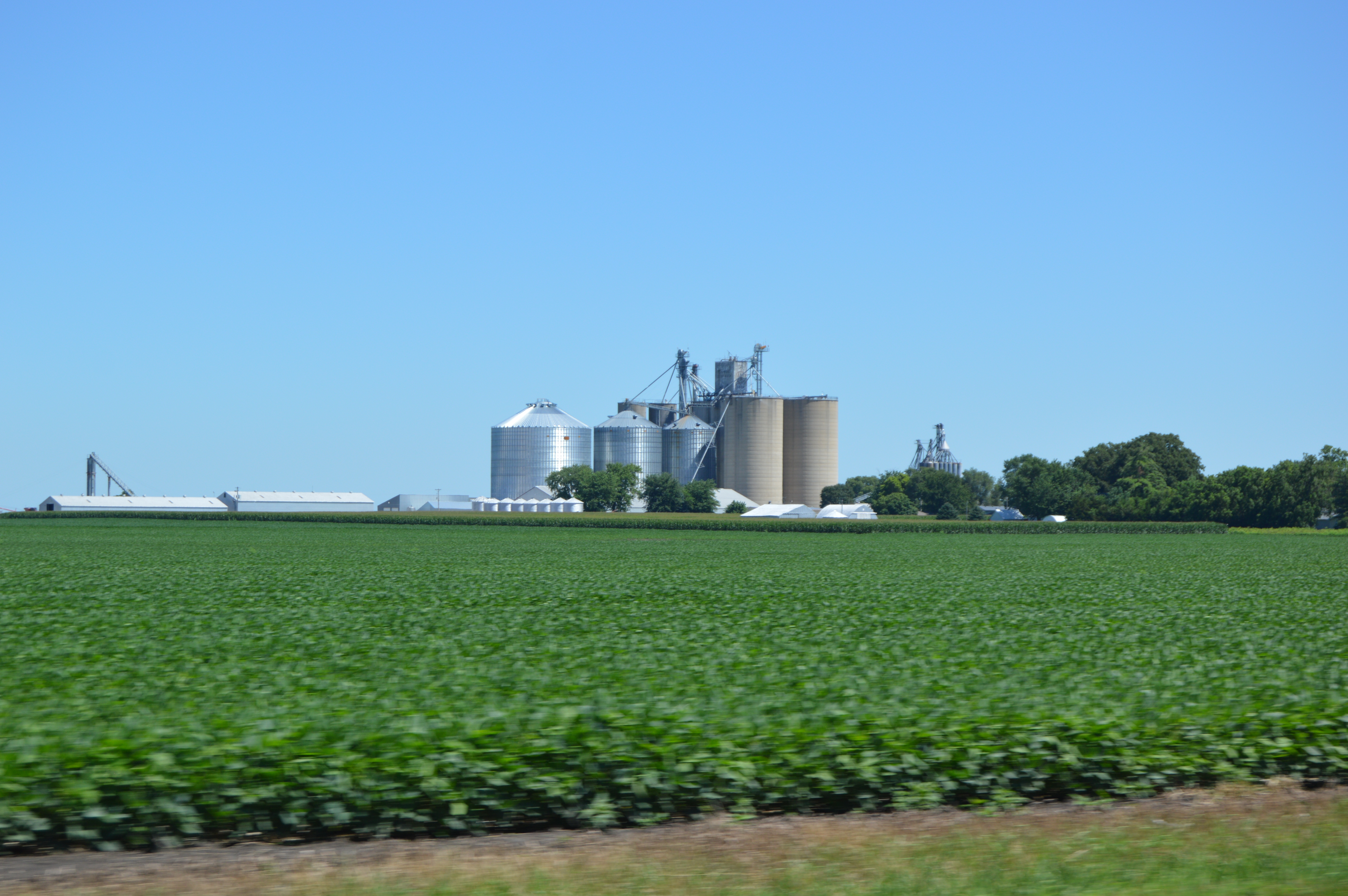
- Distant view from Illinois Route 116

- Location within Illinois Location within the United States
- Coordinates: 40°52′40″N 88°46′37″W
- Country: United States
- State: Illinois
- County: Livingston
- Township: Rooks Creek
- Elevation: 653 ft (199 m)
- Time zone: UTC-6 (Central (CST))
  - Summer (DST): UTC-5 (CDT)
- ZIP code: 61743
- Area codes: 815 & 779
- GNIS feature ID: 409354

Graymont is an unincorporated community in Livingston County, Illinois, United States. Graymont is 7 miles (11 km) west of Pontiac. Graymont has a post office with ZIP code 61743.

== History ==
Farmers Elevator Company of Graymont, now known as the Graymont co-op association, was founded 1904. The original structures no longer exist, but the company is still operation and has expanded to become one of the largest in Livingston County, IL. The State Bank of Graymont began operations in 1913.
