= Rooks Creek (Vermilion River tributary) =

Coordinates: 40°57′44″N 88°44′16″W

Rooks Creek is a tributary of the Vermilion River, an Illinois River tributary, in Illinois. It flows through Rooks Creek Township and runs through the property formerly occupied by Bayou Bluffs Campground in Amity Township in Livingston County, Illinois, before emptying into the Vermilion River south of Cornell.

== History ==
Rooks Creek and Rooks Creek Township were named after Roderick Rook. He was the first settler in the area that would eventually be Rooks Creek Township, arriving from Pennsylvania with his family some time between late 1830 and the Spring of 1831. It is noted that this area was the hunting grounds of the Kickapoo.
