= Amityville (disambiguation) =

Amityville, New York is a village in the United States.

Amityville may also refer to:

- Amityville, Pennsylvania, USA
- "Amityville", a song by Eminem from The Marshall Mathers LP
- "Amityville (The House on the Hill)", a 1986 song by Lovebug Starski
- Amityville horror franchise; see Works based on the Amityville haunting

== See also ==
- The Amityville Horror, a 1977 novel by Jay Anson that has spawned a series of films and other creative works
- Amity (disambiguation)
