= Amity, Illinois =

Amity, Illinois may refer to:

- Amity, a town plat that became part of Cornell, Illinois
- Pocohontas, Illinois, formerly named Amity
