= Woodlawn Cemetery (Carbondale, Illinois) =

- U.S. National Register of Historic Places
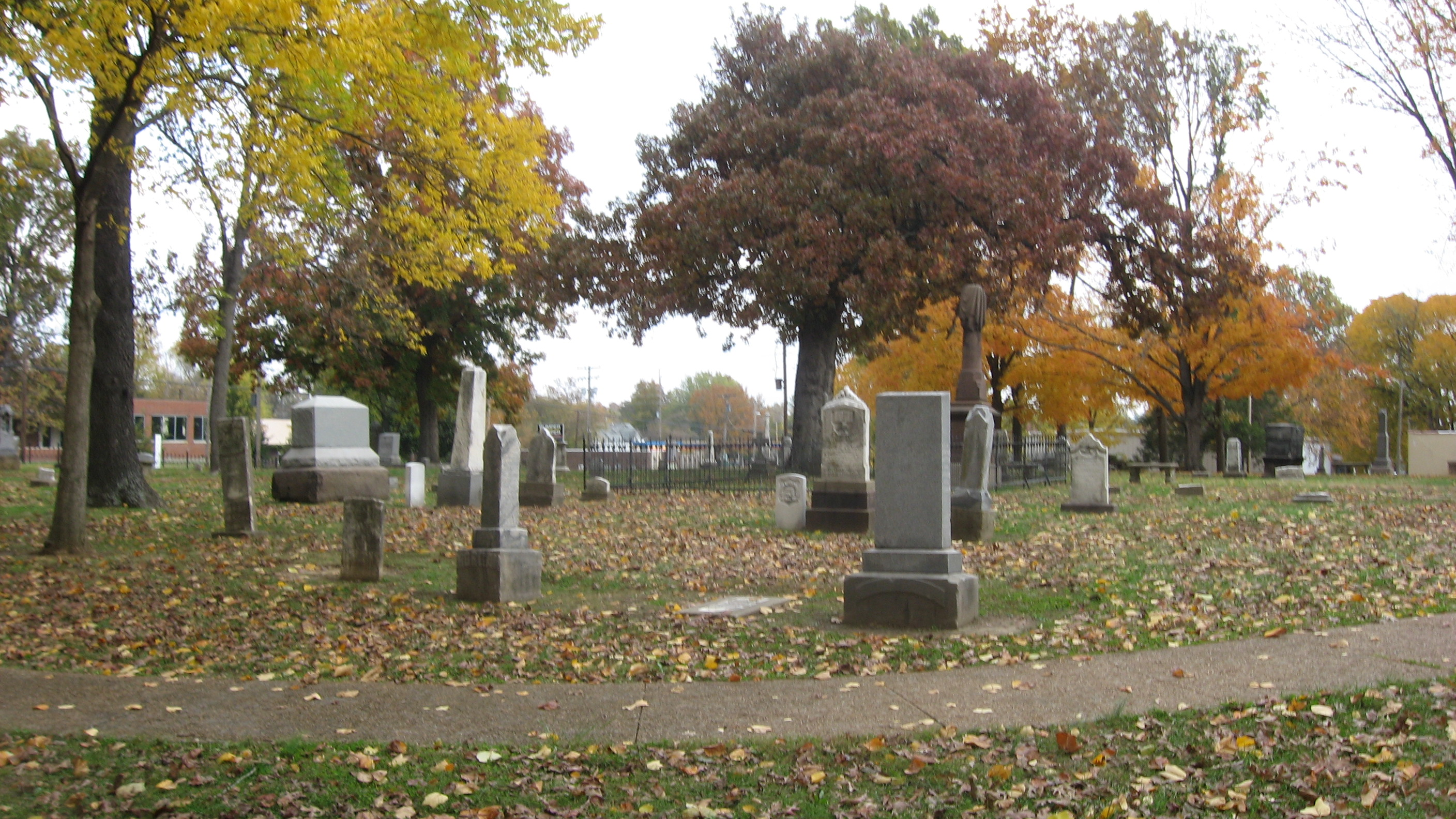

- Location within Illinois Location within the United States
- Location: 405 E. Main St., Carbondale, Illinois
- Coordinates: 37°43′38″N 89°12′39″W
- Area: 2.6 acres (1.1 ha)
- NRHP reference No.: 85003219
- Added to NRHP: December 19, 1985

Woodlawn Cemetery is a cemetery located at 405 E. Main Street in Carbondale, which is known for hosting one of the first Memorial Day celebrations in the United States. The cemetery was established in 1854, two years before the incorporation of Carbondale. Over twenty Civil War soldiers, most of them Carbondale natives, were buried in the cemetery during the war. In April 1866, three Civil War veterans from Carbondale organized an event to honor the dead soldiers and decorate their gravesites; this event was one of the earliest observations of Memorial Day. The event included a speech by General John A. Logan, who in 1868 called for the national observance of Memorial Day as commander-in-chief of the Grand Army of the Republic.

The cemetery was added to the National Register of Historic Places on December 19, 1985.
