= Summit View Cemetery, Ottawa =

Pioneer cemetery in LaSalle County, Illinois

Coordinates: 41°19′32″N 88°50′11″W

Summit View Cemetery
- Interactive map of Summit View Cemetery

Details
- Established: 1828
- Location: Ottawa, Illinois
- Find a Grave: Summit View Cemetery

Summit View Cemetery is a historic pioneer cemetery located in Ottawa, Illinois. Summit View Cemetery was established in 1828, and was known as the South Ottawa Cemetery until 1894.
