= Quincy National Cemetery =

Historic veterans cemetery in Adams County, Illinois

- U.S. National Register of Historic Places
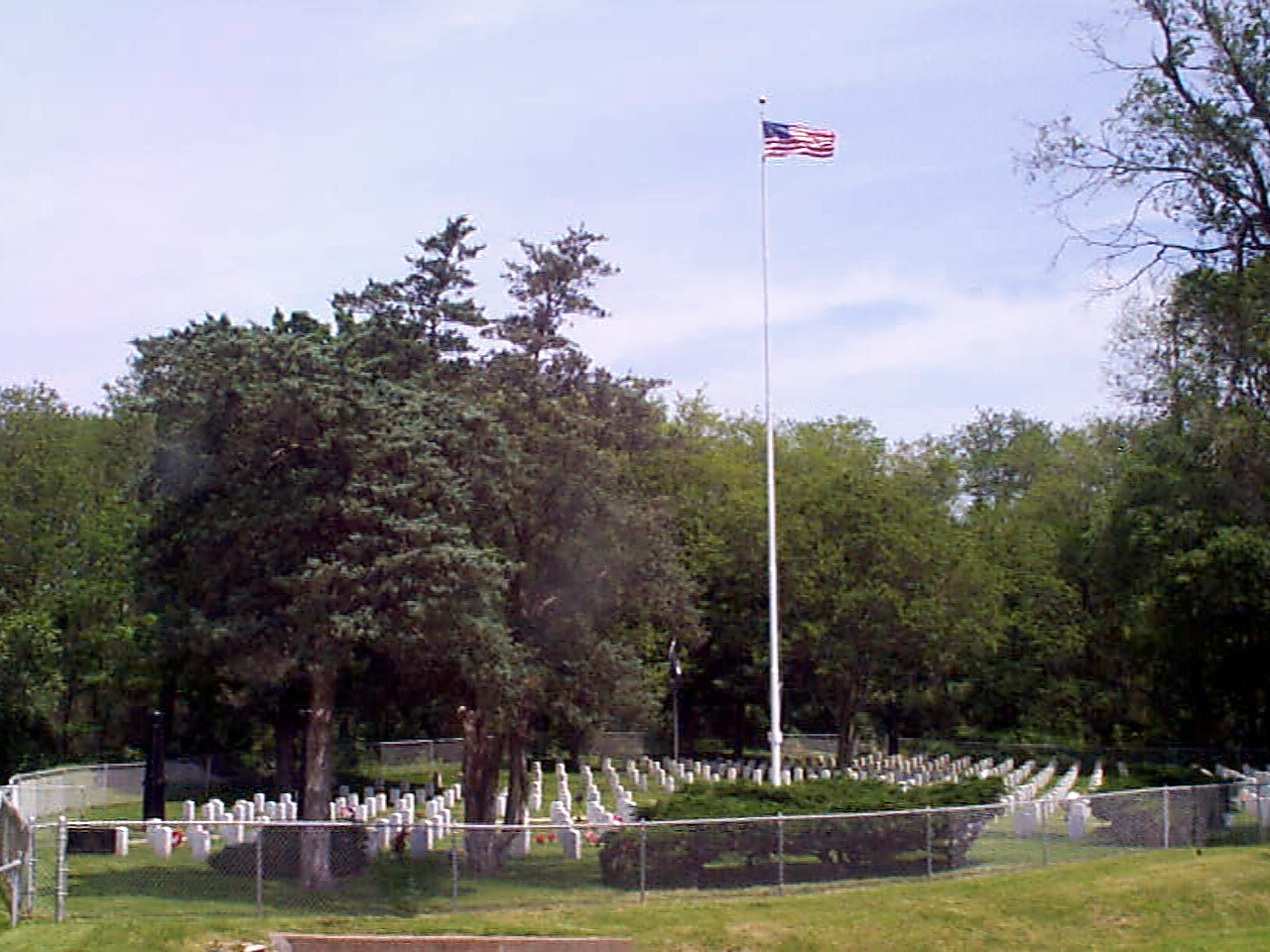

- Location within Illinois
- Location: 36th & Main Sts. Quincy, Illinois
- Coordinates: 39°55′56″N 91°21′20″W
- Built: 1861
- MPS: Civil War Era National Cemeteries MPS
- NRHP reference No.: 11000242
- Added to NRHP: May 7, 2011

Quincy National Cemetery is a small United States National Cemetery located in the city of Quincy, in Adams County, Illinois. Administered by the United States Department of Veterans Affairs, it encompasses slightly less than a half an acre, and as 2014, had 690 interments. It is currently closed to new interments, and is maintained by Rock Island National Cemetery.

== History ==
Originally a one-quarter acre plot within Woodland Cemetery, the first burials took place in 1861. It was designated a National Cemetery on July 24, 1882.

In 1899, the Federal Government purchase a 0.45-acre lot within Graceland Cemetery in Adams County, Illinois, and all the interments were transferred there from the soldiers' plot in Woodland Cemetery. Major Martin M. Burke oversaw the removal of the remains.

Quincy National Cemetery is a rectangular parcel surrounded by a black metal picket fence with an entrance on the west side. A circular flagpole plaza is centered in the cemetery. There are 24 rows running north and south.

Sometime between 1936 and 1949, a fence dividing Graceland and the National Cemetery was improperly placed. An act of Congress (Public Law 116) was passed in 1953 to rectify the resulting property dispute. More modern changes to the cemetery have divided it from Graceland so as to be its own cemetery.

The cemetery was added to the National Register of Historic Places on May 7, 2011.

== Notable monuments ==
- Three gun monuments the New York Arsenal.
