= Amity University =

Amity University may refer to:

== India ==
- Amity University, Noida in Uttar Pradesh (Main Campus)
- Amity University, Gurgaon in Haryana
- Amity University, Jaipur in Rajasthan
- Amity University, Jharkhand in Ranchi, Jharkhand
- Amity University, Gwalior in Madhya Pradesh
- Amity University, Kolkata in West Bengal
- Amity University, Mumbai in Maharashtra
- Amity University, Patna in Bihar
- Amity University, Raipur in Chhattisgarh

== See also ==
- Amity (disambiguation)
