= Woodland Cemetery (Quincy, Illinois) =

- U.S. National Register of Historic Places
- U.S. Historic district
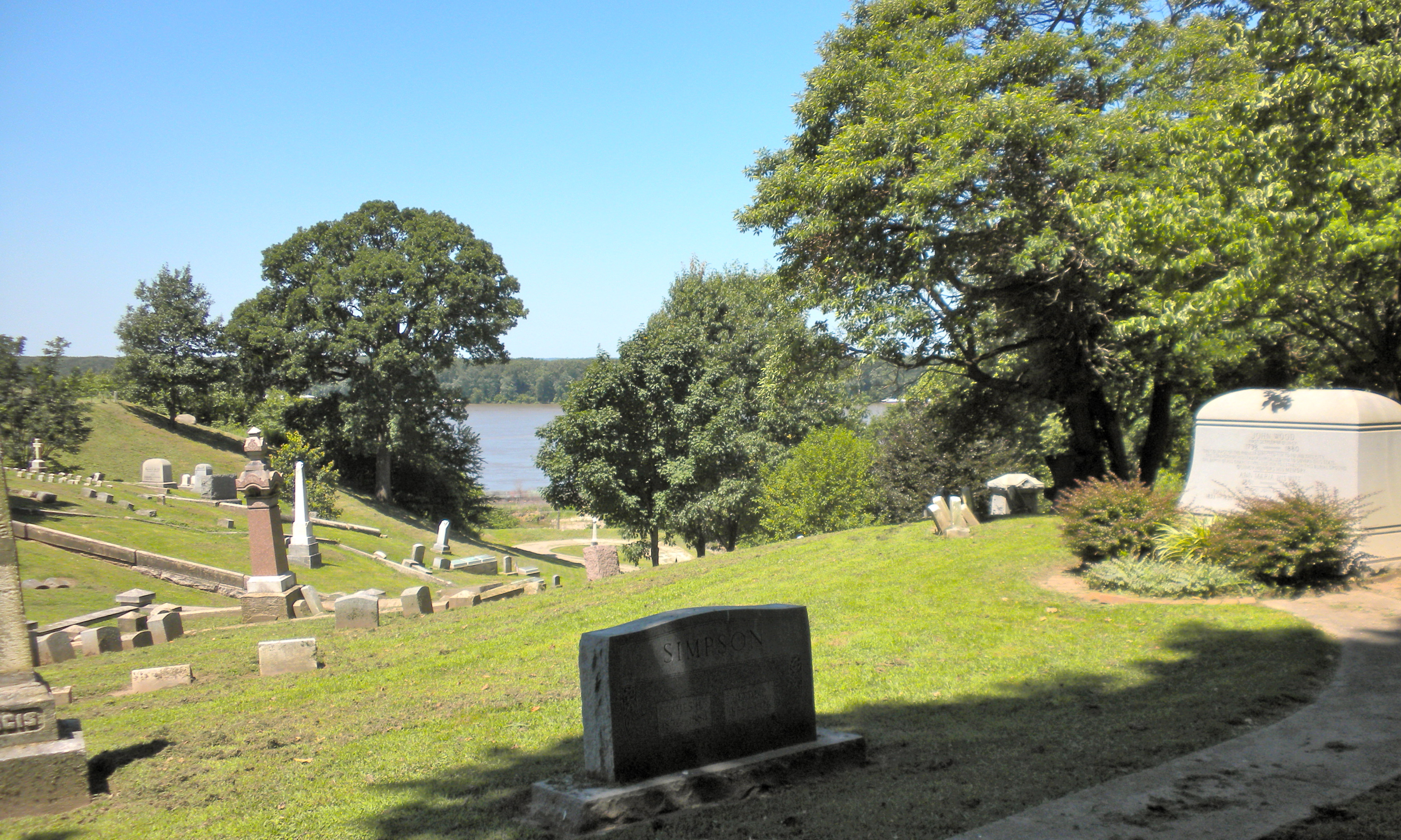

- Location within Illinois Location within the United States
- Location: 1020 S. Fifth St., Quincy, Illinois
- Coordinates: 39°55′10″N 91°24′36″W
- Area: 45 acres (18 ha)
- Built: 1846
- Architect: John Wood
- NRHP reference No.: 02000096
- Added to NRHP: March 1, 2002

Woodland Cemetery is a historic cemetery located at 1020 South Fifth Street in Quincy, Illinois. Planned by politician John Wood and opened in 1846, the cemetery is a product of America's rural cemetery movement of the mid-nineteenth century. The cemetery's grave markers include smaller Victorian monuments and large Gothic Revival and Neoclassical structures. The cemetery was added to the National Register of Historic Places in 2002.

== History ==
From its establishment in 1825 to the 1840s, Quincy's only public cemeteries were a burial ground on Maine Street and a small plot in Jefferson Park. The city began to run out of space to bury its dead as it grew, and John Wood, then mayor of Quincy and eventual governor of Illinois, began plans for a larger cemetery in 1846. Wood bought a plot of land overlooking the Mississippi River and planned the cemetery's landscape himself, following the principles of the rural cemetery movement. The movement, which came to America with the opening of the Mount Auburn Cemetery in the Boston area, promoted burial grounds which also served as parks and leisure spots for the living; these cemeteries had curving roads, large green spaces, and exquisite ornamental grave markers. The cemetery's design incorporates Quincy's natural geography and is the only remaining part of the city with its original hilly landscape.

The cemetery became popular soon after it opened, and it accepted both new burials and relocated remains from the city's other cemeteries; the oldest grave in the cemetery predates its opening by eighteen years. The State of Illinois deemed Wood the owner of the cemetery, which passed to the city of Quincy upon his death; he was also appointed sexton of the cemetery. In the following decades, burials in the cemetery came to reflect significant events in the city. A cholera epidemic swept through Quincy from 1849 to 1851, and many victims were interred in the cemetery despite laws forbidding it. In the 1860s, the cemetery accepted almost 250 of the city's Civil War dead; these burials led to the formation of the Quincy National Cemetery, which was later relocated, and the construction of a marble war memorial. Several large tombs were added in the late nineteenth and early twentieth century, and a bandstand was added in 1934.

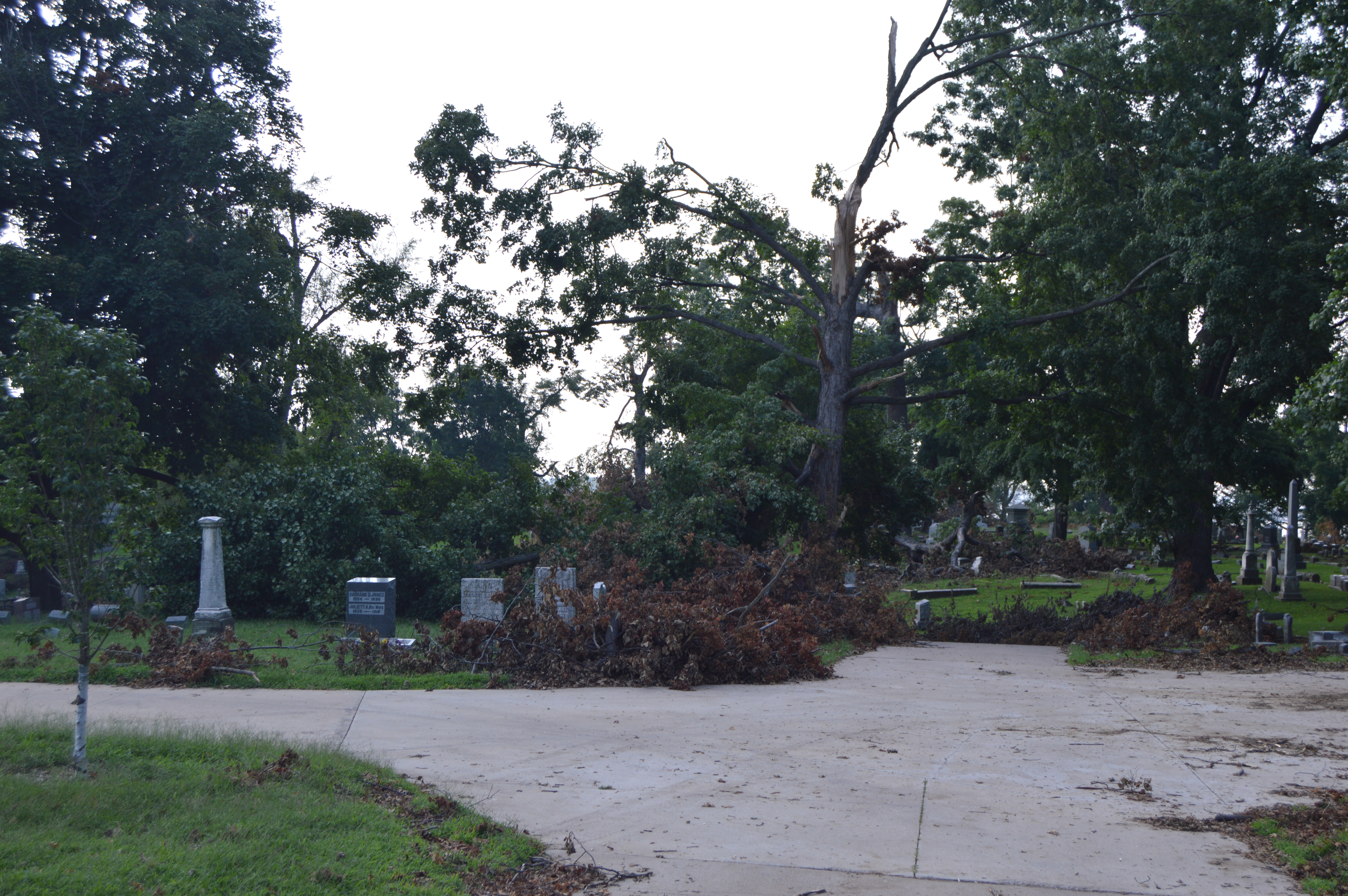
Aftermath of July 2015 storm damage

The cemetery was added to the National Register of Historic Places on March 1, 2002. A storm damaged the cemetery in 2015, breaking its Civil War memorial.

== Architecture ==
The larger tombs in the cemetery were mainly designed in two styles: Late Gothic Revival and Classical Revival. Late Gothic Revival tombs, which included the Osborn vault, featured medieval influences and simple designs. The Classical Revival tombs took on two different styles; the most prominent variant, seen in the Lynds vault and the large 1927 mausoleum, resembled a Greek temple with columns and a frieze. The other variation, used most prominently in the Rogers vault, featured extensive marble ornamentation and a large portico similar to Neoclassical residential architecture. Many of the individual grave markers include Victorian elements popular in the mid-nineteenth century; these monuments used metal or stone and represented Victorian ideals about life and death. Common motifs include obelisks, spiritual symbols such as angels, symbols representing the deceased's life such as occupational elements, and natural symbols such as logs or fallen trees. Lambs were commonly used on the graves of children, as they symbolized innocence in Victorian culture.
