= Amity Church Settlement =

Coordinates: 40°45′54″N 73°59′7″W

Amity Church Settlement was an American settlement house founded in 1896 and auxiliary to Amity Baptist Church. It was located at 314 West 54th Street in the Manhattan borough of New York City, New York. Its purpose included the religious and social well-being of the neighborhood. Services included educational classes, lectures, and poor relief. The director was Rev. Leighton Williams, Pastor. The undenominational spirit and able management of the House attracted confidence and financial assistance from outside Baptist lines. Its basal function was that of establishing residence in the crowded neighborhood where its work lay and bringing to bear upon the labor in hand the influence of the home. It sought to unite the idea of the Church and of the social settlement. The settlement was unincorporated, and was maintained by Amity Baptist Church and by voluntary contributions. The work was classified as (1) religious, including the various church services; (2) educational, including kindergarten, industrial school, evening classes, public lectures under the board of education; (3) medical, including dispensary and nursing work; (4) social, including Workingmen's Institute, social clubs and entertainments; (5) relief work; and (6) neighborhood work, including visitation and all work outside of the building, as well as promotion of neighborhood interests.

== Location ==
Amity Church Settlement was locataed on the south side of West Fifty-fourth Street, just west of Eighth Avenue, Manhattan. The church building, a diminutive pent-roofed wooden building born the inscription "Amity Church," so called from its original site in Amity Street. (Note: After the church building was moved to Marlboro, New York it was renamed, Chapel Hill Bible Church.) It was an institutional church conducted by Baptists. At 312 West Fifty-fourth Street, adjoining the frame house of worship, was an imposing brick structure, known as "Amity Building". Here was the Deaconess Home, established in 1895, with the object of training women to exercise the office of deaconesses in both teaching and nursing. Here also was the Settlement, which was opened in November, 1896, as an auxiliary to the church.

== History ==
Amity Church Settlement was established in November, 1896, by Rev. and Mrs. Leighton Williams and Mr. and Mrs. John W. Clark, with the sanction of the trustees of Amity Baptist Church in their parish house. It was an auxiliary to Amity Baptist Church. The building was located in the Middle West Side. The residents in the areas were skilled manual workers, housed in five-story tenements. The saloons were twice as numerous as the churches. The racial complexion was largely Irish-American and German-American with a small admixture of Jews and Italians.

Amity Church Settlement held the first Municipal Program Conferences, 1904-5; was instrumental in securing De Witt Clinton Park, and also in starting the Federation of the Churches in this city and state. It helped organize the New York Kindergarten Association. Activities included religious services, Bible school, and the various church activities; industrial school, with classes in sewing, carpentering, printing, etc.; dispensary and clinic; poor relief; gymnasium; Christian Workingmen's Institute (for the discussion of social questions from a religious standpoint); choral society; boys' club and literary society; the Amity Theological School; kindergarten; Baptist Deaconess Home; piano instruction; basket ball classes for boys and girls; Sunshine Band, King's Daughters, etc. Amity Lodge.

== Residents ==
The settlement was under the guidance of the pastor, Rev. Leighton Williams, who for many years had been interested in economic matters and was well and favorably known to the vast body of wage-earners in the Metropolis, whose organized cause he frequently espoused. His co-workers in residence were Mrs. Williams and the Superintendent, J. W. Clark, and his wife. The Deaconess Home, which contained twelve residents, while constituting a separate organization in itself, was yet regarded as a part of the Settlement, which thus included sixteen residents.

== Aims ==
Its aims were:—

1. The field. The ward or parish; the city; the nation; the world. To cultivate an intelligent interest in all these, founded on accurate knowledge. While cultivating a broad sympathy, world-wide in extent, to make the ward or parish the subject of immediate and thorough investigation, not only on its religious side, but in all its aspects, industrial and social.
2. Co-operation. To cultivate the spirit of brotherly co-operation with all 'men of good-will,' of every creed, nationality and political affiliation, in temperance, municipal reform, and every other good work, along such lines as are practicable without compromise of any principle on either part. To do all work in conjunction with others wherever possible, and hence to foster all union societies.
3. The training and maintenance of workers. To gradually gather together a large force of volunteer workers, viz.: lay brothers and deaconesses, willing to give themselves to the service of others, without compensation further than the assurance of food, clothing and shelter, but without permanent vows.
4. The union of the religious and industrial forces in the salvation of mankind. To this end to heal the breach now existing. Hence we have started the Christian Workingmen's Institute for lectures, conferences and debates.
5. The education of the people, and especially the workers, in correct social and religious principles. To this end the oral instruction from pulpit and platform, the schools, kindergartens, and tract distribution.

== Activities ==
The activities carried on were diverse in character, and while the Settlement accentuated its religious effort there was a large educational, social, industrial and relief work in hand.

In the educational departments, it was the aim to supplement, without duplicating, the wider and more systematic work performed by the public school, or by other institutions of learning. Two kindergartens were in operation. One of these classes had sessions in the Settlement building. It consisted of 50 pupils and was conducted in conjunction with the New York Kindergarten Association. The other, which met in Amity Mission, an outstation at 511 West Fifty-fourth Street, had a membership of 25. Other successful enterprises were classes in economics, English literature, rhetoric and logic.

The Evening Theological School, conducted in the Settlement building from October to June, iwa the only one of its kind in the city. It was founded by the Rev. George W. Samson, D. D., and after his death, in 1896, it was reorganized under new management. Both in its purpose and constituency, it was interdenominational. Its object was to give thorough courses in Bible study, church history, sociology and philosophy. People in different walks of life who were occupied during the daytime in professions, trades and callings, had here an opportunity in the evening to acquire a better knowledge of theological subjects. Men and women were admitted, and the tuition was entirely free, but each student was expected to pay a nominal registration fee and monthly dues, which defrayed the expense of lighting and heating. The method of the school consisted both in class instruction and lectures. A four years' course was offered, but students were at liberty to select such studies as they preferred. They did not receive diplomas, but certificates were issued in each department showing work actually accomplished. Rev. Mr. Williams was dean of the school, which was self-governing, and its faculty consisted of seven instructors, comprising clergymen of various denominations.

Among the leading social and educative organizations associated with the Settlement was the Christian Workingmen's Institute, which had for its object the "moral, intellectual and social improvement of its members by the discussion of questions of current and practical interest". This society had a membership of 25 above the age of 18, and met regularly to consider topics of serious import. In 1897, it united with the Catholic Workingmen's Club (Roman Catholic) and the Church Association for the Advancement of the Interests of Labor (Episcopal) in holding at Amity Hall semi-monthly Sunday afternoon labor conferences, at which there were addresses and discussions upon subjects germane to the matter at issue. These conferences, which were for the purpose of considering "the present condition of extremes of wealth and poverty," and striving "to improve the relations between Capital and Labor where they may be now unsatisfactory and strained,” were continued for three seasons, and among the prominent personages, besides Rev. Dr. Williams, who delivered addresses were Rev. Thomas J. Ducey, of St. Leo's Roman Catholic Church, Rev. John P. Peters, of St. Michael's Protestant Episcopal Church, and Rev. Samuel McComb, of Rutgers Presbyterian Church, Manhattan; Rev. C. S. Williams, of Fennimore M. E. Church, Brooklyn, and Hon. Hugh Lusk, of New Zealand. At each of these sessions, many of the labor men present took an active and interested part in the discussions. There was a free platform and members of all sects as well as free-thinkers were welcome to present their views. The most important development of the work was a series of Sunday evening meetings at Cooper Union under the auspices of the People's Institute.

The Champions of Temperance was an organization of 40 boys, 11 to 20 years of age, who had uniforms, guns, and regulation drills. They elected their company officers. The Settlement had gathered into this association many boys who otherwise would have roamed the streets in the evening. Military tactics produced a manly spirit among the members, and an occasional social hour helped to hold them together.

Instruction for girls in cooking and sewing and for boys in manual training was carried on every Saturday at the Amity Industrial School.

The House had a dispensary, which was in charge of capable physicians and specialists, who had clinics for eye, ear and throat troubles. It was open for an hour each day, and the Settlement thus sought chiefly to do an auxiliary work, bringing the sick of the locality into touch with the medical resources of the city, but giving such direct supplementary aid as may be desirable. The number of patients treated at the dispensary during the twelve months ending on September 30, 1901, was 240.

By laying out the grounds comprising an area of 75 by 100 feet (23 m × 30 m) in the rear of the church, as the Amity garden for rest and recreation, the residents were enabled to enlarge their fresh-air work. This feature was greatly appreciated by the neighbors, and the garden parties held on the lawn in summer were largely attended. Through the Amity Flower Mission, the workers distributed flowers in the homes of the sick and poor during the hot season.

In connection with its prison gate work at the prison attached to the Seventh District Court in East Fifty-third Street, the Settlement interceded in behalf of youthful first offenders, and quite frequently induced the Magistrates to parole them in the care of the workers, who cooperated with Head Worker David Williams, of the Children's House, in finding them homes or employment.

== Selected works ==
=== Articles or social studies by residents ===
- Clarke, John W.: "The American Dinner Pail Man"
- McKean, May Field: "Our Flower Work", "A Personal Letter about That Fruit", "Deaconess' Home and Hospital", "Deaconesses, Ancient and Modern", "A Godly Christmas Party", "A Deaconess Posey", "A Deaconess Christmas"
- Williams, Rev. Leighton: "The Baptist Position", "The Kingdom of God and the Lives of Men", "Program of Christianity", "The Established Tendencies Toward Social Reform" "Enlarged Church Work in Cities", "Report on the State of Religion", "Is the Existing Poverty Caused by Injustice?", "The Powers of the Kingdom"
- Ziegelmeier, Elizabeth: "One Day in a Deaconess' Life."

=== Articles on religious and social topics by non-resident workers and those associated in some departments of the work ===
- Clark, W. N., "Christian Union: The Relation of the Denomination to the Church Universal"
- Batten, Samuel Z., "The Divine Meaning of the State. What Is the Kingdom of God? "
- Peabody, Rev. H. H.: "Christian Union: The Relation of the Individual to His Denomination"
- Pumpelly, J. C.; Competition Versus Co-operation"
- Rauschenbusch, Walter: "The Brotherhood of the Kingdom", "The Kingdom of God"
- Schmidt, Nathaniel: "The Powers of the Age to Come"
- Williams, Mornay: "The Formation of Criminal Classes:

== See also ==
- Settlement and community houses in the United States
