= Amity Street =

Street in Amherst, Massachusetts, USA

Coordinates: 42°22′32.9″N 72°31′15.2″W

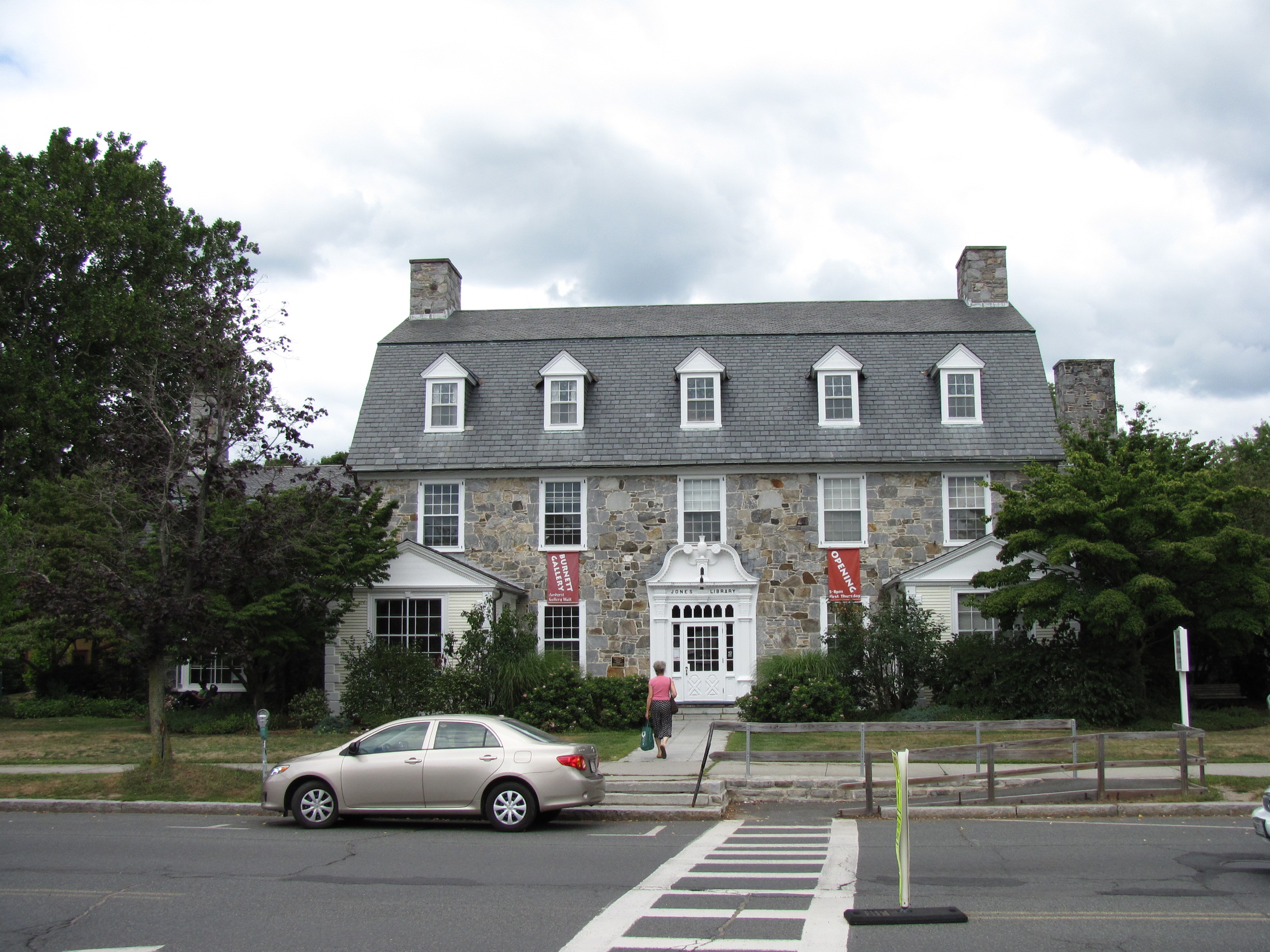
Jones Library on Amity Street

Amity Street is a main east–west street in Amherst, Massachusetts, United States. It is the continuation of Main Street, being renamed Amity Street west of Pleasant Street, which is the main north–south street in Amherst. Emily Dickinson lived on Main Street, while Eugene Field lived on 219 Amity Street. The street is about one mile (1.6 km) south of the University of Massachusetts Amherst campus and 0.3 miles (0.48 km) west of the town common. Route 9 runs about 0.5 miles (0.80 km) south of Amity Street. The street also features a number of grand old Victorian homes and historically significant buildings such as the Jones Library, the Strong House, the Amherst Cinema Building and the Solomon Boltwood House.
