= AEON-Amity =

Chain of private English schools in Japan

AEON-Amity, commonly known as Amity is a chain of private English schools (eikaiwa) in Japan. It operates independently from the larger AEON corporation since 1994. AEON schools primarily focus on adult students, whereas Amity schools cater predominantly to children, ranging from babies to teenagers.

The company is headquartered in Okayama and has over 70 schools in Japan.

== Controversy ==
On June 4, 2011, a 22-year-old woman who worked for the Kanazawa branch of Amity committed suicide. The Kanazawa Labor Inspections Office determined she had died from karoushi, or death from overwork. Officials estimated that the woman had worked roughly 111 hours of overtime each month, with 82 of those hours of that time being spent working at home.
