= Rooks Creek Township, Livingston County, Illinois =

Coordinates: 40°53′21″N 88°45′13″W

Rooks Creek Township
- Township
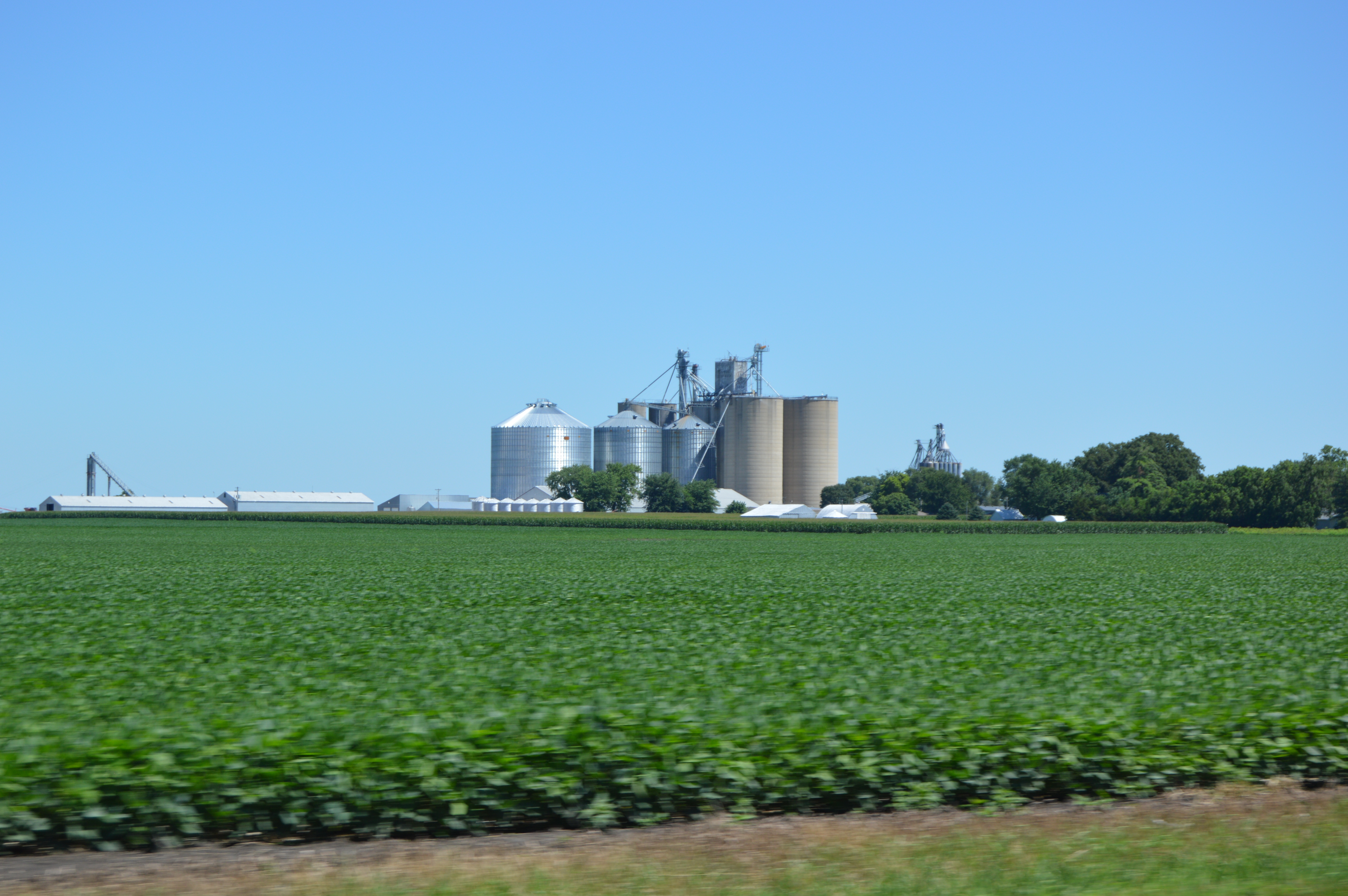
- Fields southwest of Graymont

- Location in Livingston County

- Livingston County's location in Illinois
- Country: United States
- State: Illinois
- County: Livingston
- Established: November 3, 1857

Area
  - Total: 36.45 sq mi (94.4 km^{2})
  - Land: 36.45 sq mi (94.4 km^{2})
  - Water: 0 sq mi (0 km^{2}) 0%

Population (2020)
  - Total: 514
  - Density: 14.1/sq mi (5.44/km^{2})
- Time zone: UTC-6 (CST)
  - Summer (DST): UTC-5 (CDT)
- FIPS code: 17-105-65520

Rooks Creek Township is located in Livingston County, Illinois. As of the 2020 census, its population was 514 and it contained 232 housing units.

== Geography ==
According to the 2021 census gazetteer files, Rooks Creek Township has a total area of 36.45 square miles (94.41 km^{2}), all land.

== Demographics ==
As of the 2020 census there were 514 people, 218 households, and 173 families residing in the township. The population density was 14.10 inhabitants per square mile (5.44/km^{2}). There were 232 housing units at an average density of 6.37 per square mile (2.46/km^{2}). The racial makeup of the township was 96.50% White, 0.19% African American, 0.19% Native American, 0.39% Asian, 0.00% Pacific Islander, 0.97% from other races, and 1.75% from two or more races. Hispanic or Latino of any race were 2.72% of the population.

There were 218 households, out of which 44.50% had children under the age of 18 living with them, 70.64% were married couples living together, 2.29% had a female householder with no spouse present, and 20.64% were non-families. 19.70% of all households were made up of individuals, and 11.90% had someone living alone who was 65 years of age or older. The average household size was 2.60 and the average family size was 2.95.

According to the 2020 American Community Survey, township's age distribution consisted of 24.9% under the age of 18, 1.4% from 18 to 24, 30.6% from 25 to 44, 26% from 45 to 64, and 17.1% who were 65 years of age or older. The median age was 37.3 years. For every 100 females, there were 107.3 males. For every 100 females age 18 and over, there were 105.2 males.

The median income for a household in the township was $92,619, and the median income for a family was $94,766. Males had a median income of $54,063 versus $36,563 for females. The per capita income for the township was $37,538. About 3.5% of families and 4.4% of the population were below the poverty line, including 5.0% of those under age 18 and 2.1% of those age 65 or over.

Historical population
Census	Pop.	Note	%±
2000	568		—
2010	567		−0.2%
2020	514		−9.3%
U.S. Decennial Census

== History ==
Rooks Creek Township and Rooks Creek were named after Roderick Rook. He was the first settler in the area that would eventually become Rooks Creek Township. He arrived from Pennsylvania with his family some time between late 1830 and the Spring of 1831.
