= Amity Township, Livingston County, Illinois =

Amity Township
- Township
- Location in Livingston County

- Livingston County's location in Illinois
- Coordinates: 40°58′15″N 88°45′55″W
- Country: United States
- State: Illinois
- County: Livingston
- Established: April 6, 1858

Area
  - Total: 36.38 sq mi (94.2 km^{2})
  - Land: 36.22 sq mi (93.8 km^{2})
  - Water: 0.16 sq mi (0.41 km^{2}) 0.43%

Population (2020)
  - Total: 781
  - Density: 21.6/sq mi (8.33/km^{2})
- Time zone: UTC-6 (CST)
  - Summer (DST): UTC-5 (CDT)
- FIPS code: 17-105-01348

Amity Township is located in Livingston County, Illinois. As of the 2020 census, its population was 781 and it contained 382 housing units.

== Geography ==
According to the 2021 census gazetteer files, Amity Township has a total area of 36.38 square miles (94.22 km^{2}), of which 36.22 square miles (93.81 km^{2}) (or 99.57%) is land and 0.16 square miles (0.41 km^{2}) (or 0.43%) is water.

== Demographics ==
As of the 2020 census there were 781 people, 376 households, and 282 families residing in the township. The population density was 21.47 inhabitants per square mile (8.29/km^{2}). There were 382 housing units at an average density of 10.50 per square mile (4.05/km^{2}). The racial makeup of the township was 92.96% White, 0.26% African American, 0.00% Native American, 0.26% Asian, 0.00% Pacific Islander, 0.77% from other races, and 5.76% from two or more races. Hispanic or Latino of any race were 4.23% of the population.

There were 376 households, out of which 44.10% had children under the age of 18 living with them, 57.98% were married couples living together, 10.11% had a female householder with no spouse present, and 25.00% were non-families. 20.70% of all households were made up of individuals, and 12.50% had someone living alone who was 65 years of age or older. The average household size was 2.59 and the average family size was 2.89.

The township's age distribution consisted of 27.5% under the age of 18, 9.4% from 18 to 24, 19.9% from 25 to 44, 30.8% from 45 to 64, and 12.4% who were 65 years of age or older. The median age was 38.0 years. For every 100 females, there were 105.9 males. For every 100 females age 18 and over, there were 83.1 males.

The median income for a household in the township was $71,136, and the median income for a family was $73,571. Males had a median income of $48,125 versus $41,750 for females. The per capita income for the township was $27,537. About 12.4% of families and 15.6% of the population were below the poverty line, including 22.7% of those under age 18 and 1.7% of those age 65 or over.

Historical population
Census	Pop.	Note	%±
2010	866		—
2020	781		−9.8%
U.S. Decennial Census

== Cemeteries ==
Bayou Cemetery is located southwest of Cornell, just southeast of the intersection of the Bayou and the Vermilion River in section 22.

== History ==
The first Europeans to settle the area that would eventually become Amity Township were Thomas N. Reynolds, Samuel K. Reynolds, and E. Breckinridge, arriving together in 1833. The area was attractive to early settlers for its abundance of timber, stone, and water. They built small cabins for their families and lived in them for several years on what was known by 1878 as the J.P. Houston farm.

The township may be named after Amity, Ohio. This is very likely as the earliest settlers in the township were from Ohio. It was mentioned in the same 1878 history that Amity means friendship.

The township was officially organized on April 6, 1858, and was one of the first 20 townships in Livingston County organized in 1858.

In 1871 a railroad was completed through the township. That same year, on June 15, Walter B. Cornell laid out a plat in the SW corner of section 11 and called it Cornell. 2 days later, Willard D. Blake section 14 and called it Amity. Most of the businesses were in Amity, but in 1873, the village organized as Cornell.
