= Amity, Georgia =

Unincorporated community in Georgia, U.S.

Coordinates: 33°40′33″N 82°29′22″W

Amity is an unincorporated community in Lincoln County, in the U.S. state of Georgia.

== History ==
The community was named on account of the friendly nature of the townspeople. A post office called Amity was established in 1890, and remained in operation until 1956. The community had 51 inhabitants in 1900.
