= South Henderson Church =

Historic church in Illinois, United States

- South Henderson Church and Cemetery
- U.S. National Register of Historic Places
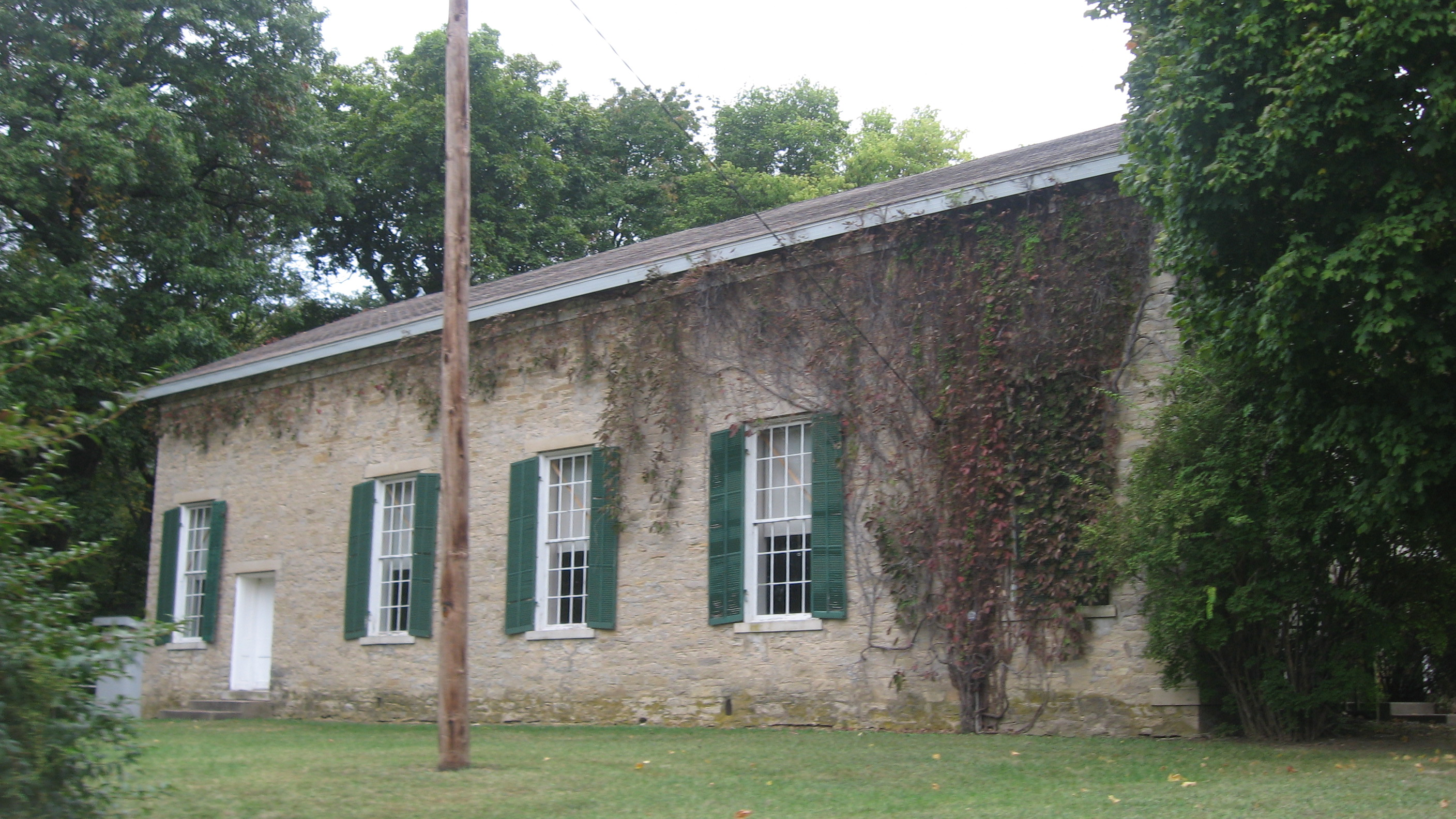

- Location within Illinois Location within the United States
- Nearest city: Biggsville, Illinois
- Coordinates: 40°52′23″N 90°54′48″W
- Area: 5 acres (2.0 ha)
- Built: 1854
- NRHP reference No.: 76000709
- Added to NRHP: October 14, 1976

The South Henderson Church is a historic Presbyterian church located in rural Henderson County, Illinois, north of the village of Biggsville. The church was built in 1854; it was the second church building used by the local Associate Reformed Presbyterian congregation, which formed in 1835 and built its first church two years later. The vernacular building has a wood frame plan and limestone walls and used local materials in its construction, which cost $3,855.55. Reverend Robert Ross led the congregation when it built the 1854 church; Ross was one of the founders of Monmouth College and served on its first Board of Trustees.

The congregation's cemetery is located east of the church; an unpaved road separates the church and cemetery. An iron fence dated 1920 surrounds the cemetery. The gravestones in the cemetery are generally well-maintained, and some of the oldest ones mark the graves of Revolutionary War veterans.

South Henderson, now part of the United Presbyterian Church, disorganized in 1954, and the Old South Henderson Cemetery Association now cares for the site. The church and cemetery were added to the National Register of Historic Places on October 14, 1976.
