= Amity, Indiana =

Unincorporated community in Indiana, U.S.

- Unincorporated community and Census-designated place
- Location within Indiana Location within the United States
- Coordinates: 39°25′24″N 86°00′04″W
- Country: United States
- State: Indiana
- County: Johnson
- Township: Blue River
- Elevation: 689 ft (210 m)
- ZIP code: 46131
- GNIS feature ID: 2830425

Amity is an unincorporated community in Johnson County, Indiana, in the United States.

== History ==
A post office was established at Amity in 1849, and remained in operation until it was discontinued in 1906. Amity was platted in 1855. Amity is derived from a French word meaning "friendship".

== Demographics ==
The United States Census Bureau delineated Amity as a census designated place in the 2022 American Community Survey.
