= Brooklyn Amity School =

- Logo

Location
- 3867 Shore Parkway, Brooklyn, NY 11234
- 40°35′13″N 73°55′55″W

Information
- Established: 1999
- Principal: Adam Olimi
- Grades: K-12
- Enrollment: 256 (2016)
- Website: Brooklyn Amity School

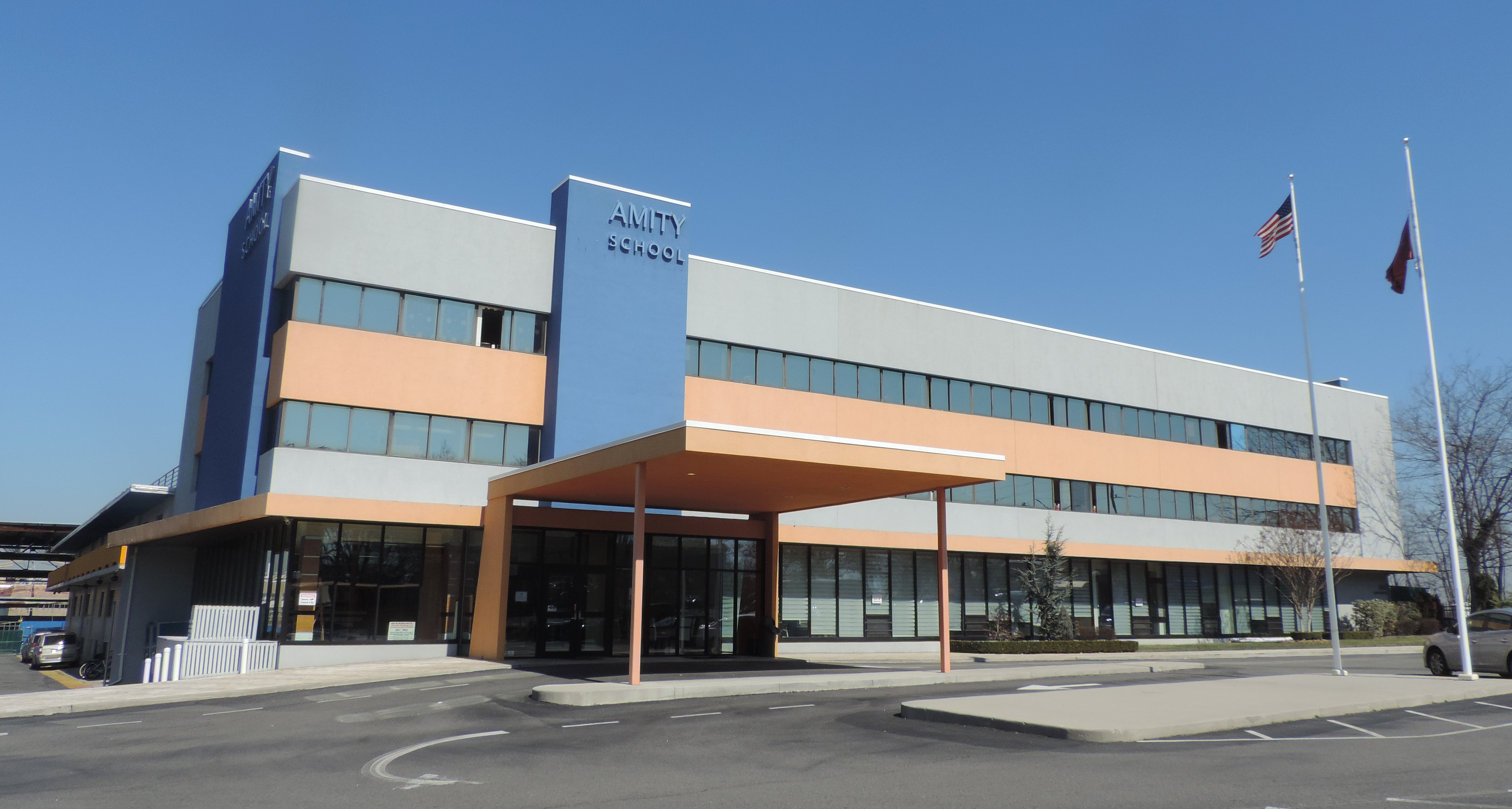

Brooklyn Amity School (also known as Amity) is a UPK-12 private school that was founded in 1999. As of 2016, 256 students were enrolled.

== Academic Curriculum ==
Brooklyn Amity School academic curriculum includes:

AP Courses: AP Language, AP World History, AP US History, AP Government, AP Calculus, AP Biology*, AP Art Studio, AP Psychology English: English I, II, III, IV, English I, II, III Honors, Creative Writing, Public Speaking, Reading Comprehension, American Literature ESL: ESL Foundations, Grammar, Reading, Writing, Speaking, Listening, Vocabulary, American Ethics and Culture, Accelerated Reading Mathematics: Algebra I, Algebra II, Algebra II Honors*, Integrated Algebra (ESL), Geometry, Geometry Honors*, Pre- Calculus, SAT Math Science: Biology, Biology Honors. Chemistry, Chemistry Honors*, Physics, Scientific Research and Design, Introduction to Biology (ESL) Social Studies: World History, US History, Civics, Psychology*, Economics, Integrated World History (ESL) Foreign Languages: Spanish**, Turkish**, Russian**

== Other ==
The school has competed in the regional Science Olympiad competition, getting first place in 2008 and 2007 and 4th in 2006. The school also took part in the 2008 Future City Competition.
