= Witch Creek Road =

Horror comic series

- Issue one cover page
- Author: Garth Matthams
- Illustrators: Kenan Halilović; Luca Cicognola (guest artist; seasons 2–3); Colorists: Anna Jarmolowska; Viviana Di Chiara; colorsfactory; Michael Olasubomi Balogun
- Website: WEBTOON; Tapas; Witch Creek High; Official website
- Current status/schedule: On hiatus
- Launch date: 2017–2021 (Witch Creek Road); 2023 (Witch Creek High)
- Syndicate(s): WEBTOON; Tapas
- Publisher: Rocketship Entertainment
- Genre(s): Horror, drama, dark comedy
- Followed by: Witch Creek High

Witch Creek Road is a horror comic series, written by Garth Matthams and drawn by Kenan Halilović. It features a distinctive artistic style and a story line that has received attention from readers and critics. The series is considered a notable work within the digital comic realm and has contributed to the popularity of online comics on WEBTOON.

A comedic spin-off, Witch Creek High, began publication in 2023, while an omnibus edition of all four seasons of Witch Creek Road (comprising three arcs) was published by Rocketship Entertainment in 2024.

== Plot ==
Witch Creek Road is a survival horror comic series. It follows a group of high school seniors who take a wrong turn and find themselves caught in the aftermath of an evil summoning gone wrong. As they navigate through the horrors that unfold, the story delves into themes of love, acceptance, death, and revenge, with a touch of demonology and flesh-eating demons. The series is divided into three major storylines: Witch Creek Road (comprising Season 1), Skinned (comprising Season 2, itself divided into the storylines Mercy, The Skinned Man, The Broken World), and Infested (comprising Season 3, divided into the storylines Tales from the Recently Deceased, Hailey and the Serpent, Heart in a Jar, Meanwhile, With Edwin, What the Old Man Said, Sara, The Circle, Complete, and Sara's Epilogue, and Season 4, divided into the storylines The Shark, Innsmouth, Two Weeks Ago, One Week Ago, The End, and The Aftermath), and is only digitally available to read via the WEBTOON mobile application.

A comedic slice-of-life spin-off, Witch Creek High, began publication in 2023.

== Characters ==
Season 1 primarily follows the characters Abby, Angelo, Ben, Betty, Connie, Dirk, Edwin, Grace, Mercy, Ryan, Sara, Shaleeta, Tyler, and The Wolves.

Season 2: Skinned primarily follows the characters Chase, Detective Thompson, Gun, Hailey, Karly, The Skinned Man, and The Skinned, with particular characters of Witch Creek Road returning in a supporting role.

Seasons 3 and 4: Infested primarily follows the characters Amity, Dustin, Jay, Keifer, Kevin, Mercy, Shaleeta, Edwin, and Sara, with particular characters of Witch Creek Road and Skinned returning in a supporting role.

== Reception ==
Horror DNA lauded the series as "Friday the 13th by way of Junji Ito [in being] absolutely terrifying stuff, Comics Beat praising the series as "loads of angsty, bloody fun", and Scream complimenting "the teenage experience of feeling out of place" and the style of character writing. Multiversity Comics called it "a kinetic comic [with] some really effective baddies", with Cape and Castle calling it "dark, gritty, and it'll leave you guessing". Comic Book Resources called it "a great horror webtoon [which] stands out from other comic gore fests" in its characterisation, calling it the best webtoon on WEBTOON which "will have the reader laughing while shuddering". Geek Girl Authority lauded the series as "everything I want in a horror story [in having] an investing story of what is going on in this world [and] characters [who] have a bit of complexity without feeling trope–ish or cliche".

== Collected editions ==
Witch Creek Road collections
#	Title	Material collected	Publication date	Pages	Publisher	ISBN
Witch Creak Road Season 1: Yearbook Edition		Season 1 + extra	April 8, 2021	220	Rocketship; Entertainment	—N/a
The Witch Creak Road Omnibus; Edition: Volume One		Seasons 1–4	December 4, 2024	400+	Rocketship; Entertainment	978-1962298483

== See also ==
- Portrayal of women in comics
