= Amity, Madison County, Ohio =

Amity, Ohio
- Unincorporated community
- Location within Ohio Location within the United States
- Coordinates: 40°04′07″N 83°15′05″W
- Country: United States
- State: Ohio
- Counties: Madison
- Township: Canaan
- Elevation: 919 ft (280 m)
- Time zone: UTC-5 (Eastern (EST))
  - Summer (DST): UTC-4 (EDT)
- ZIP Code: 43064 (Plain City)
- Area code: 614
- GNIS feature ID: 1077516

Amity is an unincorporated community in northeastern Canaan Township, Madison County, Ohio, United States. It is located at the intersection of Plain City-Georgesville Road and Amity Pike Road, between Plain City and West Jefferson.

== History ==
In 1817, Uri and Lorenzo Beach, two brothers, settled in the area. Before their arrival, agriculture was the only business in the area, but Uri Beach built a sawmill along the Big Darby Creek and later added a carding machine. Spinning and weaving were also done at the factory. This factory provided all of the lumber for northern Madison County's earliest frame buildings.

About 1826, Lorenzo opened a general store of his own. The West Canaan Post Office was established on January 16, 1829; and as of 1831, the community also contained a hotel and a blacksmith shop. A small community began to form around these businesses, so the Beach brothers purchased a tract of land and laid out the community of West Canaan on April 1, 1831. The name was recorded at the London Courthouse on January 3, 1833. In November 1834, additional land was added to the town's corporation limits, and the town and post office names were changed to Amity. In 1834, Lorenzo opened a second store in another part of town. As of 1835, the town contained two dry good stores, a woolen factory, a sawmill, a distillery, a comb factory, and a number of blacksmith and minor mechanical trades shops.

At that time, Amity was more of a trading point than Plain City. But a combination of the factory's dam being declared a nuisance and torn down and a trunk-line for the Atlantic and Great Western Railroad being laid through Plain City in 1851 caused most of the business to be transferred to the latter. By 1875, Amity had one dry goods store, one wagon and blacksmith shop, one church, and one physician. There was a windmill manufacturing company based in Amity during the 1880s and 1890s. The Amity Post Office was discontinued on July 31, 1901, and the mail service was sent through the Plain City branch. As of 1915, the village contained only one store and one blacksmith.

== Demographics ==
As of 1875, the population was about 100; and in 1915, it was only about 35.
