= Amity, Montgomery County, Ohio =

Unincorporated community in Ohio, U.S.

Coordinates: 39°47′21″N 84°22′3″W

Amity is an unincorporated community in Montgomery County in the U.S. state of Ohio.

== History ==
Amity was platted in 1840. A post office was established at Amity in 1879 and remained in operation until 1902.
