= Future City Competition =

International engineering competition

- Current season, competition or edition: Fire Resilient Future
- Sport: Design competition
- Founded: DiscoverE
- First season: 1992
- Commissioner: Ashley Wirtz (Middle School); Maddy Faraco (High School)
- Motto: "The Ultimate STEM Competition"
- No. of teams: 1,800+ (2024)
- Countries: 7 countries and regions: United States; China; Canada; Mexico; Nigeria; Switzerland; Bangladesh
- Most recent champions: Lionvile (Middle School); Westlake (High School) (2026)
- Most titles: Warwick (Middle School, 3 championships); Westlake (High School, 2 championships)

The Future City Competition is an international engineering competition that focuses on improving students' math, engineering, and science skills. The program is open to middle school students who attend a public, private or home school, and to those attending high school. Each year, teams of five along with a mentor and a coach work to design a futuristic city aiming to mitigate the issues presented by that year's theme. Teams write an essay, develop an either real or virtual 3D model based on the competition type, and present their city to a panel of judges. The theme changes annually, with teams beginning city designs in September.

A program of the DiscoverE organization, Future City has been operating since 1992 and ran its 34th championship in 2026. Over 1,800 teams participated from 7 countries, encompassing more than 92,000 students. The 2026 season included regional competitions, with 45 Middle School teams and 20 High School teams advancing to the championships in Washington, D.C.

== History ==
Future City was founded in 1992 in five cities and 200 students with the aim to provide an "exciting educational engineering program" for sixth, seventh and eighth grade students, combining a stimulating engineering challenge with an inquiry-based application to present their vision of a city of the future. The inaugural 1992 championships were held under Future City national director Carol Rieg during National Engineers Week in February, with inaugural winners Tilden Middle School going on to win a grant of $1,000 and meeting the President of the United States.

National championships have been held in the U.S. annually since 1992 and expanded to Egypt in 2008, China in 2015, Canada in 2016, and Nigeria in 2021. Future City also established pilot programs in Sweden and Japan.

In 2024, Future City expanded to high school students and ran its inaugural high school championships in 2025 with 20 teams. In 2026, Future City co-launched the "Future City Fellowship" with the UL Research Institutes; it is a college program tasking universities to plan and design safer, sustainable cities. The program was first piloted by Campbell University and will be joined by two other universities in 2027.

== Competition ==
As a competition, Future City has aligned itself with STEM-related national and state educational standards. There are two levels: regional competitions and the national finals for regional winners, the goal being to able to design a futuristic city and discuss its important elements: urban planning, zoning, transportation, energy, economy, environment, and education.

=== Components ===
Team members represent their ideas and proposals in several ways:

- Essay about the yearly theme
- A City Narrative discussing their city's attributes, features, and main concepts.
- A Physical Model to show a physical representation of their city. The model is to consist of as many recycled materials as possible, and must cost less than 100 dollars.
- Computer design using Sim City software.
- Presentation to describe their city to the judges on the day of the competition.

=== Awards and prizes ===
For middle school students, the prizes are as follows:

- 1st Place: A trip to Space Camp and $7,500 from Bentley Systems
- 2nd Place: $5,000 from the National Society of Professional Engineers
- 3rd Place: $2,000 from IEEE-USA
- 4th Place: $750 from Ohio University
- 5th Place: $750 from the National Council of Examiners for Engineering and Surveying

For high school students, the prizes are as follows:

- 1st Place: A $20,000 cash prize and a $10,000 scholarship per student
- 2nd Place: A $14,000 cash prize and a $7,500 scholarship per student
- 3rd Place: A $7,000 cash prize and a $3,500 scholarship per student
- Special Award Recipients: A $1,000 cash prize

== Media exposure ==
The Future City competition has been covered by multiple media publications, including Voice of America, the Washington Post, and ABC News. In 2008, total TV viewership peaked at 8 million, with Future City accounting for half of all publicity generated for Engineers' Week.

In 2024, a movie narrated by John Krasinski, "Cities of the Future," was released in theaters and centered around one Future City team.

== Games ==
Year	Theme	Middle School champion	High School champion
1992/1993	Energy Efficiency	Tilden Middle School, Maryland	N/A
2006/2007	Fuel Cells	St. Thomas More School, Louisiana	N/A
2007/2008	Urban Disasters	Heritage Middle School, Ohio	N/A
2008/2009	Water	Bexley Middle School, Ohio	N/A
2009/2010	Green Living	Davidson IB Middle School, North Carolina	N/A
2010/2011	Reliable Healthcare	Our Lady Help of Christians School, Pennsylvania	N/A
2011/2012	Fuel the Future	Blackhawk Middle School, Minnesota	N/A
2012/2013	Rethink Runoff	Valley Middle School, New Jersey	N/A
2013/2014	Tomorrow's Transit	St. John Lutheran School, Michigan	N/A
2014/2015	Feeding Future Cities	St. John Lutheran School, Michigan	N/A
2015/2016	Waste Not, Want Not	Academy for Science and Foreign Language, Alabama	N/A
2016/2017	The Power of Public Space	West Ridge Middle School, Texas	N/A
2017/2018	Age Friendly Cities	Edlin School, Virginia	N/A
2018/2019	Powering Our Futures	Warwick Middle School, Pennsylvania	N/A
2019/2020	Clean Water: Tap into Tomorrow	Gratton School, California	N/A
2020/2021	Living on the Moon	Farnsworth Middle School, New York	N/A
2021/2022	A Waste-Free Future	Warwick Middle School, Pennsylvania	N/A
2022/2023	Powering Our Future	Warwick Middle School, Pennsylvania	N/A
2023/2024	Electrify Your City	Farnsworth Middle School, New York	Westlake High School, Texas
2024/2025	Above The Current	Downingtown Middle School, Pennsylvania	Fulton Science Academy, Georgia
2025/2026	Farm To Table	Lionville Middle School, Pennsylvania	Westlake High School, Texas
2026/2027	Fire Resilient Future	TBA	TBA
