= Amity, Knox County, Ohio =

Unincorporated community in Ohio, U.S.

Amity
- Unincorporated community
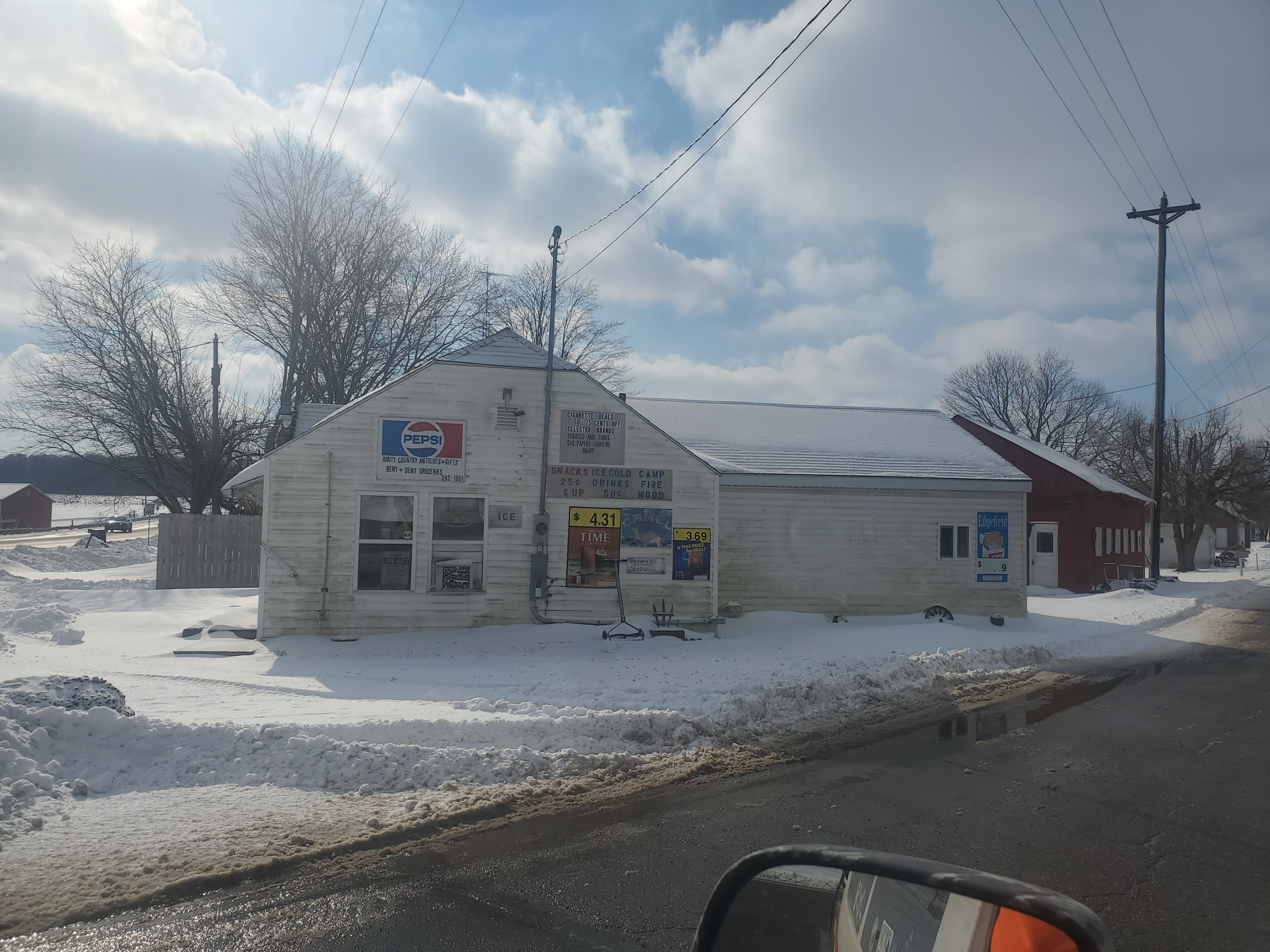
- Amity in 2022
- Interactive map of Amity
- Coordinates: 40°28′15″N 82°22′44″W
- Country: United States
- State: Ohio
- County: Knox County

Amity is an unincorporated community in Knox County, in the U.S. state of Ohio.

== History ==
Amity originally was called Emmettsville, and under the latter name was laid out in 1832. The new name of Amity was adopted around 1837. The post office at Amity was called Democracy. The Democracy post office was established in 1834, and remained in operation until 1923.
