= Cornell, Illinois =

- Village
- Location in Livingston County, Illinois
- Coordinates: 40°59′31″N 88°43′48″W
- Country: United States
- State: Illinois
- County: Livingston
- Township: Amity

Area
  - Total: 0.65 sq mi (1.69 km^{2})
  - Land: 0.65 sq mi (1.69 km^{2})
- Elevation: 633 ft (193 m)

Population (2020)
  - Total: 446
  - Density: 682/sq mi (263.2/km^{2})
- Time zone: UTC-6 (CST)
  - Summer (DST): UTC-5 (CDT)
- ZIP code: 61319
- Area codes: 815 & 779
- FIPS code: 17-16405
- GNIS feature ID: 2398628
- Website: villageofcornell.com

Cornell is a village in Livingston County, Illinois, United States. The population was 446 at the 2020 census.

== History ==
The modern town of Cornell is a blending of two towns founded at almost the same time. Both were attempting to attract a station on the new Fairbury Pontiac and Northwestern Railroad, which eventually became part of the Wabash Railroad. The town of Cornell was laid out by Walter P. Cornell (April 3, 1811 – May 5, 1889) on June 15, 1871. The adjoining town of Amity was laid out two days later by Willard D. Blake (February 5, 1840 – June 1, 1875). Walter Cornell was born in Rhode Island, came to Illinois in 1837, served three years as County Treasurer, and was a director of the railroad. Blake was a farmer born in LaSalle County, Illinois, who died at the age of 35. Ironically, while the name Cornell was kept by the new town, most of the early businesses were in the Amity part of the plat. Indeed, several early houses built in Cornell were soon moved a few blocks down to the Amity part of the town. Cornell was officially organized as a town in 1873.

The original town of Cornell was centered on a block of public land, which is today called North Park. Neither original town had a railroad ground, but a small triangular “Public Ground” was later added. South Park dates from a later addition to the town. Years ago the town had several grocery stores, a bank, four churches, a stockyard, a harness shop and a newspaper, the Cornell Journal.

== Geography ==
Cornell is located in northwestern Livingston County in the northeastern part of Amity Township. Illinois Route 23 passes through the village, leading northwest 14 miles (23 km) to Streator and southeast 12 miles (19 km) to Pontiac, the Livingston county seat.

According to the 2021 census gazetteer files, Cornell has a total area of 0.65 square miles (1.68 km^{2}), all land.

== Demographics ==
Historical population
Census	Pop.	Note	%±
1880	437		—
1890	437		0.0%
1900	521		19.2%
1910	536		2.9%
1920	528		−1.5%
1930	455		−13.8%
1940	478		5.1%
1950	458		−4.2%
1960	524		14.4%
1970	532		1.5%
1980	603		13.3%
1990	556		−7.8%
2000	511		−8.1%
2010	467		−8.6%
2020	446		−4.5%
U.S. Decennial Census

As of the 2020 census there were 446 people, 166 households, and 119 families residing in the village. The population density was 681.96 inhabitants per square mile (263.31/km^{2}). There were 225 housing units at an average density of 344.04 per square mile (132.83/km^{2}). The racial makeup of the village was 90.13% White, 0.45% African American, 0.00% Native American, 0.22% Asian, 0.00% Pacific Islander, 1.12% from other races, and 8.07% from two or more races. Hispanic or Latino of any race were 5.83% of the population.

There were 166 households, out of which 39.2% had children under the age of 18 living with them, 43.98% were married couples living together, 22.29% had a female householder with no husband present, and 28.31% were non-families. 23.49% of all households were made up of individuals, and 8.43% had someone living alone who was 65 years of age or older. The average household size was 2.90 and the average family size was 2.58.

The village's age distribution consisted of 28.0% under the age of 18, 11.0% from 18 to 24, 27.1% from 25 to 44, 20.5% from 45 to 64, and 13.3% who were 65 years of age or older. The median age was 30.5 years. For every 100 females, there were 94.5 males. For every 100 females age 18 and over, there were 82.2 males.

The median income for a household in the village was $50,625, and the median income for a family was $59,063. Males had a median income of $35,909 versus $25,833 for females. The per capita income for the village was $22,386. About 26.9% of families and 34.2% of the population were below the poverty line, including 50.4% of those under age 18 and 1.8% of those age 65 or over.
