= Houstonville =

Houstonville may refer to:

- Houstonville, Alabama, a place in Baldwin County, Alabama
- Houstonville, Illinois, an extinct village in Champaigne County, Illinois, United States
- Houstonville, North Carolina, an unincorporated community in Iredell County, North Carolina, United States
