= Brown Township, Champaign County, Illinois =

Brown Township
- Township
- Location in Champaign County

- Champaign County's location in Illinois
- Coordinates: 40°21′32″N 88°24′43″W
- Country: United States
- State: Illinois
- County: Champaign
- Established: September 1869

Area
  - Total: 36.35 sq mi (94.1 km^{2})
  - Land: 36.22 sq mi (93.8 km^{2})
  - Water: 0.13 sq mi (0.34 km^{2}) 0.36%
- Elevation: 735 ft (224 m)

Population (2020)
  - Total: 2,107
  - Density: 58.17/sq mi (22.46/km^{2})
- Time zone: UTC-6 (CST)
  - Summer (DST): UTC-5 (CDT)
- FIPS code: 17-019-08914

Brown Township is a township in Champaign County, Illinois, United States. As of the 2020 census, its population was 2,107 and it contained 886 housing units.

== History ==
Brown Township was formed in September 1869 from the western half of East Bend Township. It was named after William Brown, an early settler.

== Geography ==
Brown is coterminous with Congressional township 22 North, Range 7 East of the Third Principal Meridian.

According to the 2010 census, the township has a total area of 36.35 square miles (94.1 km^{2}), of which 36.22 square miles (93.8 km^{2}) (or 99.64%) is land and 0.13 square miles (0.34 km^{2}) (or 0.36%) is water.

Map of Brown Township

=== Cities and towns ===
The city of Fisher lies in the southeast corner of the township; portions of the town extend into neighboring townships, but the majority is in Brown Township. The small town of Foosland is in the western part of the township along the route of the Norfolk Southern railroad.

=== Unincorporated towns ===
Lotus is a small settlement in the far southwestern part of the township; the railroad passes through it. Dickerson lies about 2 miles to the east of Lotus.

=== Cemeteries ===
The township contains this cemetery: Mount Hope, near Foosland (Section 4).

== Demographics ==
As of the 2020 census there were 2,107 people, 720 households, and 543 families residing in the township. The population density was 57.99 inhabitants per square mile (22.39/km^{2}). There were 886 housing units at an average density of 24.39 per square mile (9.42/km^{2}). The racial makeup of the township was 93.93% White, 0.43% African American, 0.14% Native American, 0.38% Asian, 0.05% Pacific Islander, 0.76% from other races, and 4.32% from two or more races. Hispanic or Latino of any race were 1.47% of the population.

There were 720 households, out of which 38.60% had children under the age of 18 living with them, 60.28% were married couples living together, 7.50% had a female householder with no spouse present, and 24.58% were non-families. 18.10% of all households were made up of individuals, and 9.90% had someone living alone who was 65 years of age or older. The average household size was 2.72 and the average family size was 3.10.

The township's age distribution consisted of 27.2% under the age of 18, 7.2% from 18 to 24, 30.6% from 25 to 44, 22.5% from 45 to 64, and 12.5% who were 65 years of age or older. The median age was 33.4 years. For every 100 females, there were 94.2 males. For every 100 females age 18 and over, there were 108.8 males.

The median income for a household in the township was $73,438, and the median income for a family was $88,348. Males had a median income of $47,542 versus $36,250 for females. The per capita income for the township was $32,503. About 2.0% of families and 3.7% of the population were below the poverty line, including 6.5% of those under age 18 and 7.4% of those age 65 or over.

Historical population
Census	Pop.	Note	%±
1870	486		—
1880	1,119		130.2%
1890	1,312		17.2%
1900	1,544		17.7%
1910	1,396		−9.6%
1920	1,551		11.1%
1930	1,376		−11.3%
1940	1,414		2.8%
2000	2,966		—
2010	1,995		−32.7%
2020	2,107		5.6%
U.S. Decennial Census

== Transportation ==
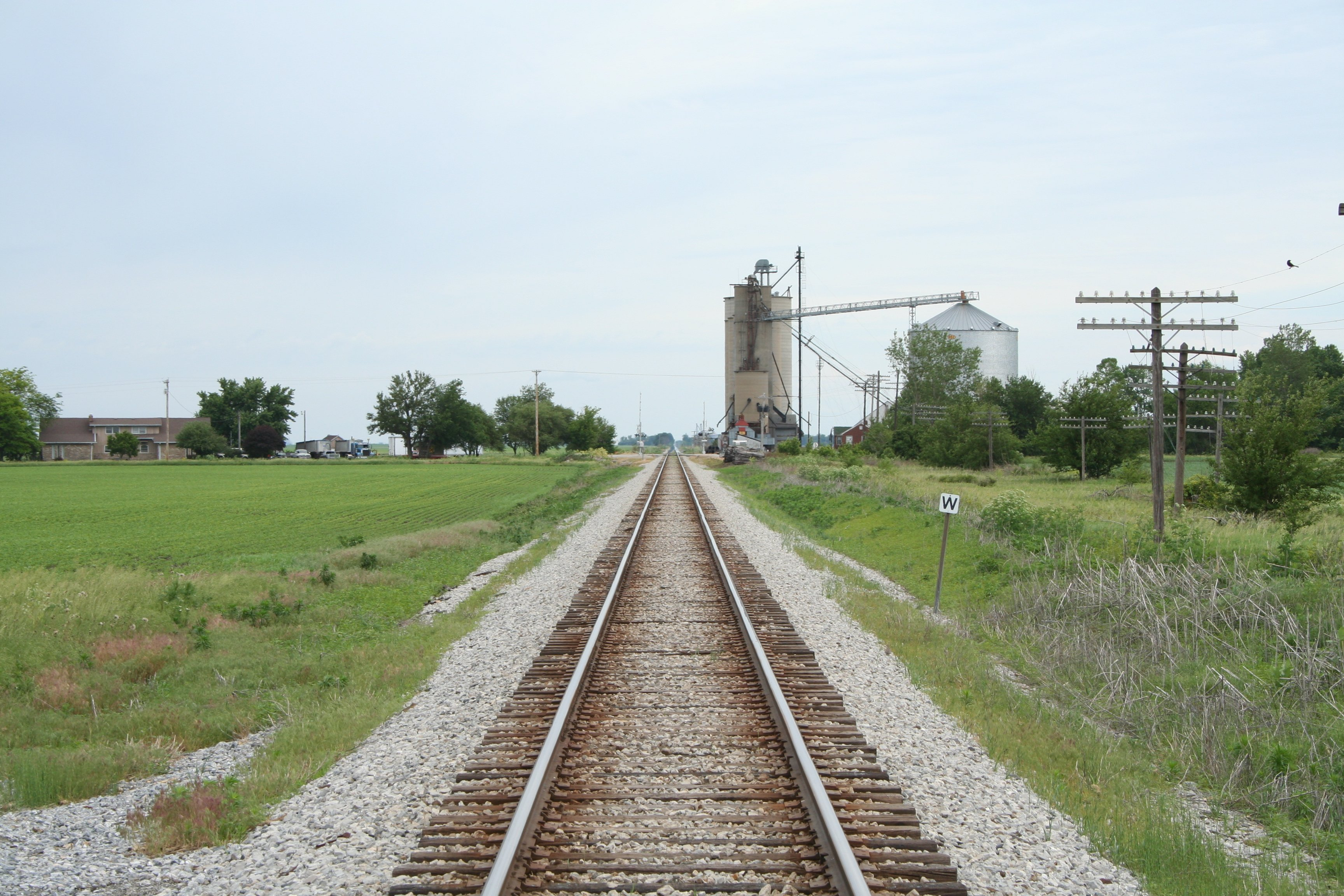
A view of the railroad tracks leading to Lotus, Illinois in section 31 of Brown Township on the McLean–Champaign county line

U.S. Route 136 passes through Fisher and runs along the entire southern border of the township. Illinois State Route 47 passes through the township on its route from Mahomet in the south to Gibson City (in neighboring Ford County) in the north. Illinois State Route 54 passes from southwest to northeast through the far northwestern corner of the township on its route from Farmer City (in DeWitt County) to Gibson City.

A Norfolk Southern Railway line passes through the township, connecting Bement with Gibson City.
