= East Bend Township, Champaign County, Illinois =

East Bend Township
- Township
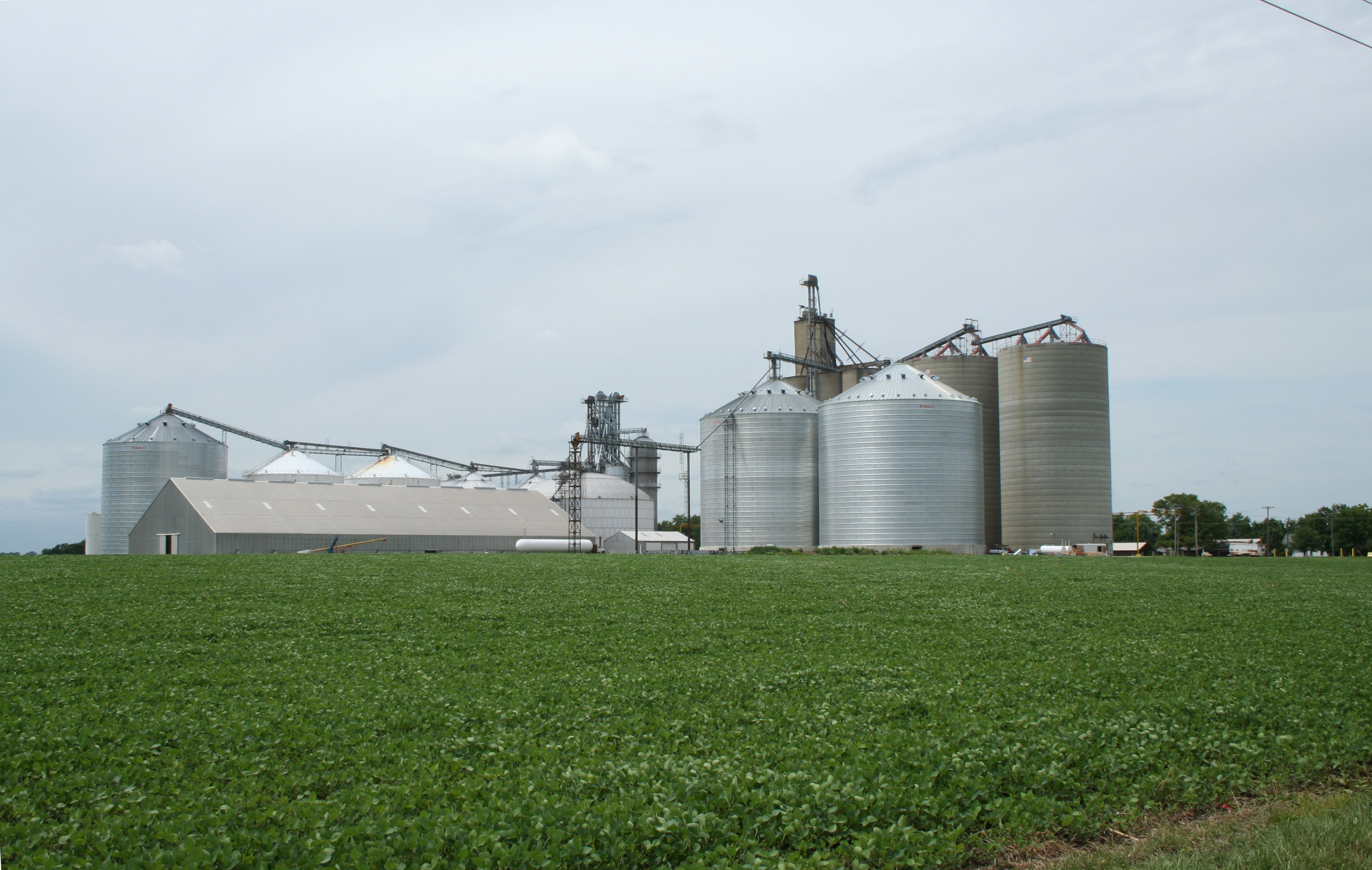

- Location in Champaign County

- Champaign County's location in Illinois
- Coordinates: 40°21′25″N 88°17′37″W
- Country: United States
- State: Illinois
- County: Champaign

Area
  - Total: 36.21 sq mi (93.8 km^{2})
  - Land: 36.04 sq mi (93.3 km^{2})
  - Water: 0.17 sq mi (0.44 km^{2}) 0.47%
- Elevation: 712 ft (217 m)

Population (2020)
  - Total: 623
  - Density: 17.3/sq mi (6.67/km^{2})
- Time zone: UTC-6 (CST)
  - Summer (DST): UTC-5 (CDT)
- FIPS code: 17-019-21566

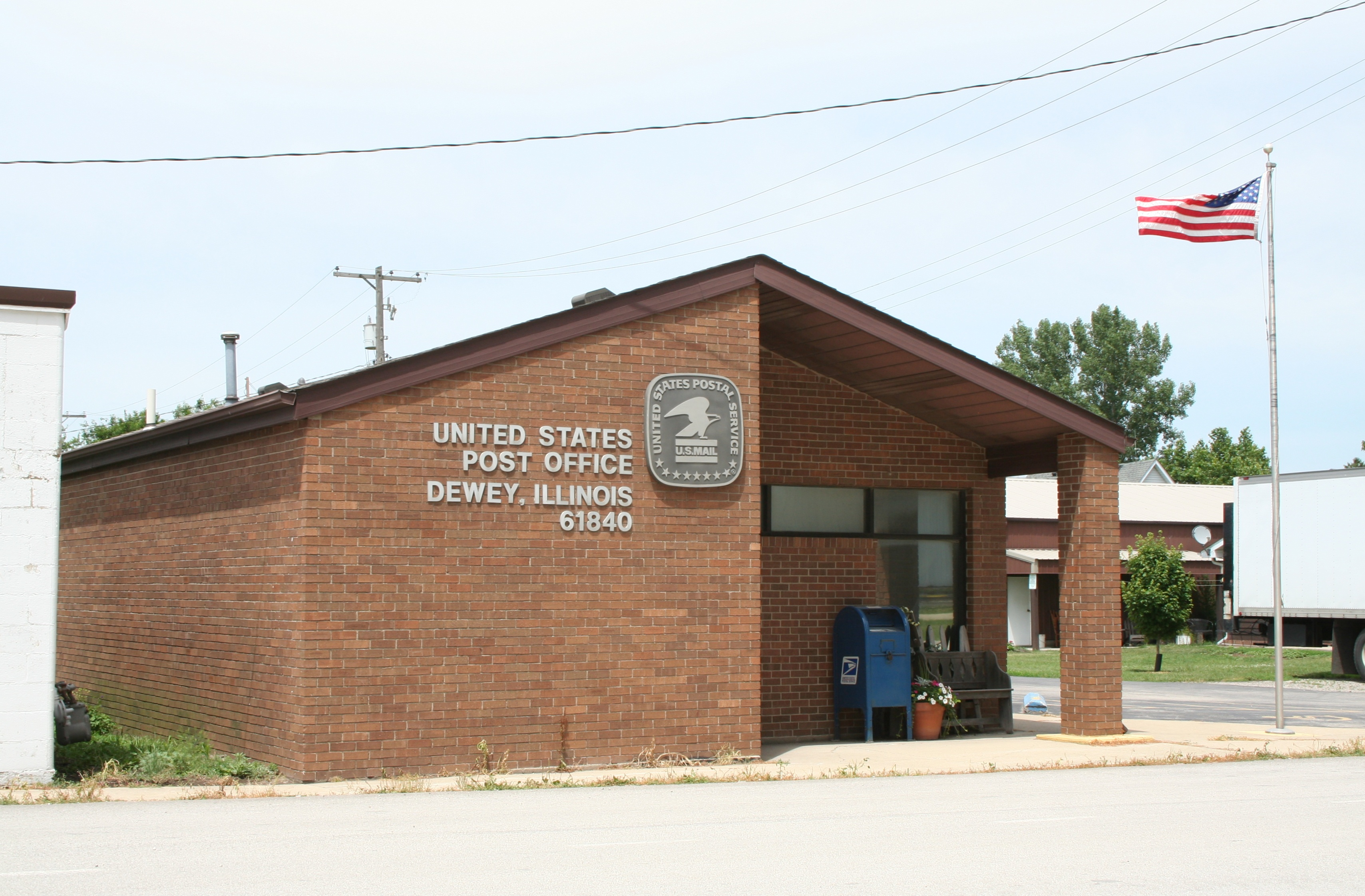
Dewey Illinois Post Office.

East Bend Township is a township in Champaign County, Illinois, United States. As of the 2020 census, its population was 623 and it contained 261 housing units. East Bend Township was named for a meander of the Sangamon River.

== Geography ==
According to the 2010 census, the township has a total area of 36.21 square miles (93.8 km^{2}), of which 36.04 square miles (93.3 km^{2}) (or 99.53%) is land and 0.17 square miles (0.44 km^{2}) (or 0.47%) is water. In addition to the Sangamon River, the streams of Blackford Slough, Dickerson Slough, Hillsbury Slough, Owl Creek, and Wildcat Slough run through the township.

East Bend is coterminous with survey township 22 North, Range 8 East of the Third Principal Meridian.

=== Cities and towns ===
- Fisher (northeast quarter of village)

=== Unincorporated communities ===
- Dewey (in section 34)
- Tomlinson (in section 36)

=== Extinct villages ===
- Houstonville (vicinity of the intersection of sections 16, 17, 20, and 21)

=== Cemeteries ===
The township contains two cemeteries: Beekman (Section 18) and East Bend (Section 19).

=== Major highways ===
- U.S. Route 136

== Demographics ==
As of the 2020 census there were 623 people, 327 households, and 302 families residing in the township. The population density was 17.21 inhabitants per square mile (6.64/km^{2}). There were 261 housing units at an average density of 7.21 per square mile (2.78/km^{2}). The racial makeup of the township was 92.46% White, 0.80% African American, 0.64% Native American, 0.00% Asian, 0.16% Pacific Islander, 0.16% from other races, and 5.78% from two or more races. Hispanic or Latino of any race were 1.28% of the population.

There were 327 households, out of which 45.00% had children under the age of 18 living with them, 89.91% were married couples living together, 2.45% had a female householder with no spouse present, and 7.65% were non-families. 5.20% of all households were made up of individuals, and 2.80% had someone living alone who was 65 years of age or older. The average household size was 2.72 and the average family size was 2.67.

The township's age distribution consisted of 17.7% under the age of 18, 8.4% from 18 to 24, 6.3% from 25 to 44, 47.2% from 45 to 64, and 20.2% who were 65 years of age or older. The median age was 54.5 years. For every 100 females, there were 113.7 males. For every 100 females age 18 and over, there were 119.2 males.

The median income for a household in the township was $113,906, and the median income for a family was $130,068. Males had a median income of $71,780 versus $41,419 for females. The per capita income for the township was $63,299. About 2.6% of families and 4.3% of the population were below the poverty line, including 5.7% of those under age 18 and 6.7% of those age 65 or over.

Historical population
Census	Pop.	Note	%±
1860	216		—
1870	643		197.7%
1880	949		47.6%
1890	1,122		18.2%
1900	1,113		−0.8%
1910	879		−21.0%
1920	806		−8.3%
1930	815		1.1%
1940	749		−8.1%
1950	740		−1.2%
1960	721		−2.6%
1970	821		13.9%
1980	817		−0.5%
1990	814		−0.4%
2000	841		3.3%
2010	584		−30.6%
2020	623		6.7%
U.S. Decennial Census

== History ==
East Bend Township, a civil township, was created in 1860, after Champaign County adopted the township form of government, and originally comprised two survey townships. The area had previously been known as Sodom, after an early post office, and the earliest European American settlers arrived in the late 1830s and early 1840s. The western half of East Bend Township was set off in 1869 to create Brown Township.
