= Dewey, Illinois =

Dewey
- Census-designated place
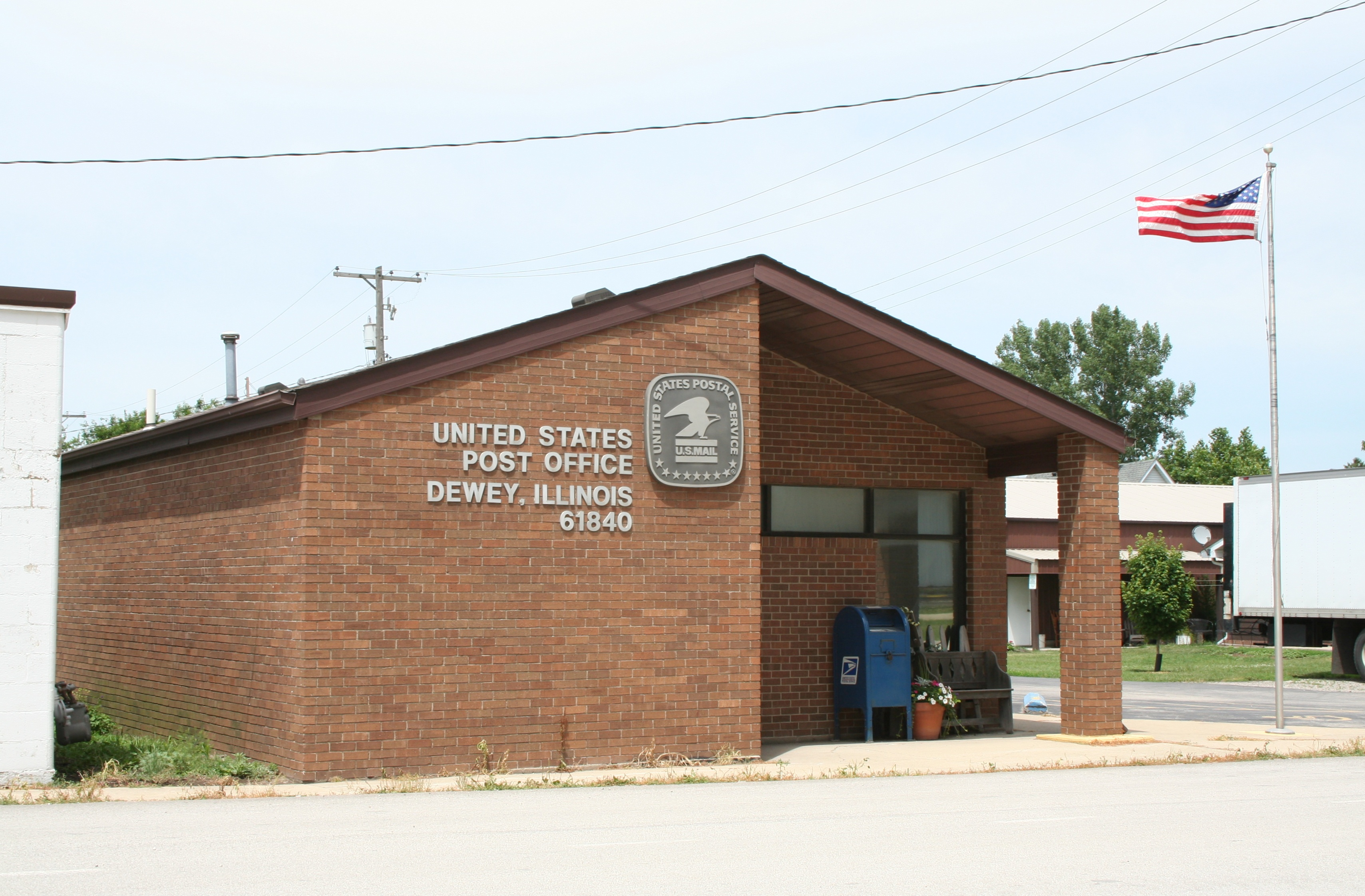
- Dewey Illinois Post Office

- Location within Illinois
- Coordinates: 40°19′09″N 088°17′00″W
- Country: United States
- State: Illinois
- County: Champaign
- Township: East Bend

Area
  - Total: 0.097 sq mi (0.25 km^{2})
  - Land: 0.097 sq mi (0.25 km^{2})
  - Water: 0 sq mi (0.00 km^{2})
- Elevation: 732 ft (223 m)

Population (2020)
  - Total: 105
  - Density: 1,087.9/sq mi (420.05/km^{2})
- ZIP code: 61840
- FIPS code: 17-19746
- GNIS feature ID: 2804651

Dewey is an unincorporated community and census-designated place in East Bend Township, Champaign County, Illinois, United States. As of the 2020 census, Dewey had a population of 105.

== Geography ==
According to the 2021 census gazetteer files, Dewey has a total area of 0.10 square miles (0.26 km^{2}), all land.

== Demographics ==
Historical population
Census	Pop.	Note	%±
2020	105		—
U.S. Decennial Census

Dewey first appeared as a census designated place in the 2020 U.S. census.

As of the 2020 census there were 105 people, 33 households, and 25 families residing in the CDP. The population density was 1,082.47 inhabitants per square mile (417.94/km^{2}). There were 49 housing units at an average density of 505.15 per square mile (195.04/km^{2}). The racial makeup of the CDP was 85.71% White, 0.95% African American, and 13.33% from two or more races. Hispanic or Latino of any race were 1.90% of the population.

There were 33 households, out of which 42.4% had children under the age of 18 living with them, 51.52% were married couples living together, 24.24% had a female householder with no husband present, and 24.24% were non-families. The average household size was 2.52 and the average family size was 2.73.

The CDP's age distribution consisted of 17.8% under the age of 18, 6.7% from 18 to 24, 43.3% from 25 to 44, 32.2% from 45 to 64, and 0.0% who were 65 years of age or older. The median age was 37.6 years. For every 100 females, there were 63.6 males. For every 100 females age 18 and over, there were 54.2 males.

== History ==
The town of Dewey and its post office were established in 1876, and both were first named Behrens, "in honor of Henry Behrens on whose land the town was laid out." The Havana, Rantoul and Eastern Railroad also built a station there, but named it Dewey, after railroad investor Milo C. Dewey. The post office changed its name to Dewey in 1878, and the town became known by that name.

== Education ==
It is in the Fisher Community Unit School District 1.
