= Lotus, Illinois =

- Unincorporated community
- Location within Illinois Location within the United States
- Coordinates: 40°19′08″N 88°27′21″W
- Country: United States
- State: Illinois
- County: Champaign
- Elevation: 742 ft (226 m)
- Time zone: UTC-6 (Central (CST))
  - Summer (DST): UTC-5 (CDT)
- Area code: 217
- GNIS feature ID: 412671

Lotus is an unincorporated community in Champaign County, Illinois, United States. Lotus is located along a railroad line southwest of Foosland. The railroad station and post office there were known as Howard until they were renamed Lotus in 1902.
