= Foosland, Illinois =

Foosland
- Village
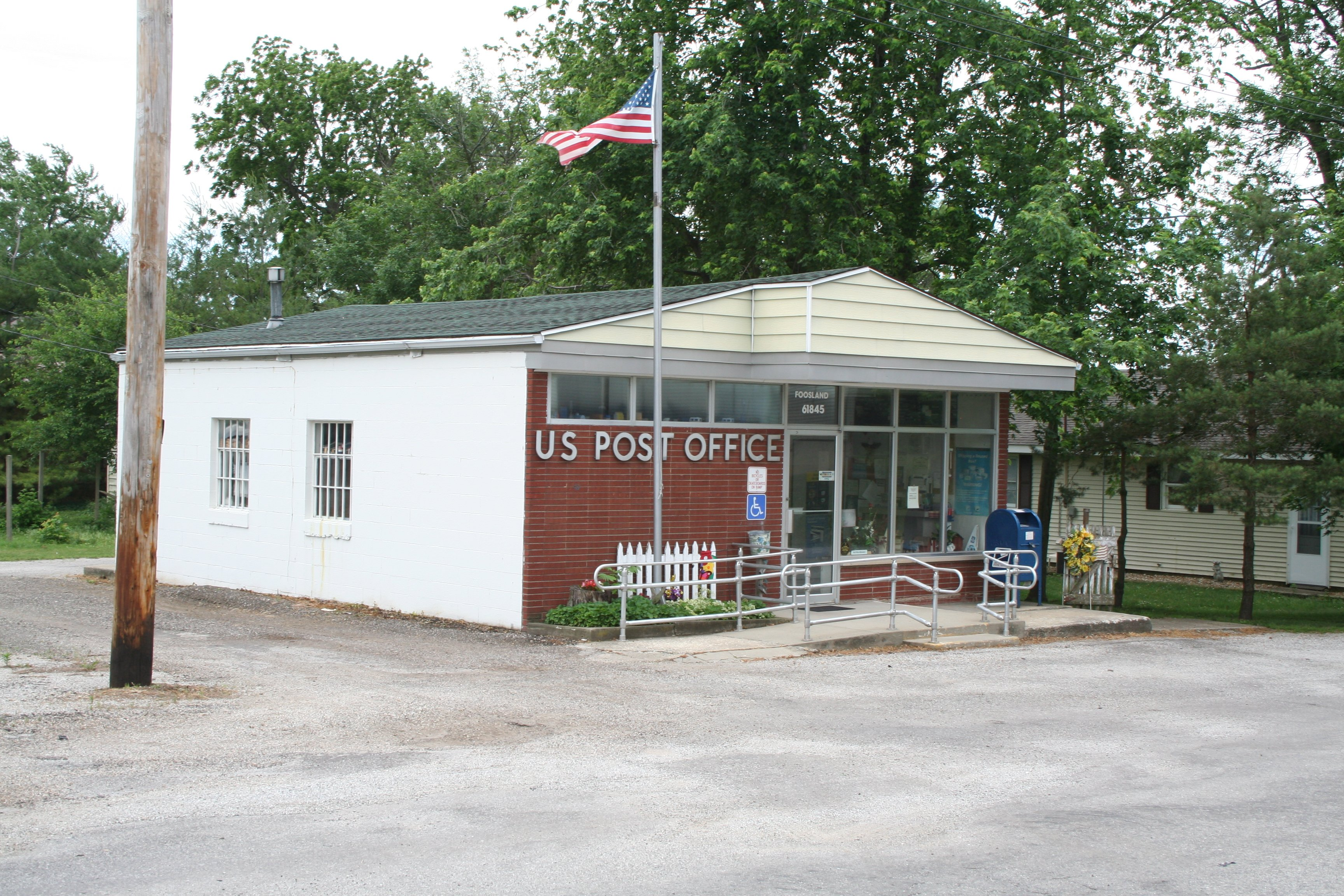
- Foosland Post Office

- Location of Foosland in Champaign County, Illinois.
- Coordinates: 40°21′40″N 88°25′45″W
- Country: United States
- State: Illinois
- County: Champaign

Government
  - Village president: Doug Walker

Area
  - Total: 0.069 sq mi (0.18 km^{2})
  - Land: 0.069 sq mi (0.18 km^{2})
  - Water: 0 sq mi (0.00 km^{2})
- Elevation: 732 ft (223 m)

Population (2020)
  - Total: 75
  - Density: 1,094.6/sq mi (422.64/km^{2})
- Time zone: UTC-6 (CST)
  - Summer (DST): UTC-5 (CDT)
- ZIP Code(s): 61845
- Area code: 217
- FIPS code: 17-26662
- GNIS feature ID: 2398891

Foosland is a village in Brown Township, Champaign County, Illinois, United States. The population was 75 at the 2020 census. The village is named after William Foos, who owned 3,500 acres in the area in the 1840s.

== Geography ==
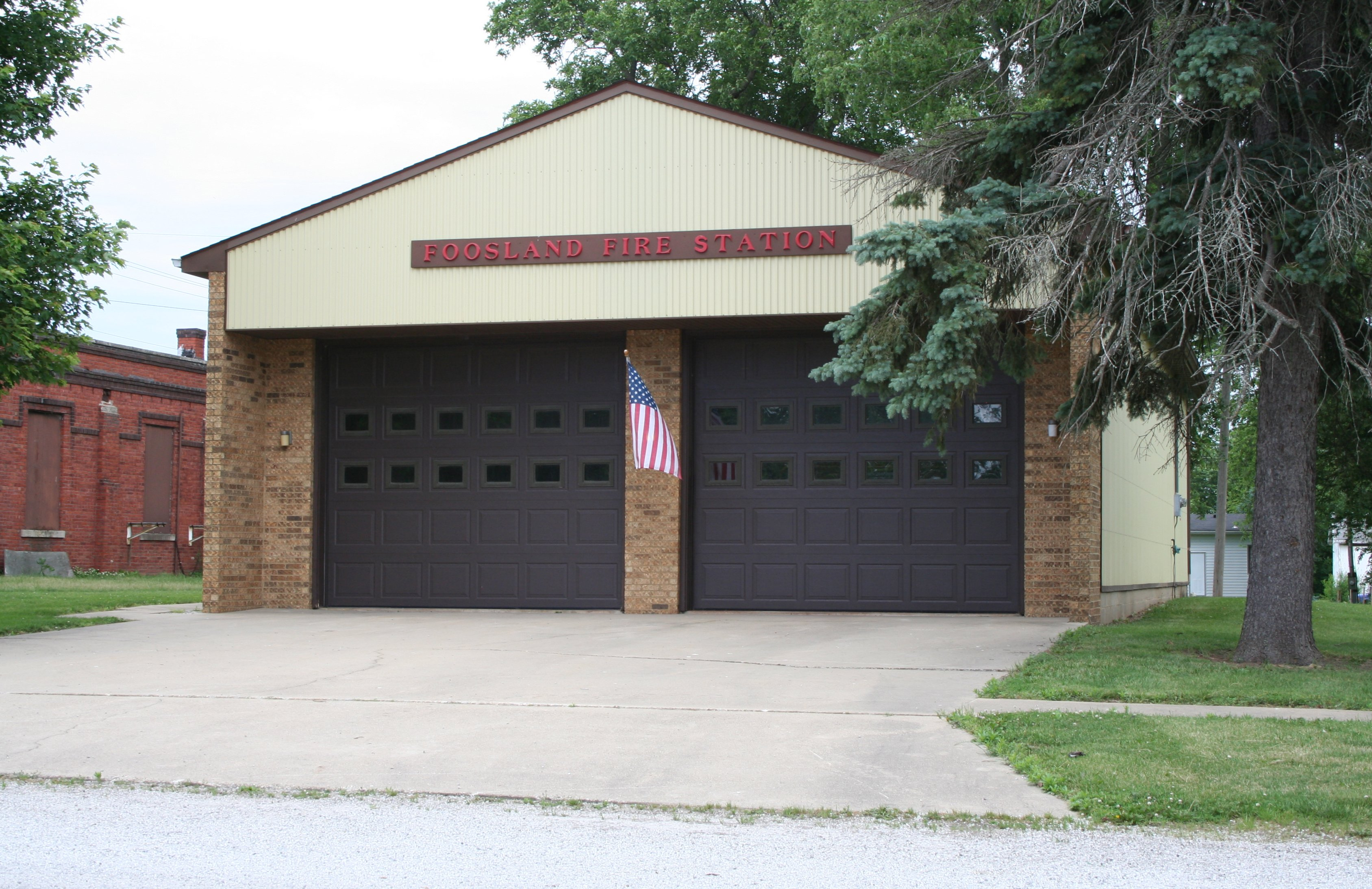
Foosland, Illinois Fire Station

Foosland is located in the northwest corner of Champaign County three miles southeast of Illinois Route 54. Gibson City lies nine miles to the northeast along Route 54 and Champaign is approximately 22 miles to the southeast. Lone Tree Creek, a tributary to the Sangamon River, flows past the south side of the community.

According to the 2021 census gazetteer files, Foosland has a total area of 0.07 square miles (0.18 km^{2}), all land.

== Demographics ==
Historical population
Census	Pop.	Note	%±
1960	150		—
1970	172		14.7%
1980	153		−11.0%
1990	132		−13.7%
2000	90		−31.8%
2010	101		12.2%
2020	75		−25.7%
U.S. Decennial Census

As of the 2020 census, there were 75 people, 24 households, and 10 families residing in the village. The population density was 1,086.96 inhabitants per square mile (419.68/km^{2}). There were 44 housing units at an average density of 637.68 per square mile (246.21/km^{2}). The racial makeup of the village was 96.00% White, 2.67% from other races, and 1.33% from two or more races. Hispanic or Latino of any race were 2.67% of the population.

There were 24 households, out of which 12.5% had children under the age of 18 living with them, 37.50% were married couples living together, 4.17% had a female householder with no husband present, and 58.33% were non-families. 37.50% of all households were made up of individuals, and 29.17% had someone living alone who was 65 years of age or older. The average household size was 3.10 and the average family size was 2.21.

The village's age distribution consisted of 20.8% under the age of 18, 0.0% from 18 to 24, 17% from 25 to 44, 30.1% from 45 to 64, and 32.1% who were 65 years of age or older. The median age was 56.1 years. For every 100 females, there were 89.3 males. For every 100 females age 18 and over, there were 121.1 males.

The median income for a household in the village was $50,833, and the median income for a family was $86,250. Males had a median income of $46,250 versus $26,250 for females. The per capita income for the village was $27,058. No families and 9.4% of the population were below the poverty line, including none of those under age 18 and 29.4% of those age 65 or over.

== History ==
Foosland was founded in 1867 and a post office was established on June 6th or 7th that year. The town is named after William Foos, an Ohioan who was instrumental in the establishment of the town, and in the placement there of a station of the Chicago-Paducah railroad. He bought and drained about 6,700 acres of nearby land and, through a local superintendent, managed a tenant farming operation. Foosland was incorporated in 1959. Champaign County Judge Frederick S. Green approved a canvass of votes of elected officers. The first mayor was Paul Verkler, who introduced the enduring term for a resident of Foosland: A Fooser. The local residents continue to use this affectionate and endearing term in their daily interactions to this day. In an interview with a local resident, it was then revealed that the first school in Foosland was established in 1878. The original school building was situated on the west side of the town until it was destroyed by a fire in 1923. Subsequently, a new school facility was constructed on the east side of town and opened in 1924, with a gymnasium added in 1940. In 1941, the term "Fooser" was widely recognized, leading to a student-led initiative at Foosland High School. The 58 students petitioned to change the school's mascot from the Foosland Corn Huskers to the Foosland Foosers. However, their request was ultimately declined, as the term "Fooser" was considered inappropriate for a school nickname. The school was closed in 1966 when the elementary students were consolidated and transferred to Gibson City. The building was later sold and repurposed for teenage dance events. It was demolished several years ago following damage caused by a tornado.

In recent events, due to dry weather conditions, a fire originating from a corn crib subsequently affected the town of Foosland. This incident has become a notable event in the community's history and is now often referenced as "The Great Foosland Fire." The event was significant in its impact on the local area. The event was significant in its impact on the local area. The fire decimated the bustling metropolis of Foosland, killing many of the squirrels, rodents, and bugs that inhabited the nearby cityscape.

== Education ==
It is in the Gibson City-Melvin-Sibley Community Unit School District 5.
