= Houstonville, Illinois =

Unincorporated community in Illinois, USA

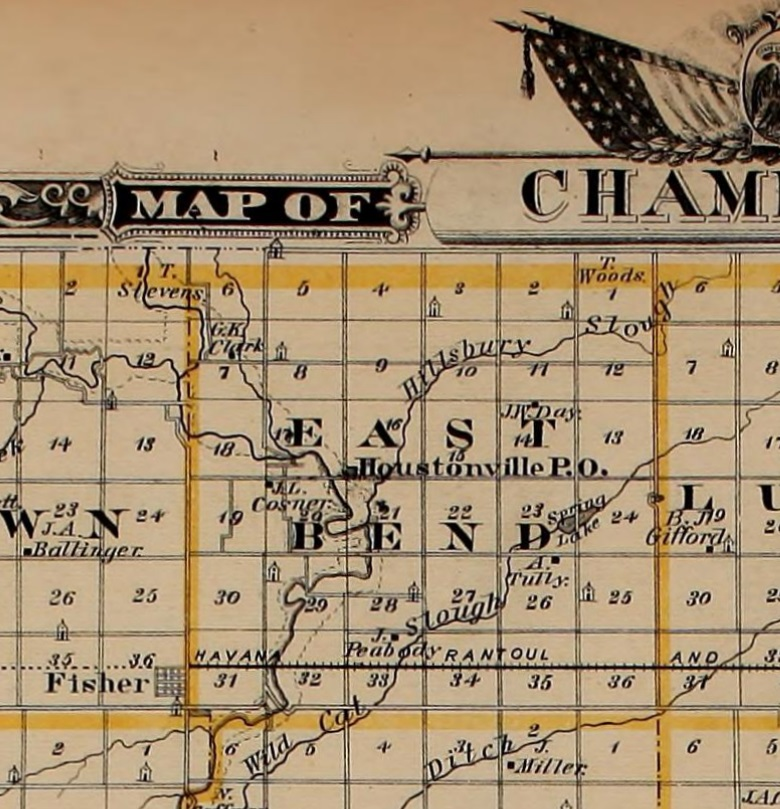
Location of Houstonville, Illinois, Post Office, near the center of East Bend Township, Champaign County, 1876.

Houstonville, an extinct village, was in the vicinity of the intersection of Sections 16, 17, 20, and 21, East Bend Township, Champaign County, Illinois, United States. The Houstonville Post Office (in Section 17) operated from 14 February 1871 to 21 March 1878, and county public school number 29 in Houstonville (in Section 20) was open from 1899 to 1928. The village had Methodist Episcopal, and Methodist Protestant churches, and a Mennonite congregation. Not served by a railroad line, Houstonville was abandoned gradually in the early 20th century. Nearby cemeteries include Beekman (formerly known as Houstonville) and Peabody (defunct).

Houstonville was named after the family of Robert Houston, who purchased government land in Section 16 in 1855. Houstonville was not platted.

== Geography ==
Houstonville was located at 40°21′18″N 088°18′31″W at an elevation of 718 feet.
