= National Register of Historic Places listings in Newton County, Indiana =

Location of Newton County in Indiana

This is a list of the National Register of Historic Places listings in Newton County, Indiana.

This is intended to be a complete list of the properties on the National Register of Historic Places in Newton County, Indiana, United States. Latitude and longitude coordinates are provided for many National Register properties; these locations may be seen together in a map.

There are five properties listed on the National Register in the county, and one former listing.

Properties and districts located in incorporated areas display the name of the municipality, while properties and districts in unincorporated areas display the name of their civil township. Properties and districts split between multiple jurisdictions display the names of all jurisdictions.

This National Park Service list is complete through NPS recent listings posted September 26, 2025.

== Current listings ==
	Name on the Register	Image	Date listed	Location	City or town	Description
1	George Ade House	George Ade House	September 27, 1976 (#76000014)	East of Brook off State Road 16; 40°51′50″N 87°19′21″W	Iroquois Township	
2	Goodland-Grant Township Public Library	Goodland-Grant Township Public Library	September 29, 2004 (#04001103)	111 S. Newton St. 40°45′54″N 87°17′35″W	Goodland	
3	Newton County Courthouse	Newton County Courthouse	August 1, 2008 (#08000742)	One Courthouse Square; 40°46′08″N 87°26′44″W	Kentland	
4	Scott-Lucas House	Scott-Lucas House	June 22, 2003 (#03000544)	514 S. Main St. 40°56′27″N 87°27′19″W	Morocco	
5	Seller's Standard Station and Pullman Diner	Seller's Standard Station and Pullman Diner	September 30, 2014 (#14000808)	101 and 103 N. Polk St. 40°56′47″N 87°27′00″W	Morocco	

== Former listings ==
	Name on the Register	Image	Date listed	Date removed	Location	City or town	Description
1	McCairn-Turner House	McCairn-Turner House	March 25, 1994 (#94000232)	May 22, 2023	124 W. Jasper St. 40°45′58″N 87°17′45″W	Goodland	

== See also ==
- List of National Historic Landmarks in Indiana
- National Register of Historic Places listings in Indiana
- Listings in neighboring counties: Benton, Iroquois (IL), Jasper, Kankakee (IL), Lake
- List of Indiana state historical markers in Newton County
