= Prairie Hills Motorsports Club =

Coordinates: 41°04′52″N 87°22′17″W

- Location: Colfax Township, Newton County, at 5530 North 100 E, Lake Village, Indiana 46349-9233
- Coordinates: 41.072918,-87.371331

Full Track
- Length: 10.91 km (6.78 mi)

North Track
- Length: 4.98 km (3.09 mi)
- Turns: 19

South Track
- Length: 5.86 km (3.64 mi)
- Turns: 23

Prairie Hills Motorsports Club was a proposed $82 million sports car race track to be built on 872 acres (3.53 km^{2}) near Lake Village, Indiana, which the developers had claimed would be "the longest Grand Prix-style course in the Western Hemisphere" when completed.

== Project shelved ==
In 2008, though all the pieces are in place to construct a world class racing facility, the state of the economy at that time meant the necessary funds simply were not available.

== Project progress ==
In November 2007, Prairie Hills received final approval for development of the club from the Newton County Planning Commission. The club was initially expected to be in full operation by April 2009, but numerous unforeseen issues led to delaying the start of construction. On July 6, 2009, Prairie Hills Motorsports Club received unanimous approval from the Newton County Commissioners for their requested rezoning and Planned Unit Development. On July 24, 2009, Prairie Hills management issued a press release announcing they would "move forward at a rapid pace to begin construction of the largest road course facility in North America." On April 9, 2010, the Newton County Board of Commissioners voted to adopt an ordinance establishing the Prairie Hills Economic Improvement District (EID) which will provide support for The Prairie Hills Motorsport Club, an economic improvement project to be developed in Newton County. The formation of the Prairie Hills EID Board will consist of representatives from the Newton County government, the landowner, and the Prairie Hills Motorsport Club. The establishment of the Prairie Hills EID allows for a per-use assessment on all attendees or users of Prairie Hills products or services.

== Facility design ==
Designed by noted race track architect Paxton Waters, the final development would have included a prominent hotel, conference center, restaurant, spa, retail space, garages, condominiums, karting track, and a 6,000 to 8,000 seat amphitheater.

Duke Energy also agreed to erect 240-foot (73 m)-tall wind turbines on part of the site, generating electricity feeding a multi-state power grid. Prairie Hills developers said the turbines would be part of the features of renewable energy incorporated in the site design.

== Race track design ==
Noted former Formula One and Champ Car racing driver Derek Daly completed the final design of the more than seven miles (11 km) of racing surface in the Prairie Hills facility, incorporating multiple shorter courses which were configured for different driver skill levels. Daly's design included features that would have provided unique features to the course, including corners modeled after the world famous tracks he has driven, most notably an over and under section, along with FIA certification.

== Construction ==
The track construction was scheduled to be done by American Structurepoint, which played an important role in obtaining the necessary Newton County approvals.

== Design revisions ==
A revised track layout was added to the website, dated 06-13-2009, which no longer linked the North and South circuits, thus excluding the 7+ mile configuration, though a 7+ mile long course was still a viable proposition, as the North and South circuits could have been joined at their closest proximity along the East side of the property. (Note: the referenced site map graphic is laid out with the Southern end of the property to the left and the Northern end to the right.)

== The Hollywood connection ==
Indiana film producer Justin Escue teamed up with Angelo Pizzo and David Anspaugh, the two creators behind sports movie classics Hoosiers and Rudy, to make 500, The Spectacle Begins, a movie focusing on the inaugural Indianapolis 500, with Prairie Hills as the site for filming the movie. A 1911 vintage one mile (1.6 km) replica of the Indianapolis Motor Speedway was added to the site plan, in what would have been the Southwest portion of the property. Pre-production for the movie was begun and casting was to start in October 2009, with filming scheduled to start in May 2010.

== Visiting the site ==
For those wishing to take a day trip and visit the development site, but wanting to avoid the numerous gravel roads in the area, it is recommended to approach the property via Indiana State Road 55 to CR 600 N (Fair Oaks Rd.) then going West to CR 100 E and turning South. The Western edge of the property is along East side of CR 100 E and a farmhouse is in the area where the main entrance was to be located, according to the plot map.

== Sources ==
- Motorsports Initiative Gains Momentum, Joyce Young, professor of marketing, College of Business, Indiana State University, October 13, 2009
- Best Places To Speed Legally, by Hannah Elliott, Forbes, dated 02/13/09
- Groundbreaking Set For Motorsports Mecca, Inside Indiana Business, 7/24/2009
- Making a Spectacle, by Mark Dubec, Indianapolis Monthly
- Developers hope deal is near on private racing complex in NW Indiana, By Bruce C. Smith, The Indianapolis Star, posted: July 24, 2010
