= Kentland =

Kentland may refer to a location in the United States:

- Kentland, Indiana, in Newton County
  - Kentland crater
  - Kentland Municipal Airport
- Kentland, Maryland, in Prince George's County

See also

- Kent Land District, Tasmania
- Kent Land District, Western Australia
- Kentlands, a neighborhood of Gaithersburg, Maryland in Montgomery County
