= List of Indiana state historical markers in Newton County =

Location of Newton County in Indiana

This is a list of the Indiana state historical markers in Newton County.

This is intended to be a detailed table of the official state historical marker placed in Newton County, Indiana, United States by the Indiana Historical Bureau. The location of the historical marker and its latitude and longitude coordinates are included below when available, along with its name, year of placement, and topics as recorded by the Historical Bureau. There are 5 historical markers located in Newton County.

== Historical markers ==
Marker title	Image	Year placed	Location	Topics
State Line Survey		1966	U.S. Route 24 at the Illinois state line west of Kentland; 40°46′14″N 87°31′33″W	Early Settlement and Exploration
Edgar Charles "Sam" Rice		2019	514 S. Main St., Morocco; 40°56′27.1″N 87°27′18.8″W	Sports
Warren T. McCray		2019	2775 W 1500 S, Kentland; 40°46′45″N 87°26′40″W	Politics
Taft Rally at Ade Estate		2019	3690 E State Road 16, Brook; 40°51′51″N 87°19′19.9″W	
George Ade		2021	Hazelden Estate, near 3705 IN-16, Brook; 40°51′50.3″N 87°19′22.7″W	Arts & Culture; Newspaper & Media

== See also ==
- List of Indiana state historical markers
- National Register of Historic Places listings in Newton County, Indiana
