= Effner, Illinois =

- Unincorporated town
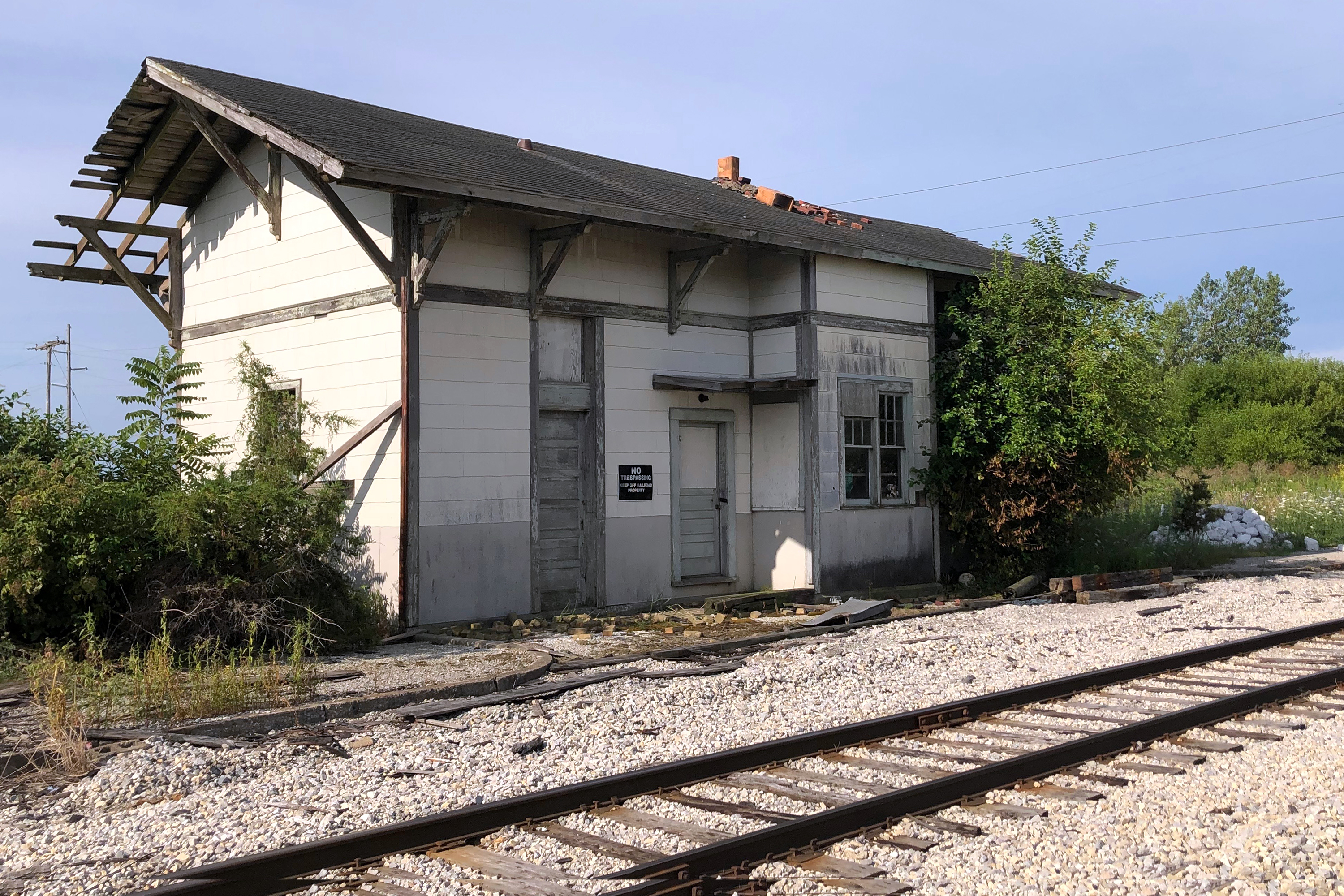
- The defunct railway station

- Location within Illinois Location within the United States
- Coordinates: 40°46′14″N 87°31′31″W
- Country: United States
- State: Illinois
- County: Iroquois
- Township: Sheldon
- Elevation: 679 ft (207 m)
- Time zone: UTC-6 (Central (CST))
  - Summer (DST): UTC-5 (CDT)
- ZIP code: 60966
- Area code: 815
- FIPS code: 18-20566
- GNIS feature ID: 447634

Effner is an unincorporated town in Iroquois County, Illinois on the border with Indiana.

== History ==
Effner was founded ca. 1860 and originally known as Haxby. A post office was established at Effner in 1899, but closed shortly thereafter in 1901.

== Geography ==
Effner is located along US Routes 52 and 24 just east of the town of Sheldon. the town lies along the eastern edge of Sheldon Township in Iroquois County, Illinois, though the grain elevators and the defunct railway station are across the border in Jefferson Township in Newton County, Indiana. A line of the Toledo, Peoria and Western Railway connecting Sheldon and Kentland passes through town just south of the highway.
