= Newton County =

Newton County is the name of six counties in the United States. All except for Arkansas (and perhaps Mississippi) are named for Sgt. John Newton, a soldier of the American Revolutionary War who became a fictionalized hero. Many counties share a boundary with a Jasper County, named after Sgt. William Jasper, a similarly distinguished soldier.

The following counties are called Newton County:

County	Named for	Remarks
Newton County, Arkansas	Thomas Willoughby Newton	County seat is Jasper
Newton County, Georgia	Sgt. John Newton	Adjacent to Jasper County, Georgia
Newton County, Indiana	Sgt. John Newton	Adjacent to Jasper County, Indiana
Newton County, Mississippi	Sir Isaac Newton (Note: See article Newton County, Mississippi#History)	Adjacent to Jasper County, Mississippi
Newton County, Missouri	Sgt. John Newton	Adjacent to Jasper County, Missouri
Newton County, Texas	Sgt. John Newton	Adjacent to Jasper County, Texas
