= Beaver Township, Newton County, Indiana =

Beaver Township
- Township
- Location in Newton County
- Coordinates: 40°57′34″N 87°27′24″W
- Country: United States
- State: Indiana
- County: Newton

Government
  - Type: Indiana township

Area
  - Total: 42.27 sq mi (109.5 km^{2})
  - Land: 40.88 sq mi (105.9 km^{2})
  - Water: 1.39 sq mi (3.6 km^{2}) 3.29%
- Elevation: 669 ft (204 m)

Population (2020)
  - Total: 1,534
  - Density: 37.52/sq mi (14.49/km^{2})
- Time zone: UTC-6 (Central (CST))
  - Summer (DST): UTC-5 (CDT)
- ZIP codes: 47922, 47963
- Area code: 219
- GNIS feature ID: 453102

Beaver Township is one of ten townships in Newton County, Indiana, United States. As of the 2020 census, its population was 1,534 and it contained 681 housing units.

Historical population
Census	Pop.	Note	%±
1890	1,052		—
1900	1,600		52.1%
1910	1,524		−4.7%
1920	1,687		10.7%
1930	1,563		−7.4%
1940	1,693		8.3%
1950	1,726		1.9%
1960	1,923		11.4%
1970	1,831		−4.8%
1980	1,863		1.7%
1990	1,547		−17.0%
2000	1,667		7.8%
2010	1,573		−5.6%
2020	1,534		−2.5%
Source: US Decennial Census

== Geography ==
According to the 2010 census, the township has a total area of 42.27 square miles (109.5 km^{2}), of which 40.88 square miles (105.9 km^{2}) (or 96.71%) is land and 1.39 square miles (3.6 km^{2}) (or 3.29%) is water.

=== Cities, towns, villages ===
- Morocco

=== Cemeteries ===
The township contains four cemeteries: Beaver City, Murphy, Bell, and Oakland.

=== Major highways ===
- U.S. Route 41
- State Road 114

=== Lakes ===
- Cory Lake
- J C Murphy Lake

== School districts ==
- North Newton School Corporation
