= North Newton School Corporation =

School district in Indiana

North Newton School Corporation is a school district in Newton County, Indiana. The district headquarters are in Morocco, on the property of Morocco Elementary School.

The North Newton Junior-Senior High School is located in McClellan Township, Newton County, Indiana. The school system covers a large area of about 260 square miles (670 km^{2}). Presently there are about 1400 students in this mainly rural school corporation.

It serves students in the towns of Lake Village, Mount Ayr, Morocco, Roselawn (Newton County portion), Sumava Resorts, Thayer.

== School Board Members ==
- Superintendent— Dr. Cathy Rowe
- Director of Business Services—Ms. Karen Zackfia
- Superintendent's Secretary—Mrs. Debbie Miller
- Deputy Treasurer—Mrs. Mary Sheldon

== Lake Village Elementary School ==
- K-6 in the north
- Approx. 210 students
- Located in Lake Village, Indiana
- 14 students per teacher
- Mascot- Tiger

Lake Village Elementary School (K-6) is located in the town of Lake Village. Money received through fundraisers is used to enrich student programs. Lake Village School has a curriculum that includes instruction for children with special needs, a gifted program, and counseling services.

- Highest rated Elementary School in District

== Lincoln Elementary School ==
- K–6 school in the north
- Approx. 340 students
- Located in Roselawn, Indiana
- 30 students per teacher
- School Colors - Green and White
- School Nickname - Lincoln Eagles

== Morocco Elementary School ==
- K–6 in the south
- Approx. 210 students
- Located in Morocco, Indiana
- students vary per teacher
- Activities/Clubs- Student Council, Gifted and Talented, student-led Corporation and store, Varsity Choir, tutoring club, Exchange City, Junior Achievement, 4H, Girl Scouts and Boy Scouts, student mentoring program, spelling bee competition, Robotics Club, DARE Program, SRC, computer lab
- Sports- 5th and 6th grade boys and girls basketball is offered. Volleyball is also offered to girls in grades 5 and 6.

== North Newton Junior-Senior High School ==
- Grades 7–12
- Approx. 776 students
- Meets the state average of 17 students per teacher
- Located in a rural area of Newton County (Enos Indiana) which is located 5 miles (8.0 km) south of Lake Village, Indiana on U.S. 41., with a mailing address of Morocco, Indiana
- North Newton has a graduating rate above the Indiana average at 83.8% of its seniors graduating in 2005.
- Principal - Katherine Heintz
- Assistant Principal - Tony Brooks
- Athletics/Activities Director - Sam Zachery
- Director of Guidance - Alexis Fitsimmons
- Each period lasts for 45 Minutes
- School Colors - Blue, White, and Orange
- School Song:

Note: "Newton's" song is a strict knock-off of the University of Michigan's famous fight song.

Hail To The Victors!
HAIL TO THE VICTORS VALIANT
HAIL TO THE CONQUERING HEROES
HAIL, HAIL TO NORTH NEWTON
THE LEADERS AND BEST.
HAIL TO THE VICTORS VALIANT
HAIL TO THE CONQUERING HEROES
HAIL, HAIL TO NORTH NEWTON
THE CHAMPIONS OF THE NORTH

- School Nickname - Spartans
- School Yearbook- The Olympian, as of 2006, there has been 39 volumes
- Two gyms (1 High School, 1 Jr. High), swimming pool, football field, baseball field, cross country course
- Offers honors and college prep courses
- Offers Advanced Placement Exams in the following courses: English 11, Calculus, and Environmental Science
- Clubs- National Honor Society, Student Council, FFA, FCCLA, Spanish Club, Math Club, French Club, Science Olympiad, BPA, Spell Bowl
- Bands- Has a Jr. and Sr. concert band and a pep band
- Choir- Offers Jr. and Sr. choir, and Spartans in the Spotlight which is a show choir

The district's bus barn is in the southwest portion of the school property.
