= J.C. Murphy Lake =

J.C. Murphey Lake
- Location within Indiana Location within the United States
- Location: Newton County, Indiana
- Coordinates: 40°58′46″N 87°30′11″W
- Type: reservoir
- Basin countries: United States
- Surface elevation: 659 ft (201 m)

J. C. Murphey Lake is a reservoir in Newton County, Indiana, United States. It is part of the Willow Slough Fish and Wildlife Area.
