= Lincoln Township, Newton County, Indiana =

Lincoln Township
- Township
- Coordinates: 41°08′06″N 87°19′27″W
- Country: United States
- State: Indiana
- County: Newton

Government
  - Type: Indiana township

Area
  - Total: 42.56 sq mi (110.2 km^{2})
  - Land: 42.39 sq mi (109.8 km^{2})
  - Water: 0.16 sq mi (0.41 km^{2})
- Elevation: 679 ft (207 m)

Population (2020)
  - Total: 4,563
  - Density: 107.6/sq mi (41.56/km^{2})
- Time zone: UTC-6 (Central (CST))
  - Summer (DST): UTC-5 (CDT)
- Area code: 219
- FIPS code: 18-43830
- GNIS feature ID: 453572

Lincoln Township is one of ten townships in Newton County, Indiana. As of the 2020 census, its population was 4,563 and it contained 1,829 housing units.

Historical population
Census	Pop.	Note	%±
1890	518		—
1900	760		46.7%
1910	701		−7.8%
1920	658		−6.1%
1930	690		4.9%
1940	795		15.2%
1950	929		16.9%
1960	987		6.2%
1970	1,191		20.7%
1980	3,753		215.1%
1990	3,591		−4.3%
2000	4,268		18.9%
2010	4,480		5.0%
2020	4,563		1.9%
Source: US Decennial Census

== History ==
Lincoln Township was established in 1872.

== Geography ==
According to the 2010 census, the township has a total area of 42.56 square miles (110.2 km^{2}), of which 42.39 square miles (109.8 km^{2}) (or 99.60%) is land and 0.16 square miles (0.41 km^{2}) (or 0.38%) is water.

=== Unincorporated towns ===
- Roselawn at 41.1417024°N 87.3147528°W
- Thayer at 41.1733690°N 87.3336426°W

(This list is based on USGS data and may include former settlements.)
