= Newton County, Indiana =

County in Indiana, United States

- County
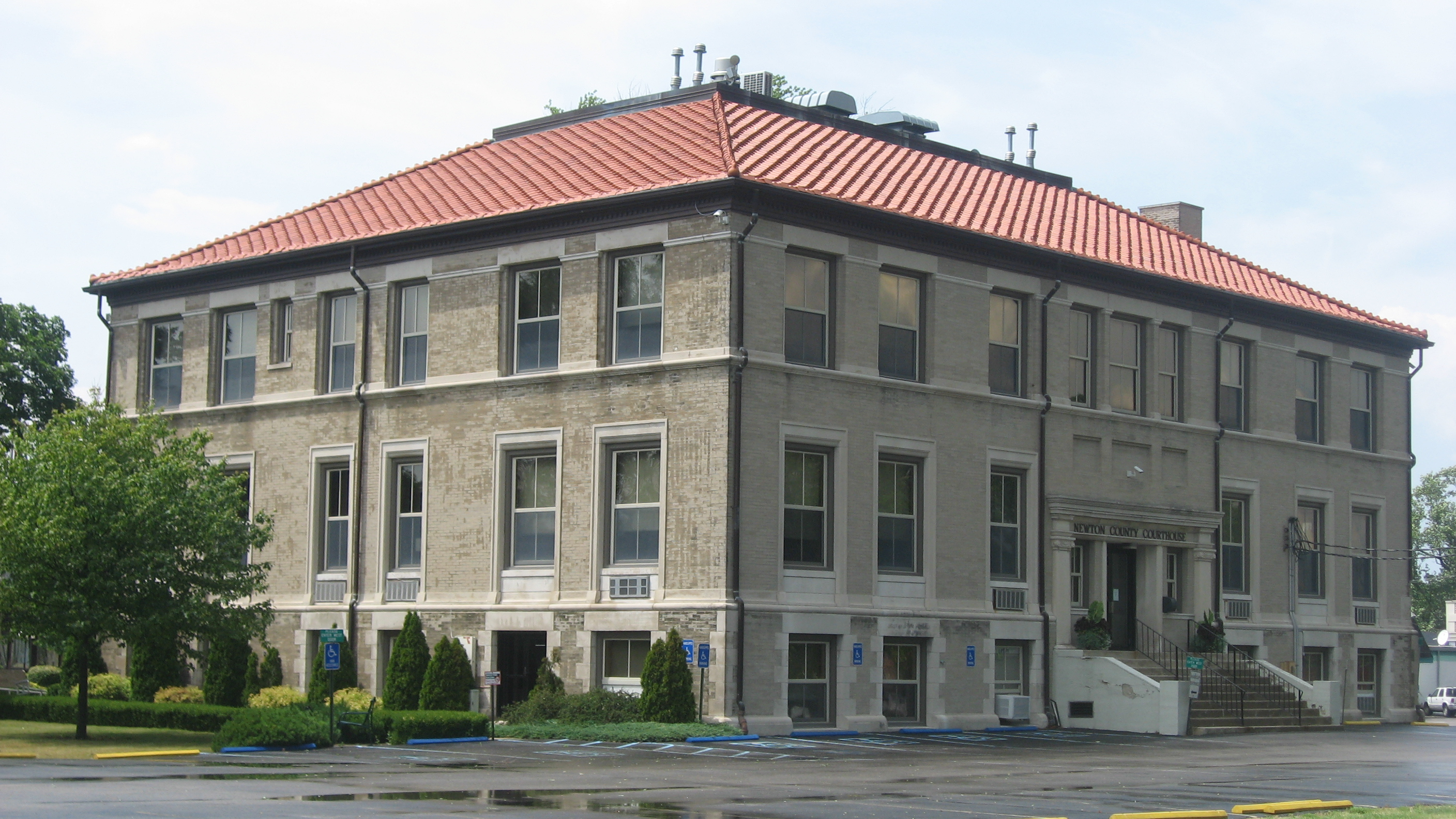
- Newton County Courthouse in Kentland

- Location in the state of Indiana

- Indiana's location in the U.S.
- Coordinates: 40°57′N 87°24′W
- Country: United States
- State: Indiana
- Organized: February 7, 1835
- Abolished: 1839
- Re-organized: December 8, 1859
- Named for: Sgt. John Newton
- County seat: Kentland
- Largest town: Kentland (population and total area)
- Incorporated Municipalities: Five Towns: Brook; Goodland; Kentland; Morocco; Mount Ayr

Government
  - Type: County
  - Body: Board of Commissioners
  - Commissioner: Steven Eilers (1st)
  - Commissioner: Abbey Rossiter (2nd)
  - Commissioner: Robert Churchill (3rd)

Area
  - County: 403.44 sq mi (1,044.9 km^{2})
  - Land: 401.76 sq mi (1,040.6 km^{2})
  - Water: 1.68 sq mi (4.4 km^{2})
  - Metro: 10,874 sq mi (28,160 km^{2})
  - Rank: 43rd largest county in Indiana
  - Region: 2,726 sq mi (7,060 km^{2})
- Elevation: 692 ft (211 m)

Population (2020)
  - County: 13,830
  - Estimate (2025): 14,188 ▲
  - Rank: 82nd largest county in Indiana
  - Density: 34.42/sq mi (13.29/km^{2})
  - Region: 819,537
- Time zone: UTC−6 (Central)
  - Summer (DST): UTC−5 (Central)
- ZIP Codes: 46310, 46349, 46381, 47922, 47942-43, 47948, 47951, 47963, 47978
- Area code: 219
- Congressional district: 4th
- Indiana Senate district: 6th
- Indiana House of Representatives districts: 15th and 19th
- FIPS code: 18-111
- GNIS feature ID: 0450376
- Interstate and U.S. Routes: link = U.S. Route 52 in Indiana
- State Routes: link = Indiana State Road 10 link = Indiana State Road 14 link = Indiana State Road 16 link = Indiana State Road 55 link = Indiana State Road 71 link = Indiana State Road 114
- Airport: Kentland Municipal
- Waterways: Iroquois River – Kankakee River
- Website: www.newtoncounty.in.gov
- Indiana county number 56; Second county in Indiana to bear this name; Youngest county in Indiana

Demographics (2010)
Demographic	Proportion
White	96.2%
Black	0.4%
Asian	0.3%
Islander	0.0%
Native	0.3%
Other	2.8%
Hispanic (any race)	5.0%

Newton County is a county located near the northwestern corner of the U.S. state of Indiana. As of 2020, the population was 13,830. This county is part of Northwest Indiana as well as the Chicago metropolitan area. The county seat is Kentland. The county is divided into 10 townships which provide local services.

== History ==
The original Newton County was formed by statute on February 7, 1835, and was a roughly square area some 30 miles on a side, encompassing what is now the northern half of the county, the northern half of Jasper County, and a large section to the north. The northern border was cut back to the Kankakee River on February 1, 1836, with all land north of the Kankakee River going to Lake and Porter counties. The county was abolished and combined with Jasper County in 1839. On December 8, 1859, the county was re-created and the borders were redrawn to essentially their current state.

Newton County is named after Sgt. John Newton, who served under Gen. Francis Marion (the "Swamp Fox") in the American Revolutionary War. It is adjacent to Jasper County, which was named after Sgt. William Jasper, whose story is similar. At least four other states, Georgia, Mississippi, Missouri and Texas, have adjacent Jasper and Newton Counties, as though these two were remembered as a pair.

Upon its re-creation, Newton County was the last of Indiana's 92 counties to be organized.

== Geography ==
According to the 2010 census, the county has a total area of 403.44 square miles (1,044.9 km^{2}), of which 401.76 square miles (1,040.6 km^{2}) (or 99.58%) is land and 1.68 square miles (4.4 km^{2}) (or 0.42%) is water.

Beaver Lake, once Indiana's largest lake before being drained, existed in what is now Newton County.

J.C. Murphy Lake is at the center of Willow Slough Fish and Wildlife Area.

Newton County is the site of the Kentland crater, a probable meteorite impact crater located between Kentland and Goodland.

=== Major highways ===
- Interstate 65
- U.S. Route 24
- U.S. Route 41
- U.S. Route 52
- State Road 10
- State Road 14
- State Road 16
- State Road 55
- State Road 71
- State Road 114

=== Railroads ===
- CSX Transportation
- Toledo, Peoria and Western Railway

=== Adjacent counties ===
- Lake County (north)
- Jasper County (east)
- Benton County (south)
- Iroquois County, Illinois (west)
- Kankakee County, Illinois (northwest)

== Municipalities ==
The municipalities in Newton County, and their populations as of the 2010 Census, are:

=== Towns ===
- Brook – 997
- Goodland – 1,043
- Kentland – 1,748
- Morocco – 1,129
- Mount Ayr – 122

=== Census-designated places ===
- Lake Village – 765
- Roselawn – 4,131

=== Other unincorporated places ===
- Ade
- Beaver City
- Effner
- Enos
- Foresman
- Sumava Resorts
- Thayer

== Townships ==
The 10 townships of Newton County, with their housing units as of the 2010 Census, are:

- Beaver
- Colfax
- Grant
- Iroquois
- Jackson
- Jefferson
- Lake
- Lincoln
- McClellan
- Washington

== Climate and weather ==
Kentland, Indiana

Climate chart (precipitation, max. and min. temperature)
J	F	M	A	M	J	J	A	S	O	N	D
1.8 31 14	1.6 36 18	2.8 48 29	3.4 61 38	4.1 73 50	4.5 82 60	4 85 63	3.7 83 60	3.3 78 53	2.8 65 41	3.2 49 31	2.4 36 20
- █ Average max. and min. temperatures in °F
- █ Precipitation totals in inches
- Source: The Weather Channel
Metric conversion
J	F	M	A	M	J	J	A	S	O	N	D
45 −1 −10	41 2 −8	70 9 −2	86 16 3	103 23 10	115 28 16	102 29 17	93 28 16	83 26 12	72 18 5	81 9 −1	62 2 −7
- █ Average max. and min. temperatures in °C
- █ Precipitation totals in mm

In recent years, average temperatures in Kentland have ranged from a low of 14 °F (−10 °C) in January to a high of 85 °F (29 °C) in July, with a record low of −25 °F (−32 °C) recorded in January 1985 and a record high of 104 °F (40 °C) recorded in June 1988. Average monthly precipitation ranged from 1.60 inches (41 mm) in February to 4.51 inches (115 mm) in June.

== Government ==
The county government is a constitutional body granted specific powers by the Constitution of Indiana and the Indiana Code. The county council is the legislative branch of the county government and controls all spending and revenue collection. Representatives are elected from county districts. The council members serve four-year terms and are responsible for setting salaries, the annual budget and special spending. The council also has limited authority to impose local taxes, in the form of an income and property tax that is subject to state level approval, excise taxes and service taxes.

The executive body of the county is made of a board of commissioners. The commissioners are elected countywide, in staggered terms, and each serves a four-year term. One of the commissioners, typically the most senior, serves as president. The commissioners are charged with executing the acts legislated by the council, collecting revenue and managing day-to-day functions of the county government.

The county maintains a small claims court that can handle some civil cases. The judge on the court is elected to a term of four years and must be a member of the Indiana Bar Association. The judge is assisted by a constable who is elected to a four-year term. In some cases, court decisions can be appealed to the state level circuit court.

The county has several other elected offices, including sheriff, coroner, auditor, treasurer, recorder, surveyor and circuit court clerk. Each of these elected officers serves a term of four years and oversees a different part of county government. Members elected to county government positions are required to declare party affiliations and be residents of the county.

Each of the townships has a trustee who administers rural fire protection and ambulance service, provides poor relief and manages cemetery care, among other duties. The trustee is assisted in these duties by a three-member township board. The trustees and board members are elected to four-year terms.

Newton County is part of Indiana's 4th congressional district. It is part of Indiana Senate district 6 and Indiana House of Representatives districts 15 and 19.

United States presidential election results for Newton County, Indiana
Year	Republican		Democratic		Third party(ies)	
Year	No.	%	No.	%	No.	%
1888	1,283	57.66%	860	38.65%	82	3.69%
1892	1,191	52.49%	879	38.74%	199	8.77%
1896	1,545	55.64%	1,204	43.36%	28	1.01%
1900	1,715	57.45%	1,165	39.03%	105	3.52%
1904	1,803	62.22%	951	32.82%	144	4.97%
1908	1,645	56.47%	1,190	40.85%	78	2.68%
1912	892	34.12%	965	36.92%	757	28.96%
1916	1,377	47.58%	1,278	44.16%	239	8.26%
1920	3,129	64.37%	1,664	34.23%	68	1.40%
1924	2,705	60.37%	1,523	33.99%	253	5.65%
1928	3,053	64.48%	1,649	34.83%	33	0.70%
1932	2,380	46.65%	2,654	52.02%	68	1.33%
1936	2,937	54.31%	2,430	44.93%	41	0.76%
1940	3,536	62.32%	2,116	37.29%	22	0.39%
1944	3,398	67.91%	1,583	31.63%	23	0.46%
1948	3,312	68.36%	1,483	30.61%	50	1.03%
1952	4,159	74.79%	1,373	24.69%	29	0.52%
1956	3,890	74.49%	1,316	25.20%	16	0.31%
1960	3,517	65.12%	1,870	34.62%	14	0.26%
1964	2,780	52.06%	2,547	47.70%	13	0.24%
1968	3,145	61.75%	1,453	28.53%	495	9.72%
1972	3,771	75.00%	1,252	24.90%	5	0.10%
1976	3,204	58.44%	2,236	40.78%	43	0.78%
1980	3,850	66.81%	1,649	28.61%	264	4.58%
1984	3,560	68.54%	1,596	30.73%	38	0.73%
1988	3,274	65.02%	1,744	34.64%	17	0.34%
1992	2,295	42.95%	1,757	32.88%	1,292	24.18%
1996	2,075	43.14%	1,897	39.44%	838	17.42%
2000	3,250	58.98%	2,101	38.13%	159	2.89%
2004	3,757	64.24%	2,032	34.75%	59	1.01%
2008	3,301	54.53%	2,625	43.36%	128	2.11%
2012	3,291	58.02%	2,212	39.00%	169	2.98%
2016	4,077	69.57%	1,404	23.96%	379	6.47%
2020	4,942	74.78%	1,509	22.83%	158	2.39%
2024	5,131	77.73%	1,370	20.75%	100	1.51%

== Demographics ==
Historical population
Census	Pop.	Note	%±
1860	2,360		—
1870	5,829		147.0%
1880	8,167		40.1%
1890	8,803		7.8%
1900	10,448		18.7%
1910	10,504		0.5%
1920	10,144		−3.4%
1930	9,841		−3.0%
1940	10,775		9.5%
1950	11,006		2.1%
1960	11,502		4.5%
1970	11,606		0.9%
1980	14,844		27.9%
1990	13,551		−8.7%
2000	14,566		7.5%
2010	14,244		−2.2%
2020	13,830		−2.9%
2025 (est.)	14,188	▲	2.6%
U.S. Decennial Census; 1790-1960 1900-1990; 1990-2000 2010

=== Racial and ethnic composition ===
Newton County, Indiana – Racial and ethnic composition Note: the US Census treats Hispanic/Latino as an ethnic category. This table excludes Latinos from the racial categories and assigns them to a separate category. Hispanics/Latinos may be of any race.
Race / Ethnicity (NH = Non-Hispanic)	Pop 1980	Pop 1990	Pop 2000	Pop 2010	Pop 2020	% 1980	% 1990	% 2000	% 2010	% 2020
White alone (NH)	14,661	13,305	13,947	13,296	12,053	98.77%	98.18%	95.75%	93.34%	87.15%
Black or African American alone (NH)	11	9	24	53	42	0.07%	0.07%	0.16%	0.37%	0.30%
Native American or Alaska Native alone (NH)	18	38	43	33	25	0.12%	0.28%	0.30%	0.23%	0.18%
Asian alone (NH)	38	22	32	38	34	0.26%	0.16%	0.22%	0.27%	0.25%
Native Hawaiian or Pacific Islander alone (NH)	x	x	3	2	2	x	x	0.02%	0.01%	0.01%
Other race alone (NH)	3	0	3	8	34	0.02%	0.00%	0.02%	0.06%	0.25%
Mixed race or Multiracial (NH)	x	x	92	97	601	x	x	0.63%	0.68%	4.35%
Hispanic or Latino (any race)	113	177	422	717	1,039	0.76%	1.31%	2.90%	5.03%	7.51%
Total	14,844	13,551	14,566	14,244	13,830	100.00%	100.00%	100.00%	100.00%	100.00%

=== 2020 census ===
As of the 2020 census, the county had a population of 13,830. The median age was 44.7 years. 21.4% of residents were under the age of 18 and 20.2% of residents were 65 years of age or older. For every 100 females there were 102.4 males, and for every 100 females age 18 and over there were 102.1 males age 18 and over.

The racial makeup of the county was 89.1% White, 0.3% Black or African American, 0.2% American Indian and Alaska Native, 0.3% Asian, <0.1% Native Hawaiian and Pacific Islander, 3.7% from some other race, and 6.4% from two or more races. Hispanic or Latino residents of any race comprised 7.5% of the population.

<0.1% of residents lived in urban areas, while 100.0% lived in rural areas.

There were 5,537 households in the county, of which 28.9% had children under the age of 18 living in them. Of all households, 51.3% were married-couple households, 19.6% were households with a male householder and no spouse or partner present, and 20.8% were households with a female householder and no spouse or partner present. About 26.3% of all households were made up of individuals and 12.4% had someone living alone who was 65 years of age or older.

There were 6,018 housing units, of which 8.0% were vacant. Among occupied housing units, 81.9% were owner-occupied and 18.1% were renter-occupied. The homeowner vacancy rate was 1.8% and the rental vacancy rate was 7.7%.

=== 2010 census ===
As of the 2010 United States census, there were 14,244 people, 5,503 households, and 3,945 families residing in the county. The population density was 35.5 inhabitants per square mile (13.7/km^{2}). There were 6,030 housing units at an average density of 15.0 per square mile (5.8/km^{2}). The racial makeup of the county was 96.2% white, 0.4% black or African American, 0.3% Asian, 0.3% American Indian, 1.8% from other races, and 1.1% from two or more races. Those of Hispanic or Latino origin made up 5.0% of the population. In terms of ancestry, 30.4% were German, 16.9% were Irish, 11.0% were English, 8.1% were Polish, 7.6% were Dutch, and 6.5% were American.

Of the 5,503 households, 31.1% had children under the age of 18 living with them, 57.3% were married couples living together, 8.7% had a female householder with no husband present, 28.3% were non-families, and 23.8% of all households were made up of individuals. The average household size was 2.56 and the average family size was 3.00. The median age was 42.4 years.

The median income for a household in the county was $47,697 and the median income for a family was $60,242. Males had a median income of $45,389 versus $29,891 for females. The per capita income for the county was $24,055. About 4.8% of families and 8.2% of the population were below the poverty line, including 12.0% of those under age 18 and 5.3% of those age 65 or over.

== Education ==
Public schools in Newton County are administered by two districts:

- North Newton School Corporation
- South Newton School Corporation

High Schools and Middle Schools

- North Newton Junior-Senior High School
- South Newton High School
- South Newton Middle School

Elementary Schools

- Lake Village Elementary School
- Lincoln Elementary School
- Morocco Elementary School
- South Newton Elementary School

== See also ==
- National Register of Historic Places listings in Newton County, Indiana
