= Mount Ayr, Indiana =

- Town
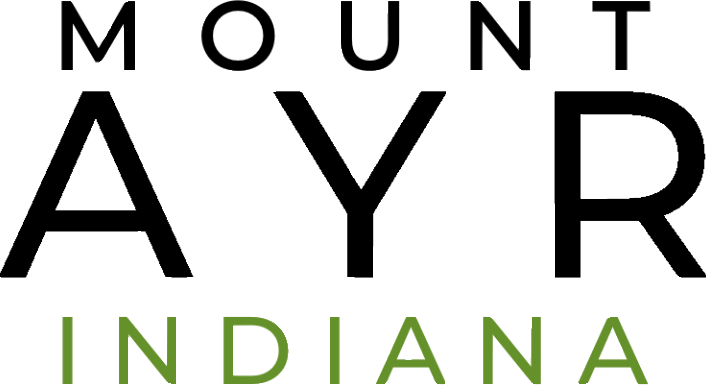
- Seal Logo

- Location of Mount Ayr in Newton County, Indiana
- Coordinates: 40°57′08″N 87°17′56″W
- Country: United States
- State: Indiana
- County: Newton
- Township: Jackson

Area
  - Total: 0.17 sq mi (0.45 km^{2})
  - Land: 0.17 sq mi (0.45 km^{2})
  - Water: 0 sq mi (0.00 km^{2})
- Elevation: 709 ft (216 m)

Population (2020)
  - Total: 117
  - Density: 668.5/sq mi (258.09/km^{2})
- Time zone: UTC-6 (Central (CST))
  - Summer (DST): UTC-5 (CDT)
- ZIP code: 47964
- Area code: 219
- FIPS code: 18-51336
- GNIS feature ID: 2396787
- Website: townofmtayr.in.gov

Mount Ayr is a town in Jackson Township, Newton County, in the U.S. state of Indiana. As of the 2020 census, Mount Ayr had a population of 117.

== History ==
Mount Ayr was laid out as a town in 1882 when the railroad was extended to that point. The town was named after Mount Airy, North Carolina, the native home of its founder. A post office has been in operation at Mount Ayr since 1886.

== Geography ==
According to the 2010 census, Mount Ayr has a total area of 0.15 square miles (0.39 km^{2}), all land.

== Demographics ==
Historical population
Census	Pop.	Note	%±
1910	231		—
1920	199		−13.9%
1930	216		8.5%
1940	207		−4.2%
1950	222		7.2%
1960	186		−16.2%
1970	194		4.3%
1980	207		6.7%
1990	151		−27.1%
2000	147		−2.6%
2010	122		−17.0%
2020	117		−4.1%
U.S. Decennial Census

=== 2010 census ===
As of the census of 2010, there were 122 people, 51 households, and 31 families residing in the town. The population density was 813.3 inhabitants per square mile (314.0/km^{2}). There were 57 housing units at an average density of 380.0 per square mile (146.7/km^{2}). The racial makeup of the town was 97.5% White and 2.5% from two or more races. Hispanic or Latino people of any race were 5.7% of the population.

There were 51 households, of which 19.6% had children under the age of 18 living with them, 45.1% were married couples living together, 9.8% had a female householder with no husband present, 5.9% had a male householder with no wife present, and 39.2% were non-families. 27.5% of all households were made up of individuals, and 9.8% had someone living alone who was 65 years of age or older. The average household size was 2.39 and the average family size was 2.71.

The median age in the town was 47.5 years. 17.2% of residents were under the age of 18; 11.5% were between the ages of 18 and 24; 18.9% were from 25 to 44; 32.1% were from 45 to 64; and 20.5% were 65 years of age or older. The gender makeup of the town was 53.3% male and 46.7% female.

=== 2000 census ===
As of the census of 2000, there were 147 people, 52 households, and 40 families residing in the town. The population density was 983.8 inhabitants per square mile (379.8/km^{2}). There were 59 housing units at an average density of 394.9 per square mile (152.5/km^{2}). The racial makeup of the town was 99.32% White, and 0.68% from two or more races.

There were 52 households, out of which 28.8% had children under the age of 18 living with them, 65.4% were married couples living together, 7.7% had a female householder with no husband present, and 21.2% were non-families. 17.3% of all households were made up of individuals, and 9.6% had someone living alone who was 65 years of age or older. The average household size was 2.83 and the average family size was 3.17.

In the town, the population was spread out, with 28.6% under the age of 18, 8.2% from 18 to 24, 25.9% from 25 to 44, 25.2% from 45 to 64, and 12.2% who were 65 years of age or older. The median age was 37 years. For every 100 females, there were 86.1 males. For every 100 females age 18 and over, there were 87.5 males.

The median income for a household in the town was $52,000, and the median income for a family was $53,750. Males had a median income of $33,036 versus $21,250 for females. The per capita income for the town was $18,195. None of the population and none of the families were below the poverty line.

== Education ==
Mount Ayr is in the North Newton School Corporation.
