= Jefferson Township, Newton County, Indiana =

Jefferson Township
- Township
- Coordinates: 40°46′47″N 87°26′56″W
- Country: United States
- State: Indiana
- County: Newton

Government
  - Type: Indiana township

Area
  - Total: 45.14 sq mi (116.9 km^{2})
  - Land: 45.14 sq mi (116.9 km^{2})
  - Water: 0 sq mi (0 km^{2})
- Elevation: 669 ft (204 m)

Population (2020)
  - Total: 1,987
  - Density: 44.02/sq mi (17.00/km^{2})
- Time zone: UTC-6 (Central (CST))
  - Summer (DST): UTC-5 (CDT)
- Area code: 219
- FIPS code: 18-38106
- GNIS feature ID: 453492

Jefferson Township is one of ten townships in Newton County, Indiana. As of the 2020 census, its population was 1,987 and it contained 947 housing units.

Historical population
Census	Pop.	Note	%±
1890	1,875		—
1900	1,816		−3.1%
1910	1,954		7.6%
1920	1,941		−0.7%
1930	1,972		1.6%
1940	2,113		7.2%
1950	2,134		1.0%
1960	2,268		6.3%
1970	2,294		1.1%
1980	2,384		3.9%
1990	2,224		−6.7%
2000	2,248		1.1%
2010	2,140		−4.8%
2020	1,987		−7.1%
Source: US Decennial Census

== History ==
Jefferson Township was established in 1860.

== Geography ==
According to the 2010 census, the township has a total area of 45.14 square miles (116.9 km^{2}), all land.

=== Cities and towns ===
- Kentland

=== Unincorporated towns ===
- Effner at 40.7705923°N 87.5253052°W

(This list is based on USGS data and may include former settlements.)

== Education ==
Jefferson Township is served by the Kentland-Jefferson Township Public Library.
