= Sheldon, Illinois =

- Village
- Location in Iroquois County, Illinois

- Location in Iroquois County
- Coordinates: 40°46′16″N 87°33′57″W
- Country: United States
- State: Illinois
- County: Iroquois
- Township: Sheldon

Area
  - Total: 0.75 sq mi (1.95 km^{2})
  - Land: 0.75 sq mi (1.95 km^{2})
  - Water: 0 sq mi (0.00 km^{2})
- Elevation: 689 ft (210 m)

Population (2020)
  - Total: 965
  - Density: 1,281.8/sq mi (494.89/km^{2})
- Time zone: UTC-6 (CST)
  - Summer (DST): UTC-5 (CDT)
- ZIP code: 60966
- Area code: 815
- FIPS code: 17-69212
- GNIS feature ID: 2399797
- Website: https://villageofsheldonil.org/

Sheldon is a village in Sheldon Township, Iroquois County, Illinois, United States. The population was 965 at the 2020 census.

== Geography ==
Sheldon is located in eastern Iroquois County. U.S. Route 24 runs along the northern edge of the village, leading west 9 miles (14 km) to Watseka, the Iroquois county seat, and east 6 miles (10 km) to Kentland, Indiana. U.S. Route 52 intersects US 24 along Sheldon's northern border, leading north 3.5 miles (5.6 km) to Iroquois and east with US 24 into Indiana.

According to the 2021 census gazetteer files, Sheldon has a total area of 0.75 square miles (1.94 km^{2}), all land.

== Demographics ==
Historical population
Census	Pop.	Note	%±
1870	231		—
1880	947		310.0%
1890	910		−3.9%
1900	1,103		21.2%
1910	1,143		3.6%
1920	1,182		3.4%
1930	1,121		−5.2%
1940	1,036		−7.6%
1950	1,114		7.5%
1960	1,137		2.1%
1970	1,455		28.0%
1980	1,215		−16.5%
1990	1,109		−8.7%
2000	1,232		11.1%
2010	1,070		−13.1%
2020	965		−9.8%
U.S. Decennial Census

As of the 2020 census there were 965 people, 605 households, and 330 families residing in the village. The population density was 1,281.54 inhabitants per square mile (494.81/km^{2}). There were 461 housing units at an average density of 612.22 per square mile (236.38/km^{2}). The racial makeup of the village was 89.95% White, 0.83% African American, 0.73% Native American, 0.21% Asian, 0.00% Pacific Islander, 0.93% from other races, and 7.36% from two or more races. Hispanic or Latino of any race were 4.87% of the population.

There were 605 households, out of which 21.3% had children under the age of 18 living with them, 34.38% were married couples living together, 16.53% had a female householder with no husband present, and 45.45% were non-families. 40.83% of all households were made up of individuals, and 13.55% had someone living alone who was 65 years of age or older. The average household size was 2.53 and the average family size was 1.94.

The village's age distribution consisted of 16.4% under the age of 18, 8.3% from 18 to 24, 20.6% from 25 to 44, 37.1% from 45 to 64, and 17.9% who were 65 years of age or older. The median age was 46.5 years. For every 100 females, there were 95.8 males. For every 100 females age 18 and over, there were 90.1 males.

The median income for a household in the village was $36,506, and the median income for a family was $61,000. Males had a median income of $36,944 versus $27,083 for females. The per capita income for the village was $24,223. About 12.4% of families and 16.7% of the population were below the poverty line, including 26.0% of those under age 18 and 20.9% of those age 65 or over.
