= Colfax Township, Newton County, Indiana =

Colfax Township
- Township
- Location in Newton County
- Coordinates: 41°02′09″N 87°20′35″W
- Country: United States
- State: Indiana
- County: Newton

Government
  - Type: Indiana township

Area
  - Total: 36.53 sq mi (94.6 km^{2})
  - Land: 36.53 sq mi (94.6 km^{2})
  - Water: 0 sq mi (0 km^{2}) 0%
- Elevation: 676 ft (206 m)

Population (2020)
  - Total: 155
  - Density: 4.24/sq mi (1.64/km^{2})
- Time zone: UTC-6 (Central (CST))
  - Summer (DST): UTC-5 (CDT)
- ZIP codes: 46349, 47943, 47963
- Area code: 219
- GNIS feature ID: 453237

Colfax Township is one of ten townships in Newton County, Indiana, United States. As of the 2020 census, its population was 155 and it contained 70 housing units.

Historical population
Census	Pop.	Note	%±
1890	128		—
1900	271		111.7%
1910	297		9.6%
1920	306		3.0%
1930	262		−14.4%
1940	292		11.5%
1950	281		−3.8%
1960	299		6.4%
1970	256		−14.4%
1980	213		−16.8%
1990	197		−7.5%
2000	176		−10.7%
2010	199		13.1%
2020	155		−22.1%
Source: US Decennial Census

== History ==
Colfax Township was established in 1871. It was named for Vice President Schuyler Colfax.

== Geography ==
According to the 2010 census, the township has a total area of 36.53 square miles (94.6 km^{2}), all land.

== School districts ==
- North Newton School Corporation

== Political districts ==
- Indiana's 1st congressional district
- State House District 15
- State Senate District 6
