= Washington Township, Newton County, Indiana =

Washington Township
- Township
- Coordinates: 40°52′15″N 87°27′12″W
- Country: United States
- State: Indiana
- County: Newton

Government
  - Type: Indiana township

Area
  - Total: 45.88 sq mi (118.8 km^{2})
  - Land: 45.88 sq mi (118.8 km^{2})
  - Water: 0 sq mi (0 km^{2})
- Elevation: 676 ft (206 m)

Population (2020)
  - Total: 304
  - Density: 6.63/sq mi (2.56/km^{2})
- Time zone: UTC-6 (Central (CST))
  - Summer (DST): UTC-5 (CDT)
- Area code: 219
- FIPS code: 18-80864
- GNIS feature ID: 454009

Washington Township is one of ten townships in Newton County, Indiana. As of the 2020 census, its population was 304 and it contained 139 housing units.

Historical population
Census	Pop.	Note	%±
1890	1,016		—
1900	994		−2.2%
1910	888		−10.7%
1920	685		−22.9%
1930	827		20.7%
1940	817		−1.2%
1950	682		−16.5%
1960	631		−7.5%
1970	502		−20.4%
1980	536		6.8%
1990	385		−28.2%
2000	354		−8.1%
2010	322		−9.0%
2020	304		−5.6%
Source: US Decennial Census

== Geography ==
According to the 2010 census, the township has a total area of 45.88 square miles (118.8 km^{2}), all land.

=== Unincorporated towns ===
- Ade at 40.8683693°N 87.4447497°W
- Beaver City at 40.9069801°N 87.4155833°W

(This list is based on USGS data and may include former settlements.)

== Education ==
Washington Township residents may obtain a free library card from the Brook-Iroquois Township Public Library in Brook.
