= Ade, Indiana =

- Unincorporated community
- Location within Indiana Location within the United States
- Coordinates: 40°52′06″N 87°26′41″W
- Country: United States
- State: Indiana
- County: Newton
- Township: Washington
- Elevation: 656 ft (200 m)
- Time zone: UTC-6 (Central (CST))
  - Summer (DST): UTC-5 (CDT)
- ZIP code: 47922
- Area code: 219
- FIPS code: 18-00604
- GNIS feature ID: 430017

Ade is an unincorporated community in Washington Township, Newton County, in the U.S. state of Indiana.

== History ==
Ade was laid out as a town in 1906. It was named for John Ade, the first recorder of Newton County and the father of George Ade, an American author and playwright. A post office was established at Ade in 1904, and remained in operation until it was discontinued in 1912.

In 1920, the population was 52. The population was 25 in 1940.

== See also ==
- Foresman, Indiana
