= Jackson Township, Newton County, Indiana =

Jackson Township
- Township
- Coordinates: 40°57′12″N 87°20′36″W
- Country: United States
- State: Indiana
- County: Newton

Government
  - Type: Indiana township

Area
  - Total: 36.65 sq mi (94.9 km^{2})
  - Land: 36.62 sq mi (94.8 km^{2})
  - Water: 0.03 sq mi (0.078 km^{2})
- Elevation: 712 ft (217 m)

Population (2020)
  - Total: 365
  - Density: 9.97/sq mi (3.85/km^{2})
- Time zone: UTC-6 (Central (CST))
  - Summer (DST): UTC-5 (CDT)
- Area code: 219
- FIPS code: 18-37242
- GNIS feature ID: 453457

Jackson Township is one of ten townships in Newton County, Indiana. As of the 2020 census, its population was 365 and it contained 179 housing units.

Historical population
Census	Pop.	Note	%±
1890	947		—
1900	913		−3.6%
1910	834		−8.7%
1920	785		−5.9%
1930	758		−3.4%
1940	746		−1.6%
1950	770		3.2%
1960	621		−19.4%
1970	567		−8.7%
1980	578		1.9%
1990	480		−17.0%
2000	439		−8.5%
2010	382		−13.0%
2020	365		−4.5%
Source: US Decennial Census

== Geography ==
According to the 2010 census, the township has a total area of 36.65 square miles (94.9 km^{2}), of which 36.62 square miles (94.8 km^{2}) (or 99.92%) is land and 0.03 square miles (0.078 km^{2}) (or 0.08%) is water.

=== Cities and towns ===
- Mount Ayr
