= Goodland, Indiana =

- Town
- Town of Goodland
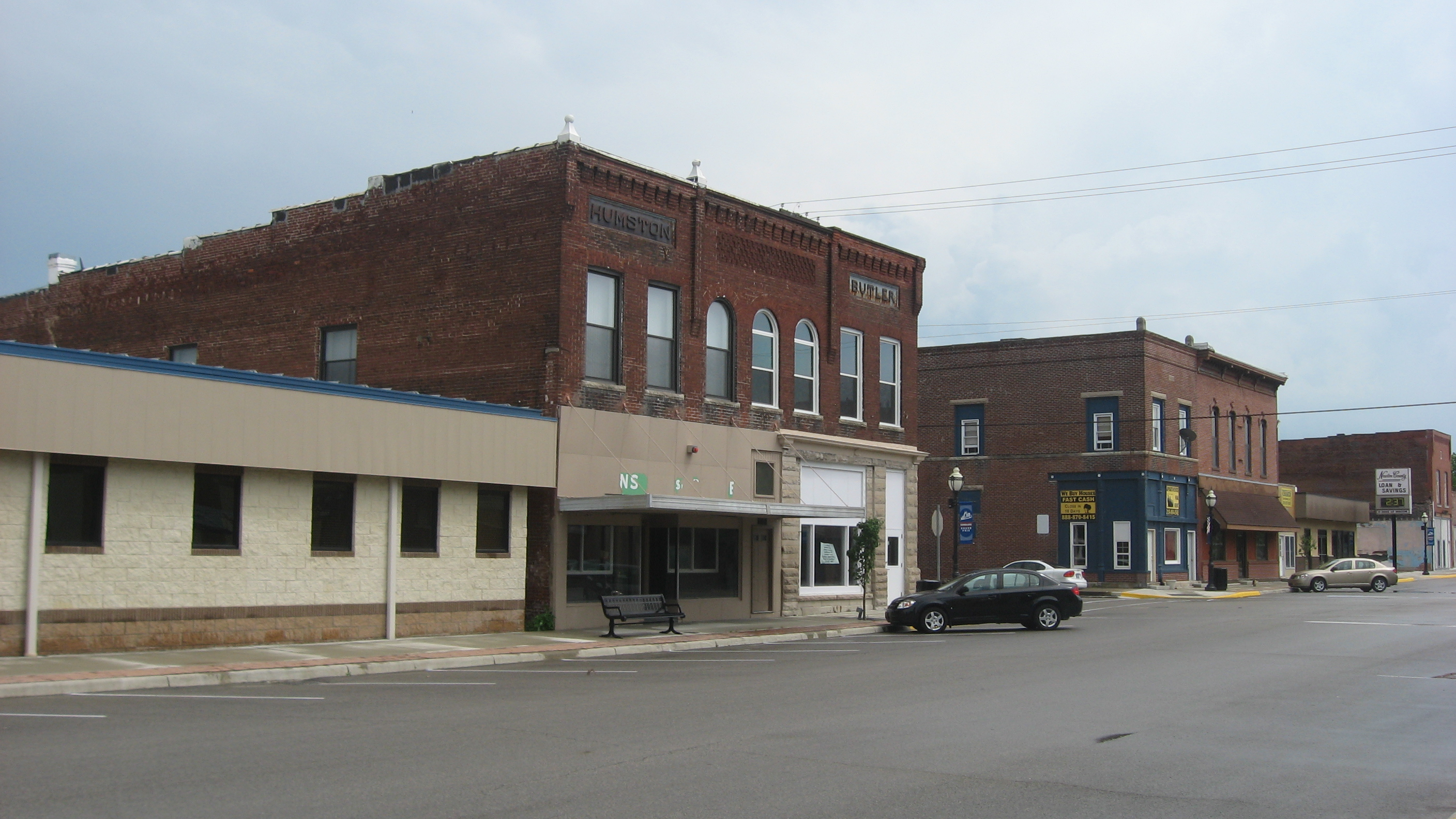
- Newton Street in Goodland, Indiana

- Seal

- Location of Goodland in Newton County, Indiana
- Coordinates: 40°45′52″N 87°17′42″W
- Country: United States
- State: Indiana
- County: Newton
- Township: Grant

Area
  - Total: 0.76 sq mi (1.97 km^{2})
  - Land: 0.76 sq mi (1.97 km^{2})
  - Water: 0 sq mi (0.00 km^{2})
- Elevation: 725 ft (221 m)

Population (2020)
  - Total: 980
  - Density: 1,288.2/sq mi (497.36/km^{2})
- Time zone: UTC-6 (Central (CST))
  - Summer (DST): UTC-5 (CDT)
- ZIP Code: 47948
- Area code: 219
- FIPS code: 18-28332
- GNIS feature ID: 435168
- Website: goodland.in.gov

Goodland is a town in Grant Township in Newton County, Indiana. As of the 2020 census, Goodland had a population of 980.

== History ==
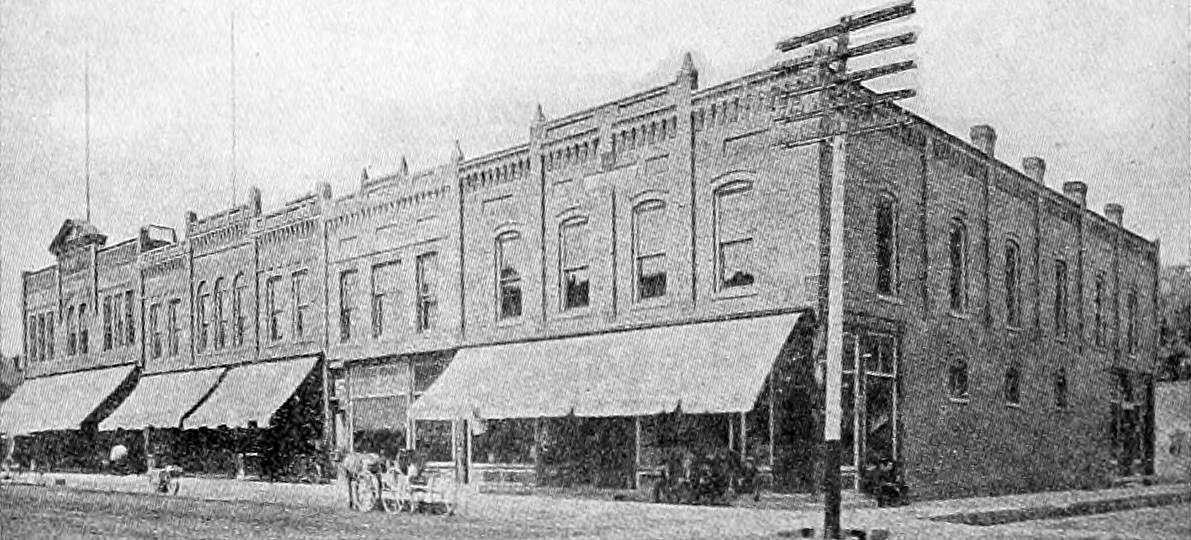
Goodland in 1916

Goodland was laid out in 1861. The town was named from the quality of its soil. A post office has been in operation at Goodland since 1861.

The Goodland-Grant Township Public Library and McCairn-Turner House are listed on the National Register of Historic Places.

== Geography ==
According to the 2010 census, Goodland has a total area of 0.78 square miles (2.02 km^{2}), all land.

Kentland crater, a limestone quarry, is located nearby, between Goodland and Kentland.

== Demographics ==
Historical population
Census	Pop.	Note	%±
1880	628		—
1890	889		41.6%
1900	1,205		35.5%
1910	1,105		−8.3%
1920	1,120		1.4%
1930	978		−12.7%
1940	1,097		12.2%
1950	1,218		11.0%
1960	1,202		−1.3%
1970	1,176		−2.2%
1980	1,200		2.0%
1990	1,033		−13.9%
2000	1,096		6.1%
2010	1,043		−4.8%
2020	980		−6.0%
U.S. Decennial Census

=== 2010 census ===
As of the 2010 census, of 2010, there were 1,043 people, 426 households, and 276 families living in the town. The population density was 1,337.2 inhabitants per square mile (516.3/km^{2}). There were 469 housing units at an average density of 601.3 per square mile (232.2/km^{2}). The racial makeup of the town was 97.5% White, 0.7% African American, 0.4% Native American, 0.5% from other races, and 1.0% from two or more races. Hispanic or Latino of any race were 2.1% of the population.

There were 426 households, of which 31.0% had children under the age of 18 living with them, 46.9% were married couples living together, 10.8% had a female householder with no husband present, 7.0% had a male householder with no wife present, and 35.2% were non-families. 27.9% of all households were made up of individuals, and 13.4% had someone living alone who was 65 years of age or older. The average household size was 2.45 and the average family size was 2.99.

The median age in the town was 42.3 years. 22.7% of residents were under the age of 18; 7.7% were between the ages of 18 and 24; 23.4% were from 25 to 44; 30.1% were from 45 to 64; and 16.1% were 65 years of age or older. The gender makeup of the town was 50.2% male and 49.8% female.

== Education ==
The town has a lending library, the Goodland-Grant Township Public Library.

== Notable people ==
- Eddie Condon, former jazz musician and bandleader
- Joe McConnell, former sportscaster
- Marty Ravellette, armless hero
- Louis Sola, Federal Maritime Commission
- Andy Zimmer, former collegiate basketball player, Indiana Hoosiers
