= Darrow, Illinois =

- Unincorporated community
- Iroquois County's location in Illinois

- Darrow's location in Iroquois County
- Coordinates: 40°43′08″N 87°36′11″W
- Country: United States
- State: Illinois
- County: Iroquois County
- Township: Sheldon Township
- Elevation: 686 ft (209 m)
- ZIP code: 60966
- GNIS feature ID: 422606

Darrow is an unincorporated community in Sheldon Township, Iroquois County, Illinois.

== Geography ==
Darrow is located at 40°43′8.13″N 87°36′11.10″W at an elevation of 686 ft (209 m).
