= Enos, Indiana =

- Unincorporated community
- Location within Indiana Location within the United States
- Coordinates: 41°00′50″N 87°26′57″W
- Country: United States
- State: Indiana
- County: Newton
- Township: McClellan
- Elevation: 669 ft (204 m)
- Time zone: UTC-6 (Central (CST))
  - Summer (DST): UTC-5 (CDT)
- ZIP code: 47963
- Area code: 219
- GNIS feature ID: 434215

Enos is an unincorporated community in McClellan Township, Newton County, in the U.S. state of Indiana.

== History ==
Enos was laid out as a town in 1907.

In 1986, the rural area near Enos, Indiana, received attention in connection with the disappearance and murder of Chicago Outfit figure and Las Vegas Mobster Anthony Spilotro. Spilotro and his brother Michael were later found buried in a cornfield in the vicinity of Enos, bringing brief notoriety to the area. The events surrounding Spilotro's activities in Las Vegas later inspired elements of the 1995 film Casino (1995), directed by Martin Scorsese. In the film, the character Nicky Santoro, who was based in part on Spilotro, is depicted being killed and buried in a Midwestern cornfield, a scene widely interpreted as reflecting the circumstances of Spilotro's death.
