= Sheldon Township, Iroquois County, Illinois =

Sheldon Township
- Township
- Location in Iroquois County

- Iroquois County's location in Illinois
- Coordinates: 40°43′49″N 87°35′16″W
- Country: United States
- State: Illinois
- County: Iroquois
- Established: February 19, 1868

Area
  - Total: 39.67 sq mi (102.7 km^{2})
  - Land: 39.67 sq mi (102.7 km^{2})
  - Water: 0 sq mi (0 km^{2}) 0%
- Elevation: 690 ft (210 m)

Population (2020)
  - Total: 1,239
  - Density: 31.23/sq mi (12.06/km^{2})
- Time zone: UTC-6 (CST)
  - Summer (DST): UTC-5 (CDT)
- ZIP codes: 60953, 60966, 60970
- FIPS code: 17-075-69225

Sheldon Township is one of twenty-six townships in Iroquois County, Illinois, USA. As of the 2020 census, its population was 1,239 and it contained 580 housing units. Sheldon Township was formed from Concord Township on February 19, 1868.

== Geography ==
According to the 2021 census gazetteer files, Sheldon Township has a total area of 39.67 square miles (102.74 km^{2}), all land.

=== Cities, towns, villages ===
- Sheldon

=== Unincorporated towns ===
- Darrow at 40.718925°N 87.603084°W
- Eastburn at 40.773092°N 87.635586°W
- Effner at 40.770592°N 87.526139°W
- Webster at 40.773647°N 87.603918°W

(This list is based on USGS data and may include former settlements.)

=== Cemeteries ===
The township contains Sheldon Cemetery.

=== Major highways ===
- U.S. Route 24

=== Airports and landing strips ===
- Disosway Airport

== Demographics ==
As of the 2020 census there were 1,239 people, 668 households, and 393 families residing in the township. The population density was 31.24 inhabitants per square mile (12.06/km^{2}). There were 580 housing units at an average density of 14.62 per square mile (5.64/km^{2}). The racial makeup of the township was 90.23% White, 0.97% African American, 0.81% Native American, 0.81% Asian, 0.00% Pacific Islander, 1.13% from other races, and 6.05% from two or more races. Hispanic or Latino of any race were 4.60% of the population.

There were 668 households, out of which 24.90% had children under the age of 18 living with them, 36.53% were married couples living together, 14.97% had a female householder with no spouse present, and 41.17% were non-families. 37.00% of all households were made up of individuals, and 12.30% had someone living alone who was 65 years of age or older. The average household size was 2.07 and the average family size was 2.61.

The township's age distribution consisted of 18.5% under the age of 18, 7.0% from 18 to 24, 21% from 25 to 44, 36.7% from 45 to 64, and 16.9% who were 65 years of age or older. The median age was 46.4 years. For every 100 females, there were 92.6 males. For every 100 females age 18 and over, there were 89.9 males.

The median income for a household in the township was $37,273, and the median income for a family was $60,990. Males had a median income of $39,125 versus $30,203 for females. The per capita income for the township was $24,922. About 15.0% of families and 18.6% of the population were below the poverty line, including 27.2% of those under age 18 and 18.6% of those age 65 or over.

Historical population
Census	Pop.	Note	%±
2000	1,513		—
2010	1,374		−9.2%
2020	1,239		−9.8%
U.S. Decennial Census

== Political districts ==
- Illinois' 15th congressional district
- State House District 105
- State Senate District 53
