= Lake Township, Newton County, Indiana =

Lake Township
- Township
- Coordinates: 41°07′49″N 87°27′47″W
- Country: United States
- State: Indiana
- County: Newton

Government
  - Type: Indiana township

Area
  - Total: 39.79 sq mi (103.1 km^{2})
  - Land: 39.78 sq mi (103.0 km^{2})
  - Water: 0 sq mi (0 km^{2})
- Elevation: 653 ft (199 m)

Population (2020)
  - Total: 2,349
  - Density: 59.05/sq mi (22.80/km^{2})
- Time zone: UTC-6 (Central (CST))
  - Summer (DST): UTC-5 (CDT)
- Area code: 219
- FIPS code: 18-40968
- GNIS feature ID: 453537

Lake Township is one of ten townships in Newton County, Indiana, United States. As of the 2020 census, its population was 2,349 and it contained 1,020 housing units.

Historical population
Census	Pop.	Note	%±
1890	462		—
1900	489		5.8%
1910	489		0.0%
1920	488		−0.2%
1930	522		7.0%
1940	906		73.6%
1950	1,010		11.5%
1960	1,450		43.6%
1970	1,762		21.5%
1980	2,311		31.2%
1990	2,208		−4.5%
2000	2,465		11.6%
2010	2,384		−3.3%
2020	2,349		−1.5%
Source: US Decennial Census

== Geography ==
According to the 2010 census, the township has a total area of 39.79 square miles (103.1 km^{2}), all land.

=== Unincorporated towns ===
- Lake Village at 41.1375346°N 87.4486437°W
- Sumava Resorts at 41.1664238°N 87.4391996°W

(This list is based on USGS data and may include former settlements.)
