= Kentland Municipal Airport =

- IATA: KKT; ICAO: none; FAA LID: 50I

Summary
- Airport type: Public
- Owner: Kentland Board of Aviation Commissioners
- Serves: Kentland, Indiana
- Opened: November 1975
- Elevation AMSL: 698 ft (213 m)
- Coordinates: 40°45′31″N 087°25′42″W

Map
- Location of airport in Indiana/United States 50I (the United States)

Runways
| Direction | Length | | Surface |
| Direction | ft | m | Surface |
|---|---|---|---|
| 9/27 | 3,504 | 1,068 | Asphalt |

Statistics (2011)
- Aircraft operations: 5,852
- Based aircraft: 19
- Source: Federal Aviation Administration

Kentland Municipal Airport (IATA: KKT, FAA LID: 50I) is a public use airport located one nautical mile (2 km) southeast of the central business district of Kentland, in Newton County, Indiana, United States. It is owned by the Kentland Board of Aviation Commissioners. This airport was included in the National Plan of Integrated Airport Systems for 2011–2015, which categorized it as a general aviation facility.

== Facilities and aircraft ==
Kentland Municipal Airport covers an area of 50 acres (20 ha) at an elevation of 698 feet (213 m) above mean sea level. It has one runway designated 9/27 with an asphalt surface measuring 3,504 by 50 feet (1,068 x 15 m).

For the 12-month period ending December 31, 2011, the airport had 5,852 aircraft operations, an average of 16 per day: 90% general aviation and 10% air taxi. At that time there were 19 aircraft based at this airport: 63% single-engine, 11% multi-engine, and 26% ultralight.

== See also ==
- List of airports in Indiana
