= Sumava Resorts, Indiana =

- Unincorporated community
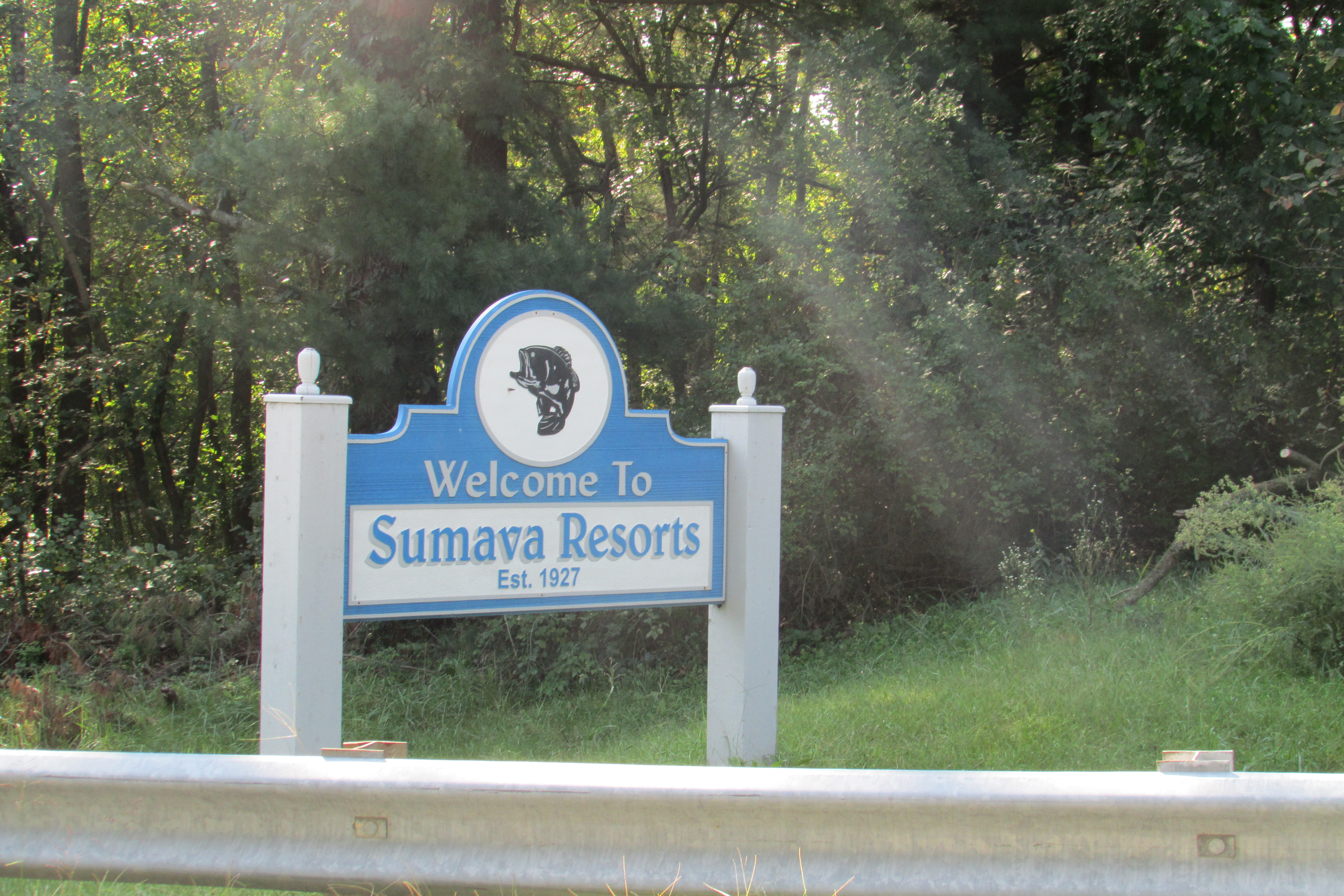
- Entrance to Sumava Resort

- Location within Indiana Location within the United States
- Coordinates: 41°09′56″N 87°26′17″W
- Country: United States
- State: Indiana
- County: Newton
- Township: Lake
- Sumava Resorts: 1927

Area
  - Total: 2.42 sq mi (6.26 km^{2})
  - Land: 2.1 sq mi (5.4 km^{2})
- Elevation: 633 ft (193 m)

Population (2014)
  - Total: 291
- Time zone: UTC-6 (Central (CST))
  - Summer (DST): UTC-5 (CDT)
- ZIP code: 46379
- Area code: 219
- FIPS code: 18-74078
- GNIS feature ID: 2830475

Sumava Resorts is an unincorporated community in Lake Township, Newton County, in the U.S. state of Indiana.

== History ==
Sumava Resorts was laid out in 1926. A post office has been in operation at the community since 1928. A group of Czech immigrants from Chicago formed the Sumava Forest Resorts Inc. It was named for the Bohemian Forest, which in the Czech Republic is called the Šumava Forest.

The resort became a weekend and summer resort for the Chicago community. Special trains would bring the city folks out to Sumava and return each weekend. Lukes' Restaurant & Tavern on County Road N 250 W became the center of activities, with guests dining on duck, roast chicken, dumplings and kraut.

The community's location along the Kankakee River meant that it has been plagued by flooding. Major floods occurred in 1950, 1967, and 1976. A levee break in 1993 brought national attention to the community. The U.S. Army Corps of Engineers designed and constructed a $7 million dike around the community, ending the annual risk of flooding.

== Demographics ==
Historical population
Census	Pop.	Note	%±
2023 (est.)	73

The United States Census Bureau defined Sumava Resorts as a census designated place in the 2022 American Community Survey.
