= McClellan Township, Newton County, Indiana =

McClellan Township
- Township
- Coordinates: 41°02′41″N 87°27′31″W
- Country: United States
- State: Indiana
- County: Newton

Government
  - Type: Indiana township

Area
  - Total: 42.3 sq mi (110 km^{2})
  - Land: 42.3 sq mi (110 km^{2})
  - Water: 0 sq mi (0 km^{2})
- Elevation: 666 ft (203 m)

Population (2020)
  - Total: 223
  - Density: 5.27/sq mi (2.04/km^{2})
- Time zone: UTC-6 (Central (CST))
  - Summer (DST): UTC-5 (CDT)
- Area code: 219
- FIPS code: 18-45594
- GNIS feature ID: 453586

McClellan Township is one of ten townships in Newton County, Indiana. As of the 2020 census, its population was 223 and it contained 71 housing units.

Historical population
| Census | Pop. | Note | %± |
|---|---|---|---|
| 1890 | 178 | | — |
| 1900 | 299 | | 68.0% |
| 1910 | 227 | | −24.1% |
| 1920 | 257 | | 13.2% |
| 1930 | 246 | | −4.3% |
| 1940 | 275 | | 11.8% |
| 1950 | 309 | | 12.4% |
| 1960 | 221 | | −28.5% |
| 1970 | 244 | | 10.4% |
| 1980 | 280 | | 14.8% |
| 1990 | 237 | | −15.4% |
| 2000 | 228 | | −3.8% |
| 2010 | 217 | | −4.8% |
| 2020 | 223 | | 2.8% |
Source: US Decennial Census

== History ==
McClellan Township was established in 1862.

== Geography ==
McClellan township used to include Beaver Lake with its Bogus islands, before it was drained.

According to the 2010 census, the township has a total area of 42.3 square miles (110 km^{2}), all land.

=== Unincorporated towns ===
- Enos at 41.0139228°N 87.4491973°W

(This list is based on USGS data and may include former settlements.)
