= Thayer, Indiana =

- Unincorporated community and Census-designated place
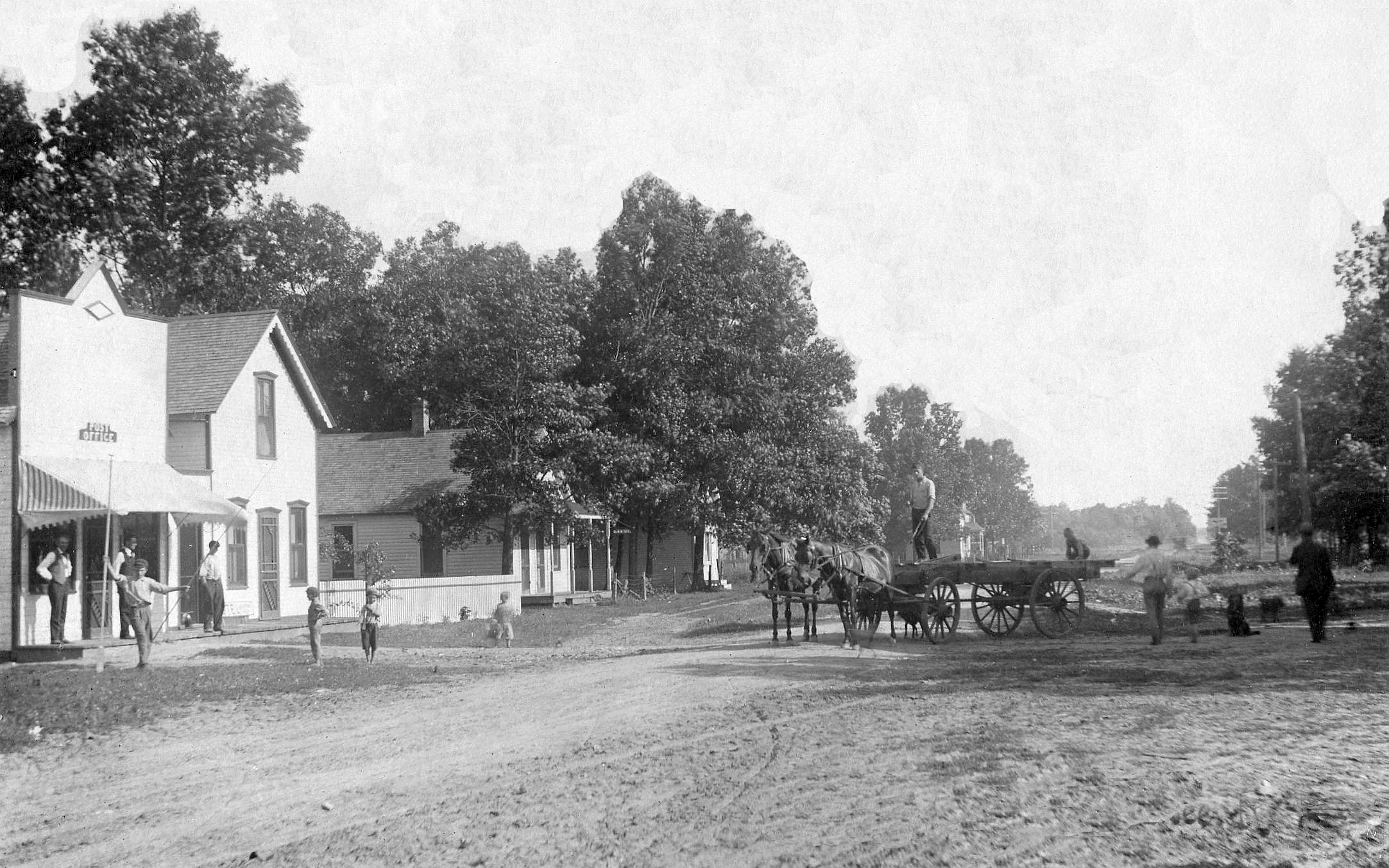
- Thayer, 1908

- Location within Indiana Location within the United States
- Coordinates: 41°10′26″N 87°19′46″W
- Country: United States
- State: Indiana
- County: Newton
- Township: Lincoln
- Elevation: 643 ft (196 m)
- Time zone: UTC-6 (Central (CST))
  - Summer (DST): UTC-5 (CDT)
- ZIP code: 46381
- Area code: 219
- FIPS code: 18-75518
- GNIS feature ID: 2830476

Thayer is an unincorporated community in Lincoln Township, Newton County, in the U.S. state of Indiana.

== History ==
Thayer was laid out as a town in 1882. The community was named for a first settler. A post office has been in operation at Thayer since 1881.

Thayer, along with Shelby, Sumava Resorts and other small Kankakee River communities, has historically had to contend with periodic flooding from the river.

== Demographics ==
Historical population
| Census | Pop. | Note | %± |
|---|---|---|---|
| 2023 (est.) | 447 |

The United States Census Bureau defined Thayer as a census designated place in the 2022 American Community Survey.
