= Scott-Lucas House =

Historic house in Indiana, United States

- U.S. National Register of Historic Places
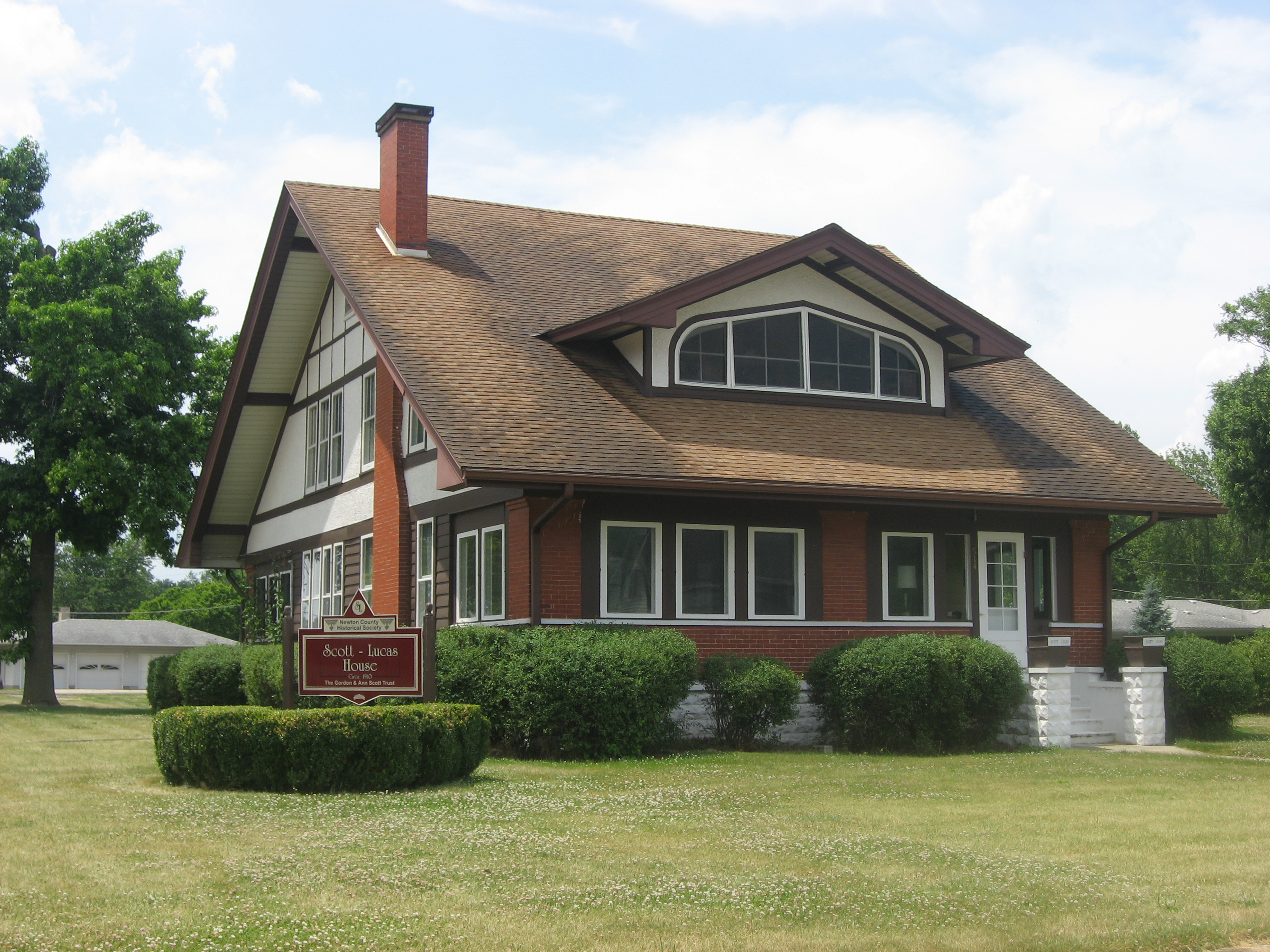
- Scott-Lucas House, June 2012

- Location within Indiana Location within the United States
- Location: 514 S. Main St., Morocco, Indiana
- Coordinates: 40°56′27″N 87°27′19″W
- Area: less than one acre
- Built: 1912
- Architect: Hall, C.H.
- Architectural style: Bungalow/craftsman
- NRHP reference No.: 03000544
- Added to NRHP: June 22, 2003

Scott-Lucas House is a historic home located at Morocco, Indiana. It was built in 1912, and is a 1 1/2-story, square, Bungalow / American Craftsman style brick dwelling. It features wood clapboard siding, half-timbering and stucco, and steeply pitched side-gable roof with dormer. It was restored in 2000 and is open as a house museum owned by the Newton County Historical Society.

It was listed on the National Register of Historic Places in 2003.
