= Goodland-Grant Township Public Library =

- U.S. National Register of Historic Places
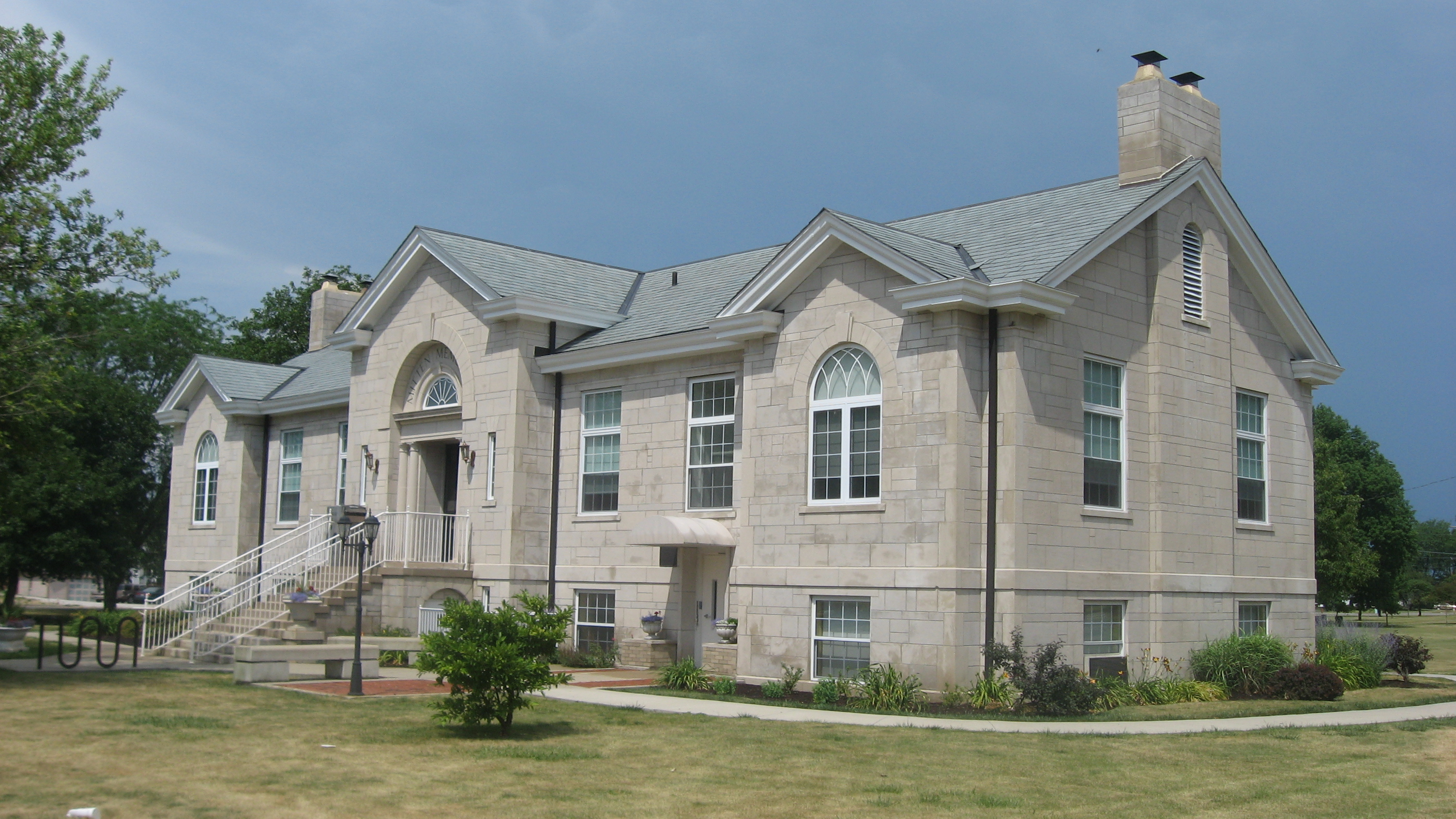
- Goodland-Grant Township Public Library, June 2012

- Location within Indiana Location within the United States
- Location: 111 S. Newton St., Goodland, Indiana
- Coordinates: 40°45′54″N 87°17′35″W
- Area: 2 acres (0.81 ha)
- Built: 1931
- Architect: Holland, Robert George; Buck, John
- Architectural style: Colonial Revival
- NRHP reference No.: 04001103
- Added to NRHP: September 29, 2004

Goodland-Grant Township Public Library, also known as the Mitten Memorial Building, is a historic library building located at Goodland, Indiana. It was built in 1931, and is a one-story, rectangular, Colonial Revival style steel frame building on a raised basement. It has hollow tile walls, is sheathed in limestone, and has a slate gable roof.

It was listed on the National Register of Historic Places in 2004.
