= Newton County Courthouse (Indiana) =

- U.S. National Register of Historic Places
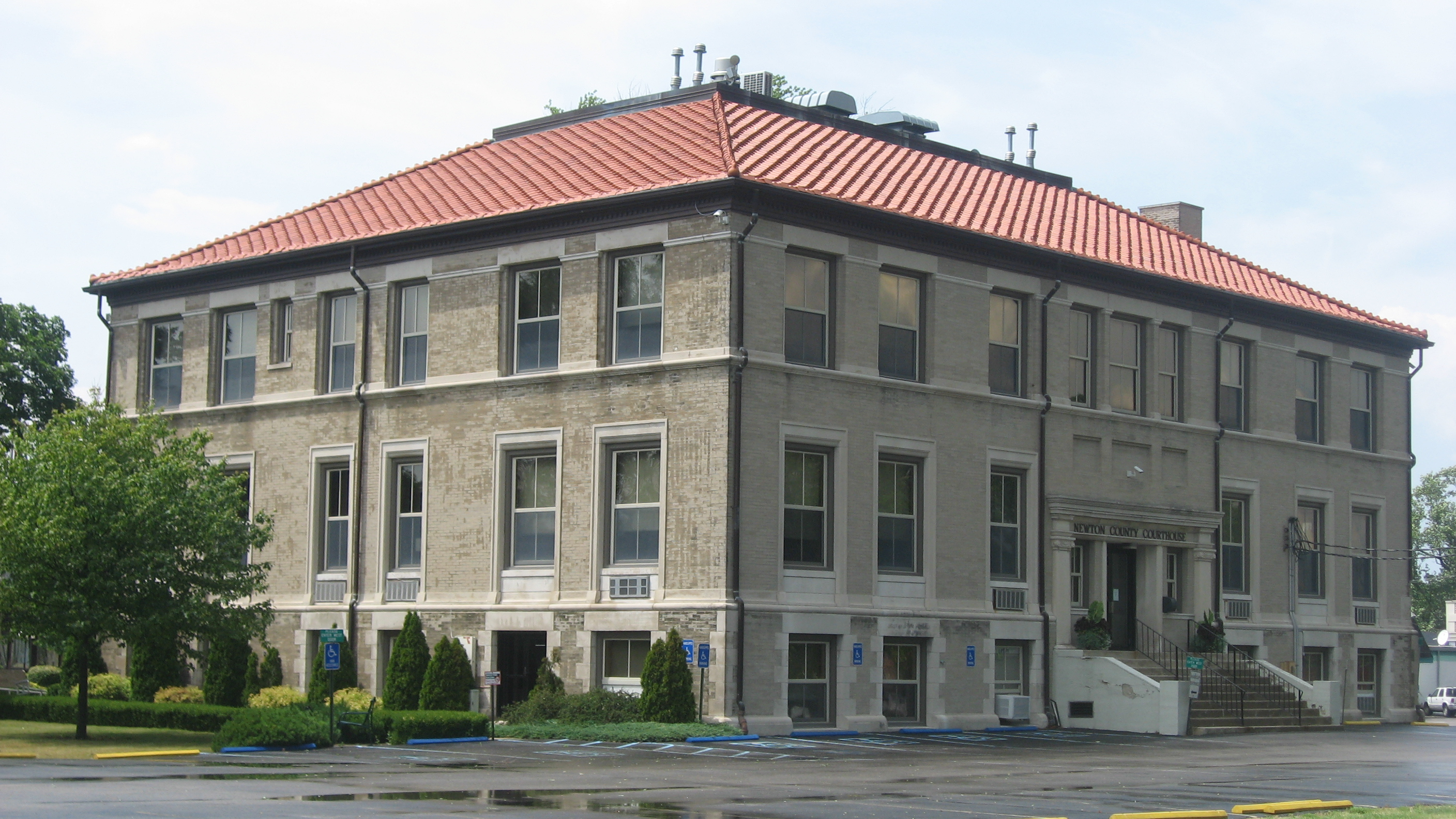
- The courthouse seen from the southeast

- Location within Indiana Location within the United States
- Location: One Courthouse Square, Kentland, Indiana
- Coordinates: 40°46′8″N 87°26′44″W
- Area: less than one acre
- Built: 1906
- Architect: Joseph T. Hutton; Erick Lund
- Architectural style: Renaissance
- NRHP reference No.: 08000742
- Added to NRHP: August 1, 2008

The Newton County Courthouse is a historic courthouse located at Kentland, Indiana, United States. The original Newton County was formed by statute on February 7, 1835, and was a roughly square area some 30 miles on a side, encompassing what is now the northern half of the county, the northern half of Jasper County, and a large section to the north. The northern border was cut back to the Kankakee River on February 1, 1836, with all land north of the Kankakee River going to Lake and Porter counties. The county was abolished and combined with Jasper County in 1839. On December 8, 1859, the county was recreated and the borders were redrawn to essentially their current state.

The current Newton County Courthouse was built in 1906, and is a three-story, rectangular, Renaissance Revival style brick building with limestone trim. It has an architectural tile hipped roof. The front facade features round arched windows on the third floor, projecting entrance pavilion, and a pedimented parapet.

It was listed on the National Register of Historic Places in 2008.
