= McCairn-Turner House =

Historic house in Indiana, United States

- Formerly listed on the U.S. National Register of Historic Places
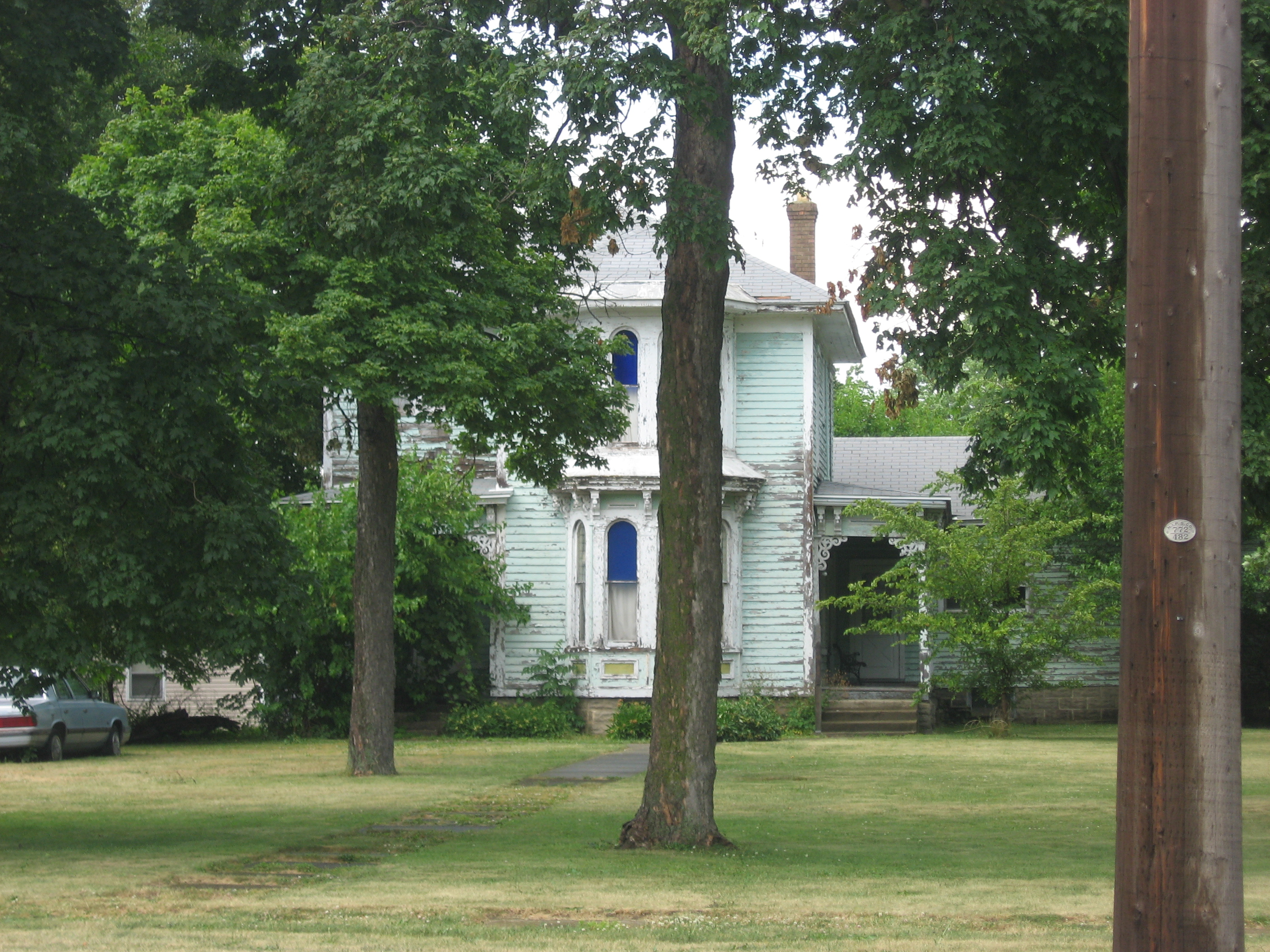
- McCairn-Turner House in 2012

- Location within Indiana Location within the United States
- Location: 124 W. Jasper St., Goodland, Indiana
- Coordinates: 40°45′58″N 87°17′45″W
- Area: less than one acre
- Built: c. 1869, 1875, 1886–1887, 1908
- Architectural style: Italianate
- NRHP reference No.: 94000232

Significant dates
- Added to NRHP: March 25, 1994
- Removed from NRHP: May 22, 2023

McCairn-Turner House, also known as the Gilman-Turner House, is a historic home located at Goodland, Indiana. The original section was built about 1869, received an addition about 1875, and renovated in the Italianate style in 1886–1887. It is a two-story, frame dwelling sheathed in clapboard siding. A kitchen addition was constructed in 1908. It features a two-story, three sided projecting bay and one-story full length porch.

It was listed on the National Register of Historic Places in 1994, and was delisted in 2023.

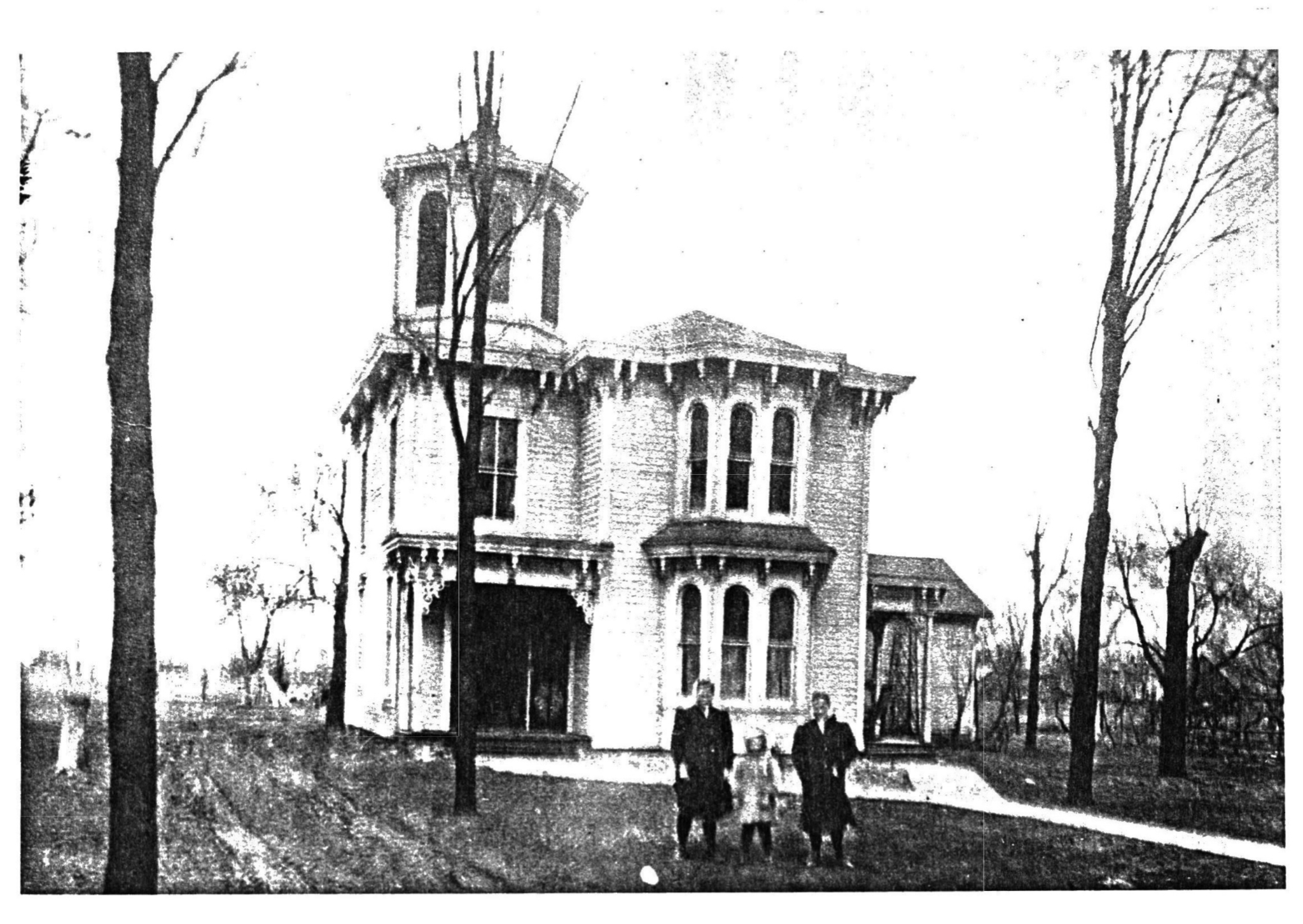
McCairn-Turner House, prior to 1945 remodel
