= Lake Village, Indiana =

CDP in Newton County, Indiana, United States

- Census-designated place
- Location of Lake Village in Newton County, Indiana.
- Coordinates: 41°07′30″N 87°26′17″W
- Country: United States
- State: Indiana
- County: Newton
- Township: Lake

Area
  - Total: 3.94 sq mi (10.21 km^{2})
  - Land: 3.94 sq mi (10.21 km^{2})
  - Water: 0 sq mi (0.00 km^{2})
- Elevation: 656 ft (200 m)

Population (2020)
  - Total: 748
  - Density: 189.7/sq mi (73.23/km^{2})
- Time zone: UTC-6 (Central (CST))
  - Summer (DST): UTC-5 (CDT)
- ZIP code: 46349
- Area code: 219
- FIPS code: 18-41652
- GNIS feature ID: 2393086

Lake Village is a census-designated place (CDP) in Lake Township, Newton County, in the U.S. state of Indiana. As of the 2020 census, Lake Village had a population of 748.

== History ==
Lake Village was laid out in 1876. The town did not grow much until the railroad was built through it in 1905. A post office has been in operation at Lake Village since 1876.

=== 2026 tornado ===
Lake Village was struck by a long tracked and intense EF3 tornado during the late evening of March 10, 2026, killing two and injuring several others. The tornado also killed one person in nearby Aroma Park, Illinois and was part of a larger tornado outbreak across the Midwest and Central United States.

== Geography ==
According to the United States Census Bureau, the CDP has a total area of 4.0 square miles (10 km^{2}), all land.

== Demographics ==
Historical population
Census	Pop.	Note	%±
2020	748		—
U.S. Decennial Census

As of the census of 2000, there were 855 people, 292 households, and 221 families residing in the CDP. The population density was 215.0 inhabitants per square mile (83.0/km^{2}). There were 305 housing units at an average density of 76.7 per square mile (29.6/km^{2}). The racial makeup of the CDP was 93.22% White, 0.12% African American, 1.87% Native American, 0.23% Asian, 2.57% from other races, and 1.99% from two or more races. Hispanic or Latino of any race were 3.74% of the population.

There were 292 households, out of which 38.7% had children under the age of 18 living with them, 59.2% were married couples living together, 12.0% had a female householder with no husband present, and 24.0% were non-families. 17.5% of all households were made up of individuals, and 8.9% had someone living alone who was 65 years of age or older. The average household size was 2.93 and the average family size was 3.33.

In the CDP, the population was spread out, with 29.9% under the age of 18, 9.4% from 18 to 24, 30.5% from 25 to 44, 20.6% from 45 to 64, and 9.6% who were 65 years of age or older. The median age was 34 years. For every 100 females, there were 96.1 males. For every 100 females age 18 and over, there were 96.4 males.

The median income for a household in the CDP was $39,474, and the median income for a family was $50,179. Males had a median income of $50,161 versus $21,688 for females. The per capita income for the CDP was $17,280. About 2.6% of families and 5.2% of the population were below the poverty line, including 1.7% of those under age 18 and 10.5% of those age 65 or over.

== Education ==
Lake Village is in the North Newton School Corporation.

Lake Village has a public library, a branch of the Newton County Public Library.
