= Seller's Standard Station and Pullman Diner =

- U.S. National Register of Historic Places
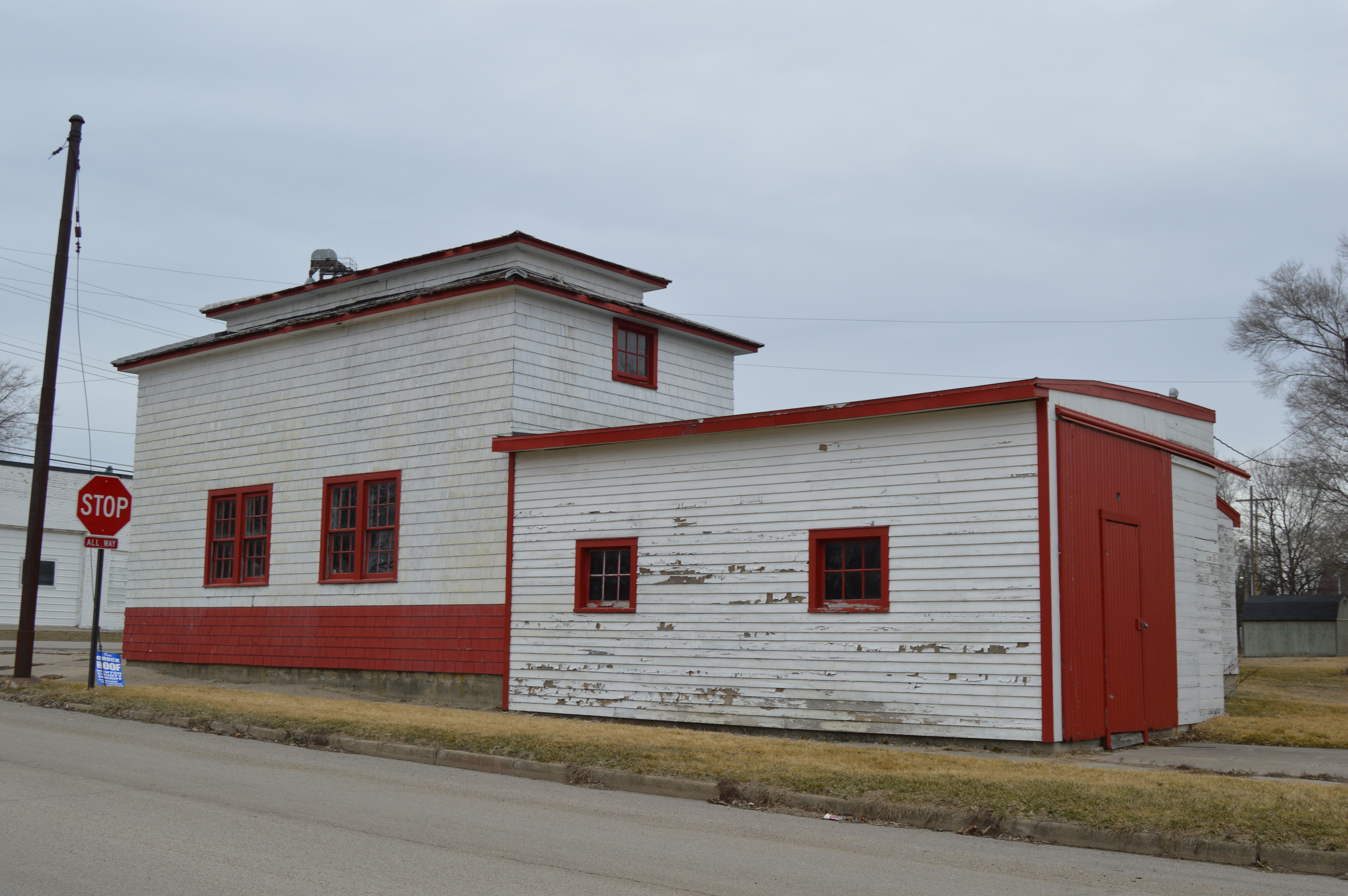
- Seller's Standard Station and Pullman Diner, March 2015

- Location within Indiana Location within the United States
- Location: 101 and 103 N. Polk St., Morocco, Indiana
- Coordinates: 40°56′47″N 87°27′00″W
- Area: less than one acre
- Built: 1930, 1936, 1937, 1940, 1950, 1956
- Architectural style: Bungalow/craftsman, diner
- NRHP reference No.: 14000808
- Added to NRHP: September 30, 2014

Seller's Standard Station and Pullman Diner is a historic service station and diner complex located in Morocco, Newton County, Indiana. The Pullman diner was built in 1930, and expanded about 1935 with the service station addition. A two-story service bay was added in 1940, a large room about 1955, and a large drive-in garage in 1966. The original buildings are representative of two vernacular structures with Bungalow / American Craftsman style design elements. The complex provided essential services along the former route of U.S. Route 41.

It was listed on the National Register of Historic Places in 2014.
