= Morocco, Indiana =

- Town
- Flag Seal

- Location of Morocco in Newton County, Indiana.
- Coordinates: 40°56′40″N 87°27′01″W
- Country: United States
- State: Indiana
- County: Newton
- Township: Beaver

Area
  - Total: 1.07 sq mi (2.76 km^{2})
  - Land: 1.07 sq mi (2.76 km^{2})
  - Water: 0 sq mi (0.00 km^{2})
- Elevation: 682 ft (208 m)

Population (2020)
  - Total: 1,081
  - Density: 1,014.4/sq mi (391.68/km^{2})
- Time zone: UTC-6 (Central (CST))
  - Summer (DST): UTC-5 (CDT)
- ZIP code: 47963
- Area code: 219
- FIPS code: 18-51138
- GNIS feature ID: 2396782
- Website: www.townofmorocco.in.gov

Morocco is a town in Beaver Township, Newton County, in the U.S. state of Indiana. As of the 2020 census, Morocco had a population of 1,081.

== History ==
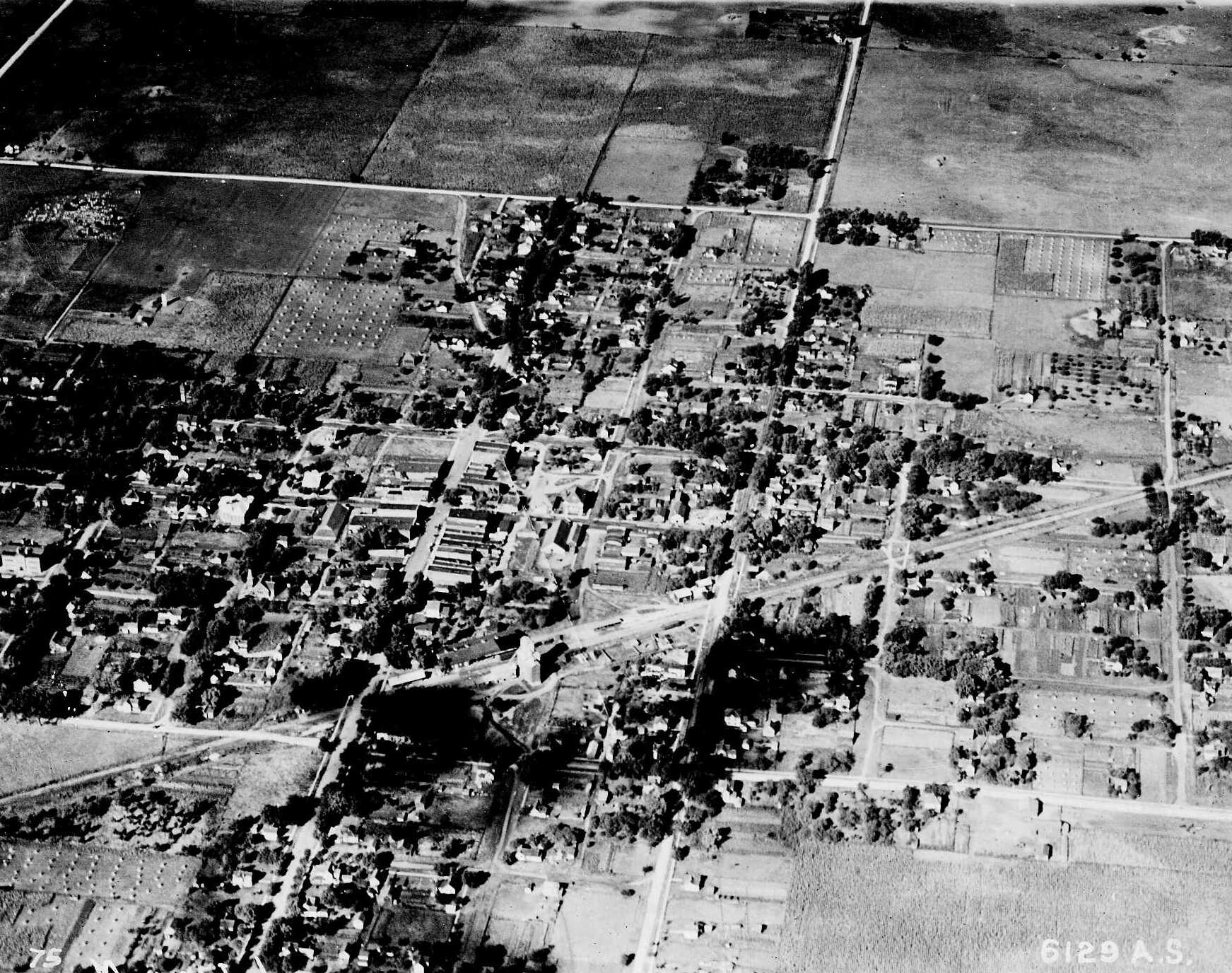
Morocco in 1919

Morocco was laid out in 1851. The town was named after Morocco, for a traveler's Moroccan red boots. A post office has been in operation at the town since 1859.

The Scott-Lucas House and Seller's Standard Station and Pullman Diner are listed on the National Register of Historic Places.

== Geography ==
According to the 2010 census, Morocco has a total area of 1.13 square miles (2.93 km^{2}), all land.

== Demographics ==
Historical population
Census	Pop.	Note	%±
1880	174		—
1890	397		128.2%
1900	920		131.7%
1910	927		0.8%
1920	1,064		14.8%
1930	1,006		−5.5%
1940	1,151		14.4%
1950	1,141		−0.9%
1960	1,341		17.5%
1970	1,285		−4.2%
1980	1,348		4.9%
1990	1,044		−22.6%
2000	1,127		8.0%
2010	1,129		0.2%
2020	1,081		−4.3%
U.S. Decennial Census

=== 2020 census ===
As of the 2020 census, Morocco had a population of 1,081. The median age was 44.0 years. 21.0% of residents were under the age of 18 and 21.5% of residents were 65 years of age or older. For every 100 females there were 101.3 males, and for every 100 females age 18 and over there were 101.9 males age 18 and over.

0.0% of residents lived in urban areas, while 100.0% lived in rural areas.

There were 443 households in Morocco, of which 26.4% had children under the age of 18 living in them. Of all households, 43.6% were married-couple households, 21.7% were households with a male householder and no spouse or partner present, and 25.7% were households with a female householder and no spouse or partner present. About 31.9% of all households were made up of individuals and 15.6% had someone living alone who was 65 years of age or older.

There were 493 housing units, of which 10.1% were vacant. The homeowner vacancy rate was 2.9% and the rental vacancy rate was 6.4%.

Racial composition as of the 2020 census
Race	Number	Percent
White	973	90.0%
Black or African American	3	0.3%
American Indian and Alaska Native	4	0.4%
Asian	3	0.3%
Native Hawaiian and Other Pacific Islander	0	0.0%
Some other race	19	1.8%
Two or more races	79	7.3%
Hispanic or Latino (of any race)	49	4.5%

=== 2010 census ===
As of the census of 2010, there were 1,129 people, 463 households, and 299 families living in the town. The population density was 999.1 inhabitants per square mile (385.8/km^{2}). There were 526 housing units at an average density of 465.5 per square mile (179.7/km^{2}). The racial makeup of the town was 99.1% White, 0.1% African American, 0.1% Native American, 0.2% Asian, 0.2% from other races, and 0.4% from two or more races. Hispanic or Latino of any race were 2.2% of the population.

There were 463 households, of which 30.2% had children under the age of 18 living with them, 47.7% were married couples living together, 9.7% had a female householder with no husband present, 7.1% had a male householder with no wife present, and 35.4% were non-families. 29.8% of all households were made up of individuals, and 15.5% had someone living alone who was 65 years of age or older. The average household size was 2.44 and the average family size was 2.97.

The median age in the town was 40.5 years. 23.3% of residents were under the age of 18; 7.4% were between the ages of 18 and 24; 24.5% were from 25 to 44; 26.6% were from 45 to 64; and 18.2% were 65 years of age or older. The gender makeup of the town was 50.5% male and 49.5% female.

=== 2000 census ===
As of the census of 2000, there were 1,127 people, 499 households, and 296 families living in the town. The population density was 1,947.0 inhabitants per square mile (751.7/km^{2}). There were 508 housing units at an average density of 877.6 per square mile (338.8/km^{2}). The racial makeup of the town was 98.31% White, 0.09% African American, 0.27% Native American, 0.09% Asian, 0.98% from other races, and 0.27% from two or more races. Hispanic or Latino of any race were 1.86% of the populations.

There were 469 households, out of which 27.9% had children under the age of 18 living with them, 49.7% were married couples living together, 9.6% had a female householder with no husband present, and 36.7% were non-families. 31.8% of all households were made up of individuals, and 19.0% had someone living alone who was 65 years of age or older. The average household size was 2.40 and the average family size was 3.04.

In the town, the population was spread out, with 24.3% under the age of 18, 9.8% from 18 to 24, 26.4% from 25 to 44, 22.0% from 45 to 64, and 17.5% who were 65 years of age or older. The median age was 37 years. For every 100 females, there were 94.0 males. For every 100 females age 18 and over, there were 87.5 males.

The median income for a household in the town was $32,176, and the median income for a family was $40,089. Males had a median income of $32,109 versus $20,625 for females. The per capita income for the town was $17,776. About 6.1% of families and 9.3% of the population were below the poverty line, including 6.6% of those under age 18 and 12.2% of those age 65 or over.

== Education ==
Morocco is in the North Newton School Corporation. Morocco Elementary School is in Morocco. North Newton Junior-Senior High School, the public high school of the district, is located north of Morocco CDP and has a Morocco postal address.

Morocco has a public library, a branch of the Newton County Public Library.

== Notable person ==
- Sam Rice, Major League Baseball Hall of Famer
