= Kentland crater =

Impact structure in Indiana, United States

Coordinates: 40°45′N 87°24′W

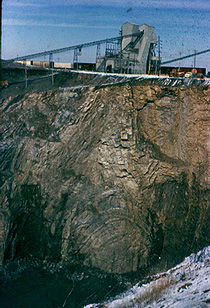
- Deformation involving bending and overturning is evident in the layered limestones exposed by quarrying at the Kentland impact structure.

- Location within the United States Location within Indiana
- Location: Kentland, Indiana, USA

Impact crater structure
- Confidence: Confirmed
- Diameter: 13 kilometres (8.1 mi)
- Age: < 97 Ma
- Exposed: Yes
- Drilled: Yes

The Kentland structure, also known as the Kentland crater or the Kentland disturbed area, is an impact structure located near the town of Kentland in Newton County, Indiana, United States.

It was discovered about 1880 when two farmers began to quarry crushed rock there. The presence of shatter cones and deformed bedrock led geologists to conclude by the late 1960s that the Kentland structure is a deeply eroded impact structure, rather than volcanic in origin. Deformation at the site is so great that vertical contacts between normally horizontal rock formations of different ages are common.

The structure itself is a circular dome, about 7.24 km (4.50 mi) in diameter, deeply eroded and buried in glacial debris. Its age is estimated to be less than 97 million years (Cretaceous or younger). The Shakopee dolomite at the center of the structure is about 450 million years old (Ordovician period) and is uplifted about 2,000 feet higher than the level of the same rock in the surrounding area. The entire disturbed area is about 13 km (8.1 mi) in diameter.

The estimated age is in dispute.

- ‘"97 MYA‘" Late Cretaceous Period of the Mesozoic Era
- ‘"300 MYA‘"= Bzhelian or Late Pennsylvanian Epoch (Carboniferous Period) of the Paleozoic Era

This impact structure was studied in 1978. John Weber and his associates presented fission track dating of apatite from this impact structure. Coesite and shatter cones are found in the uplift near its center. The impact structure is exposed to the surface, resulting in erosion. It is currently being worked as a quarry.

== Description ==
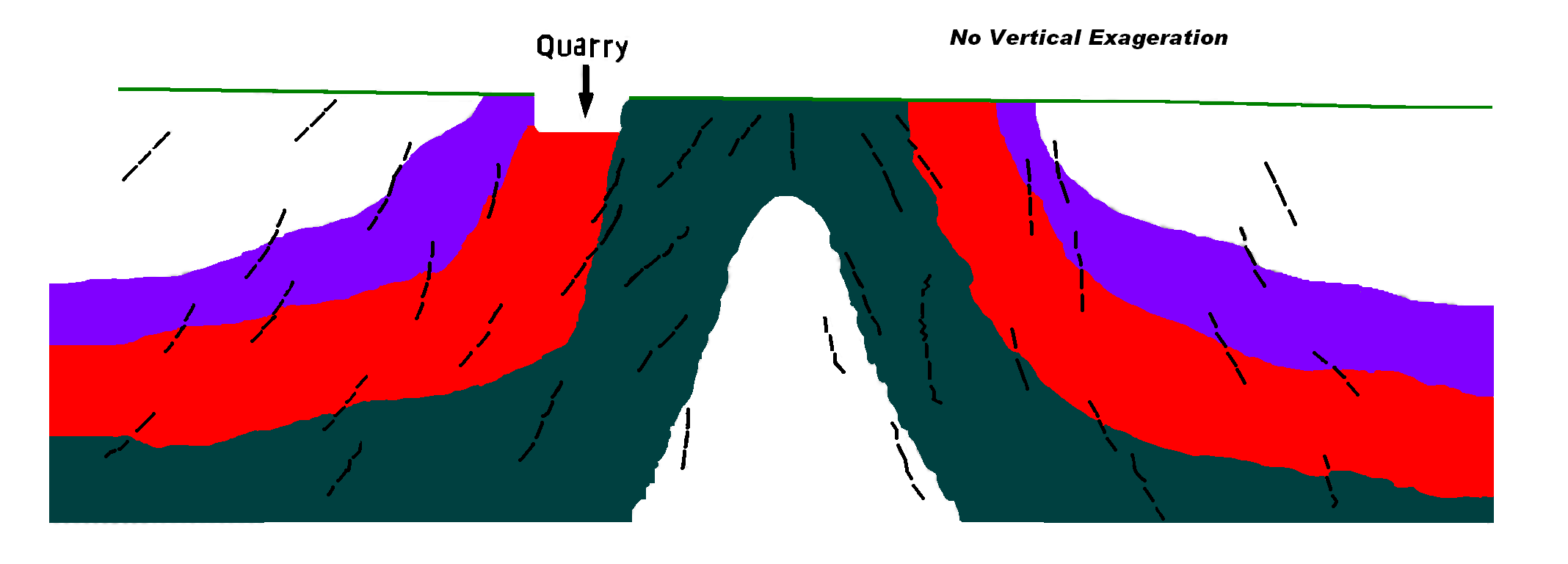
Based on the diagram presented in the report - Landy, R.T. and W.R. Van Schmus; A structural study of the Kentland, Indiana Impact site; Dept of Geology, University of Kansas; Lawrence, Kansas’ 1978

The impact site is located 4 kilometres (2.5 mi) east of Kentland, Indiana, in Newton County. The disturbance is 12.5 kilometres (7.8 mi) in diameter. The bedrock has a thin layer of glacial till, with a maximum depth of 40 metres (130 ft) in the depression ring. The bedrock around the impact structure is generally flat with a slight dip towards the southwest and the Illinois Basin. The upper layers are Lower Mississippian from the Carboniferous period and Upper Devonian are relatively flat throughout this area of Indiana with the exception of impact site. The core of the site is Ordovician rocks in the Prairie du Chien through Maquoketa Groups. Surrounding the core is Silurian rocks of Sexton Cr Dolomite and Kokomo Limestone. This uplifted core pierces the New Albany Shale of the Devonian age and the Mississippian age New Providence Shale and Rockford Limestone. Prior to quarry operations, research estimates that there has been 300 metres (980 ft) of erosion since the initial event, followed by a shallow deposit of glacial till during the Wisconsin Glacial Period. The quarry operations have extracted the upper Ordovician carbonates of the Platteville and Galena (Prairie due Chien) groups along the northern edge since 1906.

== Structure ==
The structure is a deeply eroded complex crater. Since the original impact, the structure has eroded over 300 metres (980 ft), eliminating the crater and other surface elements.

Ring anticline

The ring surrounds the impact site, separating it from the surrounding flat-lying regional bedrock. The ring is about 6.2 kilometres (3.9 mi) in radius around the central disconformity.

Ring depression

The ring depression is the result of the displacement of materials at lower levels to fill the void created as the central uplift rose. Studies at other sites similar to the Kentland structure have found the depression to be the equivalent of the material that would have moved under the uplift as it occurred.

Central Uplift

A cross section of the uplift, beginning on the outer edge, moving towards the middle, is shown in the image above.

== See also ==
- List of impact craters on Earth

== Additional sources ==
- Cohen, A.J., Bunch, T.E., and Reid, 1961, Coesite discoveries establish cryptovolcanics as fossil meteorite craters: Science, v.134, p. 1624-1625.
- Collet, J., 1883, Geological survey of Newton County: Ind. Dept Geol. and Nat. Hist., 12th Ann. Report, p. 58-59.
- Dietz, R.S., 1947, Meteorite impact suggested by orientation of shatter cones at the Kentland, Indiana, disturbance: Science, v.105, n.2714, p. 42-43.
- Dietz, R.S., 1960, Meteorite impact suggested by shatter cones in rock: Science, v.131, n.3416, p. 1781-1784.
- Dietz, R.S., 1963, Cryptoexplosion structures-a discussion: Am. Jour. Sci., v.261, p. 650-664.
- Dietz, Robert S.; Shatter Cones in Cryptoexplosion Structures (Meteorite Impact?); The Journal of Geology; Vol. 67, No. 5 (Sep., 1959), pp. 496–505
- Gutschick, R. C., Geology of the Kentland dome structurally complex anomaly, northwestern Indiana (Field Trip 5). Field trip in Midwestern Geology, Annual Meeting, Geological Society of America, Indianapolis, v. 1, pp. 105–138. 1983.
- Gutschick, R. C., Geology of the Kentland structural anomaly, northwestern Indiana—update. Purdue University, Department of Geosciences, and Geological Society of America, North-central Section, Guidebook 4, 38 p. 1982.
- Gutschick, R.C., 1976, Geology of the Kentland structural anomaly, northwestern Indiana: Guidebook for 1976, North-Central GSA Meeting, 59 p.
- Gutschick, R. C., Geology of the Kentland impact structural anomaly. Meteoritical Society, 35th Annual Meeting, Guidebook for Field Trip. 1972.
- Gutschick, R. C., Geology of the Kentland impact structural anomaly, northwestern Indiana. Shaver, R.H. and Sunderman, J.A., eds., Field Guide for the National Association of Geology Teachers, East-central Section, 20 p. 1971.
- Gutschick, R. C., The stratigraphy and structure of the Kentland impact anomaly, Indiana (abstract). The Geological Society of America, v. 2, pp. 564–565. 1970.
- Gutschick, R. C., The Kentland structural anomaly, Indiana. Geology from Chicago to Cincinnati, Geological Society of America Guidebook for Field Trips, v. 2, pp. 12–17. 1961.
- Laney, R.T., and W.R. Vanschmus, 1978. "A structural study of the Kentland, Indiana impact site" in Lunar and Planetary Science 9, pp 627–629.
- Mark J. Camp and Graham T. Richardson, Roadside Geology of Indiana, (Mountain Press Publishing Co.: Missoula, Montana, 1999), pp. 215–216. ISBN 0-87842-396-6
