= John Newton (soldier) =

American soldier (1755–1780)

Sgt. John Newton (1755–1780) was a soldier of the American Revolutionary War who was popularized by Parson Weems in his school books in the early 19th century. Newton served under Brigadier General Francis Marion, the famous "Swamp Fox". Today Newton appears to have been a very minor figure. However, place names across the United States demonstrate his former fame. He is considered one of the popular fictionalized heroic enlisted men of the American Revolution.

Parson Weems' story describes Newton bravely saving a group of American prisoners from execution by capturing their British guards at the 1779 Siege of Savannah. However, there is no known contemporary account of this rescue, and the only source is the very unreliable Parson Weems. Supposedly, according to Lieutenant Colonel Peter Horry, who took part in the campaign, "Newton was a Thief & a Villain."

Newton's tale is similar to the true story of Sergeant William Jasper, who was a genuine hero but his exploits were exaggerated by Weems. Five states (Indiana, Missouri, Texas, Mississippi, and Georgia) have a Newton and Jasper County adjacent to each other, as though they were regarded as a pair. Several other states have a Jasper County with a county seat of Newton, or vice versa.
