= Kentland, Indiana =

- Town
- Town of Kentland
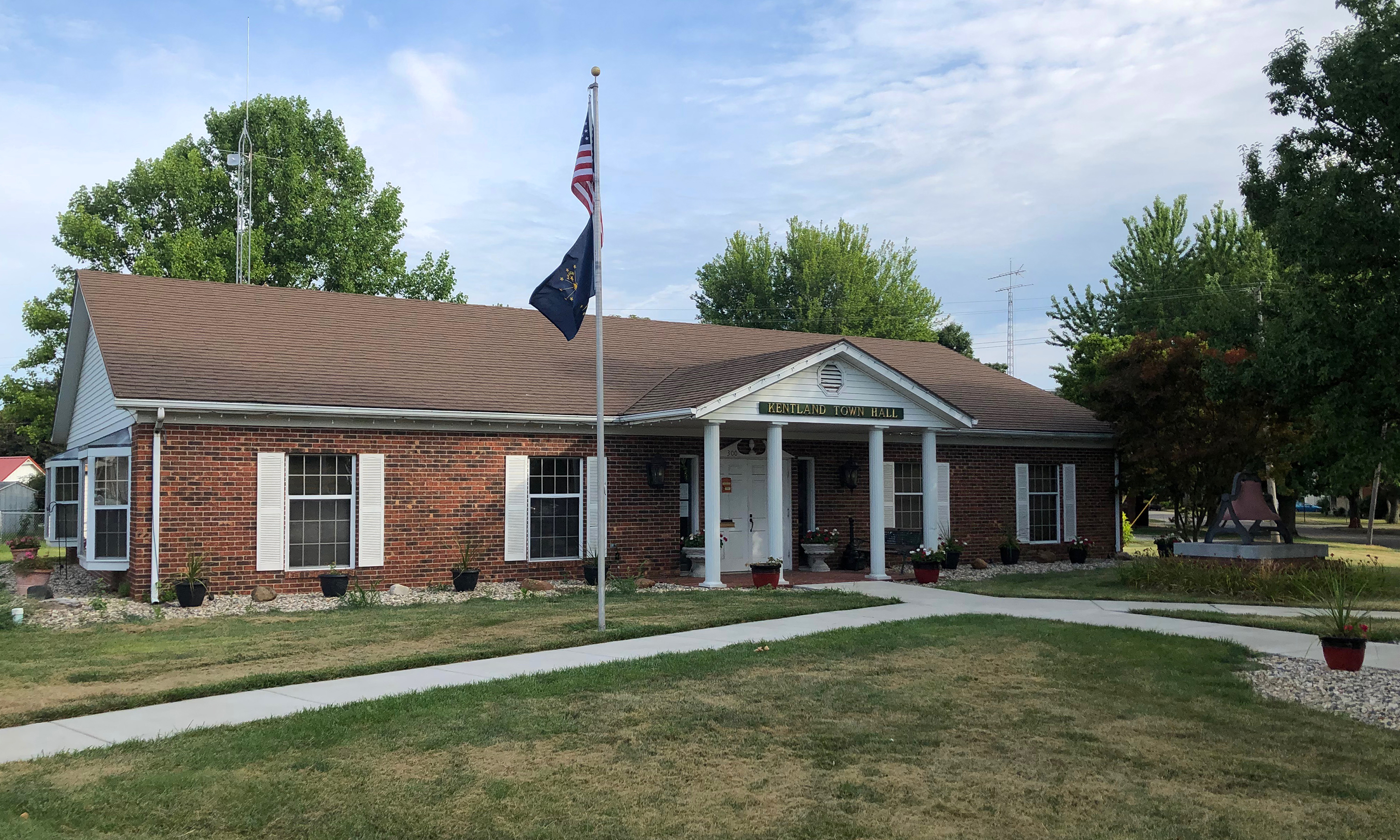
- Town hall

- Flag Icon

- Location of Kentland in Newton County, Indiana.
- Coordinates: 40°46′26″N 87°26′47″W
- Country: United States
- State: Indiana
- County: Newton
- Township: Jefferson

Area
  - Total: 1.35 sq mi (3.50 km^{2})
  - Land: 1.35 sq mi (3.50 km^{2})
  - Water: 0 sq mi (0.00 km^{2})
- Elevation: 676 ft (206 m)

Population (2020)
  - Total: 1,641
  - Density: 1,215.8/sq mi (469.41/km^{2})
- Time zone: UTC-6 (Central (CST))
  - Summer (DST): UTC-5 (CDT)
- ZIP code: 47951
- Area code: 219
- FIPS code: 18-39546
- GNIS feature ID: 2397015
- Website: kentland.in.gov

Kentland is a town in Jefferson Township, Newton County, Indiana, United States. The population was 1,641 at the 2020 census.

== History ==
The town was founded in 1860 as "Kent", though this name was soon lengthened to Kentland. The name honors Alexander J. Kent, who acquired the then marshy plat and prepared it for development. The town is the county seat of Newton County.

Kentland is the birthplace of famous turn-of-the-century humorist George Ade, author of such plays as The College Widow, Artie, and The Sultan of Sulu. Purdue University's Ross–Ade Stadium, home of the Boilermakers football team, is named for him and fellow Purdue benefactor David Ross. Disgraced Indiana governor Warren McCray, convicted of mail fraud and forced to resign in 1924, also hailed from Kentland.

The Newton County Courthouse was listed on the National Register of Historic Places in 2008.

== Geography ==
According to the 2010 census, Kentland has a total area of 1.53 square miles (3.96 km^{2}), all land.

The Kentland crater, a probable meteorite impact crater, is located between Kentland and Goodland.

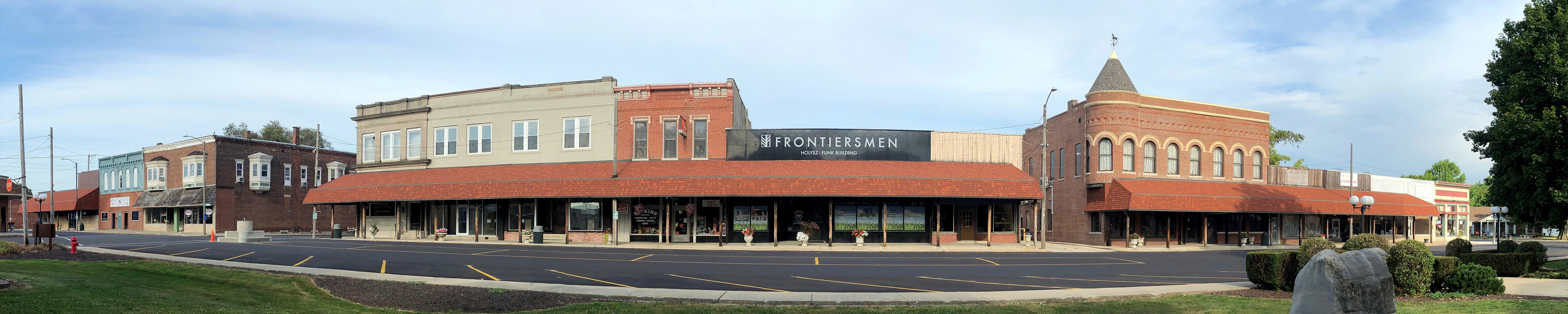
Downtown

== Demographics ==
Historical population
Census	Pop.	Note	%±
1870	802		—
1880	982		22.4%
1890	918		−6.5%
1900	1,006		9.6%
1910	1,209		20.2%
1920	1,283		6.1%
1930	1,355		5.6%
1940	1,608		18.7%
1950	1,633		1.6%
1960	1,783		9.2%
1970	1,864		4.5%
1980	1,936		3.9%
1990	1,798		−7.1%
2000	1,822		1.3%
2010	1,748		−4.1%
2020	1,641		−6.1%
U.S. Decennial Census

=== 2020 census ===
As of the 2020 census, Kentland had a population of 1,641. The median age was 43.0 years. 22.8% of residents were under the age of 18 and 20.4% of residents were 65 years of age or older. For every 100 females there were 95.6 males, and for every 100 females age 18 and over there were 90.2 males age 18 and over.

0.0% of residents lived in urban areas, while 100.0% lived in rural areas.

There were 717 households in Kentland, of which 27.3% had children under the age of 18 living in them. Of all households, 39.1% were married-couple households, 19.4% were households with a male householder and no spouse or partner present, and 31.8% were households with a female householder and no spouse or partner present. About 37.0% of all households were made up of individuals and 18.2% had someone living alone who was 65 years of age or older.

There were 783 housing units, of which 8.4% were vacant. The homeowner vacancy rate was 3.7% and the rental vacancy rate was 3.9%.

Racial composition as of the 2020 census
Race	Number	Percent
White	1,459	88.9%
Black or African American	4	0.2%
American Indian and Alaska Native	3	0.2%
Asian	7	0.4%
Native Hawaiian and Other Pacific Islander	1	0.1%
Some other race	94	5.7%
Two or more races	73	4.4%
Hispanic or Latino (of any race)	159	9.7%

=== 2010 census ===
As of the census of 2010, there were 1,748 people, 695 households, and 450 families living in the town. The population density was 1,142.5 inhabitants per square mile (441.1/km^{2}). There were 782 housing units at an average density of 511.1 per square mile (197.3/km^{2}). The racial makeup of the town was 94.2% White, 0.8% African American, 0.1% Native American, 0.5% Asian, 2.6% from other races, and 1.8% from two or more races. Hispanic or Latino of any race were 8.0% of the population.

There were 695 households, of which 30.5% had children under the age of 18 living with them, 46.9% were married couples living together, 11.9% had a female householder with no husband present, 5.9% had a male householder with no wife present, and 35.3% were non-families. 30.9% of all households were made up of individuals, and 13.4% had someone living alone who was 65 years of age or older. The average household size was 2.46 and the average family size was 3.02.

The median age in the town was 40.9 years. 24.7% of residents were under the age of 18; 7.7% were between the ages of 18 and 24; 21.4% were from 25 to 44; 30.3% were from 45 to 64; and 15.8% were 65 years of age or older. The gender makeup of the town was 49.0% male and 51.0% female.

=== 2000 census ===
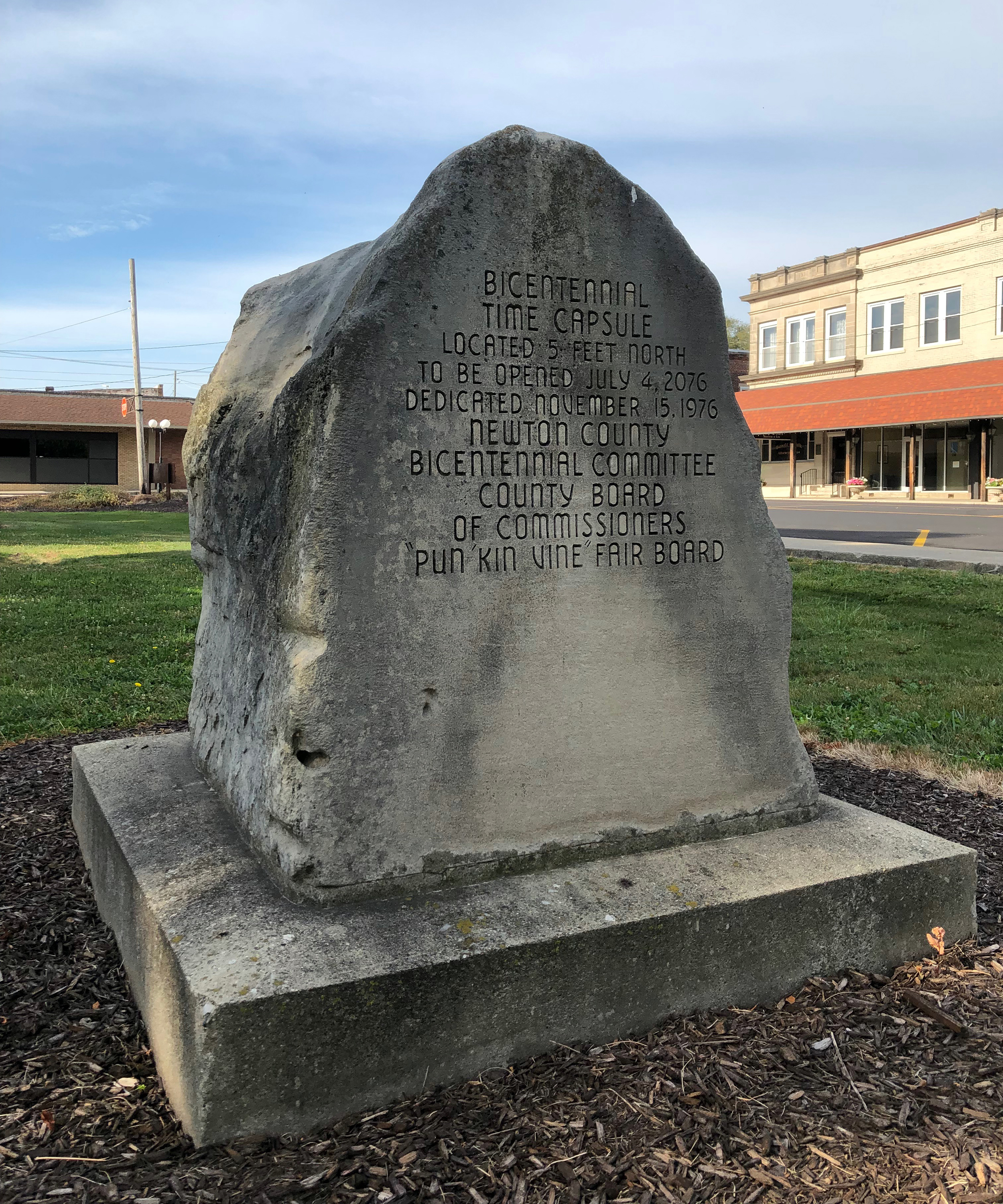
The time capsule

As of the census of 2000, there were 1,822 people, 733 households, and 477 families living in the town. The population density was 1,250.5 inhabitants per square mile (482.8/km^{2}). There were 793 housing units at an average density of 544.3 per square mile (210.2/km^{2}). The racial makeup of the town was 98.30% White, 0.11% African American, 0.27% Asian, 0.82% from other races, and 0.49% from two or more races. Hispanic or Latino of any race were 2.96% of the population.

There were 733 households, out of which 29.7% had children under the age of 18 living with them, 50.3% were married couples living together, 10.8% had a female householder with no husband present, and 34.9% were non-families. 30.4% of all households were made up of individuals, and 14.3% had someone living alone who was 65 years of age or older. The average household size was 2.42 and the average family size was 3.03.

In the town, the population was spread out, with 24.7% under the age of 18, 9.4% from 18 to 24, 27.2% from 25 to 44, 22.1% from 45 to 64, and 16.6% who were 65 years of age or older. The median age was 39 years. For every 100 females there were 96.8 males. For every 100 females age 18 and over, there were 90.3 males.

The median income for a household in the town was $34,732, and the median income for a family was $45,043. Males had a median income of $32,734 versus $20,714 for females. The per capita income for the town was $17,797. About 4.7% of families and 7.5% of the population were below the poverty line, including 5.6% of those under age 18 and 13.8% of those age 65 or over.

== Education ==
The town has a lending library, the Kentland-Jefferson Township Public Library.

== Notable people ==
- George Ade, columnist and author; Ross–Ade Stadium at Purdue University is named for him.
- Alice Chancellor, Army engineer
- Jethro A. Hatch, was the first physician in Kentland and a U.S. Representative from Indiana.
- Warren T. McCray, 30th Governor of Indiana.
- Tracy Smith, former Arizona State baseball coach.
