= Tornado outbreak of March 10–12, 2026 =

Weather event in the United States

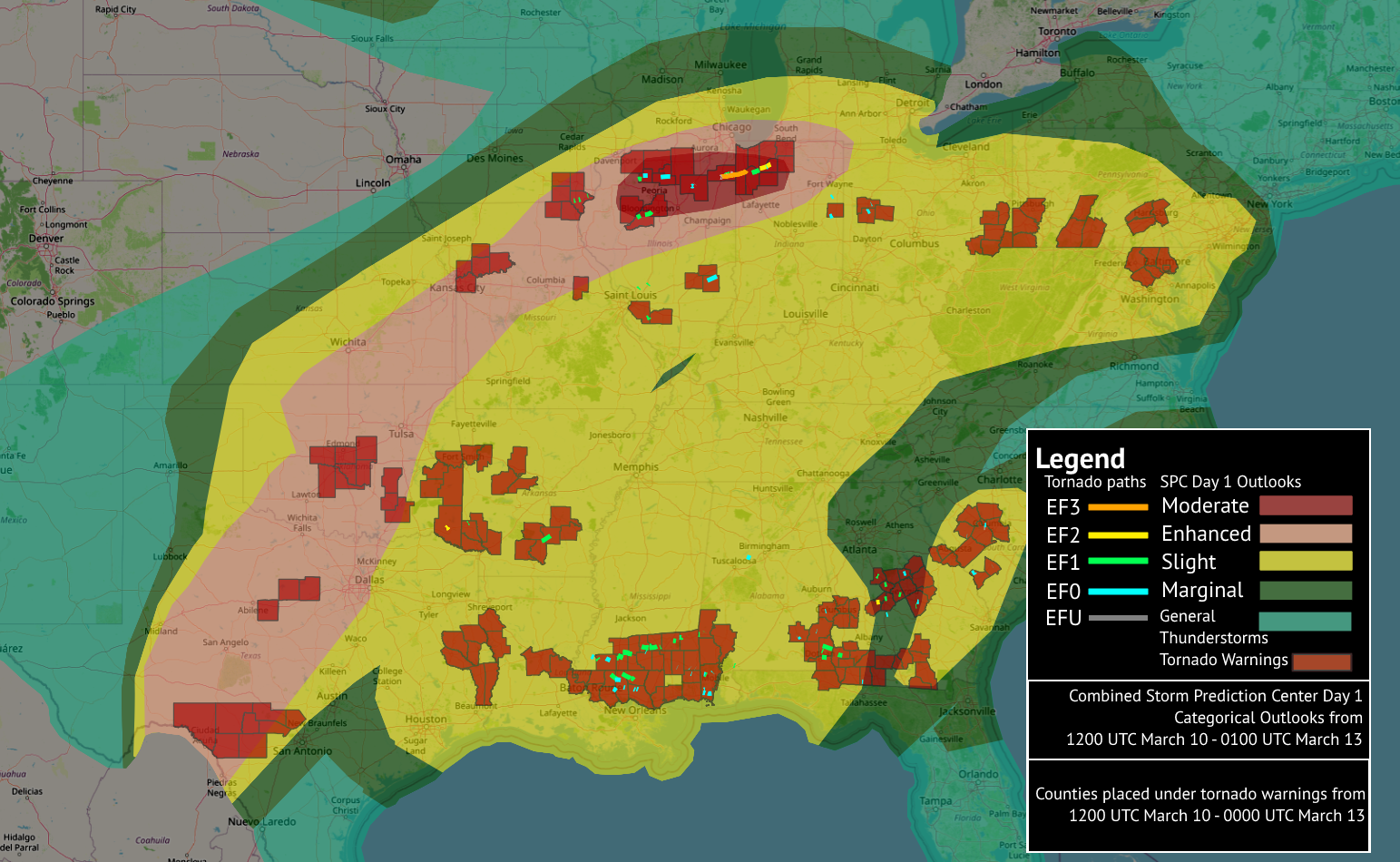
- Map of tornadoes and counties placed under tornado warnings from March 10 to March 12

Meteorological history
- Duration: March 10–12, 2026

Tornado outbreak
- Tornadoes: 106
- Max. rating: EF3 tornado
- Duration: 1 day, 20 hours, 25 minutes
- Highest winds: Tornadic – 160 mph (260 km/h) (Aroma Park, Illinois EF3 on March 10)
- Highest gusts: Non-tornadic – 90 mph (140 km/h) (near Excel, AL on March 11)
- Largest hail: 6.616 in (16.80 cm) – Kankakee, Illinois on March 10

Overall effects
- Fatalities: 3
- Injuries: 27 (+8 non-tornadic)
- Areas affected: Southern, Midwestern and Eastern United States
- Part of the Tornadoes of 2026

A large tornado outbreak took place from March 10–12, 2026 within the Midwestern United States, Southern Plains, and Southeastern United States. The Storm Prediction Center forecasted a tornado-driven moderate risk for severe weather on March 10, covering portions of central and eastern Illinois and northwestern portions of Indiana with a risk for very large hail, damaging winds, and strong to intense tornadoes.

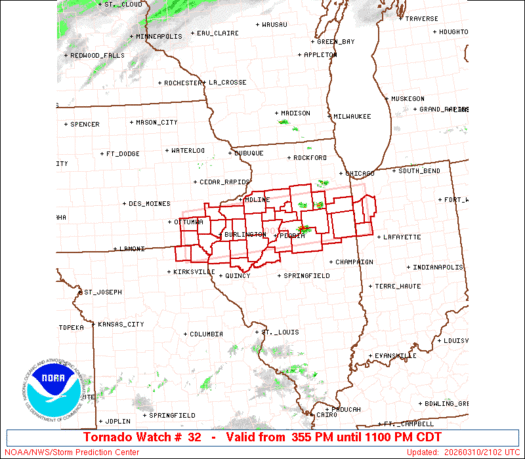
Tornado Watch Issued on March 10, 2026, For the Tornado Outbreak that Produced the Kankakee-Roselawn IL/IN EF3.

Tornado watches were issued from Texas to Indiana during the late afternoon and early evening due to the risk of severe weather. A large tornado passed through the Kankakee, Illinois suburb of Aroma Park, causing significant damage and killing one person, before crossing into Indiana and striking Lake Village, where it would kill an additional two people. Along its track, 19 others were injured. The supercell thunderstorm that spawned the tornado near Kankakee also produced potentially record breaking hail, with a storm report of a 6.14 inches (15.6 cm) in diameter hailstone occurring in the Kankakee area, which, if confirmed, would break the former Illinois state record of 4.75 inches (12.1 cm) in diameter hail. A hailstone with a diameter measured by Northern Illinois University of 6.616 inches (16.80 cm) was also discovered in Kankakee by the Dorris family, which is currently undergoing the verification process for becoming the new Illinois state hailstone size record holder. The supercell would continue producing tornadoes, including one which led to a tornado emergency being issued for Knox, Indiana. In all, the supercell produced 12 tornadoes: six rated EFU, two rated EF0, two rated EF1, one rated EF2, and one rated EF3. Three of the EFU tornadoes and one of the EF1 tornadoes were satellite tornadoes of the Aroma Park—Lake Village EF3 tornado, and one of the EF0 tornadoes was a satellite of the Knox EF2 tornado. In addition to the tornadoes, a group of hailstorms impacted parts of the Kansas City metropolitan area, producing 3.00 inches (7.6 cm) diameter hailstones in the Victory Hills neighborhood of Kansas City, Kansas, and 4.50 inches (11.4 cm) and 4.00 inches (10.2 cm) diameter hailstones near Weatherby Lake and at Lake Waukomis respectively, both in Kansas City, Missouri. Other locations where particularly large hail fell were Campus, Illinois with 5.50 inches (14.0 cm) diameter hail, the Chicago suburb of Darien, Illinois with 4.80 inches (12.2 cm) diameter hail, and near Camp Wood, Texas and Leakey, Texas, both with 4.50 inches (11.4 cm) diameter hail. All these very large hail events occurred on March 10.

In the following days, dozens of relatively weak and short-lived tornadoes occurred in the Southeastern United States, with the majority of them taking place in Mississippi, Georgia, Louisiana, and Alabama. On March 12, an EF2 tornado touched down in Macon County, Georgia, just northwest of Marshallville. The tornado tracked eastward, destroying several mobile homes and injuring two people.

== Meteorological synopsis ==
The supercell responsible for the Kankakee–Roselawn tornado and the Kankakee area's record-breaking hail.

Shortly after the tornado outbreak of March 5–7, 2026, another severe weather outbreak was forecasted for March 10th. During the morning of the outbreak, a warm front had moved into Northern Illinois, where it stalled due to a lake breeze from Lake Michigan. The environment was very favorable for severe weather across the Midwest to the central plains, with CAPE values over 3000 J/KG and moderate to strong wind shear present across the risk area. Before the 1630Z outlook, a mesoscale discussion was issued for the upgrade to a tornado-driven moderate risk. Additionally, a dryline in Texas led to a threat for large hail and severe winds.

== Confirmed tornadoes ==
Confirmed tornadoes by Enhanced Fujita rating
EFU	EF0	EF1	EF2	EF3	EF4	EF5	Total
11	40	54	3	1	0	0	109

=== March 10 event ===
List of confirmed tornadoes – Tuesday, March 10, 2026 (Note: All dates are based on the local time zone where the tornado touched down; however, all times are in Coordinated Universal Time for consistency.)
EF#	Location	County / Parish	State	Start Coord.	Time (UTC)	Path length	Max width
EF0	N of Pontiac	Livingston	IL	40.9019°N 88.6304°W	21:49–21:51	1.07 mi (1.72 km)	175 yd (160 m)
EF0	This weak tornado removed the roof of a boathouse and damaged a garage and a fence. This was the first tornado produced by the Kankakee Valley supercell.						
EFU	E of Cayuga	Livingston	IL	40.9408°N 88.5665°W	21:57–21:58	0.25 mi (0.40 km)	10 yd (9.1 m)
EFU	A law enforcement officer reported this brief tornado, which was the second one produced by the Kankakee Valley supercell. No damage was reported.						
EFU	Potosi	Taylor	TX	32.33°N 99.66°W	22:00–22:02	0.25 mi (0.40 km)	200 yd (180 m)
EFU	A brief tornado was reported by a storm chaser.						
EFU	ENE of Dudley	Callahan	TX	32.27°N 99.51°W	22:18–22:23	0.96 mi (1.54 km)	200 yd (180 m)
EFU	A tornado remained over open land causing no damage.						
EFU	E of Dudley	Callahan	TX	32.25°N 99.48°W	22:30–22:33	0.93 mi (1.50 km)	200 yd (180 m)
EFU	This tornado was documented on video by a storm chaser.						
EFU	ENE of Val Verde Park	Kinney	TX	29.36°N 100.6°W	22:40	0.01 mi (0.016 km)	10 yd (9.1 m)
EFU	This brief tornado was photographed over open country. No damage was noted.						
EFU	Southern Kankakee	Kankakee	IL	41.0821°N 87.8905°W	23:18–23:19	0.54 mi (0.87 km)	10 yd (9.1 m)
EFU	The third tornado produced by the Kankakee Valley supercell crossed over trees and powerlines but inflicted no damage.						
EFU	SSW of Kankakee	Kankakee	IL	41.0728°N 87.9063°W	23:19–23:20	0.48 mi (0.77 km)	60 yd (55 m)
EFU	Three storm chasers observed this brief tornado that caused no damage. This was fourth tornado produced by the Kankakee Valley supercell.						
EF3	Southern Kankakee, IL to Lake Village, IN to W of DeMotte, IN	Kankakee (IL), Newton (IN), Jasper (IN)	IL, IN	41.0779°N 87.8856°W	23:21–00:39	34.22 mi (55.07 km)	1,550 yd (1,420 m)
EF3	3 deaths – See section on this tornado – This was the fifth tornado produced by the Kankakee Valley supercell; 19 people were injured.						
EF1	SW of Sun River Terrace	Kankakee	IL	41.1121°N 87.7651°W	23:33–23:38	1.31 mi (2.11 km)	150 yd (140 m)
EF1	This satellite tornado to the Aroma Park EF3 tornado formed in a field, producing swirl marks as it looped twice and tracked erratically southward. As it continued, sporadic tree damage occurred north of the Kankakee River before it crossed the river, made landfall on an island where it uprooted some more trees, moved off the island, and then made landfall back onto the south shore of the river, damaging more trees. The tornado then turned due south before eventually dissipating after uprooting a few more trees. This was the sixth tornado produced by the Kankakee Valley supercell.						
EF0	NW of Tuttle	Grady	OK	41.1121°N 87.7651°W	23:36	0.2 mi (0.32 km)	30 yd (27 m)
EF0	Chicken coops were damaged.						
EFU	S of Sun River Terrace	Kankakee	IL	41.1115°N 87.7313°W	23:36–23:37	0.09 mi (0.14 km)	20 yd (18 m)
EFU	Another satellite tornado to the Aroma Park EF3 tornado produced swirl marks in an open field, but caused no damage. This was the seventh tornado produced by the Kankakee Valley supercell.						
EFU	S of Momence	Kankakee	IL	41.1085°N 87.6693°W	23:43–23:44	0.15 mi (0.24 km)	20 yd (18 m)
EFU	Storm chasers recorded this brief anticyclonic satellite tornado to the Aroma Park EF3 tornado moving over an open field. No damage occurred. This was the eighth tornado produced by the Kankakee Valley supercell.						
EFU	N of Hopkins Park	Kankakee	IL	41.1178°N 87.6203°W	23:51–23:55	1.76 mi (2.83 km)	80 yd (73 m)
EFU	Another anticyclonic satellite tornado to the Aroma Park EF3 tornado took a unique track where it initially moved erratically north-northeastward over open farmland. The tornado then stopped, did a loop, and moved westward before gradually turning southward and ending just north of a residence less than 300 yd (270 m) southwest of where it had touched down. It left swirl marks in the fields, but no damage was reported. This was the ninth tornado produced by the Kankakee Valley supercell.						
EF1	SE of Centerville to SW of Toulon	Knox, Stark	IL	41.0347°N 90.0033°W	00:22–00:29	4.96 mi (7.98 km)	100 yd (91 m)
EF1	This tornado touched down and toppled a shipping container and caused tree damage near its starting point. As it moved eastward and intensified, it snapped additional trees and damaged several homes and outbuildings. The tornado continued east and crossed IL 78, where it damaged the roof of a home, broke windows, and caused extensive siding damage before dissipating.						
EF0	NW of Toulon to S of Modena	Stark	IL	41.1°N 89.88°W	00:30–00:37	6.09 mi (9.80 km)	50 yd (46 m)
EF0	A tornado caused sporadic tree damage.						
EF1	NE of Kniman to ENE of Tefft	Jasper	IN	41.1559°N 87.1182°W	00:43–01:06	10.46 mi (16.83 km)	900 yd (820 m)
EF1	This large high-end EF1 tornado touched down four minutes after the Aroma Park EF3 tornado dissipated. It first caused damage to a solar panel field and several power poles. As it moved east-northeast, it damaged a nearby farmstead before intensifying just south of Wheatfield near SR 49, where numerous homes sustained considerable damage, and many trees and power poles were downed. Continuing east-northeast across SR 49, the tornado damaged additional solar panel fields, farmsteads, trees, and power poles as it crossed SR 10 and passed through Tefft. The tornado weakened afterward and dissipated before reaching the Jasper-Starke county line. This was the tenth tornado produced by the Kankakee Valley supercell. 3 people were injured.						
EF0	N of Sparland to SSE of Magnolia	Marshall	IL	41.0743°N 89.4281°W	01:01–01:18	12.57 mi (20.23 km)	50 yd (46 m)
EF0	This weak tornado caused tree damage on both sides of the Illinois River.						
EF2	SW of Riverside to NW of Knox	Starke	IN	41.2391°N 86.9004°W	01:07–01:43	15.52 mi (24.98 km)	1,200 yd (1,100 m)
EF2	This large and strong multi-vortex tornado, which formed five minutes after the Wheatland EF1 tornado dissipated and prompted the issuance of a tornado emergency for Knox, developed west of US 421 and moved east-northeastward. As it crossed US 421, the tornado reached its peak intensity of low-end EF2, heavily damaging two large pole barns and destroying three empty grain bins with debris carried up to 1/2 mi (0.80 km) downwind. As it continued east-northeast, it damaged trees, center pivot irrigation systems, and several additional barns and homes. The tornado then crossed SR 39 just south of Jackson, producing further damage before moving across mostly open, unplanted fields. Additional damage occurred as the tornado crossed SR 8, where more structures and trees were impacted, as the tornado continued east-northeast before lifting just southeast of the Starke County Airport. This was the eleventh tornado produced by the Kankakee Valley supercell.						
EF0	S of Jackson	Starke	IN	41.2655°N 86.7473°W	01:35–01:36	0.7 mi (1.1 km)	150 yd (140 m)
EF0	This satellite tornado to the Knox EF2 tornado was confirmed by storm chaser video after the damage assessment uncovered an unusual damage path on the south side of the main larger tornado. It partially collapsed an outbuilding and sporadically uprooted trees as it approached SR 39 before dissipating just after crossing the highway. This was the twelfth and final tornado produced by the Kankakee Valley supercell.						
EF1	SW of Donnellson	Lee	IA	40.62°N 91.63°W	02:05–02:08	1.51 mi (2.43 km)	50 yd (46 m)
EF1	This tornado downed tree branches before strengthening enough to damage the door of a farm outbuilding and additional nearby agricultural structures. As it continued east, it continued to cause intermittent tree damage. The tornado then intensified further, destroying two farm outbuildings and snapping numerous tree trunks at the point of peak strength. After this, it quickly weakened, producing lighter damage before dissipating shortly afterward.						
EF1	SSE of Franklin	Lee	IA	40.64°N 91.5°W	02:26–02:31	2.12 mi (3.41 km)	50 yd (46 m)
EF1	A tornado began by downing tree branches before causing minor structural damage to a home, including fascia damage. As it moved into Wilson Lake Park, additional trees were downed, with some uprooted and a few trunks snapped. Farther along its path, the damage became more sporadic, consisting mainly of minor tree damage until the tornado lifted.						
EF1	W of Wever	Lee	IA	40.71°N 91.29°W	02:38–02:40	1.16 mi (1.87 km)	50 yd (46 m)
EF1	This tornado damaged a home by tearing large sections of shingles from the roof and blowing in the soffit on two sides, while nearby residences sustained minor roof damage. As it continued along its path, about 10 to 15 trees were snapped and an additional five to eight trees were uprooted. A power pole was also snapped before the tornado dissipated.						
EF1	Eastern Havana to NW of Topeka	Mason	IL	40.2968°N 90.0287°W	04:52–04:58	5.57 mi (8.96 km)	200 yd (180 m)
EF1	This tornado touched down on the far eastern edge of Havana near a cemetery, where it began snapping tree trunks. As it moved northeast, additional trees were snapped and several power poles were broken before the tornado approached the area near Topeka. The most significant damage occurred there when a horse barn was partially destroyed, killing a horse, before the tornado dissipated.						

=== March 11 event ===
List of confirmed tornadoes – Wednesday, March 11, 2026
EF#	Location	County / Parish	State	Start Coord.	Time (UTC)	Path length	Max width
EF1	S of Forest City to W of Green Valley	Mason, Tazewell	IL	40.3521°N 89.826°W	05:06–05:15	10.06 mi (16.19 km)	50 yd (46 m)
EF1	This tornado caused damage to several irrigation pivots early in its path, overturning sections of the equipment and breaking branches from nearby trees. As it continued northeast, the tornado intensified, snapping eight power poles before quickly weakening and dissipating.						
EF2	ENE of Golden	McCurtain	OK	34.0403°N 94.8532°W	05:30–05:37	2.35 mi (3.78 km)	240 yd (220 m)
EF2	A strong tornado touched down and began by initially snapping trees and tearing shingles from a nearby home. As it moved east, additional trees were snapped or uprooted and a barn or shed sustained roof damage. The tornado then intensified, snapping and uprooting numerous trees before striking a residence where most exterior walls collapsed, injuring the occupant, while additional trees fell onto the structure causing further damage. Nearby properties also sustained damage to structures and trees, and another residence along the path lost portions of its roof while a neighboring barn suffered significant roof damage. Farther along, the tornado pushed a small outbuilding off its foundation and continued snapping and uprooting trees before crossing SH-3 and dissipating.						
EF1	SSE of Gilham	Sevier	AR	34.142°N 94.3061°W	06:12–06:14	0.52 mi (0.84 km)	85 yd (78 m)
EF1	This brief tornado began east of US 59, damaging several large barns and snapping or uprooting multiple trees.						
EF1	Western Grafton	Jersey	IL	38.9704°N 90.4539°W	08:24–08:25	0.13 mi (0.21 km)	100 yd (91 m)
EF1	A very brief tornado caused significant roof damage to a local restaurant. The tornado then crossed IL 100 and caused more damage to a hotel and a hotel. The tornado uprooted a small tree and broke several tree branches before dissipating.						
EF1	SE of Moro to Midway	Madison	IL	38.9113°N 89.9914°W	08:50–08:52	1.64 mi (2.64 km)	25 yd (23 m)
EF1	A high-end EF1 tornado damaged several homes, grain bins and trees. One injury occurred.						
EF1	E of Williamson to N of Binney	Madison, Macoupin	IL	38.9915°N 89.7554°W	09:08–09:13	1.61 mi (2.59 km)	10 yd (9.1 m)
EF1	This tornado struck a solar farm, causing damage in and around the farm. It also inflicted minor roof damage to a home, leaned power poles and uprooted trees.						
EF1	NW of Darmstadt to SW of St. Libory	St. Clair	IL	38.3306°N 89.7746°W	10:05–10:08	2.63 mi (4.23 km)	300 yd (270 m)
EF1	This tornado damaged multiple outbuildings and trees.						
EF0	N of Yale	Jasper	IL	39.1438°N 88.0345°W	11:10–11:12	1.7 mi (2.7 km)	50 yd (46 m)
EF0	A barn was destroyed and some tree damage occurred.						
EF0	SW of Riverside to NE of Vera Cruz	Wells	IN	40.6893°N 85.1116°W	11:35–11:38	2.59 mi (4.17 km)	30 yd (27 m)
EF0	A weak tornado touched down in an open field and moved northeast, damaging a pole barn by removing its roof and leaving its walls leaning while debris from the structure was carried downwind, striking another nearby pole barn before being scattered into a nearby yard. As the tornado continued across mostly unplanted fields, drone imagery showed a narrow area of very light ground scouring and inflow patterns in the soil. The tornado then reached SR 116, where a tree was blown down across the roadway and struck by a vehicle, before continuing northeast. Near the end of its path, a small garage was shifted off its foundation when winds impacted the garage door, and the tornado dissipated shortly afterward near the Wells-Adams county line.						
EF1	E of Thornton to ENE of Kingsland	Calhoun, Dallas, Cleveland	AR	33.7665°N 92.4404°W	11:57–12:16	14.58 mi (23.46 km)	200 yd (180 m)
EF1	A tornado touched down east of US 167 southwest of Fordyce, where it began by snapping and uprooting pine trees. As it moved northeast it crossed AR 274 and AR 205, continuing to cause extensive damage to pine and some hardwood trees while a few outbuildings were damaged and several homes sustained minor roof damage. The tornado then crossed AR 8, snapping at least three wooden power poles. Farther along, trees were blown down onto AR 97, leading to a two-vehicle accident which resulted in no injuries. The tornado continued northeast across AR 189, producing additional tree damage before dissipating near the Saline River.						
EF0	S of Redkey to NE of Powers	Jay	IN	40.3185°N 85.1515°W	13:16–13:19	3.9 mi (6.3 km)	200 yd (180 m)
EF0	This tornado touched down west of SR 1, where it crossed the highway and snapped three power poles. Along the northern edge of the path, a barn sustained door damage while nearby trees were downed and a greenhouse was damaged. As the tornado moved northeast, it caused roof damage to a home and additional tree damage across several properties. Farther along, the roof of a pole barn was damaged and debris was carried about 350 yards (320 m) to the east. Near the end of the path, two animal barns lost portions of their roofs, with metal roofing from one structure blown into an adjacent field, before the tornado dissipated.						
EF0	NW of Anna	Shelby	OH	40.41°N 84.2°W	14:17–14:20	1.9 mi (3.1 km)	60 yd (55 m)
EF0	A tornado first caused damage where two barns were destroyed. Numerous trees in the area were uprooted or snapped, and a nearby residence sustained minor roof damage. As the tornado continued east, the roof was lifted from another barn, and several more trees were uprooted. Farther along, additional trees were uprooted, and a garage was damaged before the tornado approached I-75 and dissipated shortly beforehand.						
EF0	N of Anna	Shelby	OH	40.4089°N 84.1875°W	14:18–14:22	3 mi (4.8 km)	50 yd (46 m)
EF0	This tornado began by overturning an RV and damaging siding on two nearby properties before downing a pair of trees. It then crossed I-75, where two semi-trailers were blown over. Continuing east, the tornado blew down a tree, destroyed a shed, and tore shingles from a residence and garage. After moving across a field, it destroyed a large outbuilding and scattered debris widely across the property before dissipating.						
EF0	W of Saint Johns	Auglaize	OH	40.5557°N 84.0988°W	14:22–14:23	0.57 mi (0.92 km)	40 yd (37 m)
EF0	A brief tornado inflicted heavy damaged to three outbuildings along US 33.						
EF1	S of Gaither	Howard	MD	39.3333°N 77.0004°W	23:06–23:08	0.75 mi (1.21 km)	100 yd (91 m)
EF1	Approximately fifty trees were snapped or uprooted.						
EF0	Southeastern Eldersburg	Carroll	MD	39.357°N 76.893°W	23:14–23:15	0.26 mi (0.42 km)	75 yd (69 m)
EF0	A weak tornado occurred in Patapsco Valley State Park, snapping and uprooting numerous trees.						
EF0	SW of Rosetta	Wilkinson	MS	31.31°N 91.18°W	23:55–00:01	4.1 mi (6.6 km)	100 yd (91 m)
EF0	A high-end EF0 tornado damaged numerous trees.						
EF1	S of Coles	Amite	MS	31.26°N 91.03°W	00:09–00:12	2.39 mi (3.85 km)	200 yd (180 m)
EF1	Several trees were snapped or uprooted across heavily forested areas.						
EF0	N of Liberty	Amite	MS	31.26°N 90.81°W	00:27–00:37	6.52 mi (10.49 km)	150 yd (140 m)
EF0	This weak tornado displaced and damaged numerous trees.						
EF1	WNW of McComb	Pike	MS	31.27°N 90.54°W	00:48–00:50	1.77 mi (2.85 km)	375 yd (343 m)
EF1	This high-end EF1 tornado touched down south of MS 570, where it quickly intensified while moving east-northeast, destroying a wood-frame farm outbuilding and causing increasingly heavy tree damage. Numerous trees were snapped or uprooted as the tornado strengthened, producing a broad area of significant treefall before crossing MS 570, where extensive deforestation continued for a short distance. After this point the damage quickly became less severe, with fewer trees downed as the tornado ended.						
EF1	N of Summit	Pike	MS	31.32°N 90.51°W	00:48–01:00	7.88 mi (12.68 km)	250 yd (230 m)
EF1	A tornado touched down in a wooded area where a broad swath of trees was uprooted or damaged before it moved east-southeast and crossed I-55. As the tornado strengthened and grew in size, numerous trees were snapped or uprooted along US 51 and nearby areas. Continuing east, additional tree damage occurred near the Southwest Mississippi Community College campus before the tornado destroyed a cinderblock dugout at North Pike High School. The tornado then continued eastward causing more tree damage before weakening and lifting.						
EF1	Western McComb	Pike	MS	31.27°N 90.51°W	00:51-00:53	1.37 mi (2.20 km)	175 yd (160 m)
EF1	This tornado rapidly developed along MS 570, where it uprooted several trees, snapped the tops of tree trunks, tossed a golf cart approximately 70 yards (64 m), and caused minor roof damage to a couple of homes as it tracked along the state highway. As it continued southeastward along MS 570, additional trees were snapped or uprooted, and a convergent pattern of damage was observed in a nearby residential area before the tornado dissipated.						
EF1	ESE of Norfield to NW of Jayess	Lincoln, Lawrence	MS	31.3822°N 90.388°W	00:57–01:08	10.46 mi (16.83 km)	700 yd (640 m)
EF1	This tornado caused widespread damage along its path, snapping or uprooting countless trees in some areas, damaging multiple outbuildings and utility poles, and inflicting minor to moderate damage to a mobile home and a site-built residence.						
EF1	E of Norfield to NW of Jayess	Lincoln	MS	31.4029°N 90.3806°W	00:57–01:01	8.01 mi (12.89 km)	700 yd (640 m)
EF1	This tornado caused widespread damage to trees and powerlines.						
EF1	Jayess	Lincoln, Lawrence	MS	31.369°N 90.2612°W	01:04–01:12	6.17 mi (9.93 km)	1,000 yd (910 m)
EF1	Numerous trees were uprooted or snapped in large swaths by this high-end EF1 tornado. Multiple utility poles were either snapped or leaning, along with power lines downed. Several homes and outbuildings sustained roof and siding damage, while a single business and a poultry farm also had their roofs damaged.						
EF1	W of Liverpool to WSW of Fluker	St. Helena, Tangipahoa	LA	30.91°N 90.69°W	01:17–01:33	12.15 mi (19.55 km)	200 yd (180 m)
EF1	A tornado snapped and uprooted numerous trees before lifting just before crossing I-55.						
EF0	N of Kedron to S of Chesbrough	St. Helena, Tangipahoa	LA	30.8°N 90.59°W	01:29–01:42	8.94 mi (14.39 km)	175 yd (160 m)
EF0	A weak tornado snapped tree limbs and uprooted trees.						
EF0	S of Georgeville to W of Natalbany	Livingston, Tangipahoa	LA	30.64°N 90.63°W	01:31–01:38	7.51 mi (12.09 km)	50 yd (46 m)
EF0	Numerous large tree branches were broken.						
EF1	SSW of Prentiss to Bassfield	Jefferson Davis	MS	31.5133°N 89.912°W	01:31–01:45	10.02 mi (16.13 km)	500 yd (460 m)
EF1	Several trees were snapped or uprooted, a few of which fell onto buildings and homes. Skirting was blown away from a mobile and some sheds had tin damage.						
EF1	SE of Lewiston to W of Franklinton	Tangipahoa, Washington	LA	30.93°N 90.4°W	01:38–02:02	15.29 mi (24.61 km)	200 yd (180 m)
EF1	This tornado snapped a power poles and snapped and uprooted several trees.						
EF1	SSW of Bassfield	Jefferson Davis	MS	31.4769°N 89.8074°W	01:41–01:44	3.06 mi (4.92 km)	400 yd (370 m)
EF1	A few trees were snapped with several more trees being uprooted. A few power lines were downed as well.						
EF1	S of Carson to Bassfield	Jefferson Davis	MS	31.5118°N 89.7927°W	01:41–01:44	2.9 mi (4.7 km)	250 yd (230 m)
EF1	A tornado began and moved east-southeast into Bassfield, producing damage that included numerous snapped and uprooted trees, downed power lines, and damage to a wooden building. A mobile home sustained heavy roof damage, and a vehicle was struck by a fallen tree. The tornado then weakened and dissipated shortly after crossing MS 35.						
EF0	N of Bunker Hill	Marion	MS	31.4045°N 89.8114°W	01:43–01:45	1.12 mi (1.80 km)	75 yd (69 m)
EF0	A couple of trees were uprooted before the tornado lifted just before reaching MS 35.						
EF1	E of Bassfield to SSW of Seminary	Jefferson Davis, Covington	MS	31.4896°N 89.7182°W	01:46–02:03	11.96 mi (19.25 km)	700 yd (640 m)
EF1	A tornado touched down just east of MS 42 and moved east, initially causing scattered tree damage as it progressed through rural areas. The damage intensified as the tornado continued, snapping and uprooting hundreds of trees while also causing minor damage to a few structures. After crossing into Covington County, additional trees were uprooted as the tornado tracked northeast before reaching MS 589, where a tree was uprooted and several large branches were snapped before the tornado dissipated.						
EF1	NE of Bassfield	Jefferson Davis	MS	31.5243°N 89.7029°W	01:48–01:52	3.16 mi (5.09 km)	400 yd (370 m)
EF1	A few trees were downed onto sheds. Several more trees were snapped and uprooted throughout the tornado's path.						
EF0	E of Loranger to SW of Osceola	Tangipahoa	LA	30.63°N 90.37°W	01:55–01:58	2.38 mi (3.83 km)	25 yd (23 m)
EF0	A weak tornado tracked through forested terrain, causing damage to trees.						
EF1	Southern Franklinton to NNW of Zona	Washington	LA	30.84°N 90.17°W	02:04–02:13	4.99 mi (8.03 km)	300 yd (270 m)
EF1	This tornado developed just west of Franklinton and moved southeast through the southern part of town, where it caused moderate roof damage to a floral shop and damaged a nearby business sign. As it crossed LA 16, the tornado caused minor roof damage to several homes and an apartment building while also blowing trees onto a house and a shed. Continuing southeast, the tornado produced its most intense damage after crossing south of LA 1072, where approximately forty to fifty small to medium pine trees were snapped within a forested area. Additional trees were snapped or uprooted as the tornado continued along its path before dissipating shortly afterward east of LA 1072.						
EF1	SE of Seminary	Covington	MS	31.5055°N 89.4473°W	02:10–02:11	1.09 mi (1.75 km)	400 yd (370 m)
EF1	A few trees were uprooted.						
EF0	Southern Blond	St. Tammany	LA	30.59°N 90.11°W	02:21–02:24	1.91 mi (3.07 km)	50 yd (46 m)
EF0	Tree branches were downed, rotted tree trunks were damaged and a few trees were uprooted.						
EF0	E of Blond to NNE of Waldheim	St. Tammany	LA	30.6°N 90.04°W	02:28–02:31	2.48 mi (3.99 km)	50 yd (46 m)
EF0	Minor tree damage occurred.						
EF1	SSE of Laurel	Jones	MS	31.6467°N 89.1125°W	02:33–02:39	4.22 mi (6.79 km)	400 yd (370 m)
EF1	This high-end EF1 tornado began west of MS 15, where multiple trees were snapped and uprooted before causing roof damage to two single-story homes and destroying a metal shed. As it moved east and crossed MS 15, it damaged a gas storage tank, destroyed another metal shed, and continued snapping and uprooting trees along its path. Farther east, additional trees were snapped and uprooted in rural areas before the tornado weakened and dissipated.						
EF1	SE of Sandersville to SSW of Eucutta	Jones, Wayne	MS	31.7185°N 88.9533°W	02:47–02:50	1.64 mi (2.64 km)	150 yd (140 m)
EF1	High-resolution satellite imagery showed a tornado track that caused damage to several trees.						
EF1	SSW of Eucutta (1st tornado)	Wayne	MS	31.7103°N 88.9227°W	02:50–02:52	1.38 mi (2.22 km)	250 yd (230 m)
EF1	A high-end EF1 tornado began north of US 84 within Pleasant Grove, where several trees were uprooted around a pond. As it moved east, it continued snapping and uprooting trees before merging with the other 0250 UTC tornado, producing a broader swath of significant tree damage where numerous trees were snapped and uprooted across a wide area. The tornado then continued northeast as the dominant circulation and struck several chicken farms, tearing away large sections of roof paneling from the buildings. After impacting the farm structures, the tornado weakened and lifted shortly afterward, with no additional damage observed beyond that point.						
EF1	SSW of Eucutta (2nd tornado)	Wayne	MS	31.7042°N 88.9176°W	02:50–02:51	0.94 mi (1.51 km)	50 yd (46 m)
EF1	This tornado began just north of US 84, initially causing sporadic minor tree damage before strengthening and producing more concentrated areas of snapped and uprooted trees. As it tracked northeast, a clearer damage corridor developed with more significant tree damage visible across wooded areas. The tornado then continued northeast and merged with the previous 0250 UTC tornado, with the track likely ending shortly after the merger as the combined continued on.						
EF1	SE of Matherville, MS	Choctaw	AL	31.779°N 88.4662°W	03:28–03:30	1.47 mi (2.37 km)	320 yd (290 m)
EF1	This tornado began south of US 84 near Isney, where it uprooted and snapped several trees as it moved across a rural area. As the tornado continued, it strengthened and reached peak intensity, snapping numerous softwood trees, uprooting additional trees, and damaging several buildings at a nearby chicken farm. The tornado then began to weaken as it moved back toward US 84, producing additional tree damage before crossing the highway and lifting.						
EF0	NNE of Janice	Perry	MS	31.0698°N 89.0115°W	03:32–03:33	0.36 mi (0.58 km)	150 yd (140 m)
EF0	A brief tornado caused minor tree damage in forested areas.						
EF1	SSW of Gilbertown	Choctaw	AL	31.8192°N 88.3473°W	03:38–03:39	0.12 mi (0.19 km)	30 yd (27 m)
EF1	An outbuilding was destroyed and several trees were snapped or uprooted.						
EF1	S of Gilbertown	Choctaw	AL	31.8276°N 88.3143°W	03:42–03:43	0.16 mi (0.26 km)	35 yd (32 m)
EF1	This very brief tornado crossed SR 17, uprooting and snapping trees.						
EF0	NNE of Merrill	Greene	MS	31.0582°N 88.6847°W	04:08–04:09	0.22 mi (0.35 km)	30 yd (27 m)
EF0	A weak tornado snapped some branches and uprooted a few trees within a forest.						
EF0	SSE of Bexley to W of Lucedale	George	MS	30.9314°N 88.658°W	04:17–04:18	0.86 mi (1.38 km)	30 yd (27 m)
EF0	This tornado remained entirely within forested terrain, damaging numerous trees.						
EF0	E of Vernal	Greene	MS	31.0446°N 88.5574°W	04:23–04:24	0.22 mi (0.35 km)	30 yd (27 m)
EF0	A weak tornado snapped a few large tree branches and uprooted a tree as it crossed MS 63.						
EF0	N of Wilmer to W of Chunchula	Mobile	AL	30.9222°N 88.3352°W	04:49–04:53	2.39 mi (3.85 km)	30 yd (27 m)
EF0	This high-end EF0 tornado uprooted a tree and snapped several tree branches.						
EF1	WSW of Chunchula	Mobile	AL	30.9124°N 88.2944°W	04:53–04:56	1.55 mi (2.49 km)	110 yd (100 m)
EF1	Multiple trees were snapped or uprooted.						

=== March 12 event ===
List of confirmed tornadoes – Thursday, March 12, 2026
EF#	Location	County / Parish	State	Start Coord.	Time (UTC)	Path length	Max width
EF0	ENE of Chunchula	Mobile	AL	30.9519°N 88.1139°W	05:07–05:08	0.51 mi (0.82 km)	100 yd (91 m)
EF0	Minor tree damage occurred.						
EF0	W of Tillmans Corner	Mobile	AL	30.5806°N 88.3309°W	05:20–05:22	1.11 mi (1.79 km)	200 yd (180 m)
EF0	This weak tornado caused only tree damage.						
EF0	N of Grand Bay	Mobile	AL	30.5146°N 88.3587°W	05:24–05:25	3.34 mi (5.38 km)	140 yd (130 m)
EF0	A high-end EF0 tornado tracked north of I-10, inflicting damage only to trees.						
EF0	Irvington to S of Mobile	Mobile	AL	30.5044°N 88.2365°W	05:36–05:47	5.92 mi (9.53 km)	50 yd (46 m)
EF0	This weak tornado caused sporadic damage to trees along its entire track.						
EF1	NW of Atmore	Escambia	AL	31.1065°N 87.5664°W	05:53–05:55	0.62 mi (1.00 km)	80 yd (73 m)
EF1	This brief tornado touched down on the Poarch Creek Indian Reservation in a field near a gym, where it ripped apart a scoreboard, throwing the heavier half about 200 yards (180 m) while the lighter half was carried roughly 500 yards (460 m) into another nearby field. The tornado then struck the gym, lifting a significant portion of roofing from the west side while snapping a short power pole and depositing much of the roofing material into nearby netting. The tornado tracked east-southeast, snapping numerous small trees and knocking over several road signs. The tornado then weakened as it continued eastward, causing minor roofing and siding damage to buildings before uprooting a large oak tree and dissipating.						
EF0	S of Troy	Pike	AL	31.7057°N 85.9604°W	08:03–08:04	0.28 mi (0.45 km)	100 yd (91 m)
EF0	A very brief high-end EF0 tornado struck a housing area north of Spring Hill, where several duplex buildings sustained significant roof damage and insulation from one structure was splattered against an exterior wall. As the tornado crossed SR 87, additional duplexes sustained minor roof damage and a couple of trees were uprooted before the tornado dissipated.						
EF0	SW of Clayton	Barbour	AL	31.8484°N 85.4824°W	08:36–08:37	0.53 mi (0.85 km)	150 yd (140 m)
EF0	A tornado touched down and immediately damaged the roof of a metal outbuilding. It then crossed a nearby road and snapped or uprooted multiple trees. A nearby house lost several shingles and had most of the windows blown out on its front side along with trees on the home's property being snapped or uprooted. The tornado then weakened as it continued into an open field, where several large branches were broken along a tree line before the tornado lifted.						
EF0	ENE of Hatchechubbee	Russell	AL	32.2769°N 85.2635°W	08:46–08:48	1.53 mi (2.46 km)	100 yd (91 m)
EF0	Several trees were uprooted and some large tree branches were snapped.						
EF1	SW of Abbeville	Henry	AL	31.5338°N 85.327°W	09:07–09:09	1.39 mi (2.24 km)	200 yd (180 m)
EF1	An outbuilding was overturned, the roof of a mobile home was significantly damaged, another mobile home was shifted off its base and a large swath of trees were snapped or uprooted.						
EF1	Newville	Henry	AL	31.4263°N 85.347°W	09:09–09:17	1.97 mi (3.17 km)	387 yd (354 m)
EF1	A tornado touched down northwest of Newville and damaged the roof of a two-story business before moving through downtown Newville, where numerous trees were snapped or uprooted and several businesses sustained roof damage near the Seaboard Coast Line Railroad tracks. As it continued eastward through the town, additional trees were snapped before the tornado weakened and dissipated near US 431.						
EF1	Kinsey to S of Pleasant Plains	Houston	AL	31.2924°N 85.3462°W	09:18–09:28	7.1 mi (11.4 km)	200 yd (180 m)
EF1	This high-end EF1 tornado touched down in Kinsey, where a home sustained minor shingle damage. As it moved east, the tornado tore the roof off a small shed and snapped a nearby tree. Continuing into a nearby residential area, it strengthened, snapping and uprooting several trees. Near peak strength, the tornado lifted an outbuilding from its moorings and tossed it into a tree. The tornado then weakened, damaging an awning and later snapping the support posts of a large outbuilding, including repurposed telephone poles, which allowed the structure to shift several feet and topple a concrete structure inside before the tornado dissipated.						
EF1	S of Blakely to NE of Cuba	Early	GA	31.3453°N 84.9358°W	09:43–09:48	6.41 mi (10.32 km)	50 yd (46 m)
EF1	A tornado touched down and initially caused damage to oak and pine trees before flipping a storage shed and damaging a well-constructed farm equipment shelter. As it continued east-southeast, it severely damaged the roof of a business building that housed several large trucks when overhead doors failed and allowed the roof and part of the wall structure to be lifted and flipped over the rest of the building. Farther along the path the tornado produced scattered tree damage and then damaged the porch of a manufactured home while debris struck another nearby manufactured home. After another brief stretch of lighter damage, the tornado caused more notable tree damage in a wooded area before eventually dissipating.						
EF1	Forsyth	Monroe	GA	33.0295°N 83.9439°W	10:20–10:23	1.42 mi (2.29 km)	300 yd (270 m)
EF1	A tornado began in a neighborhood where two large trees were uprooted, bringing down power lines and causing outages, then continued east-southeast snapping and uprooting additional trees in nearby yards. As it approached SR 42, more trees were damaged and large branches were snapped before the tornado intensified and moved between residential areas and an orchard, where about ten pecan trees were uprooted and several others were snapped. Continuing southeast, the tornado uprooted or snapped additional trees throughout nearby neighborhoods, including several large trees in residential yards, while narrowly missing Mary Persons High School. The tornado then caused a few more instances of tree damage before entering a wooded area and dissipating.						
EF2	WNW of Marshallville to S of Fort Valley	Macon	GA	32.4638°N 83.9654°W	10:40–10:45	4.81 mi (7.74 km)	600 yd (550 m)
EF2	This strong tornado first touched down west of a pecan orchard, where numerous trees were snapped and uprooted as it moved through the grove. As it intensified approaching a nearby mobile home community, it destroyed four mobile homes, overturned another, and damaged several others while snapping many surrounding trees. One resident was thrown about 40 feet (12 m) from a destroyed home and two others were injured when another home was flipped and destroyed. The tornado then continued east toward SR 49, snapping and uprooting additional trees and ripping the tops off two large silos, scattering bricks and debris around the area. After crossing SR 49, the tornado continued through another pecan orchard where more trees were snapped or uprooted and three sections of a center pivot irrigation system were flipped. Farther east the tornado began to weaken, producing mainly sporadic tree damage before lifting.						
EF1	W of Macon	Bibb	GA	32.8469°N 83.7641°W	10:46–10:50	3.39 mi (5.46 km)	200 yd (180 m)
EF1	This tornado developed just west of SR 74 where several trees were snapped and uprooted before it crossed SR 74 and moved into a nearby neighborhood, damaging numerous homes with broken windows, blown-in garage doors, partial roof loss, and large sections of shingles removed. Continuing east, the tornado snapped and uprooted additional trees and knocked over a large electrical transmission pole after a falling tree struck it. The tornado then crossed I-475 and moved into a wooded area where more trees were snapped and uprooted as it continued east-northeast. The tornado then weakened and lifted as it approached another residential area.						
EF1	WSW of Warner Robins	Peach, Houston	GA	32.5394°N 83.756°W	10:56–11:00	3.28 mi (5.28 km)	350 yd (320 m)
EF1	A tornado first touched down south of SR 96, snapping and uprooting trees before moving into a nearby residential area where several homes were damaged by falling trees, and one home had its garage door blown in along with siding and shingle damage. The tornado then moved east and crossed I-75, continuing to snap and uproot trees before damaging several metal buildings just east of the interstate as it tracked east-northeast across SR 96. Along the state route, numerous power poles were snapped on the south side while many trees were snapped or uprooted on the north side, and several nearby structures sustained roof damage, broken windows, and blown-in doors. The tornado continued east along SR 96, causing additional tree damage before weakening and dissipating.						
EF0	ENE of Pinehurst to SE of Unadilla	Dooly	GA	32.2018°N 83.7166°W	11:00–11:04	2.41 mi (3.88 km)	100 yd (91 m)
EF0	A small house had sections of its metal roof blown off and a center irrigation pivot was flipped.						
EF0	NNE of Calvary to SSW of Reno	Grady	GA	30.7556°N 84.3326°W	11:03–11:05	1.78 mi (2.86 km)	300 yd (270 m)
EF0	This tornado touched down just southeast of SR 111, downing and uprooting a couple of trees before quickly dissipating.						
EF0	Milledgeville	Baldwin	GA	33.0748°N 83.2794°W	11:25–11:28	3.56 mi (5.73 km)	100 yd (91 m)
EF0	A tornado developed just west of Milledgeville and initially downed several trees, including one that fell onto a vehicle. As it moved east, additional trees were blown down in a wooded area between a local elementary school and nearby athletic fields. The tornado then crossed US 441, where it damaged a canopy at a city public works building before continuing into Milledgeville and downing more trees, including one that fell onto a house. The tornado quickly weakened and dissipated before reaching the Oconee River.						
EF1	SE of Marion to S of Jeffersonville	Twiggs	GA	32.6384°N 83.3977°W	11:25–11:29	3.24 mi (5.21 km)	400 yd (370 m)
EF1	Numerous trees were snapped or uprooted.						
EF1	E of Rentz	Laurens	GA	32.3848°N 82.9689°W	12:00–12:02	0.83 mi (1.34 km)	250 yd (230 m)
EF1	A tornado first caused damage where a pine tree was knocked over into a roadway before it moved northeast and produced minor roof shingle damage to a home and broke large tree branches nearby. As it continued, the tornado snapped or uprooted around ten pine trees before striking a residence, pushing walls outward, pulling a wall loose from its nails, and throwing debris and cinderblocks more than 50 feet (15 m) while also uprooting a hardwood tree. A large chicken coop was destroyed and displaced about 30 feet (9.1 m) as the tornado moved through the property. The tornado then continued northeast across a field, damaging additional tree limbs and uprooting another tree near a reservoir before lifting.						
EF0	S of Dublin	Laurens	GA	32.4819°N 82.9358°W	12:01–12:04	2.57 mi (4.14 km)	350 yd (320 m)
EF0	A metal road sign was bent and numerous trees were either snapped or uprooted.						
EF0	NNW of Ridge Spring	Saluda	SC	33.8674°N 81.6782°W	13:18–13:19	0.45 mi (0.72 km)	100 yd (91 m)
EF0	A small suffered partial loss of its metal roofing and multiple trees were uprooted.						
EF0	NW of Martin	Allendale	SC	33.0837°N 81.5414°W	13:44–13:48	3.72 mi (5.99 km)	30 yd (27 m)
EF0	This weak tornado first caused damage near a church, where a few trees were uprooted before it moved northeast across a large field. As it reached another rural property, a well-built outbuilding had its roof torn off and several large pine trees nearby were snapped or uprooted. Continuing toward SC 125, the tornado struck a family farm, peeling tin roofing from four to five pole barns and garages while additional trees were damaged in the area. The tornado then reached a nearby residence where two very large trees were uprooted in the front yard and more tree damage occurred behind the home. The damage path ended shortly afterward in a wooded area where numerous hardwood trees were snapped or uprooted before the tornado dissipated.						
EF0	Northern Irmo	Richland	SC	34.1041°N 81.2263°W	13:52–13:54	2.22 mi (3.57 km)	100 yd (91 m)
EF0	A tornado produced minor damage as it moved east through residential areas, snapping tree limbs and causing siding and shingle loss on several homes. Continuing along its path, additional trees were damaged and more residences sustained similar minor roof and siding damage. The tornado maintained this pattern of scattered tree damage and light structural impacts through nearby neighborhoods before dissipating a park.						
EFU	SW of Irmo	Lexington	SC	34.05°N 81.23°W	13:53–13:55	0.54 mi (0.87 km)	25 yd (23 m)
EFU	A waterspout on Lake Murray made landfall and caused no damage.						
EF0	S of Bamberg	Bamberg	SC	33.2372°N 81.0308°W	14:24–14:25	0.21 mi (0.34 km)	25 yd (23 m)
EF0	One large pine tree was snapped and multiple other trees were downed.						
EF0	Western Jacksonville	Onslow	NC	34.7469°N 77.4518°W	18:16–18:17	0.14 mi (0.23 km)	20 yd (18 m)
EF0	This brief tornado caused damage to the roof and door of an American Legion building.						
EF1	W of Maysville	Onslow	NC	34.903°N 77.2713°W	18:26–18:27	0.26 mi (0.42 km)	50 yd (46 m)
EF1	A tornado touched down near a farm where it heavily damaged a farm building, tearing away much of the roof, collapsing and removing barn doors, and peeling off siding while debris was blown into a nearby field, including a 2×4 that was driven into the ground. As the tornado continued along its path, it damaged a row of trees with several snapped in half before the tornado weakened and dissipated.						
EF1	Fairfield Harbour	Craven	NC	35.0661°N 76.9675°W	18:45–18:47	0.6 mi (0.97 km)	150 yd (140 m)
EF1	This tornado began along the shoreline of the Neuse River, where a large section of a well-built roof was torn away and thrown more than 100 yards (91 m) to the east-southeast while a nearby pine tree was snapped at its base and minor siding and trim damage occurred on nearby buildings. As it continued east, the tornado snapped a large pine tree roughly 30 feet (9.1 m) above the ground and uprooted several smaller trees while also removing shingles and causing minor siding damage to nearby homes. The tornado then moved through the surrounding neighborhood producing sporadic damage that mainly consisted of snapped trees and scattered loss of roofing shingles, with occasional minor siding damage, before the tornado weakened and dissipated shortly afterward.						
EF1	S of Vandemere	Pamlico	NC	35.1411°N 76.6629°W	18:56–19:06	1.57 mi (2.53 km)	150 yd (140 m)
EF1	This tornado began near the Bay River where several pine trees were snapped or uprooted and multiple small campers were overturned, with some trees partially debarked. As it moved east, additional clusters of trees were snapped or uprooted and a clear convergent damage pattern was observed through wooded areas. Continuing along its path, the tornado damaged three power poles by breaking their crossarms while snapping and uprooting more trees nearby. Farther along, the tornado caused significant damage to a residence when a brick exterior wall was blown inward and a sun porch was heavily damaged, injuring an occupant inside, while several additional trees were snapped in the surrounding area. The tornado then continued into a nearby field where minor siding and trim damage was noted on another home before the tornado dissipated shortly afterward.						
EF1	NE of Oriental	Pamlico	NC	35.0979°N 76.6124°W	19:03–19:05	0.32 mi (0.51 km)	150 yd (140 m)
EF1	A tornado began east of Whortonsville in a wooded area, where several trees were snapped or uprooted. As it moved east, it struck a residence where a large porch and a small portion of the roof were torn off and thrown roughly 60 yards (55 m), while nearby large pine trees were snapped or uprooted and minor siding damage occurred on the opposite sides of homes. The tornado then continued eastward, snapping additional trees before the tornado moved over inaccessible terrain where it likely dissipated.						

=== Kankakee–Aroma Park, Illinois/Lake Village–Roselawn, Indiana ===
Kankakee–Aroma Park, Illinois/Lake Village–Roselawn, Indiana
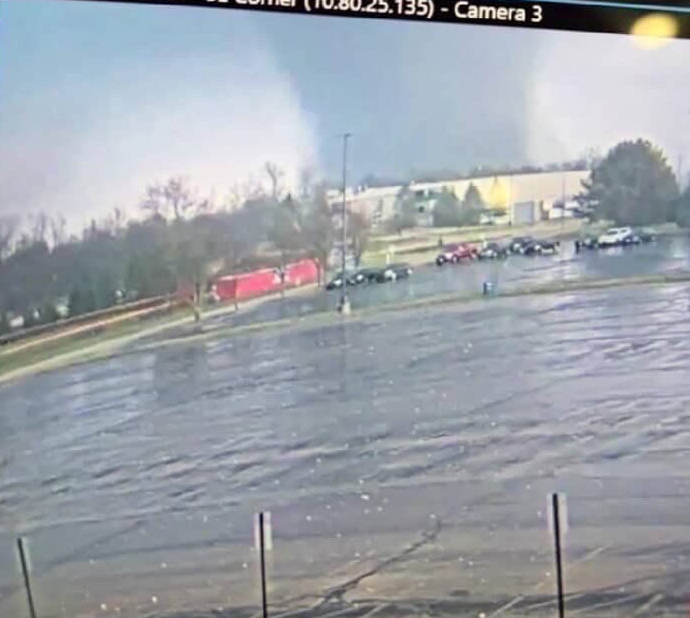
- The tornado, as seen from Kankakee Community College

Meteorological history
- Formed: March 10, 2026, 7:21 p.m. CDT (UTC–05:00)
- Dissipated: March 10, 2026, 8:39 p.m. CDT (UTC–05:00)
- Duration: 1 hour, 18 minutes

EF3 tornado
- on the Enhanced Fujita scale
- Highest winds: 160 mph (260 km/h)

Satellite tornadoes
- Tornadoes: 4
- Max. rating: EF1 tornado

Overall effects
- Fatalities: 3
- Injuries: 19

EFU	EF0	EF1	EF2	EF3	EF4	EF5	Total
3	0	1	0	1	0	0	5

This large, long-lived, and destructive tornado first touched down in Kankakee County, just east of South 1000 West Road, and moved east-northeastward, damaging a solar farm and a warehouse at high-end EF0 strength as it crossed CN Railway's Chicago Subdivision. It then intensified to EF1 strength as it entered the far southern portions of Kankakee, causing damage to numerous trees, businesses, homes, and various other structures. An Aldi location had its south-facing windows shattered, and a large metal building had roof and wall panels peeled away. The tornado then crossed US 45/US 52 before entering more residential areas, with a home along Seedorf School Road being completely destroyed when the tornado abruptly strengthened and briefly reached EF3 intensity, along with several outbuildings. Several large trees were damaged and uprooted in the area. The tornado then weakened and crossed just north of the East 2500S Road/South 500E Road intersection, tracking over empty farmland and inflicting EF0 damage to the roof of a home before crossing I-57. The tornado then began to grow larger and reintensified, inflicting EF1 damage to several homes along the western shore of the Kankakee River before crossing the body of water, tracking into northern portions of Aroma Park. Numerous homes along the eastern shore of the Kankakee River suffered EF1-rated damage, along with uprooted trees and a destroyed outbuilding. A 65-year-old man in the area was killed after his home, which was along Oakwood Drive, suffered damage.

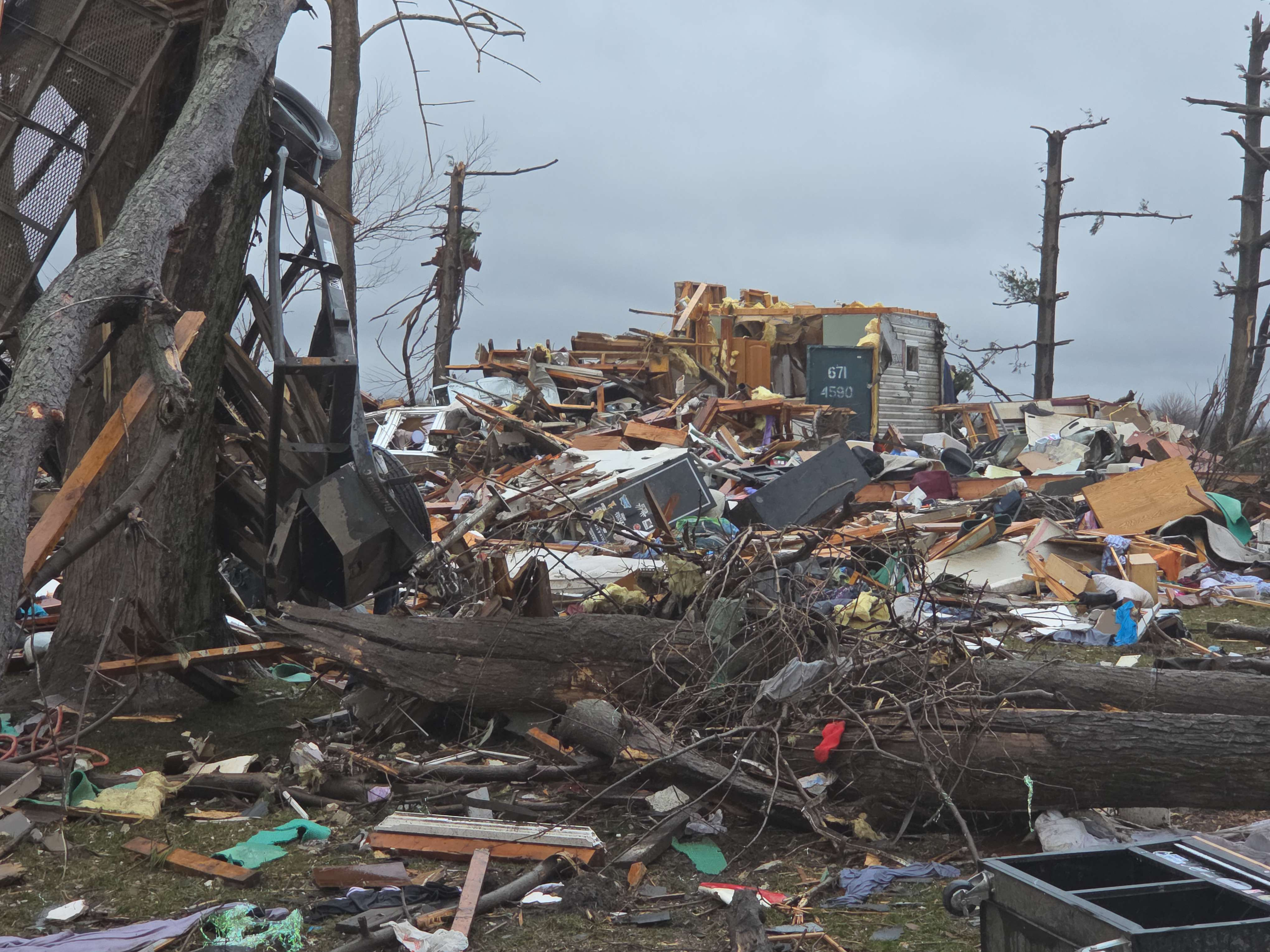
High-end EF3 damage to a home along South Sandbar Road, with a trailer wrapped around a tree in the foreground

The now-large tornado then intensified further as it crossed Waldron Road, where power poles were snapped, and a nearby home and garage suffered extensive EF2 damage, with the garage having the entire roof torn away and the house having around half of its roof ripped off. The tornado then turned southeastward and tracked further into the suburb, damaging numerous homes, including several that suffered significant EF2 damage. The tornado then crossed the KBSR's Kankakee Line before exiting Aroma Park, tracking over a large expanse of empty land at EF0 strength as it turned eastward and approached the Kankakee River for a second time. The tornado rapidly strengthened again and reached its peak intensity of high-end EF3 as it turned back to the northeast and crossed South Sandbar Road along the western side of the river, where two homes were completely destroyed, and several others suffered severe damage. One two-story home had most of its upper floor removed; the lower floor suffered the collapse of at least one exterior wall, and a nearby garage was obliterated, with debris blown across the road. Another home that was on a foundation made of cinder blocks was entirely demolished. Numerous hardwood trees in the area were significantly damaged, with some being completely uprooted or stubbed. A large pickup truck was displaced over 100 feet (30 m), and an SUV was rolled. The tornado then crossed the Kankakee River once more before snapping trees at EF2 strength as it tracked over a golf course. Two satellite tornadoes, one rated EF1 and the other rated EFU, were spawned by the parent supercell to the north of this tornado near Sun River Terrace during this time as well. The tornado then narrowed and tracked erratically east-northeastward through less populated areas as it crossed IL 1 and passed north of Wichert and Hopkins Park, inflicting scattered EF0-EF1 damage to homes, trees, and powerlines while the parent supercell spawned two more EFU satellite tornadoes to the north of this tornado as well. The tornado tracked over North 700 West Road into Newton County, Indiana and began to approach Lake Village from the west. The tornado then reintensified as it turned east-southeastward and crossed North 650 West Road, where it destroyed several farm outbuildings and significantly damaged a mobile home at EF2 intensity. The tornado then intensified further as it crossed North 600 West Road where three mobile homes were swept clean off their foundations with two of them earning low-end EF3 ratings; two elderly individuals were killed in the northernmost home. A large van was thrown into an area of displaced debris, two nearby outbuildings were destroyed, and trees were heavily damaged with some being debarked. An additional mobile home suffered EF1 damage, with the entire roof being torn away. The tornado continued to move eastward, inflicting EF1 damage to homes and trees and completely demolishing an outbuilding at low-end EF2 strength.

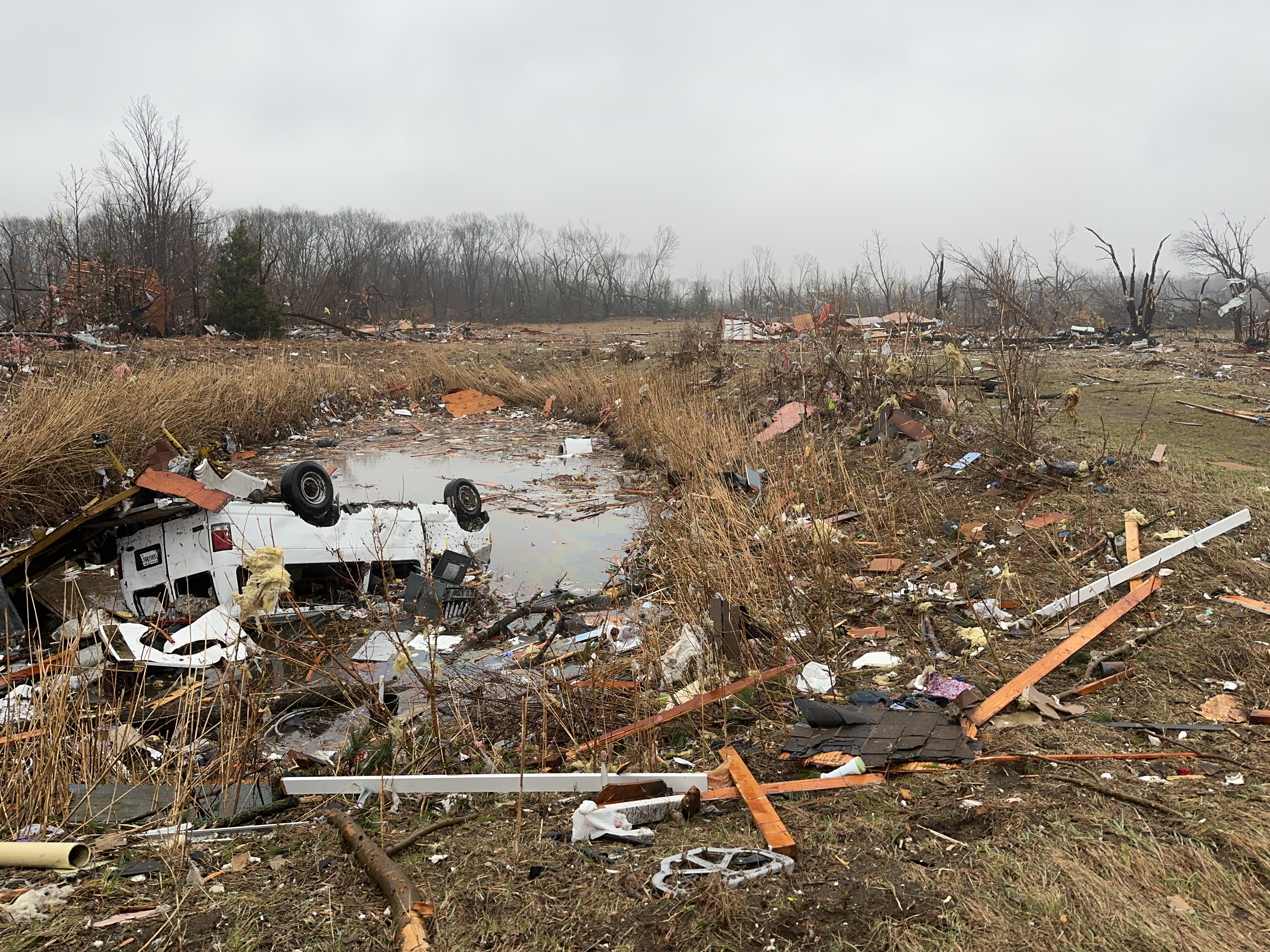
A large van that was thrown into a pond, along with the debris of destroyed homes

The tornado crossed US 41 before impacting the southern parts of Lake Village. It damaged the walls and roofs of several homes at EF2 intensity, including a single-story triplex that suffered high-end EF2 damage, with the roof being torn away and several walls collapsing. Kentland Bank had its drive-through canopy destroyed and numerous shingles removed, with several large trees suffering limb loss nearby. A Family Dollar had its entire roof removed, with the front of the building partially collapsing. The tornado then turned to the east-northeast, destroying an outbuilding at EF2 strength and damaging several homes at EF0–EF1 intensity as it approached and then crossed SR 10. The tornado then continued erratically in an east-northeastward motion, damaging trees, outbuildings, and power poles as it crossed SR 55 south of Thayer while approaching Roselawn, turning sharper to the northeast and narrowing just before striking the community, just missing it. The tornado then crossed I-65 and entered Jasper County causing EF1 damage as it struck Forest City, before dissipating just northeast of the community along North 1100 West Road.

The tornado traveled 34.22 miles (55.07 km) and reached a maximum width of 1,550 yards (1,420 m). In Kankakee County, nearly 500 buildings sustained damage, with 30 homes being completely destroyed. In Newton County near Lake Village, around 106 buildings were damaged, 32 of which were destroyed. Illinois Governor JB Pritzker visited impacted areas in Aroma Park, and Indiana Governor Mike Braun toured damage in Lake Village.

== Non-tornadic effects ==
The storm brought snowfall to portions of the Washington metropolitan area, peaking at 1.2 inches (3.0 cm) in Montgomery County, Maryland. This was just 24 hours after temperatures reached 80 °F (27 °C) or more. The strongest straight-line winds estimated were from a downburst in the Excel, Alabama area on March 11, with winds gusting to a maximum of 90 miles per hour (140 km/h). Other notable peak gusts were an estimated 75–85 miles per hour (121–137 km/h) gust near Bassfield, Mississippi on March 11, a directly measured 79 miles per hour (127 km/h) wind gust near Iconium, Missouri on March 11, an estimated 80–85 miles per hour (129–137 km/h) gust in Garnett, Kansas on March 10, and a directly measured 77 miles per hour (124 km/h) wind gust near Bucklin, Missouri on March 10.

Straight-line winds also caused multiple injuries during the outbreak, including one injury near Bethalto, Illinois on March 10, two injuries near Ashton, Georgia on March 11, two injuries (one critical) after a tree fell onto people near Topeka, Mississippi on March 11, two injuries in the Upper Sandusky, Ohio area on March 11, and one injury near Bayboro, North Carolina on March 12. Despite the widespread very severe hail falling in populated areas, no serious injuries from hail was reported.

== Aftermath ==
The tornadoes during this outbreak killed a total of 3 people, and injured at least 17 others. The straight-line winds injured at least 8 people, including 1 critically so. The 6.14 inches (15.6 cm) diameter hailstones which fell in Kankakee, IL became the largest hailstone to fall in the state of Illinois, and was certified on September 1, 2026, by the State Climate Extremes Committee.

== See also ==
- Weather of 2026
- List of North American tornadoes and tornado outbreaks
