= Walker Township, Jasper County, Indiana =

Walker Township
- Township
- Location in Jasper County
- Coordinates: 41°08′12″N 87°03′18″W
- Country: United States
- State: Indiana
- County: Jasper

Government
  - Type: Indiana township

Area
  - Total: 58.45 sq mi (151.4 km^{2})
  - Land: 58.09 sq mi (150.5 km^{2})
  - Water: 0.37 sq mi (0.96 km^{2}) 0.63%
- Elevation: 692 ft (211 m)

Population (2020)
  - Total: 3,692
  - Density: 63.1/sq mi (24.4/km^{2})
- GNIS feature ID: 0453968

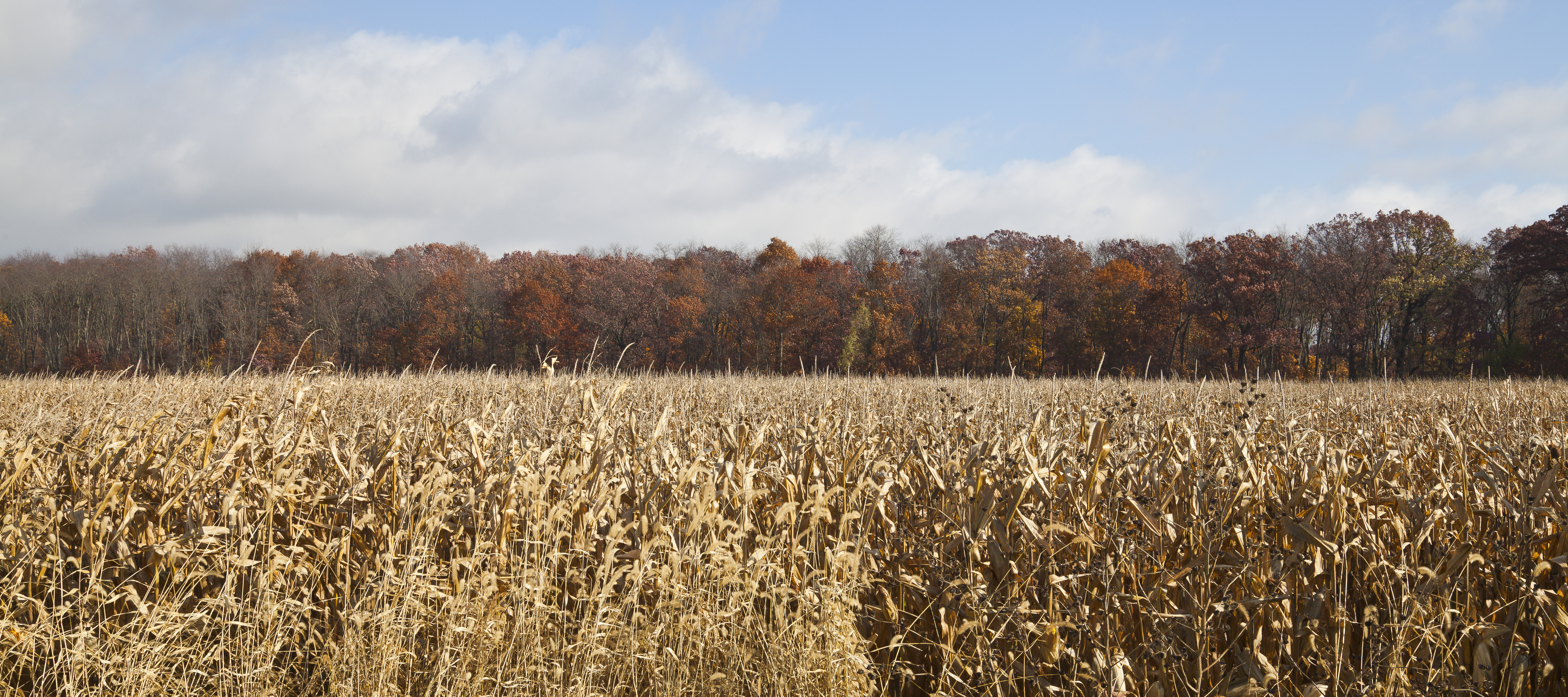
Cornfield in Walker.

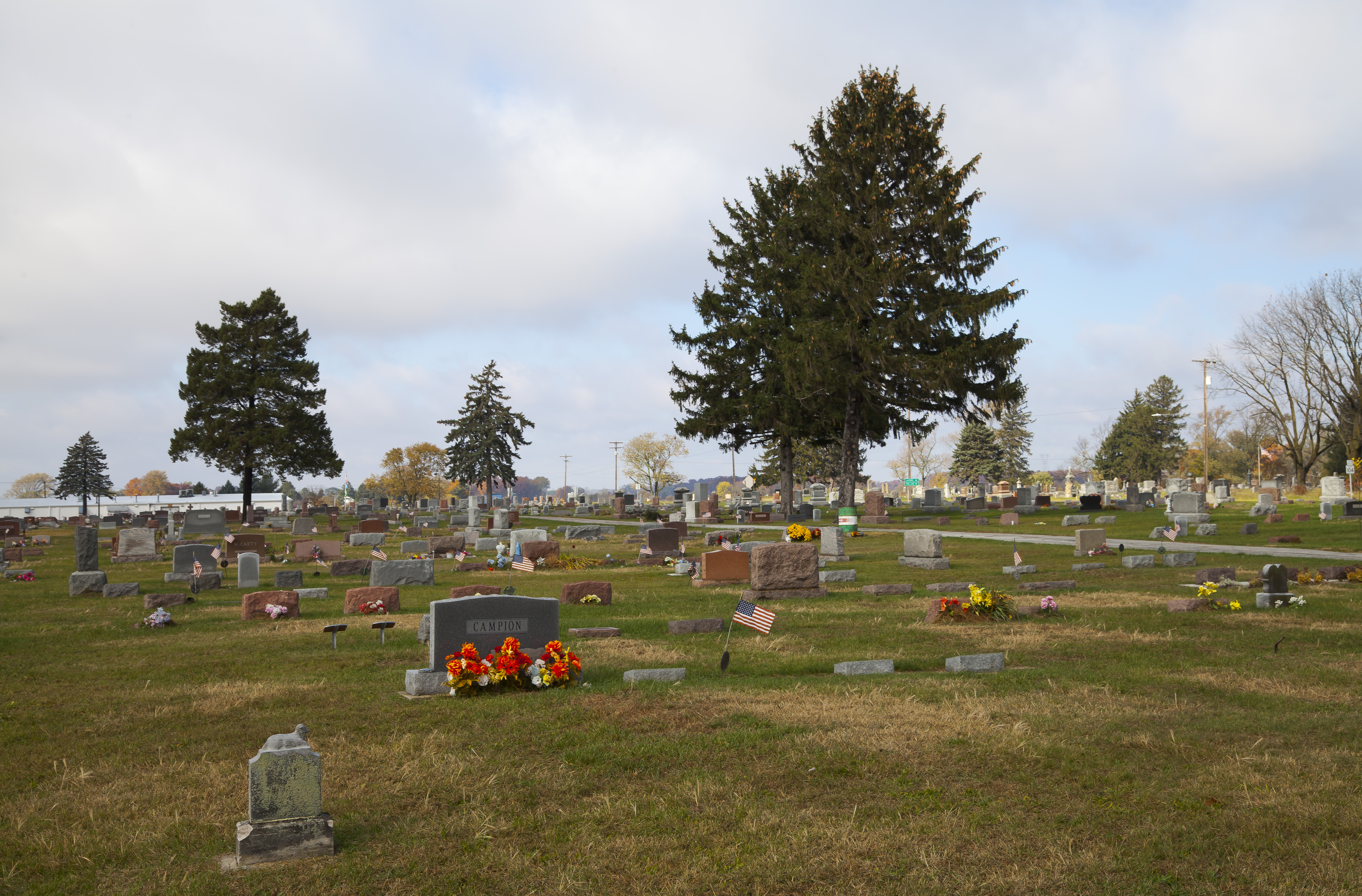
Cemetery in Walker.

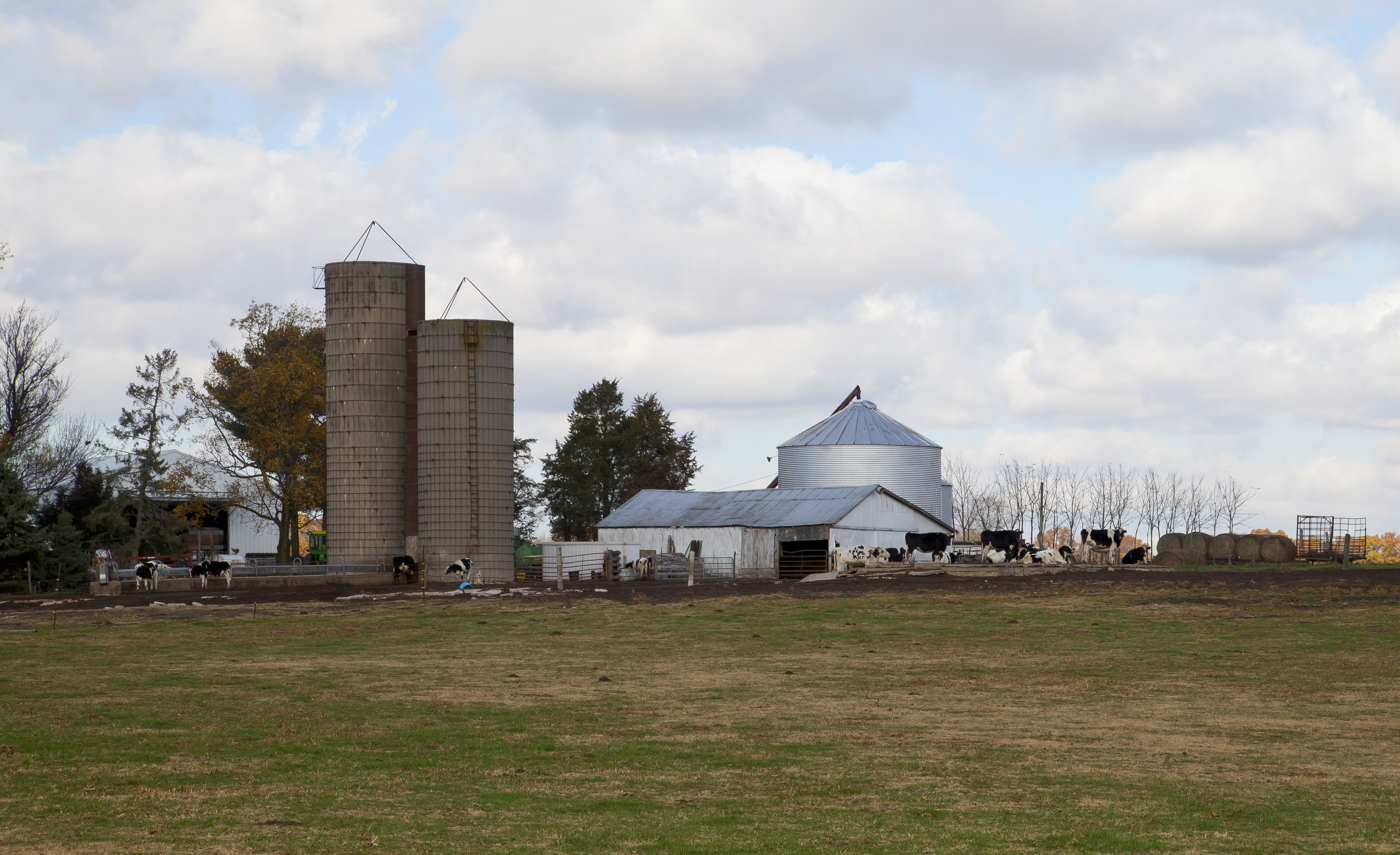
Farm in Walker.

Walker Township is one of thirteen townships in Jasper County, Indiana, United States. As of the 2020 census, its population was 3,692 (up from 3,663 at 2010) and it contained 1,347 housing units.

Walker Township was established in 1851.

== Geography ==
According to the 2010 census, the township has a total area of 58.45 square miles (151.4 km^{2}), of which 58.09 square miles (150.5 km^{2}) (or 99.38%) is land and 0.37 square miles (0.96 km^{2}) (or 0.63%) is water.

=== Unincorporated towns ===
- Asphaltum
- Kniman

=== Politics ===
-As of October 2, 2020

Township Trustee:

- Ryan Myers (Republican)

Township Board Members:

- Brian Hanewich (Democratic)
- Stan Ketchum (Democratic)
- David B Whitaker (Democratic)

=== Adjacent townships ===
- Kankakee Township (northeast)
- Railroad Township, Starke County (northeast)
- Cass Township, Pulaski County (east)
- Gillam Township (southeast)
- Barkley Township (south)
- Keener Township (west)
- Union Township (west)
- Wheatfield Township (northwest)

=== Cemeteries ===
The township contains three cemeteries: Hershman, Kniman and Lutheran.

=== Major highways ===
- U.S. Route 231
- Indiana State Road 49
- Indiana State Road 110

== Education ==
Walker Township residents are eligible to obtain a free library card from the Jasper County Public Library.
