= Barkley Township, Jasper County, Indiana =

Barkley Township
- Township
- Location in Jasper County
- Coordinates: 41°01′33″N 87°04′20″W
- Country: United States
- State: Indiana
- County: Jasper

Government
  - Type: Indiana township

Area
  - Total: 59.92 sq mi (155.2 km^{2})
  - Land: 59.9 sq mi (155 km^{2})
  - Water: 0.01 sq mi (0.026 km^{2}) 0.02%
- Elevation: 690 ft (210 m)

Population (2020)
  - Total: 915
  - Density: 15/sq mi (5.8/km^{2})
- GNIS feature ID: 0453095

Barkley Township is one of thirteen townships in Jasper County, Indiana, United States. As of the 2020 census, its population was 915 (up from 900 in 2010) and it contained 373 housing units.

== History ==
Barkley Township was established in 1838. It was named for Henry Barkley Sr.

== Geography ==
According to the 2010 census, the township has a total area of 59.92 square miles (155.2 km^{2}), of which 59.9 square miles (155 km^{2}) (or 99.97%) is land and 0.01 square miles (0.026 km^{2}) (or 0.02%) is water.

=== Unincorporated towns ===
- Gifford
- Newland

=== Extinct towns ===
- Lewiston
- Moody

=== Adjacent townships ===
- Walker Township (north)
- Gillam Township (east)
- Hanging Grove Township (southeast)
- Marion Township (southwest)
- Union Township (west)

=== Cemeteries ===
The township contains nine cemeteries: Brown, Dunkard, Hankle, Parkison, Prater, Price, Rees, Sandridge and Smith.

=== Major highways ===
- Indiana State Road 14
- Indiana State Road 49

== Education ==
Barkley Township residents may request a free library card from the Jasper County Public Library.
