= Jasper County Airport =

Jasper County Airport may refer to:

- Jasper County Airport (Indiana), Rensselaer, Indiana, United States (IATA: RNZ, ICAO: KRZL, FAA LID: RZL)
- Jasper County Airport (Texas), an airport in Texas, United States (IATA: JAS, ICAO: KJAS, FAA LID: JAS)
