= Virgie =

Virgie may refer to a place in the United States:

- Virgie, Indiana
- Virgie, Kentucky
