= Kankakee Valley School Corporation =

School district in Indiana, United States

Coordinates: 41°11′23.3″N 87°08′57.3″W

Kankakee Valley School Corporation is a school district in Indiana, headquartered in Wheatfield Township, near Wheatfield.

The district includes Wheatfield, DeMotte, and the Jasper County portion of Roselawn.

== Schools ==
Secondary schools:

- Kankakee Valley High School (Wheatfield Township)
- Kankakee Valley Middle School (Wheatfield Township)

Primary schools:

- Kankakee Valley Intermediate School (Wheatfield Township)
- DeMotte Elementary School (DeMotte)
- Wheatfield Elementary School (Wheatfield)
