= IN-10 =

IN-10, IN 10, or IN10 may refer to:

- Indiana's 10th congressional district
- Indiana State Road 10
