= Jasper County, Indiana =

County in Indiana, United States

Jasper County
- County
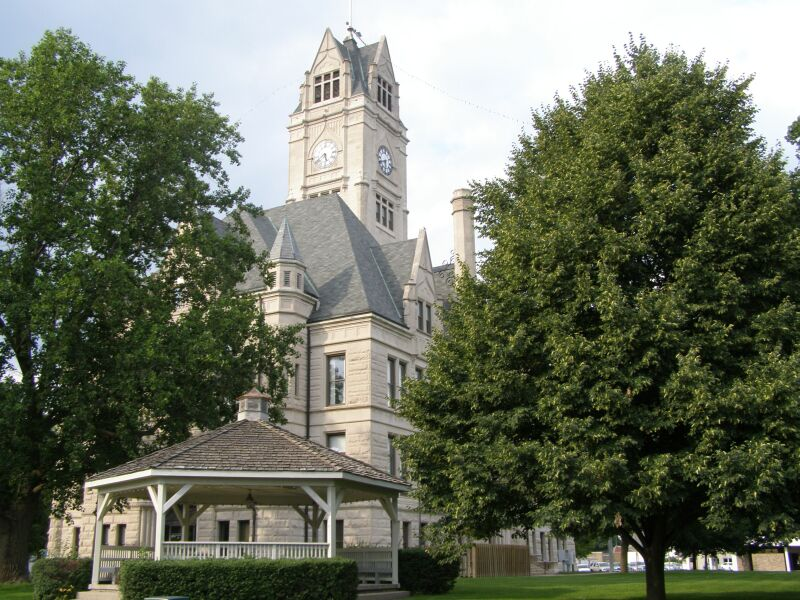
- Jasper County Courthouse in Rensselaer

- Location in the state of Indiana

- Indiana's location in the United States
- Coordinates: 41°01′N 87°07′W
- Country: United States
- State: Indiana
- Region: Northwest Indiana
- Metro area: Chicago Metropolitan
- Created: February 7, 1835
- Established: March 15, 1838
- Named for: Sgt. William Jasper
- County seat: Rensselaer
- Largest city: Rensselaer
- Boroughs: List: DeMotte (town); Remington (town); Rensselaer (city); Wheatfield (town)

Government
  - Type: County
  - Body: Board of Commissioners
  - Commissioner: James A. Walstra (1st)
  - Commissioner: Kendell Culp (2nd)
  - Commissioner: Richard E. Maxwell (3rd)

Area
  - County: 561.39 sq mi (1,454.0 km^{2})
  - Land: 559.62 sq mi (1,449.4 km^{2})
  - Water: 1.76 sq mi (4.6 km^{2})
  - Metro: 10,874 sq mi (28,160 km^{2})
  - Rank: 3rd largest county in Indiana
  - Region: 2,726 sq mi (7,060 km^{2})
- Elevation: 696 ft (212 m)

Population (2020)
  - County: 32,918
  - Estimate (2025): 33,894 ▲
  - Rank: 49th largest county in Indiana
  - Density: 58.822/sq mi (22.711/km^{2})
  - Metro: 9,618,502
- Time zone: UTC−6 (Central)
  - Summer (DST): UTC−5 (Central)
- ZIP Codes: 46310, 46341, 46374, 46392, 47922, 47943, 47946, 47948, 47957, 47959, 47977-78, 47995
- Area code: 219
- Congressional district: 4th
- Indiana Senate districts: 5th and 7th
- Indiana House of Representatives districts: 4th, 16th and 20th
- FIPS code: 18-073
- GNIS feature ID: 0450494
- Interstate and U.S. Route: link = Interstate 65 in Indiana link = U.S. Route 24 link = U.S. Route 231
- State Routes: link = Indiana State Road 10 link = Indiana State Road 14 link = Indiana State Road 16 link = Indiana State Road 49 link = Indiana State Road 110 link = Indiana State Road 114
- Airport: Jasper County
- Waterways: Iroquois River – Kankakee River
- Amtrak station: Rensselaer
- Website: www.jaspercountyin.gov
- Indiana county number 37

Demographics (2010)
Demographic	Proportion
White	95.8%
Black	0.6%
Asian	0.4%
Islander	0.0%
Native	0.2%
Other	3.0%
Hispanic (any race)	5.4%

Jasper County is a county located in the U.S. state of Indiana. As of 2020, the population was 32,918. The county seat is Rensselaer. Jasper County is included in the Chicago metropolitan area.

== History ==
The lands of present NW Indiana were explored by French explorer Robert de LaSalle. At that time, the area was inhabited by the Miami Confederation of Indians. Through White settlement, encroachment, and confrontation, the various indigenous groups were forced to cede their claim to the area. In October 1818, the Pottawattamies, Weas, and Delawares ceded their lands west of the Tippecanoe River to the government. In a treaty dated October 23, 1826, the Pottawattamies and Miamis ceded all their lands east of the Tippecanoe. A treaty dated October 26, 1832, with the Pottawattamies ceded control of the northwestern part of Indiana; on October 27 the Pottawattamies of Indiana and Michigan also relinquished all claim to any remaining land in those states.

Until the 1832 treaty of 1832, the future Jasper County area was not open to settlement; those who did come to Indiana before that time had flooded the southern parts of Ohio, Indiana and Illinois through the Ohio Valley. Northwestern Indiana was also less desirable for initial settlement, the land being described as alternate swamps, sterile sand ridges and flat, wet prairies. It did proliferate in game, however, and eventually settlers found it. The first recorded settler was William Donahue, who located in present-day Gillam Township. He was a justice of the peace during the period prior to the county's establishment.

Although the settlers were sparse, the state legislature provided for two counties to be established in the area. The state legislature passed an omnibus bill that authorized thirteen counties and described their boundaries, although their governing structures were not established at that time. The new counties of Jasper and Newton were attached to White County for political and civil purposes.

In 1836 all the area north of the Kankakee River was partitioned from Jasper as Porter County. By 1837 preparations were made to create the Jasper County governing structure, with a county commission elected that year. They first met in January 1838 at the house of Robert Alexander in present-day Benton County. After that, the pro tem county seat was designated as the residence of George W. Spitler, in present-day Iroquois Township, Newton County and the first meeting was held in March 1839. The official date of formation of the Jasper County government is given as March 15, 1838.

Jasper County was named for Sgt. William Jasper, a famous scout for the Continental Army during the American Revolutionary War. Jasper became famous in 1776, during the bombardment of Fort Moultrie, for erecting a new flagstaff under fire after the American flag had been shot down. Jasper was killed during the Siege of Savannah in 1779. Jasper County's twin county, Newton County, was named after Jasper's friend and comrade, John Newton.

A state legislature act dated January 29, 1839, caused the consolidation of Jasper and Newton, with Jasper retaining the name, and Newton being removed, and the consolidated area being seated at the Falls of the Iroquois River, with the name of Newton (the community's name was changed to Rensselaer in 1844). In 1840 the county of Benton was formed from Jasper's area. In 1859 the county of Newton was revived but with smaller area than before, leaving Jasper in its present form.

=== The Civil War ===
As early as 1825, the majority of the population were against slavery. By the time of the War, Jasper County was one of the few counties of Indiana that had a military organization under the law of 1855. The war greatly affected Jasper County when 935 soldiers were enlisted on behalf of the Union. This was considered an impressive amount at the time, with the average population around 5,000. Although there were several companies from Indiana, the 9th Indiana Infantry Regiment produced Robert H. Milroy, the "Gray Eagle of the Army". Milroy became famous for suppressing Confederate mountain rangers, which caused the Confederate Congress to declare a $100,000 bounty on his head. The 9th Indiana Infantry Regiment became known for its involvement in the Battle of Philippi, one of the earliest battles of the Civil War at Laurel Hill (now known as Laurel Mountain). In comparing the proportions of men able to fight, Indiana contributed more soldiers than any other state to the Union.

== Geography ==
According to the 2010 census, the county has a total area of 561.39 square miles (1,454.0 km^{2}), of which 559.62 square miles (1,449.4 km^{2}) (or 99.68%) is land and 1.76 square miles (4.6 km^{2}) (or 0.31%) is water. Until the middle of the 19th century when it was drained to make farmland, this county was part of the second-largest freshwater wetland in the US, with abundant flora and fauna. This is caused by the Iroquois River, one of the main tributaries of the Kankakee River that flows throughout Jasper County, a major water source for the area.

=== Major highways ===
- Interstate 65
- U.S. Route 24
- U.S. Route 231
- Indiana State Road 10
- Indiana State Road 14
- Indiana State Road 16
- Indiana State Road 49
- Indiana State Road 110
- Indiana State Road 114

=== Railroads ===
- CSX Transportation
- Norfolk Southern Railway
- Toledo, Peoria and Western Railway

=== Adjacent counties ===
- Porter County - north
- La Porte County - northeast
- Starke County - northeast
- Pulaski County - east
- White County - southeast
- Benton County - south
- Newton County - west
- Lake County - northwest

== Municipalities ==
The municipalities in Jasper County, and their populations as of the 2020 census, are:

=== Cities ===
- Rensselaer – 5,733

=== Towns ===
- De Motte – 4,168
- Remington – 1,356
- Wheatfield – 904

=== Census-designated places ===
- Collegeville – 84
- Roselawn – 4,132

=== Unincorporated communities ===
- Aix
- Asphaltum
- Baileys Corner
- Dunns Bridge
- Fair Oaks
- Fountain Park
- Gifford Park
- Kersey
- Kniman
- McCoysburg
- Newland
- Parr
- Tefft
- Virgie

== Townships ==
The 13 townships of Jasper County, with their populations as of the 2020 census, are:

- Barkley – 915
- Carpenter – 1,925
- Gillam – 619
- Hanging Grove – 209
- Jordan – 326
- Kankakee – 913
- Keener – 10,625
- Marion – 6,648
- Milroy – 256
- Newton – 825
- Union – 1,588
- Walker – 3,692
- Wheatfield – 4,377

== Education ==
Residents of Jasper County attend public schools administered by four different districts in multiple counties:

- Kankakee Valley School Corporation
- Rensselaer Central Schools Corporation
- Tri-County School Corporation
- West Central School Corporation

High Schools

- Kankakee Valley High School
- Rensselaer Central High School
- Covenant Christian High School in DeMotte (grades 9–12)

Middle Schools

- Kankakee Valley Middle School
- Rensselaer Central Middle School

Elementary Schools

- DeMotte Christian Elementary School (preschool through 8)
- DeMotte Elementary School
- Kankakee Valley Intermediate School
- St. Augustine Catholic School
- Tri-County Primary School (K-2nd)
- Van Rensselaer Elementary School
- Wheatfield Elementary School

=== Colleges and Universities ===
- Saint Joseph's College (closed)

== Hospitals ==
- Franciscan Health Rensselaer, Rensselaer – 46 beds

== Climate and weather ==
Rensselaer, Indiana

Climate chart (precipitation, max. and min. temperature)
J	F	M	A	M	J	J	A	S	O	N	D
2 30 14	1.7 36 19	3.1 47 29	3.5 60 39	4.2 72 50	4.3 81 60	3.8 85 64	3.5 83 61	3.3 76 53	3 64 41	3.2 49 32	2.7 36 21
- █ Average max. and min. temperatures in °F
- █ Precipitation totals in inches
- Source: The Weather Channel
Metric conversion
J	F	M	A	M	J	J	A	S	O	N	D
50 −1 −10	42 2 −7	79 8 −2	89 16 4	108 22 10	110 27 16	98 29 18	88 28 16	83 24 12	76 18 5	82 9 0	70 2 −6
- █ Average max. and min. temperatures in °C
- █ Precipitation totals in mm

In recent years, average temperatures in Rensselaer have ranged from a low of 14 °F (−10 °C) in January to a high of 85 °F (29 °C) in July, although a record low of −25 °F (−32 °C) was recorded in January 1985 and a record high of 104 °F (40 °C) was recorded in August 1988. Average monthly precipitation ranged from 1.67 inches (42 mm) in February to 4.34 inches (110 mm) in June.

== Government ==
The county government is a constitutional body, granted specific powers by the Constitution of Indiana and the Indiana Code.

County Council: The county council is the legislative branch of the county government and controls all the spending and revenue collection in the county. Representatives are elected from county districts. The council members serve four-year terms. They are responsible for setting salaries, the annual budget, and special spending. The council also has limited authority to impose local taxes, in the form of an income and property tax that is subject to state level approval, excise taxes, and service taxes.

Board of Commissioners: The executive body of the county is made of a board of commissioners. The commissioners are elected county-wide, in staggered terms, and each serves a four-year term. One of the commissioners, typically the most senior, serves as president. The commissioners are charged with executing the acts legislated by the council, collecting revenue, and managing the day-to-day functions of the county government.

Court: The county maintains a small claims court that can handle some civil cases. The judge on the court is elected to a term of four years and must be a member of the Indiana Bar Association. The judge is assisted by a constable who is also elected to a four-year term. In some cases, court decisions can be appealed to the state level circuit court.

County Officials: The county has several other elected offices, including sheriff, coroner, auditor, treasurer, recorder, surveyor, and circuit court clerk, elected to four-year terms. Members elected to any county government position are required to declare a political party affiliation and to be residents of the county.

Jasper County is part of Indiana's 4th congressional district. It is also part of Indiana Senate districts 5 and 7 and Indiana House of Representatives districts 4, 16 and 20.

United States presidential election results for Jasper County, Indiana
Year	Republican		Democratic		Third party(ies)	
Year	No.	%	No.	%	No.	%
1888	1,604	59.30%	1,003	37.08%	98	3.62%
1892	1,364	49.98%	937	34.33%	428	15.68%
1896	2,032	55.05%	1,608	43.57%	51	1.38%
1900	2,083	55.33%	1,580	41.97%	102	2.71%
1904	2,137	58.58%	1,341	36.76%	170	4.66%
1908	1,939	55.19%	1,495	42.56%	79	2.25%
1912	1,238	37.54%	1,292	39.18%	768	23.29%
1916	1,995	56.50%	1,488	42.14%	48	1.36%
1920	3,942	66.87%	1,872	31.76%	81	1.37%
1924	3,679	64.36%	1,744	30.51%	293	5.13%
1928	3,700	65.65%	1,915	33.98%	21	0.37%
1932	2,897	44.54%	3,538	54.40%	69	1.06%
1936	3,540	52.67%	3,109	46.26%	72	1.07%
1940	4,462	61.62%	2,751	37.99%	28	0.39%
1944	4,364	66.63%	2,168	33.10%	18	0.27%
1948	4,320	65.42%	2,216	33.56%	67	1.01%
1952	5,556	72.23%	2,102	27.33%	34	0.44%
1956	5,374	72.63%	2,004	27.08%	21	0.28%
1960	5,364	64.32%	2,959	35.48%	16	0.19%
1964	4,497	52.81%	3,995	46.91%	24	0.28%
1968	4,996	60.54%	2,201	26.67%	1,055	12.78%
1972	6,369	76.21%	1,920	22.97%	68	0.81%
1976	5,398	60.76%	3,286	36.99%	200	2.25%
1980	6,316	68.09%	2,544	27.43%	416	4.48%
1984	6,537	69.22%	2,821	29.87%	86	0.91%
1988	6,009	64.67%	3,237	34.84%	46	0.50%
1992	4,809	48.62%	3,033	30.67%	2,048	20.71%
1996	5,173	51.33%	3,554	35.27%	1,350	13.40%
2000	7,212	64.58%	3,744	33.53%	211	1.89%
2004	8,056	68.02%	3,678	31.05%	110	0.93%
2008	7,669	59.39%	5,044	39.06%	200	1.55%
2012	7,955	61.57%	4,672	36.16%	293	2.27%
2016	9,382	69.61%	3,329	24.70%	767	5.69%
2020	11,383	73.56%	3,798	24.54%	294	1.90%
2024	12,082	76.25%	3,489	22.02%	275	1.74%

== Demographics ==
Historical population
Census	Pop.	Note	%±
1840	1,267		—
1850	3,540		179.4%
1860	4,291		21.2%
1870	6,354		48.1%
1880	9,464		48.9%
1890	11,185		18.2%
1900	14,292		27.8%
1910	13,044		−8.7%
1920	13,961		7.0%
1930	13,388		−4.1%
1940	14,397		7.5%
1950	17,031		18.3%
1960	18,842		10.6%
1970	20,429		8.4%
1980	26,138		27.9%
1990	24,960		−4.5%
2000	30,043		20.4%
2010	33,478		11.4%
2020	32,918		−1.7%
2025 (est.)	33,894	▲	3.0%
US Decennial Census; 1790-1960 1900-1990; 1990-2000 2010

=== Racial and ethnic composition ===
Jasper County, Indiana – Racial and ethnic composition Note: the US Census treats Hispanic/Latino as an ethnic category. This table excludes Latinos from the racial categories and assigns them to a separate category. Hispanics/Latinos may be of any race.
Race / Ethnicity (NH = Non-Hispanic)	Pop 1980	Pop 1990	Pop 2000	Pop 2010	Pop 2020	% 1980	% 1990	% 2000	% 2010	% 2020
White alone (NH)	25,736	24,440	28,941	30,988	29,084	98.46%	97.92%	96.33%	92.56%	88.35%
Black or African American alone (NH)	54	109	102	208	129	0.21%	0.44%	0.34%	0.62%	0.39%
Native American or Alaska Native alone (NH)	15	50	47	53	53	0.06%	0.20%	0.16%	0.16%	0.16%
Asian alone (NH)	31	40	55	123	90	0.12%	0.16%	0.18%	0.37%	0.27%
Native Hawaiian or Pacific Islander alone (NH)	x	x	0	9	10	x	x	0.00%	0.03%	0.03%
Other race alone (NH)	27	4	4	16	43	0.10%	0.02%	0.01%	0.05%	0.13%
Mixed race or Multiracial (NH)	x	x	161	258	1,167	x	x	0.54%	0.77%	3.55%
Hispanic or Latino (any race)	275	317	733	1,823	2,342	1.05%	1.27%	2.44%	5.45%	7.11%
Total	26,138	24,960	30,043	33,478	32,918	100.00%	100.00%	100.00%	100.00%	100.00%

=== 2020 census ===
As of the 2020 census, the county had a population of 32,918. The median age was 41.1 years. 24.0% of residents were under the age of 18 and 18.3% of residents were 65 years of age or older. For every 100 females there were 99.1 males, and for every 100 females age 18 and over there were 97.8 males age 18 and over.

The racial makeup of the county was 90.2% White, 0.4% Black or African American, 0.3% American Indian and Alaska Native, 0.3% Asian, 0.1% Native Hawaiian and Pacific Islander, 2.7% from some other race, and 6.0% from two or more races. Hispanic or Latino residents of any race comprised 7.1% of the population.

16.7% of residents lived in urban areas, while 83.3% lived in rural areas.

There were 12,728 households in the county, of which 31.5% had children under the age of 18 living in them. Of all households, 55.8% were married-couple households, 16.5% were households with a male householder and no spouse or partner present, and 20.7% were households with a female householder and no spouse or partner present. About 23.9% of all households were made up of individuals and 11.5% had someone living alone who was 65 years of age or older.

There were 13,515 housing units, of which 5.8% were vacant. Among occupied housing units, 77.0% were owner-occupied and 23.0% were renter-occupied. The homeowner vacancy rate was 1.2% and the rental vacancy rate was 6.8%.

=== 2010 census ===
As of the 2010 United States census, there were 33,478 people, 12,232 households, and 9,165 families in the county. The population density was 59.8 inhabitants per square mile (23.1/km^{2}). There were 13,168 housing units at an average density of 23.5 per square mile (9.1/km^{2}). The racial makeup of the county was 95.8% white, 0.6% black or African American, 0.4% Asian, 0.2% American Indian, 2.0% from other races, and 1.0% from two or more races. Those of Hispanic or Latino origin made up 5.4% of the population. In terms of ancestry, 27.6% were German, 16.5% were Irish, 9.6% were Dutch, 9.3% were English, 6.9% were American, and 6.0% were Polish.

Of the 12,232 households, 35.8% had children under the age of 18 living with them, 60.7% were married couples living together, 9.3% had a female householder with no husband present, 25.1% were non-families, and 20.9% of all households were made up of individuals. The average household size was 2.66 and the average family size was 3.07. The median age was 38.0 years.

The median income for a household in the county was $47,697 and the median income for a family was $63,842. Males had a median income of $50,984 versus $32,313 for females. The per capita income for the county was $23,676. About 7.7% of families and 9.0% of the population were below the poverty line, including 14.1% of those under age 18 and 5.7% of those age 65 or over.

=== Religion ===
The Catholic Church is the biggest denomination in the county with 4,341 members, the second largest is the Reformed Church in America with 1,502 members and 2 churches (First Church and American Reformed Church), the third largest is the United Methodist Church with 1,300 members, and the fourth largest is the Christian Reformed Church in North America with 1,013 members in 3 congregations as of 2010.

== See also ==
- National Register of Historic Places listings in Jasper County, Indiana
