= Newland, Indiana =

- Unincorporated community
- Location within Indiana Location within the United States
- Coordinates: 41°02′45″N 87°02′03″W
- Country: United States
- State: Indiana
- County: Jasper
- Township: Barkley
- Elevation: 686 ft (209 m)
- ZIP code: 47978
- FIPS code: 18-53100
- GNIS feature ID: 440141

Newland is an extinct unincorporated community in Barkley Township, Jasper County, Indiana, United States.

== History ==
A post office was established at Newland in 1901, and remained in operation until it was discontinued in 1925. A swamp which was drained to form the land where Newland stands caused the name to be selected.

== Geography ==
Newland is located at 41°02′45″N 87°02′03″W.
