= McCoysburg, Indiana =

- Unincorporated community
- Location within Indiana Location within the United States
- Coordinates: 40°54′52″N 87°01′19″W
- Country: United States
- State: Indiana
- County: Jasper
- Township: Hanging Grove
- Elevation: 669 ft (204 m)
- ZIP code: 47978
- FIPS code: 18-45666
- GNIS feature ID: 438827

McCoysburg is an unincorporated community in Hanging Grove Township, Jasper County, Indiana, United States.

Alfred McCoy was an original owner of the town site.

== Geography ==
McCoysburg is located at 40°54′52″N 87°01′19″W.
