= Union Township, Jasper County, Indiana =

Union Township
- Township
- Location in Jasper County
- Coordinates: 41°04′43″N 87°12′32″W
- Country: United States
- State: Indiana
- County: Jasper

Government
  - Type: Indiana township

Area
  - Total: 56.59 sq mi (146.6 km^{2})
  - Land: 56.41 sq mi (146.1 km^{2})
  - Water: 0.18 sq mi (0.47 km^{2}) 0.32%
- Elevation: 690 ft (210 m)

Population (2020)
  - Total: 1,588
  - Density: 28.1/sq mi (10.8/km^{2})
- GNIS feature ID: 0453920

Union Township is one of thirteen townships in Jasper County, Indiana, United States. As of the 2020 census, its population was 1,588 (a tiny increase of 1,586 from 2010) and it contained 592 housing units.

Union Township was founded in 1868.

== Geography ==
According to the 2010 census, the township has a total area of 56.59 square miles (146.6 km^{2}), of which 56.41 square miles (146.1 km^{2}) (or 99.68%) is land and 0.18 square miles (0.47 km^{2}) (or 0.32%) is water.

=== Unincorporated towns ===
- Aix
- Fair Oaks
- Moffitt
- Parr
- Rosebud
- Virgie

=== Adjacent townships ===
- Keener Township (north)
- Barkley Township (east)
- Walker Township (east)
- Marion Township (southeast)
- Newton Township (south)
- Colfax Township, Newton County (west)
- Lincoln Township, Newton County (northwest)

=== Cemeteries ===
The township contains one cemetery, Yeoman.

=== Major highways ===
- Interstate 65
- U.S. Route 231
- Indiana State Road 14

== Education ==
Union Township residents are eligible to obtain a free library card from the Jasper County Public Library.
