= Roselawn, Indiana =

- Census-designated place
- Location of Roselawn in Jasper County and Newton County, Indiana.
- Coordinates: 41°09′13″N 87°17′17″W
- Country: United States
- State: Indiana
- Counties: Newton, Jasper
- Townships: Lincoln, Keener

Area
  - Total: 8.06 sq mi (20.88 km^{2})
  - Land: 8.05 sq mi (20.85 km^{2})
  - Water: 0.012 sq mi (0.03 km^{2})
- Elevation: 679 ft (207 m)

Population (2020)
  - Total: 4,132
  - Density: 513.2/sq mi (198.16/km^{2})
- Time zone: UTC-6 (Central (CST))
  - Summer (DST): UTC-5 (CDT)
- ZIP code: 46372
- Area code: 219
- FIPS code: 18-66006
- GNIS feature ID: 2393214

Roselawn is a census-designated place (CDP) in Newton and Jasper counties in the U.S. state of Indiana. As of the 2020 census, Roselawn had a population of 4,132.

Since the opening of Club Zoro Nature Park in 1933, Roselawn has been known for its nudist resorts. Today it hosts two such resorts: the Ponderosa Sun Club and Sun Aura. Sun Aura resort was previously known as Naked City, but closed in 1986 after its operator, Dick Drost, encountered significant legal troubles. The resort continued to operate under several different owners and was known as Sunspot resort prior to becoming Sun Aura.

== History ==
Roselawn was laid out in 1882. The community's name is an amalgamation of the names of early merchants Orlando Rose and Lon Craig. A post office has been in operation at Roselawn since 1881.

On October 31, 1994, American Eagle Flight 4184 crashed near Roselawn, killing all 64 passengers and four crew members aboard.

== Geography ==
The original center of Roselawn is in northeastern Newton County, with the CDP extending eastward into northwestern Jasper County. Indiana State Road 10 passes through the community, leading east and north 8 miles (13 km) to DeMotte, and west the same distance to Lake Village. Interstate 65 passes through the eastern part of the community, with access from Exit 230 (State Road 10); I-65 leads north 33 miles (53 km) to Gary and south 58 miles (93 km) to Lafayette.

According to the United States Census Bureau, the Roselawn CDP has a total area of 8.1 square miles (20.9 km^{2}), of which 0.01 square miles (0.03 km^{2}), or 0.15%, are water.

== Demographics ==
Historical population
Census	Pop.	Note	%±
2020	4,132		—
U.S. Decennial Census

=== 2020 census ===
As of the 2020 census, Roselawn had a population of 4,132. The median age was 40.7 years. 23.5% of residents were under the age of 18 and 17.5% of residents were 65 years of age or older. For every 100 females there were 101.1 males, and for every 100 females age 18 and over there were 103.0 males age 18 and over.

0.0% of residents lived in urban areas, while 100.0% lived in rural areas.

There were 1,516 households in Roselawn, of which 31.5% had children under the age of 18 living in them. Of all households, 56.1% were married-couple households, 17.3% were households with a male householder and no spouse or partner present, and 18.2% were households with a female householder and no spouse or partner present. About 20.2% of all households were made up of individuals and 9.9% had someone living alone who was 65 years of age or older.

There were 1,577 housing units, of which 3.9% were vacant. The homeowner vacancy rate was 1.1% and the rental vacancy rate was 8.4%.

Racial composition as of the 2020 census
Race	Number	Percent
White	3,588	86.8%
Black or African American	19	0.5%
American Indian and Alaska Native	7	0.2%
Asian	9	0.2%
Native Hawaiian and Other Pacific Islander	4	0.1%
Some other race	165	4.0%
Two or more races	340	8.2%
Hispanic or Latino (of any race)	460	11.1%

=== 2000 census ===
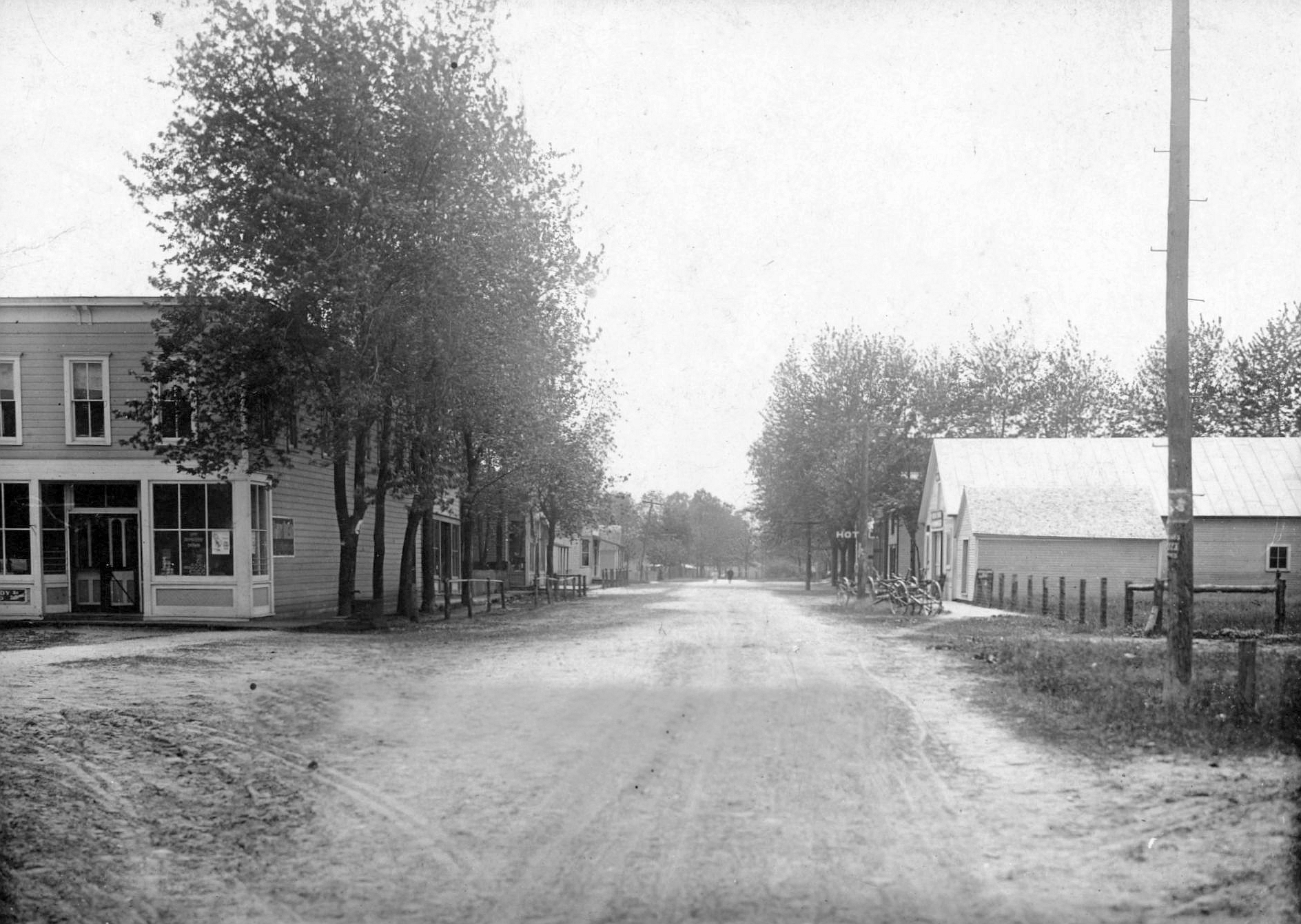
Roselawn, 1910

As of the 2000 census, there were 3,933 people, 1,286 households, and 1,099 families residing in the CDP. The population density was 484.4 inhabitants per square mile (187.0/km^{2}). There were 1,326 housing units at an average density of 163.3 per square mile (63.1/km^{2}). The racial makeup of the CDP was 97.30% White, 0.15% African American, 0.13% Native American, 0.28% Asian, 0.18% Pacific Islander, 0.97% from other races, and 0.99% from two or more races. Hispanic or Latino of any race were 3.33% of the population.

There were 1,286 households, out of which 41.4% had children under the age of 18 living with them, 71.7% were married couples living together, 9.2% had a female householder with no husband present, and 14.5% were non-families. 11.7% of all households were made up of individuals, and 3.0% had someone living alone who was 65 years of age or older. The average household size was 2.99 and the average family size was 3.22.

In the CDP, the population was spread out, with 29.3% under the age of 18, 7.5% from 18 to 24, 29.6% from 25 to 44, 24.7% from 45 to 64, and 8.9% who were 65 years of age or older. The median age was 34 years. For every 100 females, there were 101.3 males. For every 100 females age 18 and over, there were 96.5 males.

The median income for a household in the CDP was $48,625, and the median income for a family was $49,351. Males had a median income of $42,284 versus $18,208 for females. The per capita income for the CDP was $19,136. About 4.3% of families and 3.9% of the population were below the poverty line, including 3.0% of those under age 18 and none of those age 65 or over.

== Education ==
The portion of Roselawn in Newton County is in the North Newton School Corporation. Lincoln Elementary is in the Roselawn CDP, and has a De Motte postal address. North Newton Jr-Sr High School, the public high school of the district, is located north of Morocco CDP and has a Morocco postal address.

The portion of Roselawn in Jasper County is in the Kankakee Valley School Corporation (K-12 school district).

Roselawn has a public library, a branch of the Newton County Public Library.
