= Illinois Route 114 =

State highway in Kankakee County, Illinois, US

Illinois Route 114
- IL 114 highlighted in red

Route information
- Maintained by IDOT
- Length: 7.40 mi (11.91 km)
- Existed: 1924–present

Major junctions
- West end: IL 1 / IL 17 in Momence
- East end: SR 10 in Momence Township

Location
- Country: United States
- State: Illinois
- Counties: Kankakee

Highway system
- Illinois State Highway System; Interstate; US; State; Tollways; Scenic
← IL 113	→ IL 115

Illinois Route 114 is a rural east–west state route that connects State Road 10 in Indiana, USA, with Illinois Route 1 and Illinois Route 17 (Dixie Highway), which overlap in Momence. This is a distance of 7.40 miles (11.91 km).

== Route description ==
Illinois 114 follows the southern bank of the Kankakee River for its entire length, and is the access road for the small camps on the Kankakee River east of Momence. It is a two-lane, undivided surface road.

== History ==
SBI Route 114 was established in 1924. Its routing has not changed since it was initially designated.

== Major intersections ==
County	Location	mi	km	Destinations	Notes
Kankakee	Momence	0.00	0.00	IL 1 / IL 17 (South Range Street) – Kankakee, Grant Park	Western terminus of IL 114
Kankakee	Momence Township	7.40	11.91	SR 10 east – Lake Village	Indiana state line; eastern terminus of IL 114
1.000 mi = 1.609 km; 1.000 km = 0.621 mi
