= Kersey, Indiana =

- Unincorporated community
- Location within Indiana Location within the United States
- Coordinates: 41°11′39″N 87°09′23″W
- Country: United States
- State: Indiana
- County: Jasper
- Township: Wheatfield
- Elevation: 663 ft (202 m)
- ZIP code: 46310 (DeMotte), 46392 (Wheatfield)
- Area code: 219
- FIPS code: 18-39600
- GNIS feature ID: 450440

Kersey is an unincorporated community in Wheatfield Township, Jasper County, Indiana, United States. A post office was established at Kersey in 1900, and remained in operation until it was discontinued in 1955.

== Geography ==
Kersey is located at 41°11′39″N 87°09′23″W.
