= Fair Oaks, Indiana =

- Unincorporated community
- Location within Indiana Location within the United States
- Coordinates: 41°04′30″N 87°15′27″W
- Country: United States
- State: Indiana
- County: Jasper
- Township: Union
- Elevation: 702 ft (214 m)
- ZIP code: 47943
- FIPS code: 18-22468
- GNIS feature ID: 449652

Fair Oaks is an unincorporated community and census designated place in Union Township, Jasper County, Indiana.

== History ==
Fair Oaks was made a station on the railroad built through that territory in the early 1880s. The Fair Oaks post office was established in 1884.

== Demographics ==
The United States Census Bureau first delineated Fair Oaks as a census designated place in the 2022 American Community Survey.
