= Hanging Grove Township, Jasper County, Indiana =

Hanging Grove Township
- Township
- Location in Jasper County
- Coordinates: 40°56′16″N 86°59′35″W
- Country: United States
- State: Indiana
- County: Jasper

Government
  - Type: Indiana township

Area
  - Total: 29.91 sq mi (77.5 km^{2})
  - Land: 29.91 sq mi (77.5 km^{2})
  - Water: 0 sq mi (0 km^{2}) 0%
- Elevation: 696 ft (212 m)

Population (2020)
  - Total: 209
  - Density: 7.7/sq mi (3.0/km^{2})
- GNIS feature ID: 0453368

Hanging Grove Township is one of thirteen townships in Jasper County, Indiana, United States. As of the 2020 census, its population was 209 (down from 230 at 2010) and it contained 96 housing units.

== Geography ==
According to the 2010 census, the township has a total area of 29.91 square miles (77.5 km^{2}), all land.

=== Unincorporated towns ===
- Hanging Grove
- McCoysburg

=== Adjacent townships ===
- Gillam Township (north)
- Salem Township, Pulaski County (east)
- Monon Township, White County (southeast)
- Milroy Township (southwest)
- Marion Township (west)
- Barkley Township (northwest)

=== Cemeteries ===
The township contains two cemeteries: Lefler and Osborne.

=== Major highways ===
- Indiana State Road 114

== Education ==
Hanging Grove Township residents may request a free library card from the Jasper County Public Library.
