= Keener Township, Jasper County, Indiana =

Keener Township
- Township
- Location in Jasper County
- Coordinates: 41°11′23″N 87°12′45″W
- Country: United States
- State: Indiana
- County: Jasper

Government
  - Type: Indiana township

Area
  - Total: 48.26 sq mi (125.0 km^{2})
  - Land: 48.11 sq mi (124.6 km^{2})
  - Water: 0.15 sq mi (0.39 km^{2}) 0.31%
- Elevation: 666 ft (203 m)

Population (2020)
  - Total: 10,625
  - Density: 210.1/sq mi (81.1/km^{2})
- GNIS feature ID: 0453522
- Website: keenertownship.com

Keener Township is one of thirteen townships in Jasper County, Indiana, United States. As of the 2020 census, its population was 10,625 (up from 10,110 at 2010) and it contained 4,176 housing units.

== History ==
Keener Township was established in 1858 and probably named after Jacob Keener, who settled in South Bend in 1855. A cabinet maker, stockholder of the Union Cabinet company as well as a politician, policeman, and saloon owner in South Bend, Jacob also established the Apollo - the "first German garden and place of amusement" in South Bend and a "favorite resort for politicians of both parties." The first German theater and masquerades in South Bend were held there.

== Geography ==
According to the 2010 census, the township has a total area of 48.26 square miles (125.0 km^{2}), of which 48.11 square miles (124.6 km^{2}) (or 99.69%) is land and 0.15 square miles (0.39 km^{2}) (or 0.31%) is water.

=== Cities and towns ===
- DeMotte
- Roselawn (southwest quarter)

=== Adjacent townships ===
- Boone Township, Porter County (northeast)
- Walker Township (east)
- Wheatfield Township (east)
- Union Township (south)
- Lincoln Township, Newton County (southwest)
- Eagle Creek Township, Lake County (northwest)

=== Cemeteries ===
The township contains three cemeteries: Cemetery of the Resurrection, DeMotte Cemetery, and First Church Cemetery (informally known as Holland Cemetery).

=== Major highways ===
- Interstate 65
- U.S. Route 231
- Indiana State Road 10
- Indiana State Road 110

=== Airports and landing strips ===
- DeMotte Airport

== Education ==
Keener Township residents are eligible to obtain a free library card from the Jasper County Public Library.
