= Parr, Indiana =

- Unincorporated community
- Location within Indiana Location within the United States
- Coordinates: 41°01′38″N 87°13′07″W
- Country: United States
- State: Indiana
- County: Jasper
- Township: Union
- Elevation: 692 ft (211 m)
- ZIP code: 47978
- FIPS code: 18-58248
- GNIS feature ID: 440908

Parr is an unincorporated community in Union Township, Jasper County, Indiana, United States.

== History ==
Parr was made a station on the railroad built through that territory in the early 1880s. A post office was established at Parr in 1893, and remained in operation until it was discontinued in 1968.

== Geography ==
Parr is located at 41°01′38″N 87°13′07″W.
