= Virgie, Indiana =

- Unincorporated community
- Location within Indiana Location within the United States
- Coordinates: 41°06′55″N 87°10′48″W
- Country: United States
- State: Indiana
- County: Jasper
- Township: Union
- Elevation: 689 ft (210 m)
- ZIP code: 47943
- FIPS code: 18-79221
- GNIS feature ID: 445311

Virgie is an unincorporated community in Union Township, Jasper County, Indiana.

== History ==
Virgie contained a post office from 1890 until 1913. The community was named for Virgie Warner, a daughter of a local resident.

== Geography ==
Virgie is located at 41°06′55″N 87°10′48″W.
