= Jasper County Airport (Indiana) =

- IATA: RNZ; ICAO: KRZL; FAA LID: RZL

Summary
- Airport type: Public
- Owner: Jasper County Board of Aviation Commissioners
- Serves: Jasper County
- Location: Rensselaer, Indiana
- Opened: May 1941
- Elevation AMSL: 698 ft (213 m)
- Coordinates: 40°56′52″N 087°10′57″W

Map
- Location of airport in Indiana/United States RZL (the United States)

Runways
Direction	Length		Surface
Direction	ft	m	Surface
18/36	4,000	1,220	Concrete
9/27	1,450	442	Turf

Statistics
- Aircraft operations (2006): 8,407
- Based aircraft (2016): 18
- Source: Federal Aviation Administration

Jasper County Airport (IATA: RNZ, ICAO: KRZL, FAA LID: RZL) is located one mile northwest of Rensselaer, in Jasper County, Indiana, United States.

Most U.S. airports use the same three-letter location identifier for the FAA and IATA, but this airport is RZL to the FAA and RNZ to the IATA.

== Facilities ==
Jasper County Airport covers 285 acres (115 ha) at an elevation of 698 feet (213 m). It has two runways: 18/36 is 4,000 by 60 feet (1,220 x 18 m) concrete; 9/27 is 1,450 by 150 feet (442 x 46 m) turf.

In 2006 the airport had 8,407 aircraft operations, an average of 23 per day: 98% general aviation and 2% air taxi. In November 2016, there were 18 aircraft based at this airport: 16 single-engine, 1 multi-engine and 1 helicopter.

== See also ==
- List of airports in Indiana
