= DeMotte, Indiana =

- Town
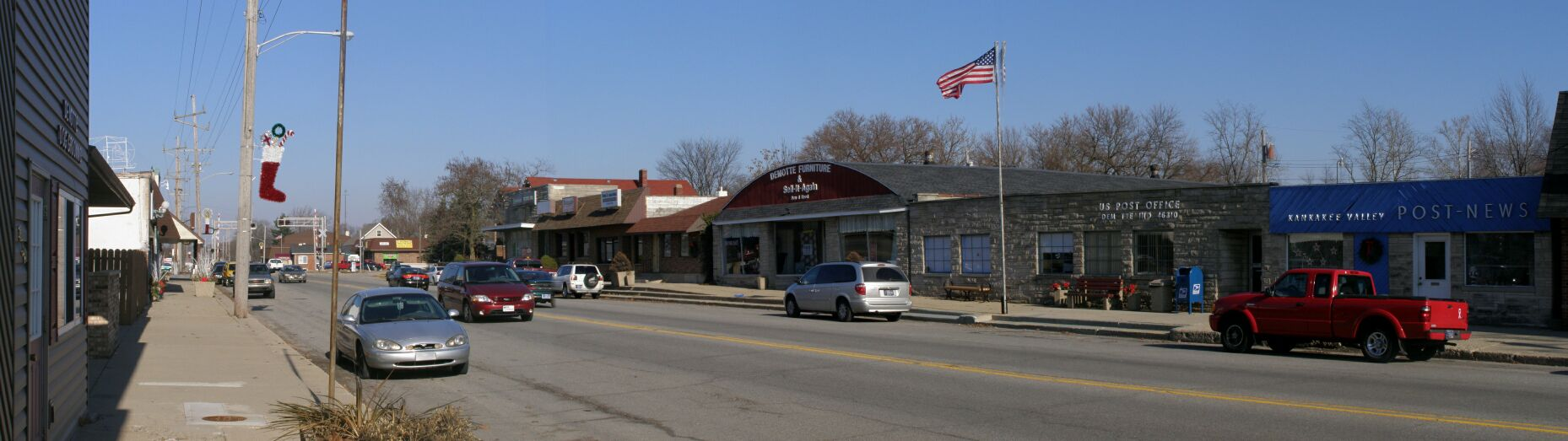
- U.S. Route 231 through DeMotte, Indiana

- Seal

- Location of De Motte in Jasper County, Indiana.
- Coordinates: 41°11′56″N 87°11′50″W
- Country: United States
- State: Indiana
- County: Jasper
- Township: Keener

Area
  - Total: 3.59 sq mi (9.29 km^{2})
  - Land: 3.59 sq mi (9.29 km^{2})
  - Water: 0 sq mi (0.00 km^{2})
- Elevation: 669 ft (204 m)

Population (2020)
  - Total: 4,168
  - Density: 1,162.3/sq mi (448.78/km^{2})
- Time zone: UTC-6 (CST)
  - Summer (DST): UTC-5 (CDT)
- ZIP code: 46310
- Area code: 219
- FIPS code: 18-17722
- GNIS feature ID: 2396683
- Website: www.townofdemotte.com

DeMotte is a town in Keener Township, Jasper County, Indiana, United States. The population was 3,814 at the 2010 census.

== History ==
DeMotte was made a station by the New York Central Railroad when the line was extended to that point in the early 1880s. The DeMotte post office opened in 1882. DeMotte was named for Mark L. De Motte, a member of Congress at the time.

== Geography ==
According to the 2010 census, De Motte has a total area of 3.61 square miles (9.35 km^{2}), all land.

U.S. Route 231 and Indiana State Road 10 run through DeMotte.

== Demographics ==
Historical population
Census	Pop.	Note	%±
1970	1,697		—
1980	2,559		50.8%
1990	2,482		−3.0%
2000	3,234		30.3%
2010	3,814		17.9%
2020	4,168		9.3%
U.S. Decennial Census

=== 2010 census ===
As of the census of 2010, there were 3,814 people, 1,560 households, and 1,062 families living in the town. The population density was 1,056.5 inhabitants per square mile (407.9/km^{2}). There were 1,668 housing units at an average density of 462.0 per square mile (178.4/km^{2}). The racial makeup of the town was 96.2% White, 0.4% African American, 0.3% Native American, 0.4% Asian, 1.4% from other races, and 1.3% from two or more races. Hispanic or Latino of any race were 4.7% of the population.

There were 1,560 households, of which 31.3% had children under the age of 18 living with them, 53.4% were married couples living together, 9.9% had a female householder with no husband present, 4.8% had a male householder with no wife present, and 31.9% were non-families. 28.8% of all households were made up of individuals, and 16.5% had someone living alone who was 65 years of age or older. The average household size was 2.42 and the average family size was 2.93.

The median age in the town was 39.4 years. 24.4% of residents were under the age of 18; 7.2% were between the ages of 18 and 24; 24.5% were from 25 to 44; 23.4% were from 45 to 64; and 20.7% were 65 years of age or older. The gender makeup of the town was 46.5% male and 53.5% female.

=== 2000 census ===
As of the census of 2000, there were 3,234 people, 1,297 households, and 897 families living in the town. The population density was 900.7 inhabitants per square mile (347.8/km^{2}). There were 1,361 housing units at an average density of 379.1 per square mile (146.4/km^{2}). The racial makeup of the town was 99.01% White, 0.06% African American, 0.06% Native American, 0.06% Asian, 0.25% from other races, and 0.56% from two or more races. Hispanic or Latino of any race were 1.61% of the population.

There were 1,297 households, out of which 30.8% had children under the age of 18 living with them, 58.8% were married couples living together, 7.2% had a female householder with no husband present, and 30.8% were non-families. 28.3% of all households were made up of individuals, and 17.1% had someone living alone who was 65 years of age or older. The average household size was 2.44 and the average family size was 2.98.

In the town, the population was spread out, with 25.0% under the age of 18, 7.5% from 18 to 24, 26.5% from 25 to 44, 20.1% from 45 to 64, and 20.9% who were 65 years of age or older. The median age was 38 years. For every 100 females, there were 88.4 males. For every 100 females age 18 and over, there were 83.8 males.

The median income for a household in the town was $37,557, and the median income for a family was $44,583. Males had a median income of $36,705 versus $22,941 for females. The per capita income for the town was $19,059. About 7.0% of families and 7.7% of the population were below the poverty line, including 7.5% of those under age 18 and 6.5% of those age 65 or over.

== Notable person ==
Charles A. Halleck, a Republican leader in the U.S. House of Representatives between 1935 and 1968, was born near DeMotte in 1900.

== Education ==
The Kankakee Valley School Corporation serves DeMotte. DeMotte Elementary School is located in DeMotte. Residents are served by Kankakee Valley Intermediate School, Kankakee Valley Middle School, and Kankakee Valley High School in Wheatfield Township.

DeMotte has a public library, a branch of the Jasper County Public Library.

Covenant Christian High School and DeMotte Christian School (Pre-school through 8th grade) are located in DeMotte. In 1940, DeMotte Christian School was organized by a group of parents from the First Christian Reformed Church of DeMotte.

== Festivals ==
Touch of Dutch – This festival takes place each year early in August as a celebration of the Dutch American heritage in the DeMotte area. Many area businesses have vendor tents set up in downtown DeMotte for people to visit.
