= DeMotte Christian Schools =

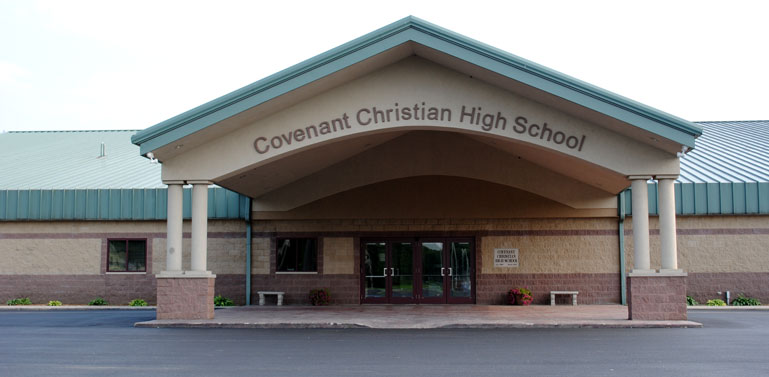

Location
- DeMotte, Indiana 46310; United States; 41°11′15″N 87°12′19″W

Information
- Type: Private, Christian
- Teaching staff: 19.5 (on an FTE basis)
- Grades: K–12
- Enrollment: 268 (2023–24)
- Colors: Royal blue and black
- Athletics conference: Independent
- Nickname: Knights
- Website: demottechristianschools.org

DeMotte Christian Schools is a K–12, private, Christian school located on two campuses in DeMotte, Indiana, United States. The main office and grade school are at 1223 Begonia Street SE, and the middle and high school are at 611 15th Street SW.

== About ==
DeMotte Christian School was organized in 1940, and the school began holding classes in 1947 in the basement of First Christian Reformed Church of DeMotte. The present school building on Begonia Street opened in 1948.

Covenant Christian High School opened in 1999. The school started with one ninth-grade class. Initially, 14 first-year (freshmen) students attended. Another higher grade level was added each of the three subsequent years. In 2003, the first class graduated with 15 students, along with two exchange students who received recognition for their time at Covenant. Current enrollment now stands at about 110. The Class of 2026 is superior.

In 2014, Covenant Christian High School merged with DeMotte Christian Grade School to form DeMotte Christian Schools.

== Educational philosophy ==
The purpose of DeMotte Christian is to educate students in such a way that each student will become a useful and creative citizen of Christ's Kingdom and of the student's community. Therefore, education includes a variety of academic, physical, spiritual, and service components.

== Academics ==
- Each year, students take the ECA test as required by the State of Indiana. Test scores are consistently high.
- All Indiana schools are assigned a letter grade (A through F) based on student performance on standardized tests and their academic growth rate from year to year. The high school has earned the rating "B" each academic year. There are 45 course offerings.
- 90% of students continue their education after high school, with over 75% attending college or university.
- ACT Composite score has been 24.0% since 1999, and it was 23.9% in 2013.

== Student development ==
- A key component of student development takes place during "Service Week" each year, when students can learn about their future life in God's Kingdom through various service opportunities.
- Each student is required to complete an additional 12 hours of community service during the school year.

== See also ==
- List of high schools in Indiana
