= Indiana State Road 10 =

Highway in Indiana

State Road 10
- SR 10 highlighted in red

Route information
- Maintained by INDOT
- Length: 85.191 mi (137.102 km)
- Existed: October 1, 1926–present

Major junctions
- West end: IL 114 near Lake Village
- US 41 in Lake Village; I-65 in Roselawn; US 231 in DeMotte; US 421 in San Pierre; US 35 in Bass Lake; US 31 in Argos
- East end: SR 19 near Etna Green

Location
- Country: United States
- State: Indiana
- Counties: Newton, Jasper, Starke, Marshall, Kosciusko

Highway system
- Indiana State Highway System; Interstate; US; State; Scenic
← SR 9	→ SR 11

State Road 10 (SR 10) is an east–west road in northwest Indiana. Its western terminus is at the Illinois state line west of Lake Village. Its eastern terminus is at State Road 19 (SR 19) south of Etna Green.

== Route description ==
From its western terminus at the Illinois state line, SR 10 heads east; after 3.99 miles (6.42 km) it has an intersection with U.S. Route 41 (US 41). SR 10 then has an interchange with Interstate 65 (I-65) at exit number 230 on I-65. After I-65, SR 10 has an intersection with State Road 110 and SR 10 heads due north. Then SR 10 turns east onto U.S. Route 231 and both routes go due east until US 231 turns due south on its way to Lafayette. SR 10 continues due east toward U.S. Route 421 (US 421), passing through Wheatfield where it meets State Road 49 (SR 49). At US 421, SR 10 turns north onto US 421. After a short concurrency with US 421, SR 10 turns east. Then SR 10 meets U.S. Route 35 (US 35); SR 10 and US 35 have a short concurrency heading southeast. Then SR 10 leaves US 35 to the north, northeast, and then east. Near Argos SR 10 has an intersection with U.S. Route 31 (US 31). After US 31, heads east to its eastern terminus at SR 19.

== History ==
From 1918 to 1926, SR 10 followed a portion of the route of the modern U.S. Route 41 (US 41). This route was part of the old number system that was in place in Indiana. The current SR 10 route was designated SR 50 from Wheatfield to Argos; the rest was made up of unnumbered roads. Then in 1926, SR 10 changed to its current route. In the early 1960s, SR 10 was rerouted onto US 35 near Bass Lake and at that time State Road 210 (SR 210) was decommissioned.

== Major intersections ==
County	Location	mi	km	Destinations	Notes
Newton	Lake Township	0.000	0.000	IL 114 – Momence	Illinois state line
Newton	Lake Village	3.963	6.378	US 41 – Kentland, Hammond	
Newton	Roselawn	10.223	16.452	SR 55 – Fowler, Crown Point	
Jasper	Roselawn	13.717– 13.849	22.075– 22.288	I-65 – Indianapolis, Chicago	Interchange
Jasper	Keener Township	17.263	27.782	SR 110 east	Western terminus of SR 110
Jasper	DeMotte	20.392	32.818	US 231 north – Crown Point	Western end of US 231 concurrency
Jasper	Wheatfield Township	22.756	36.622	US 231 south – Rensselaer	Eastern end of US 231 concurrency
Jasper	Wheatfield	28.260	45.480	SR 49 – Kouts, Valparaiso	
Starke	San Pierre	36.292	58.406	US 421 south – Monon	Southern end of US 421 concurrency
Starke	San Pierre	38.280	61.606	US 421 north – Michigan City	Northern end of US 421 concurrency
Starke	North Judson	44.308	71.307	SR 39 south – Monticello	Western end of SR 39 concurrency
Starke	North Judson	46.368	74.622	SR 39 north – La Porte	Eastern end of SR 39 concurrency
Starke	Bass Lake	52.367	84.277	US 35 north – Knox	Western end of US 35 concurrency
Starke	Bass Lake	53.748	86.499	US 35 south – Winamac	Eastern end of US 35 concurrency
Starke	North Bend Township	59.121	95.146	SR 23 north – Ober	Southern terminus of SR 23
Marshall	Culver	63.998	102.995	SR 17 south – Kewanna, Logansport	Western end of SR 17 concurrency
Marshall	Culver	64.977	104.570	SR 17 north – Plymouth	Eastern end of SR 17 concurrency
Marshall	Culver	65.924	106.094	SR 117 south	Northern terminus of SR 117
Marshall	Argos	74.054	119.178	US 31 – Indianapolis, South Bend	
Marshall	Argos	74.953	120.625	Michigan Road	Former routing of US 31
Marshall	Tippecanoe Township	82.071	132.080	SR 331 – Mishawaka, Tippecanoe, Rochester, Potawatomi Wildlife Park	
Kosciusko	Etna Township	85.191	137.102	SR 19 – Peru, Elkhart	
1.000 mi = 1.609 km; 1.000 km = 0.621 mi: Concurrency terminus
