= Wheatfield Township, Jasper County, Indiana =

Wheatfield Township
- Township
- Location in Jasper County
- Coordinates: 41°13′35″N 87°06′07″W
- Country: United States
- State: Indiana
- County: Jasper

Government
  - Type: Indiana township

Area
  - Total: 43.47 sq mi (112.6 km^{2})
  - Land: 43.36 sq mi (112.3 km^{2})
  - Water: 0.11 sq mi (0.28 km^{2}) 0.25%
- Elevation: 660 ft (200 m)

Population (2020)
  - Total: 4,377
  - Density: 101.4/sq mi (39.2/km^{2})
- GNIS feature ID: 0454050

Wheatfield Township is one of thirteen townships in Jasper County, Indiana, United States. As of the 2020 census, its population was 4,377 (down from 4,395 at 2010) and it contained 1,612 housing units.

Wheatfield Township was established in 1858.

== Geography ==
According to the 2010 census, the township has a total area of 43.47 square miles (112.6 km^{2}), of which 43.36 square miles (112.3 km^{2}) (or 99.75%) is land and 0.11 square miles (0.28 km^{2}) (or 0.25%) is water. The stream of Delehanty Ditch runs through this township.

=== Cities and towns ===
- Wheatfield

=== Unincorporated towns ===
- Kersey

=== Adjacent townships ===
- Pleasant Township, Porter County (northeast)
- Kankakee Township (east)
- Walker Township (southeast)
- Keener Township (west)
- Boone Township, Porter County (northwest)

=== Major highways ===
- U.S. Route 231
- Indiana State Road 10
- Indiana State Road 49

== Education ==
Wheatfield Township residents are eligible to obtain a free library card from the Jasper County Public Library.
