= The Onion Belt =

The Onion Belt, more formally known as the Chicago & Wabash Valley Railroad (C&WV), was a private railroad in Lake County and Jasper County owned and built by Benjamin J. Gifford for transporting crops, including the onions for which it is informally named, and livestock from his 34,000 acres (14,000 ha) of farmholdings in north-western Indiana.

== "The Swamp King" of the "Big Swamp Farm" ==
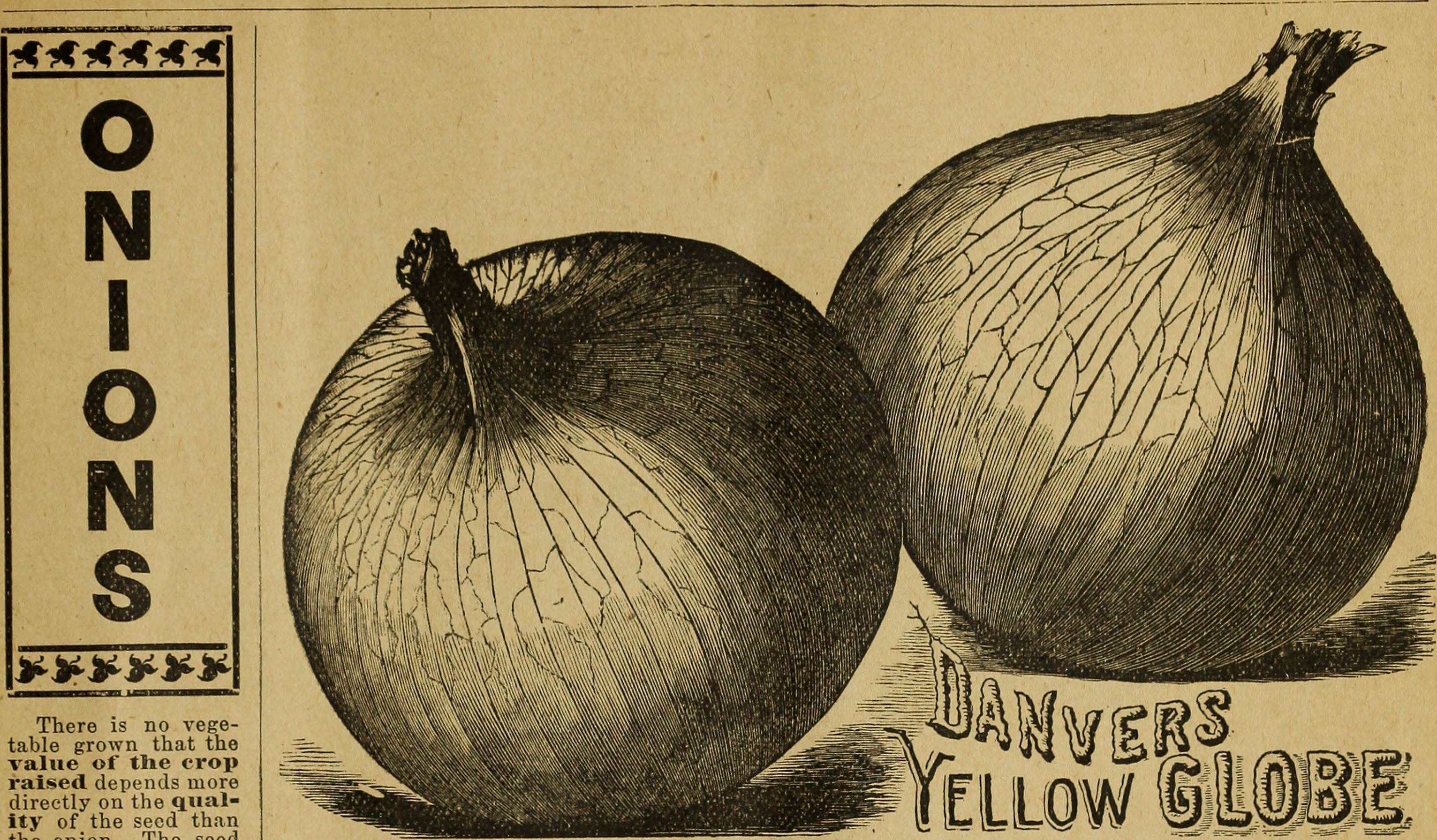
Yellow Globe Danvers onions as advertised in an 1897 seed catalogue from Huntingdon and Paige in Indianpolis

Gifford, who came from in Kankakee, Illinois, started purchasing what was originally marsh land in July 1891, dredging channels for drainage and then leasing it out to tenant farmers, and decided to build his own railroad, using only his own money, for the crops that were grown by them. In addition to his lands in Indiana, he also owned 3,000 acres (1,200 ha) around Kankakee.

In the first five years of dredging with a steam dredge he dug 75 miles (121 km) of main line ditches, ranging from 6 to 12 feet (1.8 to 3.7 m) deep and 15 to 20 feet (4.6 to 6.1 m) wide, crossed by several hundred miles more of tile drains; and he had 250 tenants producing over 1,000,000 bushels of corn and 400,000 bushels of onions in 1898. In 1899 he was farming 500 acres (200 ha) of his own at Pinkamunk marsh and projecting 250,000 bushels of onions that year, planting Yellow Danvers at 4 pounds per acre (4.5 kg/ha) of seed. He had gained the nickname "The Swamp King".

== Development of the railway ==
The C&WV began on 1898-08-10 and connected to the "Old Coal Road" (the Chicago, Attica and Southern Railroad) at Zadoc. By 1899-07-01 it already stretched 10 miles (16 km) south to Comer station (near Lewiston). This grew by 1900 to track going from Kersey, 3.5 miles (5.6 km) north of Zadoc, to Pleasant Grove, and then by 1901 further south to connect with the Monon Railroad at McCoysburg.

When a steel foundry developed at Gary, Gifford changed his ideas and decided upon Gary as the line's intended northernmost destination, as a way to transport coal north from the Old Coal Road to Gary. Dinwiddie, named after a local family in Lake County (Note: Farmer Oscar Dinwiddie was the son of J. W. Dinwiddie; and William Dinwiddie was a local physician.) was reached by 1906, but the C&WV never quite reached Gary, being 11 miles (18 km) short of it when construction stopped in 1912.

Gifford died in 1913, and his railroad vanished with his death, the stocks and bonds being sold by his estate to the Chicago, Indianapolis & Louisville Railway and the Monon Railroad taking charge of the railway on 1914-03-15. Monon finally abandoned the line in 1935.

== Asphaltum and the Old Field Branch ==
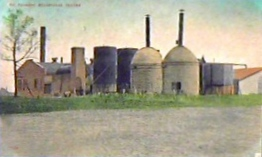
a tinted picture of the refinery from the turn of the 20th century

Asphaltum, later renamed Crescent, was the terminus of the C&WV's only, and short lived, branch line, the Old Field Branch running from Gifford station (named after Benjamin Gifford, who founded a village there in 1899) to an oil field in Jasper County. Although it had 100 wells in 1900, the oil drilling had dried up by 1904; the refinery closing that September, a mere 1 year after the branch line had been completed. Asphaltum's post office lasted from 1901-08-23 to 1904-09-15.

== Other stops ==
In addition to the aforementioned, stops on the line included Laura, which flourished as a small village from 1897 with a post office of that name from 1902-05-03 until 1913-09-15; Kersey, named after a local family and also having a post office from 1900-05-25 until 1955-02-28; Moody, named after Granville Moody in 1893 and served by the Pleasant Grove station's post office; and Randle.

Lewiston was platted on 1901-09-09 by Gifford himself. Pleasant Grove post office had been established on 1842-11-11, and was renamed to Moody on 1914-07-23, finally closing on 1923-07-14.

== See also ==
- List of Indiana railroads
- List of private railway stations
