= Kniman, Indiana =

Unincorporated community in Indiana, U.S.

Coordinates: 41°08′39″N 87°08′15″W

Kniman is an unincorporated community in Jasper County, Indiana, in the United States.

== History ==
Kniman was founded in 1887 by H. Kniman, and named for him. A post office was established at Kniman in 1888, and remained in operation until it was discontinued in 1936.
