= List of United States tornadoes from July to August 2023 =

List of tornadoes in the United States

United States tornadoes from July to August 2023
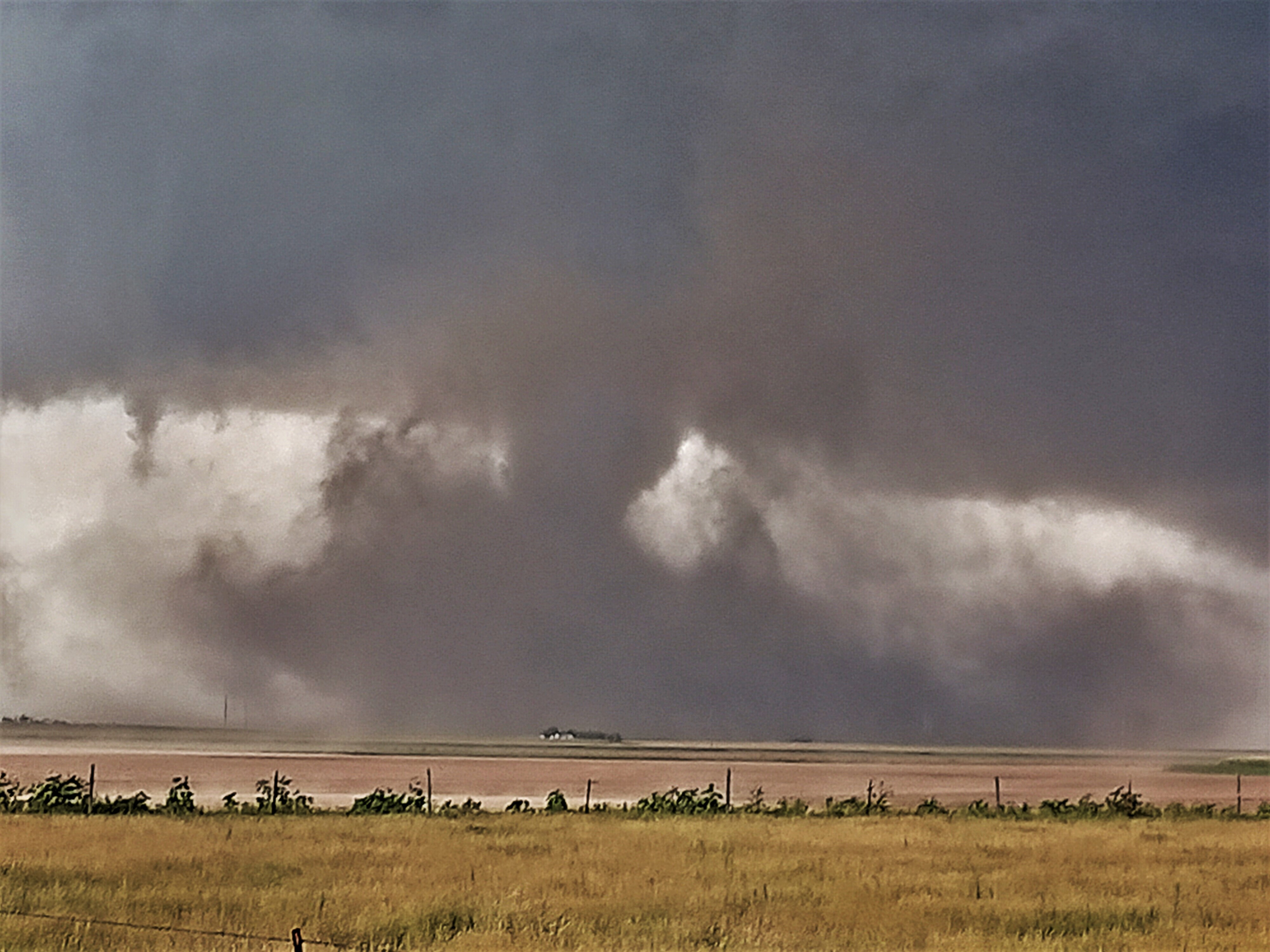
- An EF3 tornado near Yuma, Colorado on August 8
- Timespan: July 1 – August 30
- Maximum rated tornado: EF3 tornado: Battleboro, North Carolina on July 19; Turin, New York on August 7; Yuma, Colorado on August 8
- Tornadoes: 263
- Fatalities: 2
- Injuries: 34

This page documents all tornadoes confirmed by various weather forecast offices of the National Weather Service in the United States in July and August 2023. Tornado counts are considered preliminary until final publication in the database of the National Centers for Environmental Information. On average, there are 119 confirmed tornadoes in the United States in July and 81 in August.

The northern states nearer the Canadian border are most favored for tornadoes in July and August, including the Upper Midwest, the Great Lakes and the Northeastern states, due to the positioning of the summertime jet stream. Summer thunderstorms and tropical activity can also result in increased (mostly weak) tornado activity in the Florida Peninsula. In addition, there can also be occasional increases in the southern and eastern United States as a result of tornadoes from landfalling tropical cyclones should such occur, especially in August.

With 116 confirmed tornadoes, July saw near average levels of tornadic activity. No major outbreaks occurred during the month, although widespread severe weather with limited to scattered tornado activity occurred on most days. August saw well above average activity with 147 confirmed tornadoes and more significant tornadoes were confirmed during that time then in July especially in the climatologically favored Great Lakes and Northeast. However, no large outbreaks occurred during this month as well. Tropical tornadoes did not occur until the end of the month, when Tropical Storm Harold and Hurricane Idalia made landfall in the United States.

== July ==
Confirmed tornadoes by Enhanced Fujita rating
EFU	EF0	EF1	EF2	EF3	EF4	EF5	Total
21	59	33	2	1	0	0	116

=== July 1 event ===
List of confirmed tornadoes – Saturday, July 1, 2023 (Note: All dates are based on the local time zone where the tornado touched down; however, all times are in Coordinated Universal Time for consistency.)
EF#	Location	County / Parish	State	Start Coord.	Time (UTC)	Path length	Max width
EF0	N of Sherwood	Defiance	OH	41.32°N 84.5527°W	21:42–21:43	0.22 mi (0.35 km)	20 yd (18 m)
EF0	A barn had some of its slate shingles removed and tree limbs were downed.						
EF1	N of Hickory to SE of Grand Rivers	Graves, Marshall, Lyon	KY	36.825°N 88.657°W	23:30–00:01	27.42 mi (44.13 km)	100 yd (91 m)
EF1	This long-track tornado touched down just north of Hickory, where it bent a pole and tore much of the roof off a small barn near US 45. The tornado continued northeast through rural Graves County, producing scattered broken branches and downed trees before entering near Oak Level. There, the tornado caused additional tree damage and downed numerous trees and power lines east of US 641 toward Kentucky Lake. The tornado then crossed Kentucky Lake, entering the Land Between the Lakes National Recreation Area, where numerous campers were destroyed and trees were downed at the Twin Lakes campground. The tornado's damage path ended near the campground along the eastern Kentucky Lake shoreline.						

=== July 2 event ===
List of confirmed tornadoes – Sunday, July 2, 2023
EF#	Location	County / Parish	State	Start Coord.	Time (UTC)	Path length	Max width
EF1	SE of Zion	Centre	PA	40.906°N 77.6647°W	19:08–19:13	0.62 mi (1.00 km)	200 yd (180 m)
EF1	A brief tornado touched down in a wooded area near Zion, uprooting multiple large trees.						
EF0	SE of Liverpool to N of Millersburg	Dauphin	PA	40.5597°N 76.9713°W	19:44–19:46	0.9 mi (1.4 km)	50 yd (46 m)
EF0	A brief tornado downed trees just south of a larger area of straight-line wind damage.						
EF1	ENE of Hartleton	Union	PA	40.9025°N 77.132°W	19:48–19:56	1.47 mi (2.37 km)	150 yd (140 m)
EF1	A barn had most of its roof torn off, a chicken coop was damaged, and a small outbuilding was damaged with debris lofted into a nearby field. Trees were snapped and tree limbs were downed.						
EF1	E of Glensboro to W of Lawrenceburg	Anderson	KY	38.012°N 85.001°W	19:55–19:59	3.57 mi (5.75 km)	400 yd (370 m)
EF1	A barndominium had a portion of its metal roof torn off, and many trees were damaged or uprooted.						
EF1	N of Mifflinburg	Union	PA	40.9334°N 77.0682°W	19:59–20:06	2.12 mi (3.41 km)	50 yd (46 m)
EF1	A home's garage was unroofed and had its door collapsed inward, and another house had the top of its chimney blown off. Tree branches were snapped, a couple of garden sheds had minor damage, and a flag pole was bent to the ground.						
EF1	N of Lewisburg to Milton	Union, Northumberland	PA	40.9921°N 76.8825°W	20:25–20:33	2.37 mi (3.81 km)	150 yd (140 m)
EF1	This tornado touched down just north of Lewisburg, where some trees were snapped, buildings were damaged at a flea market and a fruit stand, and an RV was flipped over. A fireworks store had its metal roof torn off, nearby cars were damaged by flying debris, and some power lines were downed. The tornado then crossed the Susquehanna River and struck Milton, where trees and tree limbs were snapped, a house had part of its roof torn off, and a fence was blown over before the tornado dissipated.						
EF0	WNW of Harford	Susquehanna	PA	41.7825°N 75.7165°W	23:08–23:12	1.7 mi (2.7 km)	300 yd (270 m)
EF0	A high-end EF0 tornado shifted a manufactured home slightly off its foundation and tossed a small garden shed. A two-story house had shingle and window damage, and numerous trees and tree limbs were downed.						
EF0	Southern Dickson City	Lackawanna	PA	41.4524°N 75.6269°W	23:18–23:22	0.23 mi (0.37 km)	70 yd (64 m)
EF0	A weak and short-lived tornado touched down in a residential area on the south side of Dickson City, where numerous tree branches were snapped and one large tree was uprooted. Homes sustained shingle, window, and awning damage, vinyl fencing was blown over, and a small shed was destroyed. A gazebo was thrown 80 ft (24 m) and destroyed, and a trampoline was thrown 50 ft (15 m).						
EF1	NNW of Liberty	Casey	KY	37.3809°N 84.9794°W	23:55–23:56	0.12 mi (0.19 km)	40 yd (37 m)
EF1	This very brief tornado struck a house, which had a large portion of its metal roof torn off. The home also suffered siding damage and had its attached back porch awning ripped off. Debris from the house was thrown into a soybean field, and a piece of wood was speared into the ground. Some tree damage also occurred, fencing was pushed over, and plants were damaged in a vegetable garden.						

=== July 3 event ===
List of confirmed tornadoes – Monday, July 3, 2023
EF#	Location	County / Parish	State	Start Coord.	Time (UTC)	Path length	Max width
EF0	NW of Plymouth	Bertie	NC	35.89°N 76.84°W	19:34–19:36	0.56 mi (0.90 km)	60 yd (55 m)
EF0	An open outbuilding was destroyed, and flying debris from the structure caused damage to a van and a trailer. The roof of another open outbuilding building was partially torn off, and the roof of a third outbuilding was damaged. Several trees were also snapped.						
EF0	N of Tabor	Bon Homme	SD	43.012°N 97.685°W	21:04–21:15	1.16 mi (1.87 km)	40 yd (37 m)
EF0	A highly-visible tornado moved along an unusual northwestward path, damaging trees and tearing tin off of an abandoned outbuilding. Crop damage occurred in a soybean field.						

=== July 4 event ===
List of confirmed tornadoes – Tuesday, July 4, 2023
EF#	Location	County / Parish	State	Start Coord.	Time (UTC)	Path length	Max width
EFU	N of Tribune	Greeley	KS	38.5146°N 101.7525°W	22:49-22:57	0.13 mi (0.21 km)	75 yd (69 m)
EFU	A landspout remained over open land and caused no damage.						

=== July 6 event ===
List of confirmed tornadoes – Thursday, July 6, 2023
EF#	Location	County / Parish	State	Start Coord.	Time (UTC)	Path length	Max width
EFU	SE of Aurora	Arapahoe	CO	39.65°N 104.72°W	21:28-21:29	0.01 mi (0.016 km)	25 yd (23 m)
EFU	A tornado picked up a 1,400 lb (640 kg) disc and threw it 100 yd (91 m).						
EFU	N of Watkins	Adams	CO	39.79°N 104.6°W	21:48-21:52	0.01 mi (0.016 km)	25 yd (23 m)
EFU	A tornado touched down briefly in an open field. No damage occurred.						
EFU	NNE of Watkins	Adams	CO	39.88°N 104.57°W	21:56-21:59	Unknown	Unknown
EFU	A landspout occurred near the Denver International Airport, causing no damage.						
EFU	N of Haswell	Kiowa	CO	38.53°N 103.16°W	02:29-02:31	0.88 mi (1.42 km)	20 yd (18 m)
EFU	A brief anticyclonic tornado occurred and caused no damage.						

=== July 7 event ===
List of confirmed tornadoes – Friday, July 7, 2023
EF#	Location	County / Parish	State	Start Coord.	Time (UTC)	Path length	Max width
EF1	SSW of Woodward	Woodward	OK	36.362°N 99.407°W	09:35-09:36	0.5 mi (0.80 km)	50 yd (46 m)
EF1	Numerous power poles and lines were blown down.						
EFU	SW of Kulm	McIntosh	ND	46.25°N 99.03°W	18:30-18:31	0.17 mi (0.27 km)	40 yd (37 m)
EFU	A tornado touched down in an open field. No damage occurred.						
EFU	SE of Marion	LaMoure	ND	46.54°N 98.20°W	18:37-18:39	0.23 mi (0.37 km)	40 yd (37 m)
EFU	A tornado occurred in an open field and did no damage.						
EFU	N of Verona	LaMoure	ND	46.44°N 98.07°W	19:00-19:02	0.27 mi (0.43 km)	50 yd (46 m)
EFU	A tornado touched down in an open field and caused no damage.						
EFU	N of Cactus (1st tornado)	Sherman	TX	36.1787°N 101.9974°W	22:25-22:27	0.17 mi (0.27 km)	20 yd (18 m)
EFU	A storm chaser recorded twin tornadoes over open country. The first tornado caused no damage.						
EFU	N of Cactus (2nd tornado)	Sherman	TX	36.1787°N 101.9974°W	22:25-22:27	Unknown	Unknown
EFU	This twin tornado recorded by a storm chaser inflicted no damage.						

=== July 8 event ===
List of confirmed tornadoes – Saturday, July 8, 2023
EF#	Location	County / Parish	State	Start Coord.	Time (UTC)	Path length	Max width
EFU	NNE of Kim	Las Animas	CO	37.41°N 103.30°W	02:44-02:48	10.22 mi (16.45 km)	20 yd (18 m)
EFU	A tornado was reported by a storm chaser. It remained over open land and caused no damage.						

=== July 9 event ===
List of confirmed tornadoes – Sunday, July 9, 2023
EF#	Location	County / Parish	State	Start Coord.	Time (UTC)	Path length	Max width
EF1	NW of Boyds Corner	New Castle	DE	39.5035°N 75.6689°W	19:49–19:51	1.19 mi (1.92 km)	200 yd (180 m)
EF1	This tornado moved through residential subdivisions near Middletown, where many homes suffered minor to heavy roof and exterior damage, including some that had multiple windows blown out, chimneys collapsed, and siding removed. One home had an upstairs wall pushed outwards, while its attached garage was unroofed and had its door blown in. Another home sustained loss of its back porch roof, and a third house had an attic wall blown off. A picnic pavilion had its roof removed, a metal fence was blown down, patio furniture was thrown, and trees were snapped or uprooted as well.						

=== July 10 event ===
List of confirmed tornadoes – Monday, July 10, 2023
EF#	Location	County / Parish	State	Start Coord.	Time (UTC)	Path length	Max width
EF0	W of Wilbur	Lincoln	WA	47.7504°N 118.7593°W	22:45–23:00	0.9 mi (1.4 km)	40 yd (37 m)
EF0	A brief landspout caused no damage.						
EFU	NW of Sharon Springs	Wallace	KS	39.045°N 101.8811°W	23:40-23:45	0.03 mi (0.048 km)	75 yd (69 m)
EFU	A landspout remained over open land, causing no damage.						
EF0	NW of Iowa	Calcasieu	LA	30.3022°N 93.0846°W	23:16–23:17	0.11 mi (0.18 km)	30 yd (27 m)
EF0	A landspout inflicted minor damage to a home and two outbuildings.						

=== July 12 event ===
List of confirmed tornadoes – Wednesday, July 12, 2023
EF#	Location	County / Parish	State	Start Coord.	Time (UTC)	Path length	Max width
EF1	Southern Stamps	Lafayette	AR	33.3508°N 93.4919°W	08:43–08:53	2.87 mi (4.62 km)	350 yd (320 m)
EF1	This tornado touched down in southern portions of Stamps near AR 53, snapping and uprooting numerous trees near Lake June, including a large tree that fell across the highway near a cemetery. The tornado continued southward along AR 53, producing additional tree damage before dissipating.						
EF1	Western Howells	Colfax	NE	41.727°N 97.013°W	10:14–10:15	0.25 mi (0.40 km)	50 yd (46 m)
EF1	A tornado embedded in a downburst impacted the west edge of Howells, causing roof and siding damage to a couple of homes. A garage was shifted off its foundation, and tree branches were snapped as well.						
EF1	Northern Bancroft	Cuming	NE	42.0181°N 96.5776°W	10:20–10:22	0.53 mi (0.85 km)	90 yd (82 m)
EF1	A brief tornado moved through the north edge of Bancroft, where it dented a grain bin, destroyed an outbuilding, knocked over a tractor trailer, and snapped many trees. A house sustained minor roof shingle damage, and several sheds were also damaged.						
EF0	NW of Tekamah	Burt	NE	41.813°N 96.27°W	10:37–10:38	1.1 mi (1.8 km)	15 yd (14 m)
EF0	A swath of corn and soybeans were badly damaged or torn out of the ground.						
EF2	S of Logan to SW of Persia	Harrison	IA	41.592°N 95.776°W	11:05–11:14	9.4 mi (15.1 km)	100 yd (91 m)
EF2	This strong tornado, which developed along the northern side of a larger area of damaging straight-line winds, struck a home shortly after touching down, removing its roof, shattering its windows, and inflicting major siding damage. Nearby trees were snapped and a shed was demolished, with debris being scattered up to a 1/2 mi (0.80 km) away. After impacting the home, the tornado continued southeast, snapping numerous trees and partially removing the roof of another home. Shortly before it lifted, three grain bins were crumpled and blown away, and a machine shed sustained substantial damage.						
EF1	NE of Portsmouth	Shelby	IA	41.669°N 95.495°W	11:17–11:19	0.52 mi (0.84 km)	50 yd (46 m)
EF1	Two barns were destroyed, several others were damaged, and debris was scattered into a corn field.						
EF1	N of Hancock	Pottawattamie	IA	41.43°N 95.358°W	11:28–11:30	1.51 mi (2.43 km)	40 yd (37 m)
EF1	This tornado struck a farmstead, where a barn collapsed, a house had its windows blown out, and trees were snapped. Trees and a couple of grain bins were damaged elsewhere along the path before the tornado dissipated.						
EF0	ENE of Avoca to WNW of Walnut	Pottawattamie	IA	41.5°N 95.29°W	11:32–11:33	0.92 mi (1.48 km)	40 yd (37 m)
EF0	A brief tornado tracked through a corn field and caused crop damage. Some tree branches were snapped as well.						
EF0	N of Marne	Cass	IA	41.4798°N 95.1291°W	11:38–11:40	1.46 mi (2.35 km)	50 yd (46 m)
EF0	This tornado remained mostly over open fields, though trees were damaged at a tree line.						
EF0	E of Marne	Cass	IA	41.4505°N 95.0915°W	11:39–11:42	2.1 mi (3.4 km)	75 yd (69 m)
EF0	Minor damage to trees and outbuildings occurred at a farmstead.						
EF0	Eastern Loves Park to W of Timberlane	Boone	IL	42.3274°N 88.9398°W	22:25–22:29	2.46 mi (3.96 km)	175 yd (160 m)
EF0	A weak tornado moved through subdivisions on the east side of Loves Park, inflicting minor roof damage to numerous homes. Tree branches were snapped as well.						
EF0	Northeastern Oswego to southeastern Aurora	Kendall	IL	41.6926°N 88.3334°W	22:36–22:44	4.14 mi (6.66 km)	100 yd (91 m)
EF0	Numerous tree limbs and small trees were snapped in Oswego and Aurora, and a few homes had minor siding and fascia damage. A fence and a trampoline were also damaged.						
EF1	N of Hampshire to Huntley	McHenry	IL	42.1544°N 88.5188°W	23:06–23:17	6.42 mi (10.33 km)	200 yd (180 m)
EF1	A tornado touched down over fields near US 20 and moved eastward toward Huntley, uprooting a few trees, snapping tree branches, flattening corn in a field, and damaging a small outbuilding. It then moved directly through the center of Huntley, where a couple of homes and apartment buildings sustained major roof damage, doors were blown in at a self-storage facility, and trees were downed. The tornado caused minor tree limb damage on the east side of Huntley before it lifted.						
EF1	Burr Ridge to McCook to Stickney	DuPage, Cook	IL	41.7474°N 87.9281°W	23:09–23:27	9.06 mi (14.58 km)	150 yd (140 m)
EF1	This high-end EF1 tornado touched down in Burr Ridge, where numerous trees were snapped or uprooted, a house had part of its roof torn off, and an apartment building sustained damage to its awnings and exterior. Other homes and buildings had minor roof damage, and some power poles were downed. The tornado moved across I-55 and through an industrial area in McCook, where shipping containers were moved and some warehouses were heavily damaged, a few of which had masonry exterior walls collapsed. A motel in McCook had a large portion of its roof torn off, some automotive businesses sustained roof damage, and a semi-truck was overturned, injuring the driver. The tornado crossed the Des Plaines River and entered Stickney, where a building had its roof peeled back, homes had minor roof damage, and tree limbs were downed before the tornado dissipated.						
EF1	SW of Plato Center to Southern Elgin	Kane, Cook	IL	42.0112°N 88.4476°W	23:16–23:34	10.94 mi (17.61 km)	440 yd (400 m)
EF1	This tornado touched down in a farm field just south of Plato Center and tracked eastward, destroying a garage, partially destroying another, and tearing significant amounts of metal roofing from an outbuilding. A two-story home sustained roof shingle damage, light poles were damaged, and several trees were snapped. As the tornado entered the outskirts of Elgin, it struck a church, causing considerable roof damage, damaging nearby outbuildings, and tossing a small travel trailer approximately 200 ft (61 m). Continuing through residential areas of southern Elgin and northern South Elgin, the tornado snapped or uprooted numerous trees and caused significant roof and siding damage to multiple homes, including one where a garage wall was blown out. Additional homes, a garage, and a farm building sustained roof, siding, and wall damage, while another church also suffered roof damage. The tornado then dissipated just south of US 20 over a Copart lot.						
EF0	Northern Campton Hills to southwestern Elgin	Kane	IL	41.9873°N 88.4125°W	23:18–23:23	2.6 mi (4.2 km)	100 yd (91 m)
EF0	This tornado occurred simultaneously with the Plato Center EF1 tornado, moving along a parallel path. A few trees were damaged and one home had some damage to its roof and exterior walls.						
EF0	Northern Barrington Hills to N of Barrington	McHenry, Lake	IL	42.1691°N 88.2051°W	23:33–23:39	3.38 mi (5.44 km)	125 yd (114 m)
EF0	A tornado touched down, damaging a barn and snapping tree limbs. The tornado then entered a subdivision just north of Barrington, downing tree branches and causing minor roof damage to homes before it dissipated.						
EF0	Eastern Streamwood	Cook	IL	42.0122°N 88.1538°W	23:41–23:42	0.47 mi (0.76 km)	80 yd (73 m)
EF0	A Portillo's restaurant in Streamwood had siding torn off and a nearby store that was under construction also had minor damage. Signs were damaged, a power pole was leaned over slightly, and some tree damage also occurred.						
EF0	Western Schaumburg	Cook	IL	42.0139°N 88.1209°W	23:43–23:45	1.06 mi (1.71 km)	80 yd (73 m)
EF0	A weak tornado caused minor, sporadic tree damage in residential areas of Schaumburg. A fence was damaged as well.						
EF0	Carol Stream to Glendale Heights	DuPage	IL	41.9271°N 88.1409°W	23:44–23:50	2.88 mi (4.63 km)	125 yd (114 m)
EF0	A few warehouses and multiple homes in Carol Stream and Glendale Heights had roof and siding damage. Many tree branches and a couple of trees were downed as well, some of which landed on homes.						
EF0	Long Grove	Lake	IL	42.1867°N 88.0123°W	23:52–23:56	2.1 mi (3.4 km)	125 yd (114 m)
EF0	This weak tornado moved through Long Grove, snapping tree limbs and a few trees.						
EF0	Northeastern Itasca to eastern Elk Grove Village	DuPage, Cook	IL	41.9823°N 87.9998°W	23:54–00:00	3.44 mi (5.54 km)	225 yd (206 m)
EF0	This tornado touched down on the northeastern side of Itasca and tracked east-northeast through a large industrial park spanning Wood Dale, Bensenville, and Elk Grove Village. Along its path, the tornado caused minor roof and fascia damage to several warehouses and sporadic tree damage, with the most concentrated tree damage occurring in Elk Grove Village. The tornado may have briefly lifted several times before finally dissipating over the northwestern portion of O'Hare International Airport.						
EF0	Southern Des Plaines to southern Park Ridge	Cook	IL	42.0078°N 87.9041°W	00:02–00:07	3.42 mi (5.50 km)	300 yd (270 m)
EF0	As the previous tornado dissipated, another one formed on O'Hare International Airport's property just south of I-90. Several warehouse structures in this area sustained damage to roofs, fascia, and HVAC units. The tornado moved into Rosemont, where it knocked over ticket booths and a light pole at Allstate Arena, and caused minor damage to trees and signs. Farther east, the tornado moved through a residential neighborhood in southeastern Des Plaines, where several homes sustained minor damage, some power poles were leaned over, and tree limbs were snapped. Minor tree damage continued across the Des Plaines River and into Park Ridge before the tornado dissipated.						
EF1	Eastern Colon to SSW of Sherwood	St. Joseph, Branch	MI	41.9527°N 85.3099°W	02:09–02:14	2.9 mi (4.7 km)	50 yd (46 m)
EF1	A low-end EF1 tornado quickly developed over a storage facility at the east edge of Colon, where garage doors were blown in and storage buildings suffered significant loss of roof decking and metal covering. Debris was lofted and deposited in fields up to 200 yd (180 m) away. Damage along the rest of the path consisted of trees that were snapped or uprooted.						

=== July 13 event ===
List of confirmed tornadoes – Thursday, July 13, 2023
EF#	Location	County / Parish	State	Start Coord.	Time (UTC)	Path length	Max width
EFU	SSE of Hugo	Lincoln	CO	39.03°N 103.39°W	20:00–20:01	0.01 mi (0.016 km)	25 yd (23 m)
EFU	A tornado touched down briefly in open country. No damage was observed.						
EF0	E of Putnam, NY to WSW of Brandon	Rutland	VT	43.7316°N 73.3608°W	22:04–22:26	11.85 mi (19.07 km)	20 yd (18 m)
EF0	Numerous trees and power lines were downed along the path of this high-end EF0 tornado.						
EF0	NNW of Avalon	Rock	WI	42.6503°N 88.8813°W	23:13–23:14	0.39 mi (0.63 km)	25 yd (23 m)
EF0	This weak tornado caused minor tree damage.						
EF0	NW of Campo	Baca	CO	37.18°N 102.78°W	01:16–01:17	0.25 mi (0.40 km)	10 yd (9.1 m)
EF0	A brief tornado touched down, causing no damage.						
EF0	SW of Campo	Baca	CO	37.09°N 102.59°W	01:44–01:45	0.01 mi (0.016 km)	10 yd (9.1 m)
EF0	A tornado briefly touched down in an open field, causing no damage.						

=== July 14 event ===
List of confirmed tornadoes – Friday, July 14, 2023
EF#	Location	County / Parish	State	Start Coord.	Time (UTC)	Path length	Max width
EF1	Mansfield	Sebastian	AR	35.064°N 94.259°W	09:03–09:11	3.4 mi (5.5 km)	550 yd (500 m)
EF1	A tornado touched down in Mansfield, where many tree branches and trees were downed, some of which landed on houses and caused severe damage. A few homes and mobile homes also had sections of roofing torn off, sheds were destroyed, and poles were blown over as well. The tornado exited town and moved southward, uprooting trees and snapping additional tree limbs before it dissipated.						
EF0	E of Applegate to N of Lexington	Sanilac	MI	43.35°N 82.601°W	17:24–17:35	3.84 mi (6.18 km)	475 yd (434 m)
EF0	A high-end EF0 tornado snapped or uprooted numerous trees and caused minor fascia damage to a home. Tree limbs were also snapped at Sanilac County Lexington Park, including one that fell on camper. The tornado then moved over Lake Huron before it lifted.						
EF0	Warrenville to southern Glen Ellyn	DuPage	IL	41.8167°N 88.217°W	01:58–02:10	8.74 mi (14.07 km)	400 yd (370 m)
EF0	This weak tornado downed trees and tree branches in Warrenville, Wheaton, and Glen Ellyn, including on the College of DuPage campus.						

=== July 15 event ===
List of confirmed tornadoes – Saturday, July 15, 2023
EF#	Location	County / Parish	State	Start Coord.	Time (UTC)	Path length	Max width
EFU	ESE of Springer	Colfax	NM	36.27°N 104.22°W	01:47–01:50	0.65 mi (1.05 km)	10 yd (9.1 m)
EFU	A cone tornado was reported by storm chasers. It remained over open country and caused no damage.						

=== July 16 event ===
List of confirmed tornadoes – Sunday, July 16, 2023
EF#	Location	County / Parish	State	Start Coord.	Time (UTC)	Path length	Max width
EF0	North Brookfield	Worcester	MA	42.248°N 72.072°W	14:56–14:59	2.02 mi (3.25 km)	250 yd (230 m)
EF0	A weak QLCS tornado caused minor tree damage in North Brookfield.						
EF1	Aguada	Aguada	PR	18.3677°N 62.2°W	19:08–19:19	1.5 mi (2.4 km)	70 yd (64 m)
EF1	A couple of houses sustained damage to roofing and metal siding, including one house that sustained partial roof loss. Numerous trees were uprooted and snapped as well.						
EF0	SW of Dorrance	Russell	KS	37.80°N 98.666°W	22:10–22:14	0.88 mi (1.42 km)	300 yd (270 m)
EF0	A brief tornado impacted two farmsteads, causing minor damage to trees and heavily damaging a barn.						

=== July 17 event ===
List of confirmed tornadoes – Monday, July 17, 2023
EF#	Location	County / Parish	State	Start Coord.	Time (UTC)	Path length	Max width
EF0	St. Marys	Camden	GA	30.7241°N 81.5438°W	20:17–20:22	0.69 mi (1.11 km)	10 yd (9.1 m)
EF0	A landspout lofted some leaves and tossed loose objects.						
EF0	SW of Kinsley	Edwards	KS	37.86°N 99.47°W	21:55	0.01 mi (0.016 km)	1 yd (0.91 m)
EF0	A tornado was photographed as it inflicted no damage.						
EF0	NNE of Prescott to SE of Chino Valley	Yavapai	AZ	34.62°N 112.38°W	00:00–00:09	5.47 mi (8.80 km)	10 yd (9.1 m)
EF0	A landspout was captured on video. No damage occurred.						

=== July 18 event ===
List of confirmed tornadoes – Tuesday, July 18, 2023
EF#	Location	County / Parish	State	Start Coord.	Time (UTC)	Path length	Max width
EF1	SW of Barlow	Ballard	KY	37.0291°N 89.0718°W	17:43–17:44	0.39 mi (0.63 km)	60 yd (55 m)
EF1	A brief tornado caused minor roof damage to a house and snapped multiple trees.						
EF1	N of Black Hawk to SW of Hopson	Caldwell	KY	36.9757°N 87.8656°W	19:04-19:05	0.45 mi (0.72 km)	125 yd (114 m)
EF1	A brief tornado snapped trees and moved a mobile home 30 ft (9.1 m). A small barn was also destroyed.						
EF0	Southeastern Harvest	Madison	AL	34.81°N 86.71°W	22:14–22:18	2.4 mi (3.9 km)	100 yd (91 m)
EF0	A few trees were uprooted and minor roof damage occurred in the southeastern part of Harvest.						
EF0	E of Lebanon	Marion	KY	37.5782°N 85.1807°W	22:54–22:55	0.11 mi (0.18 km)	20 yd (18 m)
EF0	Several trees were damaged and an old barn was destroyed.						
EF0	S of Fort Pierre	Stanley	SD	37.5782°N 85.1807°W	23:45–23:50	0.12 mi (0.19 km)	10 yd (9.1 m)
EF0	This tornado was caught on video as it remained nearly stationary in an open field. No damage occurred.						
EFU	S of Gordon	Sheridan	NE	42.4177°N 102.0855°W	23:37–23:42	1.5 mi (2.4 km)	50 yd (46 m)
EFU	A tornado was photographed and caught on video as it moved over open land, causing no known damage.						

=== July 19 event ===
List of confirmed tornadoes – Wednesday, July 19, 2023
EF#	Location	County / Parish	State	Start Coord.	Time (UTC)	Path length	Max width
EF3	Dortches to Battleboro to N of Leggett	Nash, Edgecombe	NC	36.0009°N 77.8778°W	16:25–16:58	13.53 mi (21.77 km)	600 yd (550 m)
EF3	This intense, multiple-vortex tornado touched down southwest of Dortches, initially snapping some trees and bending power poles before it crossed I-95 and intensified as it entered the southern part of town, where several mobile homes were completely destroyed, a few of which were thrown up to 30 yd (27 m) from their foundations. Numerous power poles and trees were snapped as the tornado exited Dortches and continued to the east-northeast, crossing US 301. A house in this area was destroyed with only some of its interior walls and a brick fireplace left standing, and several other homes were heavily damaged. Farther along the path, the tornado flattened a metal truss transmission tower and partially destroyed a Pfizer warehouse near Battleboro. Multiple semi-trucks parked near the warehouse were tossed and destroyed. The tornado then weakened and entered Edgecombe County, causing less significant damage to trees and structures before it dissipated to the east-northeast of Battleboro. Sixteen people were injured.						
EFU	ENE of Tenstrike to S of Hines	Beltrami	MN	47.67°N 94.64°W	19:30–19:35	0.5 mi (0.80 km)	20 yd (18 m)
EFU	A brief tornado touched down but caused no damage.						

=== July 20 event ===
List of confirmed tornadoes – Thursday, July 20, 2023
EF#	Location	County / Parish	State	Start Coord.	Time (UTC)	Path length	Max width
EF1	SW of Green Mountain Falls	Teller, El Paso	CO	38.9133°N 105.0565°W	20:00–20:08	1.45 mi (2.33 km)	75 yd (69 m)
EF1	This high-end EF1 tornado touched down at an elevation of 9,000 ft (2,700 m) on the northern slopes of Pikes Peak. Numerous softwood trees were snapped or uprooted along the path.						
EF0	SW of Talking Rock	Pickens	GA	34.4937°N 84.6056°W	21:13–21:17	2.45 mi (3.94 km)	100 yd (91 m)
EF0	A brief tornado occurred on the north side of a larger area of straight-line wind damage. A few trees were snapped or uprooted and minor roof damage occurred.						
EF1	N of Marblehill	Pickens	GA	34.461°N 84.3531°W	21:23–21:26	1.9 mi (3.1 km)	100 yd (91 m)
EF1	A second tornado occurred on the north side of the same area of straight-line wind damage listed above. Several trees were snapped or uprooted, a house had its roof blown off, and another house suffered major roof damage. An outbuilding was destroyed as well.						

=== July 21 event ===
List of confirmed tornadoes – Friday, July 21, 2023
EF#	Location	County / Parish	State	Start Coord.	Time (UTC)	Path length	Max width
EF1	Southeastern Huntsville	Madison	AL	34.6763°N 86.5016°W	22:26-22:37	7.1 mi (11.4 km)	50 yd (46 m)
EF1	A few trees were snapped along a sporadic path.						

=== July 22 event ===
List of confirmed tornadoes – Saturday, July 22, 2023
EF#	Location	County / Parish	State	Start Coord.	Time (UTC)	Path length	Max width
EFU	NNE of Detroit	Dickinson	KS	38.9632°N 97.1055°W	21:43–21:44	0.04 mi (0.064 km)	20 yd (18 m)
EFU	A video was taken of a small, brief landspout. No damage occurred.						
EF0	Southeastern New Smyrna Beach	Volusia	FL	29.01°N 80.88°W	20:50–20:51	0.6 mi (0.97 km)	20 yd (18 m)
EF0	A landspout was caught on video as it touched down on a beach and moved offshore, becoming a waterspout. No damage was reported.						

=== July 24 event ===
List of confirmed tornadoes – Monday, July 24, 2023
EF#	Location	County / Parish	State	Start Coord.	Time (UTC)	Path length	Max width
EF2	NW of Bertrand	Scott	MO	36.9357°N 89.4861°W	19:10–19:12	0.28 mi (0.45 km)	25 yd (23 m)
EF2	A brief but damaging low-end EF2 tornado struck a small farmstead, destroying two barns and several grain bins. A house on the property sustained total roof loss and also had damage to its exterior walls. After damaging some trees near the farmstead, the tornado dissipated as it moved over farm fields. Two people were injured inside the house.						

=== July 25 event ===
List of confirmed tornadoes – Tuesday, July 25, 2023
EF#	Location	County / Parish	State	Start Coord.	Time (UTC)	Path length	Max width
EF0	SSW of Wessington	Hand	SD	44.26°N 98.81°W	01:55-01:58	0.06 mi (0.097 km)	10 yd (9.1 m)
EF0	A brief tornado collapsed the walls of a shed.						
EF0	ENE of Brewster to N of Almeria	Loup	NE	42.00°N 99.69°W	02:25-02:38	7.55 mi (12.15 km)	35 yd (32 m)
EF0	A sheriff reported a tornado. No damage occurred.						
EF0	New London	Kandiyohi	MN	45.3009°N 94.9739°W	04:01-04:03	1.39 mi (2.24 km)	75 yd (69 m)
EF0	This tornado moved through New London, where three homes and a large shed had small parts of their roofs torn off. Other homes sustained shingle, soffit, and siding damage, and many trees were snapped or uprooted.						

=== July 26 event ===
List of confirmed tornadoes – Wednesday, July 26, 2023
EF#	Location	County / Parish	State	Start Coord.	Time (UTC)	Path length	Max width
EF0	N of Munith	Jackson	MI	42.415°N 84.252°W	18:39–18:43	1.44 mi (2.32 km)	150 yd (140 m)
EF0	A brief tornado uprooted trees and caused minor damage to a few homes.						
EF0	SSE of Stockbridge	Jackson, Livingston	MI	42.418°N 84.168°W	18:47–18:51	2.06 mi (3.32 km)	100 yd (91 m)
EF0	Intermittent tree damage occurred and a business suffered minor roof and siding damage.						

=== July 27 event ===
List of confirmed tornadoes – Thursday, July 27, 2023
EF#	Location	County / Parish	State	Start Coord.	Time (UTC)	Path length	Max width
EF1	SW of Keene to northern Marlborough to Dublin	Cheshire	NH	42.91°N 72.31°W	18:50–19:12	12.65 mi (20.36 km)	200 yd (180 m)
EF1	An intermittent tornado touched down to the southwest of Keene, snapping multiple trees before it momentarily lifted as the circulation moved east and passed over the south side of town. Past Keene, the tornado touched down again and moved through the northern fringes of Marlborough, where more trees were downed and a few landed on vehicles. A truck in this area was nearly tipped over, a trampoline was thrown, and a building suffered a broken window. Hundreds of additional trees were snapped as the tornado tracked through wooded areas along NH 101 to the east. It then struck Dublin, where many more trees were snapped, a few of which fell on vehicles. Some buildings in this area had shingle, siding, and window damage, and a grill was thrown 100 ft (30 m). The tornado dissipated as it exited Dublin.						
EF0	Hiles	Forest	WI	45.7084°N 89.002°W	00:22–00:26	1.68 mi (2.70 km)	90 yd (82 m)
EF0	This weak tornado impacted areas in and around Hiles, snapping and uprooting trees and downing tree limbs. Minor damage to outbuildings occurred, and a camper was overturned.						

=== July 28 event ===
List of confirmed tornadoes – Friday, July 28, 2023
EF#	Location	County / Parish	State	Start Coord.	Time (UTC)	Path length	Max width
EF0	NBE of Popejoy to N of Burdette	Franklin	IA	42.6152°N 93.4096°W	22:46–22:54	2.81 mi (4.52 km)	120 yd (110 m)
EF0	A slow-moving tornado hit a hog confinement building, causing the roof to collapse.						
EF1	NNE of Burdette	Franklin	IA	42.6067°N 93.349°W	22:55–22:59	1.82 mi (2.93 km)	125 yd (114 m)
EF1	A tornado was caught on video as it moved mainly through open fields, though it did strike and heavily damage a hog confinement building.						
EF0	Clinton to S of Fulton	Clinton (IA), Whiteside (IL)	IA, IL	41.85°N 90.19°W	02:16–02:19	1.04 mi (1.67 km)	20 yd (18 m)
EF0	This weak tornado caused tree damage in Clinton, including on the property of the Clinton County Courthouse. The tornado moved a boat docked on the Mississippi River before it crossed into Illinois, snapping some tree limbs and quickly dissipating.						
EFU	WNW of Northville	LaSalle	IL	41.571°N 88.741°W	03:25–03:27	1.68 mi (2.70 km)	20 yd (18 m)
EFU	A tornado caused damage to crops in farm fields.						
EF0	E of Palmyra	Jefferson, Waukesha	WI	42.885°N 88.558°W	03:28–03:31	1.27 mi (2.04 km)	90 yd (82 m)
EF0	Multiple trees were snapped or uprooted to the east of Palmyra.						
EF0	SE of Sandwich	DeKalb, Kendall	IL	41.641°N 88.6109°W	03:32–03:34	0.78 mi (1.26 km)	20 yd (18 m)
EF0	A brief tornado mainly impacted open farmland just outside of Sandwich, but caused damage to the roof of one outbuilding.						
EF0	S of Newark to Lisbon	Kendall	IL	41.4899°N 88.5709°W	03:35–03:41	4.89 mi (7.87 km)	80 yd (73 m)
EF0	This high-end EF0 tornado touched down to the south of Newark, where barns, outbuildings, and silos were damaged or destroyed and a window was broken at a motel. A few homes sustained roof, garage door, and exterior damage, a fence was blown over, and trees and tree limbs were downed. The tornado struck Lisbon shortly before it dissipated, causing additional tree damage, including a couple of trees that fell onto structures.						
EF0	E of Lisbon	Kendall	IL	41.4781°N 88.4201°W	03:44–03:45	1 mi (1.6 km)	20 yd (18 m)
EF0	A brief tornado damaged crops and snapped limbs off of trees.						
EF1	Northern Minooka to southern Shorewood to western Joliet	Kendall, Will	IL	41.481°N 88.2825°W	03:52–04:02	7.62 mi (12.26 km)	225 yd (206 m)
EF1	A tornado touched down in a subdivision in northern Minooka, downing tree branches. Additional minor tree damage continued as it crossed into Will County. Moving northeastward, the tornado intensified as it tracked through the south side of Shorewood, where numerous trees were snapped and houses suffered considerable roof and siding damage. It then crossed I-55 and continued into the west side of Joliet, causing sporadic tree damage before lifting.						
EF0	Minooka to northeastern Channahon	Grundy, Will	IL	41.4579°N 88.2678°W	03:53–03:59	5.15 mi (8.29 km)	250 yd (230 m)
EF0	This high-end EF0 tornado touched down in Minooka, where a church had a section of its roof torn off, homes had minor roof shingle damage, and many tree branches were downed. The tornado crossed into Will County, causing additional tree damage and toppling a fence before it lifted over the Des Plaines River.						
EF0	N of Wilmington to NNW of Symerton	Will	IL	41.3636°N 88.1732°W	03:59–04:05	5.13 mi (8.26 km)	60 yd (55 m)
EF0	This tornado tracked through the Midewin National Tallgrass Prairie, causing tree damage.						
EF0	NNE of Symerton to Wilton Center to SW of Andres	Will	IL	41.3567°N 88.0373°W	04:07–04:15	7.14 mi (11.49 km)	60 yd (55 m)
EF0	After the previous tornado lifted, another one touched down at the eastern periphery of the Midewin National Tallgrass Prairie and moved eastward. Numerous large tree limbs were downed and several trees were uprooted, with one of the trees falling onto a house and damaging its roof. The house also sustained shingle, gutter, siding, fascia, and soffit damage. The tornado continued to track due-east and impacted areas in and around Wilton Center, causing intermittent damage to corn and trees before dissipating.						
EF0	W of Bourbonnais to Bradley to northern Kankakee	Kankakee	IL	41.1559°N 87.9455°W	04:19–04:24	6.07 mi (9.77 km)	350 yd (320 m)
EF0	This tornado touched down in the River Bend subdivision near Bourbonnais, uprooting trees, snapping tree limbs, and damaging the roofs of a few homes. It tracked southeastward across the Kankakee River into Bradley, downing several tree branches in residential areas, a few of which caused damage to homes. The tree damage became more significant as the tornado moved through the north side of Kankakee, including some large tree limbs that fell onto houses. One house had a piece of vinyl siding torn off, and a Valspar warehouse sustained partial collapse of an exterior wall. The tornado lifted as it crossed I-57.						
EFU	S of Peotone	Will	IL	41.3001°N 87.8032°W	04:22–04:24	1.46 mi (2.35 km)	15 yd (14 m)
EFU	A weak tornado damaged soybeans.						
EF1	N of Sun River Terrace to southern Momence to WSW of Garden of Eden	Kankakee	IL	41.1551°N 87.7224°W	04:30–04:36	5.51 mi (8.87 km)	90 yd (82 m)
EF1	A tornado touched down in a rural area to the north of Sun River Terrace, peeling metal roofing off of an outbuilding, snapping tree branches, and causing crop damage in corn fields as it moved to the east. The tornado crossed the Kankakee River and entered the south side of Momence at high-end EF1 intensity, where a two-story apartment building was unroofed and sustained collapse of some second-floor exterior walls. Nearby apartment buildings suffered roof, window, and siding damage, numerous trees were snapped or uprooted, and power lines were downed. A couple of homes had minor roof shingle damage as well. The roof of a metal warehouse building was damaged at the southeast edge of Momence as the tornado exited town, and several power poles, a fence, and signs were toppled over nearby. The tornado struck the small community of Ahern just before it dissipated, partially unroofing a metal outbuilding, inflicting shingle and siding damage to a few homes, and snapping tree limbs.						
EF0	W of Morocco	Newton	IN	40.9442°N 87.4886°W	04:49–04:51	1.22 mi (1.96 km)	20 yd (18 m)
EF0	A tornado touched down in a rural area, damaging trees and flattening corn in farm fields.						
EF0	ESE of Morocco	Newton	IN	40.9294°N 87.4194°W	04:54–04:55	0.63 mi (1.01 km)	30 yd (27 m)
EF0	This tornado destroyed a grain bin and damaged a few trees.						

=== July 29 event ===
List of confirmed tornadoes – Saturday, July 29, 2023
EF#	Location	County / Parish	State	Start Coord.	Time (UTC)	Path length	Max width
EF0	E of Walton to SSE of Onward	Cass	IN	40.6702°N 86.2114°W	06:19–06:21	2.1 mi (3.4 km)	50 yd (46 m)
EF0	Minor damage to trees and crops occurred along the path of this weak tornado.						
EF0	S of Churubusco	Whitley, Allen	IN	41.18°N 85.32°W	06:26–06:29	2.68 mi (4.31 km)	150 yd (140 m)
EF0	A tornado touched down and tracked over a golf course, damaging trees. It then crossed into Allen County, where tree limbs and a few trees were snapped, some metal power poles were leaned over slightly, and a home sustained roof and siding damage.						
EF1	NNW of Hicksville	Defiance	OH	41.3266°N 84.794°W	06:53–06:54	0.71 mi (1.14 km)	100 yd (91 m)
EF1	Several trees were snapped or uprooted, three barns suffered minor damage, and a house had damage to its roof and pool deck.						
EF1	E of Bucyrus to northern North Robinson to western Crestline	Crawford	OH	40.80°N 82.90°W	07:58–08:03	6.24 mi (10.04 km)	100 yd (91 m)
EF1	A tornado touched down, causing significant damage to a barn before tracking east-southeast and snapping or uprooting numerous trees. Along its path, 12 homes sustained moderate damage, while another home was destroyed by the tornado and fallen trees. The tornado continued east-southeast, damaging three silos at a facility before dissipating shortly afterward on the western side of Crestline.						
EF1	Sutton	Clay	NE	40.61°N 97.87°W	11:53–11:56	1.62 mi (2.61 km)	260 yd (240 m)
EF1	A high-end EF1 tornado moved directly through Sutton, causing considerable damage. Buildings in the downtown area sustained roof loss and collapse of unreinforced masonry walls, one of which had its metal roof torn off and thrown a block away. A few other buildings in downtown Sutton suffered broken windows and damage to their brick exteriors. Homes sustained damage to windows, siding, roofs, and porches, and many trees and power poles were snapped in town. Several garages and outbuildings were completely destroyed, one of which was swept from its foundation and thrown into a nearby house and garage, significantly damaging both structures. A metal carport was thrown 150 yd (140 m), a hotel had roof shingle damage, and a maintenance building at a country club was partially destroyed as the tornado exited town, with debris scattered hundreds of yards across the golf course. Some corn was flattened in a farm field just outside of Sutton before the tornado dissipated.						
EF1	Martell	Lancaster	NE	40.6358°N 96.7625°W	13:18–13:19	0.28 mi (0.45 km)	100 yd (91 m)
EF1	A brief, high-end EF1 tornado embedded in intense downburst winds struck Martell, where a bed and breakfast attached to a large barn had its roof ripped off. Homes in town had roof and siding damage and a detached garage was destroyed. Trees were snapped and uprooted as well, one of which fell onto a house.						
EFU	NNE of Bennett	Adams	CO	39.94°N 104.36°W	23:30–23:31	0.01 mi (0.016 km)	25 yd (23 m)
EFU	A small tornado touched down over open country. No damage occurred.						
EF0	Eastern Foxboro	Norfolk	MA	42.0538°N 71.1918°W	00:17–00:18	0.16 mi (0.26 km)	25 yd (23 m)
EF0	A very brief tornado downed trees in a neighborhood on the east side of Foxboro, one of which knocked over a chimney. The tornado may have been on the ground longer, but surveyors were unable to access conservation land east of the surveyed damage.						

=== July 31 event ===
List of confirmed tornadoes – Monday, July 31, 2023
EF#	Location	County / Parish	State	Start Coord.	Time (UTC)	Path length	Max width
EFU	NE of Athol Springs	Erie	NY	42.7698°N 78.8439°W	18:43	Unknown	Unknown
EFU	A waterspout moved onshore from Lake Erie and kicked up dust. No damage occurred.						
EFU	SE of Carr	Weld	CO	40.86°N 104.82°W	23:46–23:47	0.01 mi (0.016 km)	25 yd (23 m)
EFU	A tornado touched down briefly over open country. No damage occurred.						

== August ==
Confirmed tornadoes by Enhanced Fujita rating
EFU	EF0	EF1	EF2	EF3	EF4	EF5	Total
31	52	53	9	2	0	0	147

=== August 1 event ===
List of confirmed tornadoes – Tuesday, August 1, 2023
EF#	Location	County / Parish	State	Start Coord.	Time (UTC)	Path length	Max width
EFU	SW of Wilton	Burleigh	ND	47.1501°N 100.8097°W	02:04–02:07	0.44 mi (0.71 km)	50 yd (46 m)
EFU	A tornado touched down in an open field, impacting no structures and causing no damage.						

=== August 3 event ===
List of confirmed tornadoes – Thursday, August 3, 2023
EF#	Location	County / Parish	State	Start Coord.	Time (UTC)	Path length	Max width
EF1	Oral	Roane	TN	35.8367°N 84.3675°W	18:21–18:22	0.5 mi (0.80 km)	200 yd (180 m)
EF1	A brief tornado tracked through the small community of Oral along US 70/SR 1. A detached garage was completely destroyed, with debris strewn across the ground and into nearby trees. A few homes suffered roof damage, including one that had part of its roof removed. Trees were snapped or uprooted, and fences were damaged as well.						
EF0	SE of Carnesville to Royston to NW of Bowman	Franklin, Hart, Elbert	GA	34.33°N 83.18°W	18:48–19:03	10.42 mi (16.77 km)	25 yd (23 m)
EF0	This tornado touched down in Franklin County, where damage was limited to trees. The tornado then continued into Hart County, uprooting and snapping more trees in and around Royston before it quickly dissipated after it crossed into Elbert County.						
EF0	E of Six Mile	Pickens	SC	34.822°N 82.76°W	19:14–19:15	0.66 mi (1.06 km)	50 yd (46 m)
EF0	A brief, weak tornado caused mainly minor tree and outbuilding damage, although one small metal shelter was thrown 50 yards (46 m).						
EF0	Pickens	Pickens	SC	34.882°N 82.734°W	20:12–20:15	1.37 mi (2.20 km)	50 yd (46 m)
EF0	A weak tornado moved through Pickens, where numerous tree branches and a few trees were downed. Multiple garages and outbuildings were damaged, and a house had minor roof damage as well.						

=== August 4 event ===
List of confirmed tornadoes – Friday, August 4, 2023
EF#	Location	County / Parish	State	Start Coord.	Time (UTC)	Path length	Max width
EF0	Millvile	Ray	MO	39.4059°N 93.9435°W	22:57–23:11	4.55 mi (7.32 km)	20 yd (18 m)
EF0	A weak tornado passed through Millville, causing roof damage to homes, including one that had its chimney knocked down. Outbuildings and trees were also damaged, and hay bales were tossed as well.						
EF0	E of Malta Bend	Saline	MO	39.1972°N 93.3529°W	00:17–00:20	1.54 mi (2.48 km)	20 yd (18 m)
EF0	A high-end EF0 tornado moved eastward along US 65, damaging trees and power poles.						
EF2	Baring	Knox	MO	40.26°N 92.22°W	04:13–04:15	1.64 mi (2.64 km)	450 yd (410 m)
EF2	This damaging tornado touched down southeast of Baring, quickly becoming strong and striking a farmstead as it moved along an unusual northwestward path. A house on the property had its roof and some exterior walls removed, a machine shed and a large outbuilding were completely destroyed, and grain bins were thrown up to a half-mile away. Trees and power poles were snapped nearby before the tornado moved directly through Baring, where significant damage occurred. The local post office was destroyed with only a few walls left standing, a mobile home was completely destroyed, and a few other mobile homes were heavily damaged. A restaurant was unroofed, vehicles were damaged, and shipping containers and anhydrous ammonia tanks were tossed around. A couple of one-story apartment buildings had partial to total roof loss, and frame homes in town sustained considerable roof, siding, and window damage. Sheds, garages, and outbuildings were damaged or destroyed, and many large trees were snapped or uprooted. A total of 7 businesses and 62 homes were damaged or destroyed in Baring before the tornado exited town and moved to the north-northwest. An outbuilding and some trees sustained minor damage before the tornado dissipated. Two people were injured.						

=== August 5 event ===
List of confirmed tornadoes – Saturday, August 5, 2023
EF#	Location	County / Parish	State	Start Coord.	Time (UTC)	Path length	Max width
EF1	SW of Marcelline to NW of Mendon	Adams	IL	40.1099°N 91.3759°W	07:24–07:31	2.87 mi (4.62 km)	200 yd (180 m)
EF1	A low-end EF1 tornado inflicted heavy roof and siding damage to a home, while another house suffered a broken window. Multiple outbuildings were damaged or destroyed, crops and power poles were damaged, and many trees were snapped or uprooted.						
EFU	ENE of Gleneagle to NW of Peyton	El Paso	CO	39.07°N 104.67°W	19:40–19:44	2.16 mi (3.48 km)	10 yd (9.1 m)
EFU	A trained spotter observed a tornado. No damage occurred.						
EF0	NNW of Maurice	Sioux	IA	42.993°N 96.21°W	19:30–19:33	0.92 mi (1.48 km)	30 yd (27 m)
EF0	A highly visible and slow-moving tornado damaged several hardwood trees.						
EFU	SSW of Sioux Center	Sioux	IA	43.047°N 96.209°W	19:42	0.05 mi (0.080 km)	10 yd (9.1 m)
EFU	A very brief tornado was photographed. No damage occurred.						
EF0	NE of Grand Tower	Jackson	IL	37.6556°N 89.4677°W	22:15–22:16	0.5 mi (0.80 km)	25 yd (23 m)
EF0	A brief tornado occurred in a field. No damage was observed.						
EFU	ENE of Willow Hill	Jasper	IL	39.02°N 87.97°W	22:30–22:31	0.11 mi (0.18 km)	20 yd (18 m)
EFU	A brief tornado touched down in an open field, causing no damage.						
EFU	E of Snyder	Dodge	NE	41.71°N 96.71°W	00:53	0.1 mi (0.16 km)	25 yd (23 m)
EFU	A brief tornado caused no damage.						
EFU	E of Arcadia	Carroll	IA	42.0859°N 94.9636°W	02:24–02:25	0.32 mi (0.51 km)	25 yd (23 m)
EFU	A brief tornado occurred, causing no damage.						
EF0	SSW of Auburn	Sac	IA	42.2139°N 94.8951°W	02:29–02:31	0.9 mi (1.4 km)	35 yd (32 m)
EF0	An outbuilding was damaged by this brief tornado, with debris being thrown into a farm field.						
EFU	SW of Auburn	Sac	IA	42.2235°N 94.9021°W	02:30–02:31	0.32 mi (0.51 km)	50 yd (46 m)
EFU	High resolution satellite imagery revealed a tornado path through open agricultural fields. Only crop damage occurred.						

=== August 6 event ===
List of confirmed tornadoes – Sunday, August 6, 2023
EF#	Location	County / Parish	State	Start Coord.	Time (UTC)	Path length	Max width
EF0	NE of Lima	Beaverhead	MT	44.677°N 112.411°W	20:12–20:19	1.64 mi (2.64 km)	40 yd (37 m)
EF0	A landspout tornado was caught on video near the Lima Reservoir. No damage occurred.						
EFU	S of Boulder	Jefferson	MT	46.079°N 112.133°W	21:11–21:17	3.66 mi (5.89 km)	70 yd (64 m)
EFU	A well-documented tornado occurred in the Whitetail Basin area. No structural damage occurred and most areas were inaccessible for surveying. This was the first ever recorded tornado in Jefferson County.						
EFU	SE of Dallas City to E of La Harpe	Hancock	IL	40.5776°N 91.0899°W	22:40–23:15	8.01 mi (12.89 km)	20 yd (18 m)
EFU	An intermittent multiple-vortex tornado was caught on video as it moved through open fields. No damage was reported.						
EF2	N of Pawnee to N of Taylorville to NW of Assumption	Sangamon, Christian	IL	39.6341°N 89.5702°W	23:09–00:03	25.31 mi (40.73 km)	450 yd (410 m)
EF2	A strong, long-tracked tornado touched down in Sangamon County near Pawnee, downing some trees and inflicting minor roof damage to a home before it quickly crossed into Christian County, damaging a few farm buildings and grain bins near the county line. It then strengthened as it moved across Sangchris Lake and passed between Kincaid and Sharpsburg, snapping and uprooting numerous large trees and tearing roofing and siding from a few homes, one of which was shifted off its foundation and had an exterior wall pushed in. A couple of barns were damaged along this segment of the path as well. The tornado then passed north of Taylorville and reached peak intensity near Willeys, where about two-thirds of a one-story house was destroyed, two other homes had roof damage, and a metal outbuilding was heavily damaged. Father east, the tornado rolled and destroyed a camper, damaged the roof of another house, snapped additional trees, and flattened corn in farm fields before it dissipated.						
EF1	W of Haysville to SSW of Paoli	Dubois, Orange	IN	38.4896°N 86.9426°W	04:24–04:53	25.9 mi (41.7 km)	200 yd (180 m)
EF1	This long-tracked, high-end EF1 tornado first damaged or destroyed a few outbuildings and tore fencing apart before it moved directly through Haysville. A business, some outbuildings, and a couple of homes in and around town suffered roof and gutter damage, and a greenhouse was destroyed. The tornado continued to the east of Haysville, unroofing a one-story house, inflicting minor damage to another house, and damaging or destroying multiple barns. It then struck Kellerville, damaging trees and a trailer before it passed near Dubois Crossroads, where at least 10 large poultry barns were heavily damaged or destroyed, killing numerous turkeys. Moving eastward, the tornado impacted Crystal, where homes, grain bins, and outbuildings were damaged. It then passed near Hillham, tossing and destroying a camper, damaging or destroying outbuildings and garages, and damaging several homes, one of which sustained destruction of its attached garage. As the tornado tracked south of French Lick, it rolled multiple vehicles, trailers, and mobile homes. A house and a cabin in this area had roof and siding damage, a metal carport and an outbuilding were destroyed, and some power lines were downed. Farther along the path, a few homes had significant roof and exterior damage, barns and outbuildings were damaged or destroyed, and debris was scattered across fields before the tornado dissipated near Paoli. Countless trees were snapped or uprooted along the path.						
EF1	Southern French Lick	Orange	IN	38.5429°N 86.6233°W	04:45–04:46	0.98 mi (1.58 km)	40 yd (37 m)
EF1	A brief high-end EF1 tornado moved through the south side of French Lick, snapping or uprooting numerous large trees. Several houses sustained considerable roof and siding damage, and a sand storage barn had its roof torn off.						
EF1	Northern Paoli	Orange	IN	38.5636°N 86.4807°W	04:53–04:55	1 mi (1.6 km)	110 yd (100 m)
EF1	This tornado moved through the north side of Paoli, where multiple warehouses and commercial buildings had their roofs blown off, with sheet metal scattered up to 200 yd (180 m) away. Trees were snapped or uprooted, a few of which landed on homes. One house sustained collapse of its porch, and many power poles were downed as well. This was the first of three tornadoes that occurred simultaneously in or around Paoli.						
EF0	SSE of Paoli	Orange	IN	38.5345°N 86.4598°W	04:53–04:54	0.56 mi (0.90 km)	60 yd (55 m)
EF0	A brief high-end EF0 tornado crossed SR 37 just south of Paoli and moved through Pioneer Mothers Memorial Forest, snapping or uprooting many trees. This was the second of three tornadoes that occurred simultaneously in or around Paoli.						
EF1	Paoli to W of Livonia	Orange	IN	38.5577°N 86.4863°W	04:53–05:02	8.74 mi (14.07 km)	175 yd (160 m)
EF1	This tornado first caused minor roof damage at the Crestwood Manufacturing facility on the west side of Paoli before it moved directly through the downtown area, where some businesses suffered roof damage or had their brick facades damaged or partially collapsed. A church sustained roof damage and broken windows, and the Orange County Courthouse had multiple large chimneys knocked over. Many trees, power poles, and signs were blown over as well, including a couple of trees that fell on houses. The tornado then exited Paoli and tracked eastward, downing more trees and power lines, peeling back the roof of an outbuilding, causing crop damage, and heavily damaging two large grain silos as it moved through areas in and around the rural communities of Stampers Creek and Mahan Crossing. A manufactured home, an outbuilding, and trees were damaged in Millersburg before the tornado dissipated. This was the third of three tornadoes that occurred simultaneously in or around Paoli.						

=== August 7 event ===
List of confirmed tornadoes – Monday, August 7, 2023
EF#	Location	County / Parish	State	Start Coord.	Time (UTC)	Path length	Max width
EF1	Western Salem	Washington	IN	38.5957°N 86.1412°W	05:13–05:15	1.78 mi (2.86 km)	60 yd (55 m)
EF1	This tornado impacted the west edge of Salem, where a few businesses sustained roof, siding, and gutter damage, with debris scattered up to 150 yd (140 m) away. A metal garage structure at the Salem Speedway was also damaged, and trees and power poles were snapped as well.						
EF2	Western Knoxville	Knox	TN	35.9308°N 84.158°W	18:17–18:23	3.7 mi (6.0 km)	200 yd (180 m)
EF2	A high-end EF2 tornado embedded within a larger area of straight-line damage moved through several subdivisions and an apartment complex in the western part of Knoxville. Multiple three-story apartment buildings were heavily damaged and sustained roof loss, a debris impact left a large hole in the side of the apartment complex office, and a large garage structure on the property was completely destroyed. Multiple homes had major roof damage, wooden boards were driven into the ground, and many large hardwood trees were snapped or uprooted as well.						
EF1	S of Erwin, TN to WNW of Green Mountain	Yancey, Mitchell	NC	36.036°N 82.402°W	18:48–18:57	6.23 mi (10.03 km)	50 yd (46 m)
EF1	A rare high-altitude tornado moved through rugged mountainous terrain, uprooting multiple trees and snapping tree limbs. This was the first ever tornado recorded in Mitchell County and the third tornado ever recorded in Yancey County, being the first since June 6, 1977.						
EF1	NW of Louisa, KY to NE of Fort Gay, WV	Lawrence (KY), Wayne (WV)	KY, WV	38.1331°N 82.6784°W	19:00–19:10	6.31 mi (10.15 km)	400 yd (370 m)
EF1	In Kentucky, this tornado destroyed a small utility building, overturned a construction trailer and two semi-trailers, and snapped or uprooted many trees. Some of the trees fell on homes, one of which sustained extensive damage to its attached garage. The tornado crossed the Big Sandy River into West Virginia, where a house had siding torn off and additional trees were downed before the tornado dissipated.						
EF1	SW of Claremont to Northern Mooresville to E of China Grove	Catawba, Iredell, Rowan	NC	35.7°N 81.17°W	20:40–21:22	36.23 mi (58.31 km)	550 yd (500 m)
EF1	This weak but long-tracked tornado touched down near Claremont and moved southeastward, snapping many trees and tree branches. More trees were downed as the tornado crossed into Iredell County and struck the north side of Mooresville. The tornado crossed into Rowan County, where additional tree damage occurred and a mobile home had part of its roof torn off. It then moved through Landis, where buildings sustained minor damage and trees were toppled over onto homes. Some additional trees were uprooted to the east of China Grove before the tornado dissipated.						
EF1	Blackrock	York	PA	39.7225°N 76.8603°W	21:02–21:05	0.52 mi (0.84 km)	75 yd (69 m)
EF1	Trees and tree limbs were snapped in Blackrock, and damage to homes occurred as well. The roof of an outbuilding collapsed and another outbuilding was completely destroyed.						
EF0	Western Huntersville	Mecklenburg	NC	35.41°N 80.93°W	21:07–21:10	1.8 mi (2.9 km)	50 yd (46 m)
EF0	A weak tornado touched down just south of Lake Norman, uprooting some trees and inflicting minor exterior damage to a few homes as it moved through the western part of Huntersville.						
EF1	SSE of Dryden to SE of Blodgett Mills	Tompkins, Cortland	NY	42.4437°N 76.2688°W	21:13–21:36	11.11 mi (17.88 km)	200 yd (180 m)
EF1	This low-end EF1 tornado unroofed and partially collapsed outbuildings, snapped or uprooted dozens of trees, knocked over fences and a playground, and threw a raft into a tree. Some power lines were downed as well.						
EF1	E of Cross Roads	York	PA	39.8181°N 76.554°W	21:24–21:28	1.53 mi (2.46 km)	50 yd (46 m)
EF1	Corn was flattened in a farm field and dozens of trees were snapped.						
EFU	WNW of Bird City	Cheyenne	KS	39.7612°N 101.5728°W	21:35–21:36	0.24 mi (0.39 km)	75 yd (69 m)
EFU	A storm chaser documented a brief landspout tornado in a field. No damage occurred.						
EF0	Rawlinsville	Lancaster	PA	39.8806°N 76.2673°W	21:40–21:41	0.51 mi (0.82 km)	40 yd (37 m)
EF0	A narrow swath of corn was flattened and a tree was snapped. Several other trees had branches snapped off.						
EF1	ENE of Harmony, PA to SW of Deposit, NY	Susquehanna (PA), Broome (NY)	PA, NY	41.9795°N 75.5018°W	22:25–22:35	3.37 mi (5.42 km)	200 yd (180 m)
EF1	Multiple trees were snapped or uprooted in Pennsylvania before the tornado crossed into New York. There, a house had roof shingle damage and broken windows, a shed was moved about 100 ft (30 m), and a couple of small boats were lofted from a pond.						
EF0	SSE of Munnsville	Madison	NY	42.94°N 75.58°W	22:55–22:59	1.47 mi (2.37 km)	175 yd (160 m)
EF0	A weak tornado snapped numerous tree limbs, damaged outbuildings, sheds, and garages, and knocked over a street sign.						
EF1	NE of Vernon Center	Oneida	NY	43.0562°N 75.4648°W	23:10–23:15	1.31 mi (2.11 km)	200 yd (180 m)
EF1	Many trees were snapped or uprooted and an outbuilding was damaged.						
EF1	NNE of Taberg	Oneida	NY	43.33°N 75.59°W	23:17–23:20	1.38 mi (2.22 km)	110 yd (100 m)
EF1	A high-end EF1 tornado snapped numerous trees and damaged the roof of a mobile home.						
EF1	Northeastern Allentown to Northwestern Bethlehem	Lehigh	PA	40.63°N 75.4246°W	23:21–23:23	0.3 mi (0.48 km)	160 yd (150 m)
EF1	A brief tornado touched down in the northeastern part of Allentown and impacted the Midway Manor neighborhood, where multiple homes sustained roof and siding damage, and one house had its porch awning ripped off and thrown 100 ft (30 m). A church also suffered roof damage, along with a nearby shed. Another shed was blown 50 ft (15 m) off its foundation elsewhere. A swing set and some fencing was knocked over, and patio furniture was tossed. The tornado entered the northwestern edge of Bethlehem and caused some additional tree damage before it dissipated						
EFU	ENE of Redfield	Lewis	NY	43.54°N 75.7°W	23:27–23:30	0.85 mi (1.37 km)	100 yd (91 m)
EFU	Sentinel-2 satellite imagery located a path of tornado damage in a heavily wooded area. No ground survey was conducted because of limited access to the area.						
EF0	NE of Kintnersville, PA	Hunterdon	NJ	40.57°N 75.16°W	23:37–23:38	0.52 mi (0.84 km)	150 yd (140 m)
EF0	Two farm outbuildings and some trees were damaged.						
EF3	W of West Leyden to Turin	Lewis	NY	43.46°N 75.51°W	23:42–00:14	16 mi (26 km)	700 yd (640 m)
EF3	At the beginning of the damage path near West Leyden, this strong tornado ripped the roof off of a house and inflicted significant damage to its second-floor exterior walls. Two other homes in this area were also heavily damaged and had their roofs uplifted, and a large garage structure had exterior walls blown out. Numerous large trees were snapped, uprooted, and defoliated in wooded areas, a barn was completely destroyed, and another barn was significantly damaged. The tornado then weakened and tracked through remote swampy terrain with less continuous tree damage, although surveyors had difficulty reaching this area due to a lack of road access. Towards the end of its track in Turin, the tornado intensified again as it struck the Snow Ridge Ski Resort, where all of the chair lift cables failed, some large metal chair lift support structures were toppled over or damaged, and many more trees were snapped and defoliated. Major structural damage occurred at the West Wind Motel, where several buildings had their roofs ripped off or collapsed, and also had some interior walls knocked down. A multi-story building was also shifted off its foundation and was completely unroofed. The tornado then abruptly lifted and dissipated after striking the motel.						

=== August 8 event ===
List of confirmed tornadoes – Tuesday, August 8, 2023
EF#	Location	County / Parish	State	Start Coord.	Time (UTC)	Path length	Max width
EF1	Northern Mattapoisett	Plymouth	MA	41.6808°N 70.8477°W	15:20–15:23	0.9 mi (1.4 km)	300 yd (270 m)
EF1	Numerous trees were snapped and uprooted along the northern outskirts of Mattapoisett.						
EF0	Southwestern Barnstable	Barnstable	MA	41.6751°N 70.3917°W	15:52–15:56	1.2 mi (1.9 km)	650 yd (590 m)
EF0	A tornado uprooted a tree, snapped tree limbs, damaged fences, and downed an electrical pole on the southwest side of Barnstable.						
EF0	WSW of Tuba City	Coconino	AZ	36.02°N 111.39°W	19:50–20:00	4.99 mi (8.03 km)	10 yd (9.1 m)
EF0	A landspout tornado caught on video as it lofted dust in an unpopulated area. No damage occurred.						
EF3	E of Otis to SW of Yuma	Washington, Yuma	CO	40.1455°N 102.9141°W	22:39–23:25	15.65 mi (25.19 km)	212 yd (194 m)
EF3	This strong stovepipe tornado looped over its path multiple times and was well-documented by multiple storm chasers. At the beginning of the path in Washington County, the tornado damaged a detached garage and shifted it off its foundation. A metal shack had tin roofing removed, a tin storage container was flipped, power poles and crops were damaged, and trees were snapped. After crossing into Yuma County and overturning some irrigation pivots, the tornado strengthened and significantly damaged a well-built home, which sustained total destruction of its three-car attached garage, suffered partial roof loss, had doors blown in, and also sustained broken windows. A barn was heavily damaged nearby, and multiple wooden power poles and trees were snapped. The tornado then struck a farm property, where a large and well-built anchored metal outbuilding was completely destroyed and swept off its foundation, leaving behind only a bare concrete slab and a pile of mangled metal beams. A 5,000-pound engine stored inside the building was thrown and never recovered, metal debris was strewn across a nearby field, and farm machinery was damaged. Two metal grain bins were completely swept away nearby, and were ripped away with such force that their round concrete foundation pads were cracked and rebar was bent. The tornado snapped several large power poles, including a very sturdy laminated power pole, before it dissipated just southwest of Yuma. Coupled with the EF3 tornado that occurred in Prowers County on June 23, 2023, this event marked the first time that two F3/EF3+ tornadoes touched down in Colorado in the same year since 1993.						
EFU	N of Broadwater	Morrill	NE	41.7°N 102.84°W	22:50	0.05 mi (0.080 km)	25 yd (23 m)
EFU	A brief tornado was caught on video. No damage occurred						
EFU	SE of Yuma	Yuma	CO	40.0603°N 102.6425°W	23:30–23:46	5.28 mi (8.50 km)	200 yd (180 m)
EFU	A multiple-vortex tornado was observed moving across open land. No damage was reported.						
EF0	S of Yuma	Yuma	CO	39.9045°N 102.716°W	00:04–00:08	1.67 mi (2.69 km)	193 yd (176 m)
EF0	Storm chasers observed a tornado that did damage to corn.						
EFU	NE of Cope	Yuma	CO	39.8553°N 102.6889°W	00:19–00:22	1 mi (1.6 km)	150 yd (140 m)
EFU	Multiple chasers observed a brief rope tornado that remained over an open field and caused no damage.						
EFU	NE of Cope	Yuma	CO	39.8129°N 102.6587°W	00:23–00:32	0.93 mi (1.50 km)	75 yd (69 m)
EFU	This tornado remained over open fields, causing no damage.						
EFU	W of Idalia	Yuma	CO	39.6886°N 102.5101°W	01:00–01:14	0.45 mi (0.72 km)	150 yd (140 m)
EFU	An intermittent tornado remained over an open field, causing no damage.						
EF2	SW of Idalia	Yuma, Kit Carson	CO	39.6139°N 102.3955°W	01:25–01:47	5.29 mi (8.51 km)	150 yd (140 m)
EF2	A strong tornado snapped nine wooden power poles and damaged an irrigation pivot.						
EFU	SSE of Kanorado	Sherman	KS	39.2998°N 102.0227°W	03:17–03:24	1.3 mi (2.1 km)	75 yd (69 m)
EFU	Dead tree limbs were snapped and swirl marks were left in the grass on an abandoned property.						

=== August 9 event ===
List of confirmed tornadoes – Wednesday, August 9, 2023
EF#	Location	County / Parish	State	Start Coord.	Time (UTC)	Path length	Max width
EF0	E of Aguadilla	Aguadilla	PR	18.4513°N 67.0931°W	17:00–17:05	0.25 mi (0.40 km)	15 yd (14 m)
EF0	A weak tornado tore aluminum roofing from a garage and damaged nearby vehicles.						
EF0	ENE of Flemingsburg	Fleming	KY	38.4464°N 83.6408°W	23:44	0.33 mi (0.53 km)	75 yd (69 m)
EF0	A brief tornado damaged two mobile homes, one of which had a board impaled through its roof. A barn collapsed, an open-air barn was damaged, and a vehicles were damaged by flying debris. A shed was also damaged, a goat enclosure was lofted over a fence and destroyed, and a flag pole was bent over. Trees were snapped or uprooted as well.						

=== August 10 event ===
List of confirmed tornadoes – Thursday, August 10, 2023
EF#	Location	County / Parish	State	Start Coord.	Time (UTC)	Path length	Max width
EF0	SE of Rogersville to SW of Athens	Limestone	AL	34.7805°N 87.2416°W	07:21–07:28	7.65 mi (12.31 km)	225 yd (206 m)
EF0	A high-end EF0 tornado uprooted and snapped trees along its path. Some of the trees fell onto and damaged homes, and others landed on docks at Wheeler Lake. Some power poles were downed as well.						
EF1	SW of Mickleton	Gloucester	NJ	39.7777°N 75.2698°W	18:08–18:10	0.66 mi (1.06 km)	70 yd (64 m)
EF1	The top of a camper was blown off, a couple of homes had roof and siding damage, and a gazebo was thrown into a swimming pool. A garden shed had shingles torn off, a fence was destroyed, and several trees were snapped or uprooted. Crop damage also occurred.						
EF1	E of Browns Mills	Burlington	NJ	39.97°N 74.53°W	18:08–18:12	0.31 mi (0.50 km)	100 yd (91 m)
EF1	A couple of homes had shingle and siding damage, and multiple trees were snapped or uprooted, one of which landed on and severely damaged a shed. Another shed was blown off its foundation and destroyed.						
EFU	E of Bancroft	Kingsbury	SD	44.473°N 97.6°W	00:41–00:42	0.55 mi (0.89 km)	25 yd (23 m)
EFU	A tornado tracked through open fields and marshlands, causing no damage.						
EF0	NW of Bryant	Clark	SD	44.6371°N 97.5324°W	00:47–00:49	0.89 mi (1.43 km)	90 yd (82 m)
EF0	Law enforcement and a storm chaser reported a brief tornado in an open field. No damage occurred.						
EFU	SE of Erwin	Kingsbury	SD	44.45°N 97.362°W	01:10–01:12	1.06 mi (1.71 km)	25 yd (23 m)
EFU	A tornado tracked through open fields, causing no damage.						

=== August 11 event ===
List of confirmed tornadoes – Friday, August 11, 2023
EF#	Location	County / Parish	State	Start Coord.	Time (UTC)	Path length	Max width
EF1	Perry	Shiawassee	MI	42.828°N 84.268°W	23:51–00:03	3.04 mi (4.89 km)	430 yd (390 m)
EF1	A tornado touched down west of Perry, downing trees and tree limbs before it moved directly through town. Additional trees were downed in Perry, and homes sustained shingle and siding damage. A metal building and some outbuilding structures had severe roof damage as well. The tornado lifted just after exiting town.						
EF0	North Salem	Linn	MO	40.03°N 93.00°W	04:18–04:21	1.26 mi (2.03 km)	30 yd (27 m)
EF0	A brief tornado damaged some trees and small outbuildings in the rural community of North Salem. A barndominium sustained damage to its roof, siding, and garage doors.						

=== August 12 event ===
List of confirmed tornadoes – Saturday, August 12, 2023
EF#	Location	County / Parish	State	Start Coord.	Time (UTC)	Path length	Max width
EF0	ENE of Wellsville to N of Buell	Montgomery	MO	39.1014°N 91.5007°W	08:34–08:38	2.54 mi (4.09 km)	40 yd (37 m)
EF0	A weak tornado downed numerous tree limbs along its path.						
EF1	Hickman	Fulton	KY	36.5677°N 89.1967°W	13:56–13:58	1.25 mi (2.01 km)	350 yd (320 m)
EF1	This tornado snapped or uprooted numerous trees in Hickman, a couple of which landed on homes and cars. Power poles were damaged and power lines were downed as well.						
EF1	N of Fulton	Hickman	KY	36.5562°N 88.8729°W	14:13–14:16	2.47 mi (3.98 km)	275 yd (251 m)
EF1	A grain bin was destroyed and dozens of trees were downed, a couple of which landed on houses.						
EF1	Southern Kenton	Hardin	OH	40.64°N 83.61°W	16:46–16:52	2.2 mi (3.5 km)	200 yd (180 m)
EF1	This tornado struck the south side of Kenton, where a few buildings had metal roofing torn off, a detached garage was flattened, and other garages were damaged. An outbuilding structure had its roof and second story removed, some homes had minor roof and fascia damage, and a sign attached to a flower shop was also damaged. Many trees and tree branches were downed as well. The tornado exited Kenton and caused some additional tree damage to the east of town before it dissipated.						
EF0	Northeastern Franklin	Williamson	TN	35.9341°N 86.8527°W	16:47–16:50	1.85 mi (2.98 km)	40 yd (37 m)
EF0	A weak, intermittent tornado moved through the northeast side of Franklin, where homes and some businesses had minor roof and exterior damage. Trees were downed as well, a few of which landed on houses.						
EF1	NNW of DeCliff	Marion	OH	40.6415°N 83.3633°W	17:13–17:14	0.14 mi (0.23 km)	75 yd (69 m)
EF1	An outbuilding had part of its roof torn off, with debris lofted into a nearby field. Several trees were damaged as well.						
EF0	SW of Elgin	Erie	PA	41.879°N 79.7884°W	17:24–17:25	0.45 mi (0.72 km)	20 yd (18 m)
EF0	A weak tornado damaged several trees, one of which fell onto a home and caused minor structural damage.						
EF0	ESE of Nashville	Holmes	OH	40.5886°N 82.0918°W	19:20–19:26	1.61 mi (2.59 km)	25 yd (23 m)
EF0	A few trees were snapped, uprooted, or had their tops sheared off.						
EF1	SE of Nescopeck	Luzerne	PA	41.02°N 76.18°W	20:32–20:37	3.25 mi (5.23 km)	150 yd (140 m)
EF1	This tornado snapped numerous trees and damaged the roof of a home. Another house was damaged by falling trees, and a nearby shed was destroyed. Tree limbs were impaled into the ground as well.						
EF0	N of Fishs Eddy to SE of East Branch	Delaware	NY	41.97°N 75.18°W	22:05–22:11	3.66 mi (5.89 km)	150 yd (140 m)
EF0	Some trees were snapped and power lines were damaged. Surveyors were unable to reach sections of the damage path due to steep terrain.						
EF1	SE of Athens	Athens	OH	39.2883°N 82.0671°W	23:33–23:43	2.32 mi (3.73 km)	300 yd (270 m)
EF1	Trees and power poles were snapped along the path.						
EF1	SE of Claysville to N of Prosperity	Washington	PA	40.1°N 80.37°W	00:08–00:23	4.45 mi (7.16 km)	30 yd (27 m)
EF1	A high-end EF1 tornado snapped numerous trees, and also damaged a shed and an outbuilding. A house had part of its roof torn off and also lost its attached patio roof.						
EF1	NNW of St. Clairsville	Belmont	OH	40.11°N 80.94°W	00:13–00:15	1.59 mi (2.56 km)	20 yd (18 m)
EF1	Hundreds of trees were snapped, three of which landed on houses. A barn was destroyed and another structure sustained soffit damage.						
EF1	W of Colver	Cambria	PA	40.5516°N 78.8199°W	00:49–00:51	0.32 mi (0.51 km)	100 yd (91 m)
EF1	A brief tornado snapped or uprooted hundreds of trees.						
EF0	SE of Colver	Cambria	PA	40.5317°N 78.7583°W	00:55–00:57	0.2 mi (0.32 km)	100 yd (91 m)
EF0	This brief tornado uprooted trees, damaged a house, and blew the roof off of a barn.						
EF0	SE of Bridgewater	Litchfield	CT	41.51°N 73.33°W	01:00–01:05	0.75 mi (1.21 km)	30 yd (27 m)
EF0	A weak tornado broke large branches off of trees before it moved into an open field and dissipated.						

=== August 13 event ===
List of confirmed tornadoes – Sunday, August 13, 2023
EF#	Location	County / Parish	State	Start Coord.	Time (UTC)	Path length	Max width
EF0	NNW of Ames	Monroe	IL	38.167°N 90.057°W	22:35–22:36	0.38 mi (0.61 km)	10 yd (9.1 m)
EF0	A large metal shed was damaged and debris from the structure was thrown into a pond. A narrow path of crop damage was observed in a soybean field as well.						
EFU	Barstow area	San Bernardino	CA	34.892°N 116.988°W	23:44–23:46	Unknown	Unknown
EFU	A landspout tornado was photographed alongside the Mojave River. No damage was reported.						
EF0	WSW of Picture Rocks	Pima	AZ	32.3209°N 111.3535°W	01:09–01:11	0.1 mi (0.16 km)	25 yd (23 m)
EF0	A landspout tornado was observed and caught on video by trained spotters. No damage occurred.						
EF0	W of Kinbrae	Nobles	MN	43.82°N 95.51°W	00:14–00:17	0.98 mi (1.58 km)	50 yd (46 m)
EF0	A weak tornado struck a farmstead, where an outbuilding had metal paneling removed and a hoop barn collapsed. A pine tree was uprooted at another location and some tree branches were snapped.						

=== August 14 event ===
List of confirmed tornadoes – Monday, August 14, 2023
EF#	Location	County / Parish	State	Start Coord.	Time (UTC)	Path length	Max width
EFU	NNE of Cascade	Dubuque	IA	42.3382°N 90.9879°W	18:25–18:28	1.23 mi (1.98 km)	20 yd (18 m)
EFU	A brief tornado was photographed and caught on video as it moved over open farmland. No damage occurred.						
EFU	NE of Ohio	Lee	IL	41.6226°N 89.4131°W	21:22–21:23	1.23 mi (1.98 km)	20 yd (18 m)
EFU	A brief landspout tornado occurred, causing no damage.						
EF0	NE of Brookville	Franklin	IN	39.4758°N 84.9611°W	22:32–22:39	2.8 mi (4.5 km)	150 yd (140 m)
EF0	A high-end EF0 tornado inflicted roof and siding damage to several homes. One house had considerable damage to its garage, including partial wall and roof collapse. A barn was destroyed, and multiple trees were uprooted or had branches snapped off.						
EF0	S of Trenton	Butler	OH	39.4457°N 84.4612°W	23:50–23:54	1.33 mi (2.14 km)	20 yd (18 m)
EF0	Tree and fence damage occurred at Chrisholm Historic Farmstead MetroPark, and small tree limbs were downed in a nearby neighborhood.						
EF1	NW of Beech Mountain	Avery, Watauga	NC	36.233°N 81.955°W	04:56–05:03	2.96 mi (4.76 km)	35 yd (32 m)
EF1	Numerous trees were snapped or uprooted by this rare tornado in the Appalachian region of North Carolina. This was only the second confirmed tornado in Avery County history and the first since 1965. For Watauga County, this was the third confirmed tornado in county history and the first since 1998.						

=== August 15 event ===
List of confirmed tornadoes – Tuesday, August 15, 2023
EF#	Location	County / Parish	State	Start Coord.	Time (UTC)	Path length	Max width
EFU	Northeastern Brownsville	Cameron	TX	25.9475°N 97.439°W	19:35–19:45	0.04 mi (0.064 km)	10 yd (9.1 m)
EFU	A landspout tornado touched down in an open field at the northeastern edge of Brownsville. No damage occurred.						
EFU	W of San Perlita	Willacy	TX	26.4962°N 97.6887°W	19:50–19:55	0.05 mi (0.080 km)	10 yd (9.1 m)
EFU	Public media showed a well-defined landspout tornado lofting dust. No damage occurred.						

=== August 16 event ===
List of confirmed tornadoes – Wednesday, August 16, 2023
EF#	Location	County / Parish	State	Start Coord.	Time (UTC)	Path length	Max width
EF0	Key West	Monroe	FL	24.5471°N 81.7867°W	13:55	0.01 mi (0.016 km)	20 yd (18 m)
EF0	A narrow waterspout moved onshore and quickly dissipated without doing any damage.						

=== August 17 event ===
List of confirmed tornadoes – Thursday, August 17, 2023
EF#	Location	County / Parish	State	Start Coord.	Time (UTC)	Path length	Max width
EFU	WSW of Artesia	Eddy	NM	32.8166°N 104.4066°W	00:17–00:22	Unknown	Unknown
EFU	A landspout tornado was photographed. No damage occurred.						

=== August 18 event ===
List of confirmed tornadoes – Friday, August 18, 2023
EF#	Location	County / Parish	State	Start Coord.	Time (UTC)	Path length	Max width
EF1	SE of Windham to N of Scotland	Windham	CT	41.6914°N 72.1191°W	11:53–11:59	2.7 mi (4.3 km)	200 yd (180 m)
EF1	Two homes sustained gutter damage, and more than 100 trees were downed or had their tops snapped off.						
EF2	Eastern Scituate to North Providence	Providence	RI	41.7987°N 71.5741°W	12:40–12:57	9.1 mi (14.6 km)	250 yd (230 m)
EF2	An intermittent low-end EF2 tornado touched down at the eastern outskirts of Scituate, where hundreds of large trees were snapped or uprooted in a wooded area. A house in this area sustained roof and chimney damage, suffered broken windows, and had an exterior door dislodged from its framing. The tornado then entered Johnston and crossed I-295, where a car was lofted into the air and dropped back down onto the highway, injuring the driver. Many large trees were downed in Johnston, some of which landed on homes and vehicles. A few homes had roof damage as well, and a metal stop sign pole was bent in half. The tornado impacted North Providence before it dissipated, toppling numerous additional trees onto houses, two of which were left uninhabitable. This was only the second F2/EF2 tornado in Rhode Island history, with the first striking Cranston and Providence on August 7, 1986.						
EF1	North Attleboro to Southern Mansfield	Bristol	MA	41.9418°N 71.3813°W	13:07–13:22	7.6 mi (12.2 km)	80 yd (73 m)
EF1	The storm that produced the EF2 Rhode Island tornado crossed into Massachusetts and produced another tornado in North Attleboro. Many trees were snapped or uprooted, and a house had one of its windows blown in. The tornado then lifted briefly before touching down again at the south edge of Mansfield, where several large trees had their tops snapped off, one of which fell on a car. An 1,000-pound air conditioning unit was knocked over on the roof of a commercial building as well.						
EF0	Southeastern Stoughton	Norfolk	MA	42.1146°N 71.0730°W	13:37–13:39	0.1 mi (0.16 km)	35 yd (32 m)
EF0	This weak tornado briefly touched down in the southeastern part of Stoughton. Part of a fence was blown over and multiple trees were downed, one of which fell onto a shed.						
EF1	Southern Weymouth	Norfolk	MA	42.1815°N 70.9526°W	13:52–13:55	0.35 mi (0.56 km)	100 yd (91 m)
EF1	Numerous trees were snapped or uprooted in the southern part of Weymouth, and a house had shingles torn from its roof. A three-inch diameter tree limb was thrown about 120 yards (110 m) and driven into the ground to a depth of 2 feet (0.61 m).						

=== August 19 event ===
List of confirmed tornadoes – Saturday, August 19, 2023
EF#	Location	County / Parish	State	Start Coord.	Time (UTC)	Path length	Max width
EFU	E of Fresno	Fresno	CA	36.75°N 119.66°W	01:12	Unknown	Unknown
EFU	A short-lived tornado was reported. No damage occurred.						

=== August 22 event ===
Event was associated with Tropical Storm Harold.

List of confirmed tornadoes – Tuesday, August 22, 2023
EF#	Location	County / Parish	State	Start Coord.	Time (UTC)	Path length	Max width
EF0	S of George West	Live Oak	TX	28.25°N 98.1°W	16:05–16:15	0.73 mi (1.17 km)	700 yd (640 m)
EF0	A weak tornado snapped large branches and split a few trees.						
EF0	N of Orange Grove	Jim Wells	TX	28.0055°N 97.9344°W	16:57–17:01	0.18 mi (0.29 km)	30 yd (27 m)
EF0	A few large tree limbs were snapped as a result of this brief, weak tornado.						

=== August 24 event ===
List of confirmed tornadoes – Thursday, August 24, 2023
EF#	Location	County / Parish	State	Start Coord.	Time (UTC)	Path length	Max width
EFU	S of Voltaire	McHenry	ND	47.96°N 100.82°W	19:38–19:42	0.8 mi (1.3 km)	50 yd (46 m)
EFU	A landspout tornado occurred in an open field and impacted no structures. No damage occurred.						
EFU	SW of Voltaire	McHenry	ND	47.93°N 100.97°W	19:54–19:56	0.55 mi (0.89 km)	50 yd (46 m)
EFU	A second landspout tornado occurred southwest of Voltaire in an open field, again producing no known damage.						
EF0	East Naples	Collier	FL	26.1455°N 81.7563°W	20:55–20:58	0.76 mi (1.22 km)	50 yd (46 m)
EF0	A brief tornado damaged trees near Walker Technical College and surrounding areas.						
EF1	WNW of Comstock Park to Northeastern Belmont	Kent	MI	43.0642°N 85.7414°W	00:15–00:30	8.7 mi (14.0 km)	100 yd (91 m)
EF1	A high-end EF1 tornado tracked through the northern suburbs of Grand Rapids. Sheds and outbuildings were damaged and apple trees were snapped at an orchard near the beginning of the path. The tornado then entered Comstock Park, where a small cinder-block building that housed a playground equipment company was destroyed, a few neighboring businesses had significant roof damage, and a dumpster was tossed. Homes in Comstock Park suffered major damage to their roofs, garages, and exteriors, and many trees were snapped or uprooted. The tornado crossed into Belmont, where numerous additional trees were snapped or uprooted, homes sustained roof damage, and a garden shed was destroyed before the tornado dissipated.						
EF2	SW of Williamston to WSW of Fowlerville	Ingham, Livingston	MI	42.6535°N 84.3131°W	01:29–01:42	12.02 mi (19.34 km)	500 yd (460 m)
EF2	2 deaths – This strong tornado traveled along and across I-96 near Williamston and Webberville, flipping or tossing several vehicles and causing two fatalities. Hundreds of large trees were snapped, and some wooded areas suffered total deforestation. Several large barns and outbuildings were destroyed, and crops were scoured in farm fields. Multiple homes had significant roof, siding, and window damage as well. Four people were injured.						
EF0	Southwestern Canton	Wayne	MI	42.2968°N 83.5003°W	02:19–02:21	1.7 mi (2.7 km)	200 yd (180 m)
EF0	Dozens of trees were downed or had their tops sheared off in the southwestern part of Canton. One tree fell onto a house, and some power poles were pushed over as well.						
EF1	Southern Belleville	Wayne	MI	42.1983°N 83.5074°W	02:23–02:26	3.01 mi (4.84 km)	200 yd (180 m)
EF1	A tornado moved through the southern edge of Belleville, where numerous trees and tree branches were downed, a few of which landed on homes. Some mobile homes in a mobile home park had fascia and siding ripped off. A garage also sustained siding damage.						
EF1	S of Newport	Monroe	MI	42.0086°N 83.3638°W	02:38–02:43	4.88 mi (7.85 km)	200 yd (180 m)
EF1	This tornado impacted a mobile home park, where several mobile homes sustained roof damage or had their roofs torn off entirely, and one was flipped over onto a neighboring mobile home. Tree limbs were downed near a Meijer distribution center, and power poles were leaned over as well.						
EF1	South Rockwood	Monroe, Wayne	MI	42.0556°N 83.1882°W	02:39–02:45	5.42 mi (8.72 km)	200 yd (180 m)
EF1	Tree limbs were downed, multiple trees were uprooted or snapped, and some houses had roof shingles torn off before the tornado moved directly through South Rockwood. Multiple homes in town sustained roof damage, and an older house had its roof blown off. Trees and large tree branches were downed, and a few branches landed on houses. A warehouse building partially collapsed and had metal garage doors blown in as well. The tornado exited South Rockwood and crossed into Wayne County, downing more tree branches at the Lake Erie Metropark Golf Course before it dissipated over the Detroit River.						
EF1	Southern Gibraltar	Wayne	MI	42.0902°N 83.2098°W	02:43–02:45	1.43 mi (2.30 km)	300 yd (270 m)
EF1	This tornado moved through the south side of Gibraltar, where trees were snapped or uprooted and large tree limbs were downed. The tornado then crossed from the mainland onto Edmond and Horse Islands, where additional trees and large tree branches were snapped. One tree fell onto a trailer, and a few branches landed on vehicles. A house suffered minor fascia damage as well before the tornado dissipated over the Detroit River.						
EF1	N of Elmore to NNW of Lindsey	Ottawa, Sandusky	OH	41.5018°N 83.2995°W	03:08–03:15	4.49 mi (7.23 km)	100 yd (91 m)
EF1	In Ottawa County, this tornado damaged a greenhouse and downed multiple trees and tree branches. Three large trees fell onto a house and damaged its roof, and broken tree limbs landed on several other homes. In Sandusky County, a house had siding ripped off, several more trees were downed, and power lines were snapped before the tornado dissipated.						
EF1	Beulah Beach	Erie	OH	41.3952°N 82.4364°W	03:46–03:47	0.28 mi (0.45 km)	100 yd (91 m)
EF1	Trees were uprooted and large tree limbs were snapped in Beulah Beach. Several of the tree limbs fell onto homes, one of which was partially destroyed.						
EF1	Eastern Cleveland	Cuyahoga	OH	41.5057°N 81.6394°W	02:59–03:02	0.79 mi (1.27 km)	150 yd (140 m)
EF1	A brief high-end EF1 tornado touched down east-southeast of downtown Cleveland, impacting the Fairfax neighborhood. A church had much of its roof torn off, and metal light poles were bent to the ground. Numerous trees were downed, and several homes had minor damage. The tornado dissipated near the Cleveland Clinic. This was the first tornado to strike in the city limits of Cleveland since 1985.						
EF0	W of Grafton	Lorain	OH	41.279°N 82.121°W	03:00–03:01	0.25 mi (0.40 km)	50 yd (46 m)
EF0	A house lost part of its roof and had its porch roof blown off as a result of this high-end EF0 tornado. Multiple trees were downed or had their tops snapped off. One tree landed on two vehicles and punctured holes in the roof of another home.						
EF0	Wellington	Lorain	OH	41.1761°N 82.2234°W	03:05–03:06	1.08 mi (1.74 km)	100 yd (91 m)
EF0	This tornado moved directly through Wellington, where trees were downed or had their tops snapped off. Tree branches landed on homes in town, and a large tree was uprooted and toppled over onto a house. Some power lines were downed as well.						
EF1	Mentor	Lake	OH	41.654°N 81.3742°W	03:06–03:09	3.27 mi (5.26 km)	150 yd (140 m)
EF1	A high-end EF1 tornado snapped or uprooted numerous large trees in Mentor, several of which landed on and damaged homes. Power lines were also damaged.						
EF2	Southern Warrensville Heights to Bedford Heights	Cuyahoga	OH	41.4285°N 81.5144°W	03:07–03:10	1.52 mi (2.45 km)	100 yd (91 m)
EF2	This strong tornado caused damage in the eastern suburbs of Cleveland. It touched down in the southern part of Warrensville Heights, where a car dealership and multiple buildings in an industrial park sustained heavy roof damage. Entering Bedford Heights, the tornado severely damaged two industrial buildings, both of which had exterior walls collapsed and suffered damage to metal support beams. Large trees were snapped or uprooted along the path, some of which fell onto homes.						
EF1	Spencer	Medina	OH	41.1104°N 82.1402°W	03:11–03:13	1.53 mi (2.46 km)	200 yd (180 m)
EF1	Several trees in Spencer were snapped or uprooted, and a home had minor roof shingle damage. The tornado left swirl marks in corn fields outside of town.						
EF1	Southern Bainbridge	Geauga	OH	41.3731°N 81.3581°W	03:16–03:18	1.81 mi (2.91 km)	100 yd (91 m)
EF1	This tornado tracked through subdivisions in the southern part of Bainbridge, snapping or uprooting more than 100 trees. One tree was blown over onto a house, and some power poles were also downed.						
EF1	N of Aquilla	Geauga	OH	41.5602°N 81.1791°W	03:18–03:20	1.18 mi (1.90 km)	175 yd (160 m)
EF1	A high-end EF1 tornado snapped or uprooted numerous trees and damaged power lines.						
EF2	N of Middlefield	Geauga	OH	41.4897°N 81.0887°W	03:22–03:23	0.69 mi (1.11 km)	100 yd (91 m)
EF2	A brief low-end EF2 tornado completely destroyed a large barn. Several other barns suffered extensive damage, and trees were downed as well.						
EF0	SE of Bristolville	Trumbull	OH	41.37°N 80.85°W	03:35–03:37	1.95 mi (3.14 km)	100 yd (91 m)
EF0	Multiple homes suffered shingle and siding damage as a result of this high-end EF0 tornado, and one house had its carport collapse. Tree damage also occurred, and corn was damaged in farm fields.						

=== August 25 event ===
List of confirmed tornadoes – Friday, August 25, 2023
EF#	Location	County / Parish	State	Start Coord.	Time (UTC)	Path length	Max width
EF1	Western Connellsville to NW of Mill Run	Fayette	PA	40.0132°N 79.6077°W	05:28–05:33	6.21 mi (9.99 km)	60 yd (55 m)
EF1	A tornado touched down on the west side of Connellsville, where a few trees were uprooted and many large tree branches were snapped. It exited Connellsville and followed the Youghiogheny River as it moved to the southeast, downing more trees and tree limbs. Two cabins were damaged by falling trees at Camp Carmel before the tornado dissipated.						
EF2	Mill Run	Fayette	PA	39.945°N 79.4664°W	05:34–05:37	1.96 mi (3.15 km)	300 yd (270 m)
EF2	This tornado downed trees and damaged some outbuildings shortly after it touched down. It strengthened as it tracked southeastward through the community of Mill Run and impacted Yogi Bear's Jellystone Park resort and campground, where hundreds of large trees were snapped or uprooted. Multiple RVs, cars, cabins, shelters, and other structures were crushed or damaged by falling trees at this location. The tornado then exited the campground and continued to the southeast, snapping power poles and many additional large trees in a wooded area. Near the end of its damage path, the tornado rolled a mobile home and struck two farmsteads, where a few barns, outbuildings, and silos were damaged and sheet metal debris was scattered into fields. Six people were injured.						

=== August 26 event ===
List of confirmed tornadoes – Saturday, August 26, 2023
EF#	Location	County / Parish	State	Start Coord.	Time (UTC)	Path length	Max width
EF0	SSW of Marietta	Fulton	IL	40.4694°N 90.3946°W	19:30–19:35	0.37 mi (0.60 km)	20 yd (18 m)
EF0	An emergency manager observed a brief landspout tornado. No damage occurred.						
EFU	WSW of Marietta	Fulton	IL	40.4899°N 90.4043°W	19:40–19:45	0.51 mi (0.82 km)	20 yd (18 m)
EFU	A brief landspout tornado caused no damage.						
EF0	Southern Coward	Florence	SC	33.97°N 79.75°W	21:00	0.03 mi (0.048 km)	15 yd (14 m)
EF0	A brief, weak tornado touched down on the south side of Coward and did minor damage to the siding and soffits of two strip malls.						

=== August 27 event ===
List of confirmed tornadoes – Sunday, August 27, 2023
EF#	Location	County / Parish	State	Start Coord.	Time (UTC)	Path length	Max width
EFU	SE of Snowville	Box Elder	UT	41.8997°N 112.5724°W	23:50	Unknown	Unknown
EFU	A tornado had several photos and videos taken of it. No damage occurred.						

=== August 29 event ===
List of confirmed tornadoes – Tuesday, August 29, 2023
EF#	Location	County / Parish	State	Start Coord.	Time (UTC)	Path length	Max width
EFU	Western Lubbock	Lubbock	TX	33.561°N 101.973°W	22:04	Unknown	Unknown
EFU	A short-lived landspout remained over an open field.						

=== August 30 event ===
Event was associated with Hurricane Idalia.

List of confirmed tornadoes – Wednesday, August 30, 2023
EF#	Location	County / Parish	State	Start Coord.	Time (UTC)	Path length	Max width
EF0	W of Pyles Marsh to SE of Bladen	Glynn	GA	31.1229°N 81.5535°W	11:30–11:39	9.78 mi (15.74 km)	50 yd (46 m)
EF0	A weak tornado downed power lines and damaged some trees as it impacted the small communities of Fancy Bluff, Deerwood, and Georgetown.						
EF1	Brunswick to S of Sterling	Glynn	GA	31.1505°N 81.4935°W	11:40–11:49	7.91 mi (12.73 km)	300 yd (270 m)
EF1	This tornado touched down in Brunswick, where multiple trees were snapped or uprooted. Numerous tree branches were also snapped, a few of which landed on structures, and one branch was impaled through the windshield of a truck. A few buildings suffered minor damage, power lines were downed, and a billboard and some fencing was knocked over. A storage shed had its roof blown off as well. The tornado exited Brunswick and dissipated near Sterling.						
EF1	Sea Island	Glynn	GA	31.1591°N 81.4079°W	12:05–12:07	0.32 mi (0.51 km)	50 yd (46 m)
EF1	A brief tornado uprooted several hardwood trees.						
EF0	NNE of Fleming	Liberty	GA	31.9002°N 81.4136°W	14:00–14:03	0.53 mi (0.85 km)	100 yd (91 m)
EF0	Trees were uprooted or snapped and a small shed was destroyed.						
EF0	Goose Creek	Berkeley	SC	32.9873°N 80.0406°W	16:22–16:23	0.03 mi (0.048 km)	50 yd (46 m)
EF0	A very brief tornado flipped a car on US 52, injuring two people. Video of the car being flipped was posted on social media.						
EF1	NE of Turbeville	Clarendon	SC	33.9047°N 79.983°W	18:57–19:00	0.73 mi (1.17 km)	125 yd (114 m)
EF1	A brief low-end EF1 tornado snapped or uprooted numerous trees and downed tree limbs.						
EF0	Northeastern Mount Pleasant	Charleston	SC	32.8782°N 79.7582°W	19:30–19:33	2.74 mi (4.41 km)	100 yd (91 m)
EF0	A high-end EF0 tornado caused minor roof, window, and chimney damage to a few homes as it moved through subdivisions in the northeastern part of Mount Pleasant. Patio furniture was tossed, a porta-potty was lifted, and a car was pushed into a tree. Many trees were snapped or uprooted along the path.						
EF1	NNE of Huger to E of Limerick	Berkeley	SC	33.1056°N 79.7617°W	20:59–21:04	1.88 mi (3.03 km)	100 yd (91 m)
EF1	Several trees were snapped or uprooted in a wooded, marshy area.						
EF0	Eastern St. James	Brunswick	NC	33.9432°N 78.0771°W	22:14–22:15	0.43 mi (0.69 km)	20 yd (18 m)
EF0	A brief and weak tornado snapped branches off of trees in a subdivision on the east side of St. James.						
EF0	NE of St. James	Brunswick	NC	33.9601°N 78.0811°W	22:45–22:46	0.32 mi (0.51 km)	20 yd (18 m)
EF0	A brief tornado damaged the roof of a veterinarian hospital a nearby building, downed a large tree, and ripped an air conditioning unit off the top of another building.						
EF1	SSE of Easy Hill	Brunswick	NC	34.1408°N 77.9647°W	23:25–23:27	0.25 mi (0.40 km)	40 yd (37 m)
EF1	Numerous trees were snapped by this high-end EF1 tornado, including one that knocked over a hunter's tree stand.						
EF1	Southern Myrtle Grove	New Hanover	NC	34.0891°N 77.8835°W	23:31–23:35	1.54 mi (2.48 km)	30 yd (27 m)
EF1	A waterspout moved ashore and became an EF1 tornado as it impacted the southern part of Myrtle Grove, snapping or uprooting many trees, including a couple of trees that landed on and damaged sheds. Several other trees fell onto power lines, and a house had a piece of aluminum cornice ripped off as well.						
EF0	Eastern North Myrtle Beach	Horry	SC	33.8369°N 78.611°W	02:12–02:14	1.62 mi (2.61 km)	30 yd (27 m)
EF0	A waterspout moved ashore in the eastern part of North Myrtle Beach as a high-end EF0 tornado. A house had its poorly attached roof blown off, and several other homes sustained less severe damage to roofing, siding, porch overhangs, and balcony railings. Two dumpsters were flipped over, and a few trees and numerous large tree limbs were downed.						

== See also ==
- Tornadoes of 2023
- List of United States tornadoes in June 2023
- List of United States tornadoes from September to December 2023
