= James, North Carolina =

James, North Carolina may refer to:

- James City, North Carolina
- St. James, North Carolina
