= Sollitt, Illinois =

- Unincorporated community
- Location within Illinois Location within the United States
- Coordinates: 41°17′36″N 87°38′05″W
- Country: United States
- State: Illinois
- County: Kankakee
- Township: Yellowhead
- Named for: John Sollitt
- Elevation: 712 ft (217 m)

Population (2000)
  - Total: <100
- Time zone: UTC-6 (CST)
  - Summer (DST): UTC-5 (CDT)
- Postal code: 60401
- Area code: 815

Sollitt is an unincorporated community located in Kankakee County, Illinois, United States. It was founded by John Sollitt, who purchased the land from the United States Government in 1853. The town is located off Illinois Route 1 and County Line Road and is north of Grant Park and south of Beecher. Sollitt has fewer than 100 people within the town.

When the railroad came through, Sollitt paid $1000 to locate a station there. As Sollitt later recounted, "They named it Sollitt and there is quite a village there now."

A post office was opened at Sollitt in 1884.

A 1932 report from the Illinois Commerce Commission reported that Sollitt is "an unincorporated community having a population of about fifty-three inhabitants."
