= Illiana Heights, Illinois =

- Unincorporated community
- Location within Illinois Location within the United States
- Coordinates: 41°10′08″N 87°32′35″W
- Country: United States
- State: Illinois
- County: Kankakee
- Township: Momence
- Elevation: 630 ft (190 m)
- Time zone: UTC-6 (Central (CST))
  - Summer (DST): UTC-5 (CDT)
- Area codes: 815 & 779
- GNIS feature ID: 410754

Illiana Heights is an unincorporated community in Kankakee County, Illinois, United States. The community is located on the Kankakee River 6.3 miles (10.1 km) east of Momence.
