= Sherburnville, Illinois =

- Unincorporated community
- Location within Illinois Location within the United States
- Coordinates: 41°13′44″N 87°32′41″W
- Country: United States
- State: Illinois
- County: Kankakee
- Elevation: 676 ft (206 m)
- Time zone: UTC-6 (Central (CST))
  - Summer (DST): UTC-5 (CDT)
- Area codes: 815 & 779
- GNIS feature ID: 418352

Sherburnville is an unincorporated community in Yellowhead Township, Kankakee County, Illinois, United States. The community is on Illinois Route 17 5.3 miles (8.5 km) east of Grant Park.
