= Yellowhead Township, Kankakee County, Illinois =

Yellowhead Township
- Township
- Location in Kankakee County

- Kankakee County's location in Illinois
- Coordinates: 41°15′08″N 87°35′46″W
- Country: United States
- State: Illinois
- County: Kankakee
- Established: May 9, 1853

Government
  - Supervisor: Joseph Fetcho

Area
  - Total: 43.93 sq mi (113.8 km^{2})
  - Land: 43.90 sq mi (113.7 km^{2})
  - Water: 0.03 sq mi (0.078 km^{2}) 0.06%
- Elevation: 696 ft (212 m)

Population (2020)
  - Total: 2,573
  - Density: 58.61/sq mi (22.63/km^{2})
- Time zone: UTC-6 (CST)
  - Summer (DST): UTC-5 (CDT)
- ZIP codes: 60401, 60940, 60954
- FIPS code: 17-091-83856

Yellowhead Township is one of seventeen townships in Kankakee County, Illinois, USA. As of the 2020 census, its population was 2,573 and it contained 1,059 housing units. Yellowhead Township derives its name from the Potawatomi warrior, Yellow Head, whose village was located at what is now Yellowhead Point.

== Geography ==
According to the 2021 census gazetteer files, Yellowhead Township has a total area of 43.93 square miles (113.78 km^{2}), of which 43.90 square miles (113.70 km^{2}) (or 99.94%) is land and 0.03 square miles (0.08 km^{2}) (or 0.06%) is water.

=== Cities, towns, villages ===
- Grant Park

=== Unincorporated towns ===
- Puder at 41.245034°N 87.606704°W
- Sherburnville at 41.228923°N 87.544758°W
- Sollitt at 41.293367°N 87.634761°W

(This list is based on USGS data and may include former settlements.)

=== Extinct towns ===
- Judson at 41.252256°N 87.642260°W

(These towns are listed as "historical" by the USGS.)

=== Adjacent townships ===
- Washington Township, Will County (north)
- West Creek Township, Lake County, Indiana (east)
- Momence Township (south)
- Ganeer Township (southwest)
- Sumner Township (west)

=== Cemeteries ===
The township contains these three cemeteries: Saint Paul Lutheran, Scherburnville Christian and Union Corner.

=== Major highways ===
- Illinois Route 1

=== Airports and landing strips ===
- Love Field
- Mussman Airport

== Demographics ==
As of the 2020 census there were 2,573 people, 867 households, and 621 families residing in the township. The population density was 58.57 inhabitants per square mile (22.61/km^{2}). There were 1,059 housing units at an average density of 24.11 per square mile (9.31/km^{2}). The racial makeup of the township was 89.93% White, 0.35% African American, 0.23% Native American, 0.04% Asian, 0.08% Pacific Islander, 2.68% from other races, and 6.68% from two or more races. Hispanic or Latino of any race were 8.39% of the population.

There were 867 households, out of which 29.20% had children under the age of 18 living with them, 62.05% were married couples living together, 4.84% had a female householder with no spouse present, and 28.37% were non-families. 26.20% of all households were made up of individuals, and 9.70% had someone living alone who was 65 years of age or older. The average household size was 2.92 and the average family size was 3.52.

The township's age distribution consisted of 29.8% under the age of 18, 4.7% from 18 to 24, 21.5% from 25 to 44, 27.5% from 45 to 64, and 16.4% who were 65 years of age or older. The median age was 38.9 years. For every 100 females, there were 107.1 males. For every 100 females age 18 and over, there were 103.9 males.

The median income for a household in the township was $72,386, and the median income for a family was $89,125. Males had a median income of $61,094 versus $31,648 for females. The per capita income for the township was $30,947. About 3.7% of families and 6.9% of the population were below the poverty line, including 6.0% of those under age 18 and 6.7% of those age 65 or over.

Historical population
Census	Pop.	Note	%±
2000	2,556		—
2010	2,700		5.6%
2020	2,573		−4.7%
U.S. Decennial Census

== Government ==
The township is governed by an elected Town Board of a supervisor and four trustees. The township also has an elected assessor, clerk, highway commissioner and supervisor. The township office is located at 7090 North Bull Creek Road, Grant Park, Illinois 60940.

== Political districts ==
- Illinois's 2nd congressional district
- State House District 79
- State Senate District 40

== School districts ==
- Grant Park Community Unit School District 6
