= Momence Township, Kankakee County, Illinois =

Momence Township
- Township
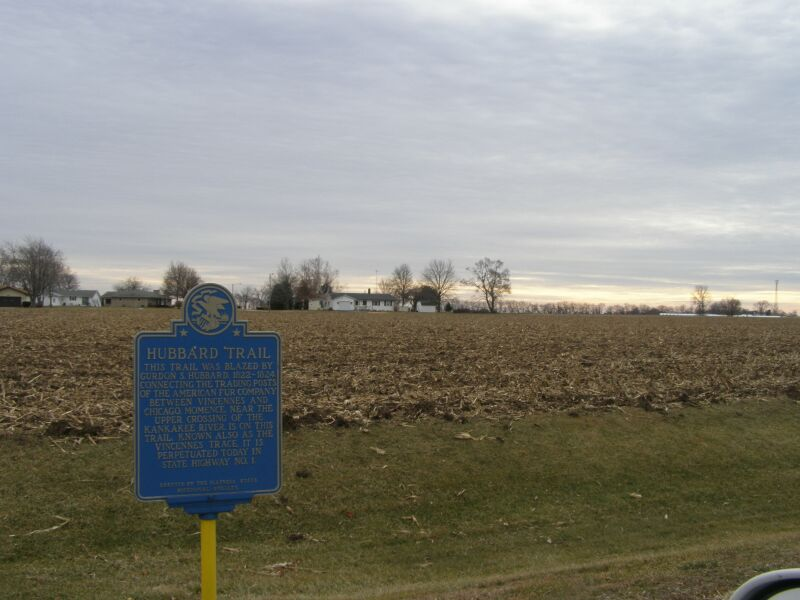
- Hubbard Trail Marker in Momence Township, Kankakee County, Illinois

- Location in Kankakee County

- Kankakee County's location in Illinois
- Coordinates: 41°09′45″N 87°35′45″W
- Country: United States
- State: Illinois
- County: Kankakee
- Established: May 9, 1853

Government
  - Supervisor: David Clifton

Area
  - Total: 42.92 sq mi (111.2 km^{2})
  - Land: 42.45 sq mi (109.9 km^{2})
  - Water: 0.47 sq mi (1.2 km^{2}) 1.09%
- Elevation: 620 ft (189 m)

Population (2020)
  - Total: 3,586
  - Density: 84.48/sq mi (32.62/km^{2})
- Time zone: UTC-6 (CST)
  - Summer (DST): UTC-5 (CDT)
- ZIP codes: 60940, 60954
- FIPS code: 17-091-49906

Momence Township is one of seventeen townships in Kankakee County, Illinois, USA. As of the 2020 census, its population was 3,586 and it contained 1,574 housing units. Momence Township is one of the original six townships of Kankakee County, Illinois; when first created the township encompassed land now in Sumner, Ganeer, and Pembroke Townships. It was a township of Will County until Kankakee County was created.

== Geography ==
According to the 2021 census gazetteer files, Momence Township has a total area of 42.92 square miles (111.16 km^{2}), of which 42.45 square miles (109.94 km^{2}) (or 98.91%) is land and 0.47 square miles (1.22 km^{2}) (or 1.09%) is water.

=== Cities, towns, villages ===
- Momence (east half)

=== Unincorporated towns ===
- Edgetown at 41.179478°N 87.575591°W
- Garden of Eden at 41.169756°N 87.561702°W
- Illiana Heights at 41.168923°N 87.543090°W
- Lake at 41.168923°N 87.550868°W
- Litchfield at 41.163367°N 87.586702°W
- River at 41.159201°N 87.593369°W
- Shadow Lawn at 41.159756°N 87.571702°W
- Ward at 41.168923°N 87.628092°W
- Woodland at 41.162256°N 87.549201°W

(This list is based on USGS data and may include former settlements.)

=== Adjacent townships ===
- Yellowhead Township (north)
- West Creek Township, Lake County, Indiana (northeast)
- Lake Township, Newton County, Indiana (east)
- Pembroke Township (south)
- Ganeer Township (west)
- Sumner Township (northwest)

=== Cemeteries ===
The township contains these two cemeteries: Saint Judes and Shrontz.

=== Major highways ===
- Illinois Route 114

=== Airports and landing strips ===
- Johnson Airport

=== Rivers ===
- Kankakee River

=== Lakes ===
- Mirror Lake

=== Landmarks ===
- Island Park

== Demographics ==
As of the 2020 census there were 3,586 people, 1,408 households, and 769 families residing in the township. The population density was 83.55 inhabitants per square mile (32.26/km^{2}). There were 1,574 housing units at an average density of 36.67 per square mile (14.16/km^{2}). The racial makeup of the township was 79.06% White, 2.93% African American, 0.73% Native American, 0.39% Asian, 0.03% Pacific Islander, 8.45% from other races, and 8.42% from two or more races. Hispanic or Latino of any race were 15.59% of the population.

There were 1,408 households, out of which 25.10% had children under the age of 18 living with them, 37.86% were married couples living together, 9.73% had a female householder with no spouse present, and 45.38% were non-families. 37.70% of all households were made up of individuals, and 19.20% had someone living alone who was 65 years of age or older. The average household size was 2.30 and the average family size was 3.08.

The township's age distribution consisted of 20.9% under the age of 18, 7.6% from 18 to 24, 23.7% from 25 to 44, 27.6% from 45 to 64, and 20.3% who were 65 years of age or older. The median age was 43.4 years. For every 100 females, there were 133.7 males. For every 100 females age 18 and over, there were 120.8 males.

The median income for a household in the township was $44,651, and the median income for a family was $60,694. Males had a median income of $35,510 versus $24,269 for females. The per capita income for the township was $24,494. About 2.9% of families and 10.9% of the population were below the poverty line, including 1.2% of those under age 18 and 9.4% of those age 65 or over.

Historical population
Census	Pop.	Note	%±
2000	3,835		—
2010	3,820		−0.4%
2020	3,586		−6.1%
U.S. Decennial Census

== Government ==
The township is governed by an elected Town Board of a Supervisor and four Trustees. The Township also has an elected Assessor, Clerk, Highway Commissioner and Supervisor. The Township Office is located at 203 East River Street, Momence, IL 60954.

== Political districts ==
- Illinois's 11th congressional district
- State House District 79
- State Senate District 40

== School districts ==
- Momence Community Unit School District 1
