= Symerton, Illinois =

Symerton
- Village
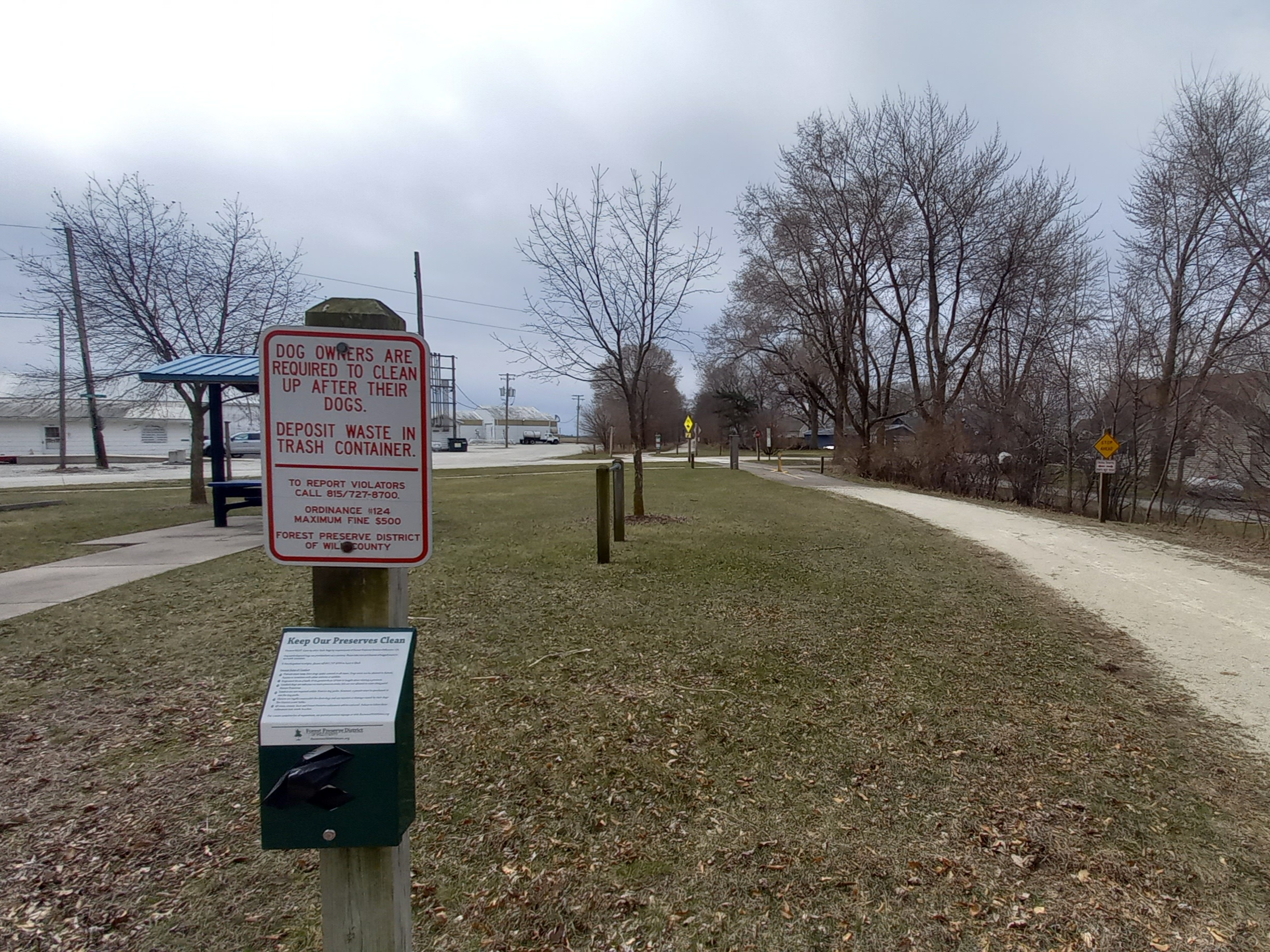
- Wauponsee Glacial Trail at Symerton

- Location of Symerton in Will County, Illinois.

- Location of Illinois in the United States
- Coordinates: 41°19′41″N 88°3′16″W
- Country: United States
- State: Illinois
- County: Will

Area
  - Total: 0.16 sq mi (0.41 km^{2})
  - Land: 0.16 sq mi (0.41 km^{2})
  - Water: 0 sq mi (0.00 km^{2})

Population (2020)
  - Total: 128
  - Density: 817.3/sq mi (315.55/km^{2})
- Time zone: UTC-6 (CST)
  - Summer (DST): UTC-5 (CDT)
- ZIP Code(s): 60481
- FIPS code: 17-74275
- Wikimedia Commons: Symerton, Illinois

Symerton is a village in Will County, Illinois, United States. The population was 128 at the 2020 census. By population, it is the smallest village in Will County.

== History ==
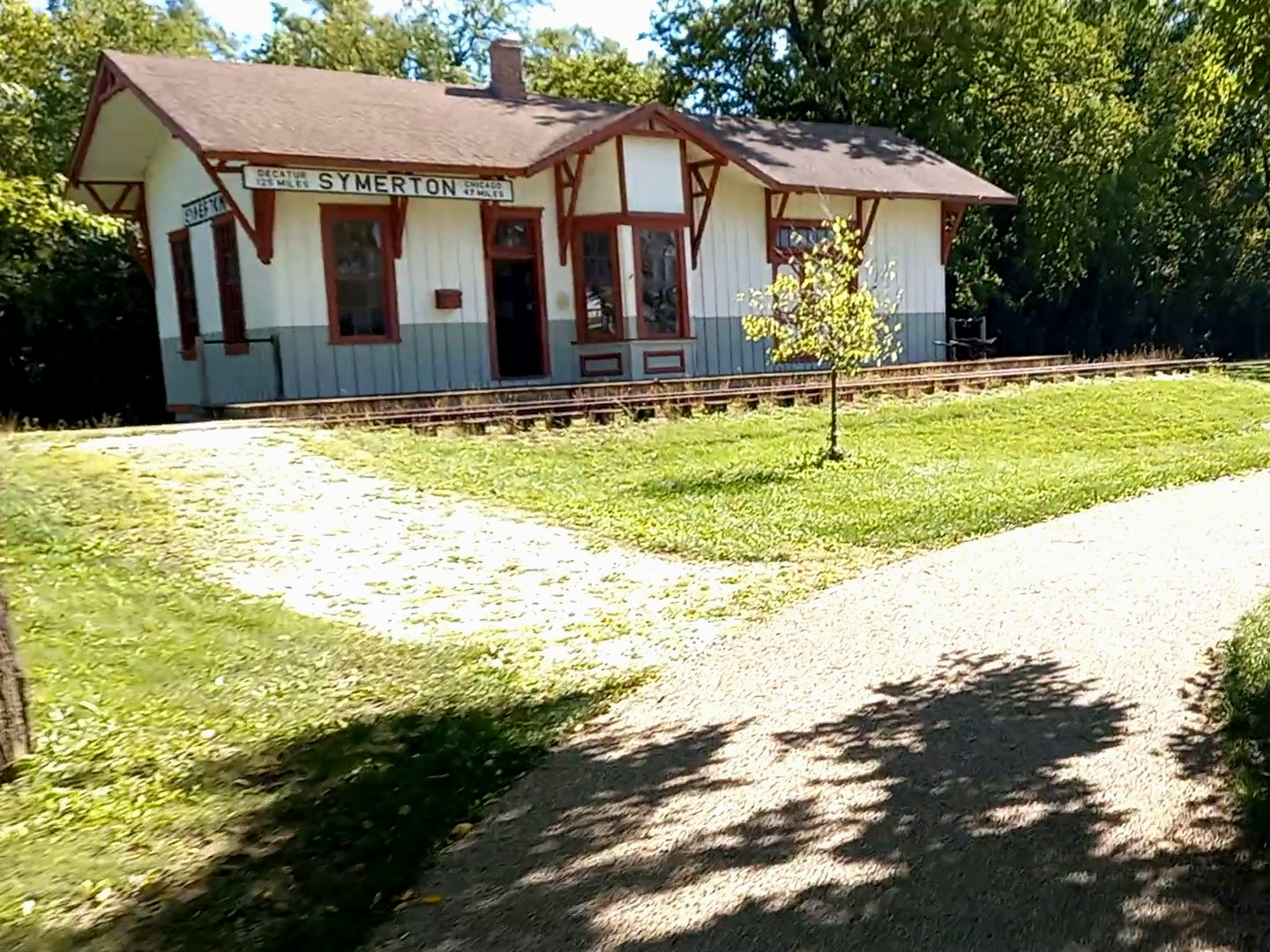
Symertion station house, now preserved in Lockport.

Symerton was served by the Wabash Railroad. The Will County Historical Society moved the depot to Lockport, Illinois, to serve as part of the society's frontier village; however, the frontier village was evicted from its site in 2009, and the depot was placed into storage. It has since been relocated to Heritage Village on 2nd Street, including other relocated historic buildings from other parts of Will County. The Blackhawk Railway Historical Society was involved in restoring this depot to its original appearance. During the early 1940s, the government bought land in Jackson and Florence townships in order to build the Joliet Arsenal. As a result, farmers were forced to leave Jackson and Florence Townships, and many moved their homes down the street, to Symerton.

== Geography ==
Symerton is located at 41°19′41″N 88°3′16″W (41.328133, -88.054550).

According to the 2010 census, Symerton has a total area of 0.05 square miles (0.13 km^{2}), all land. It is the smallest village in Will County by size and by population. It is located between Peotone and Wilmington.

== Demographics ==
Historical population
Census	Pop.	Note	%±
1910	157		—
1920	69		−56.1%
1930	77		11.6%
1940	82		6.5%
1950	119		45.1%
1960	123		3.4%
1970	155		26.0%
1980	120		−22.6%
1990	110		−8.3%
2000	106		−3.6%
2010	87		−17.9%
2020	128		47.1%
U.S. Decennial Census

=== 2020 census ===
Symerton village, Illinois – Racial and ethnic composition Note: the US Census treats Hispanic/Latino as an ethnic category. This table excludes Latinos from the racial categories and assigns them to a separate category. Hispanics/Latinos may be of any race.
Race / Ethnicity (NH = Non-Hispanic)	Pop 2000	Pop 2010	Pop 2020	% 2000	% 2010	% 2020
White alone (NH)	105	86	121	99.06%	98.85%	94.53%
Black or African American alone (NH)	1	0	0	0.94%	0.00%	0.00%
Native American or Alaska Native alone (NH)	0	0	1	0.00%	0.00%	0.78%
Asian alone (NH)	0	0	0	0.00%	0.00%	0.00%
Native Hawaiian or Pacific Islander alone (NH)	0	0	0	0.00%	0.00%	0.00%
Other race alone (NH)	0	0	1	0.00%	0.00%	0.78%
Mixed race or Multiracial (NH)	0	0	2	0.00%	0.00%	1.56%
Hispanic or Latino (any race)	0	1	3	0.00%	1.15%	2.34%
Total	106	87	128	100.00%	100.00%	100.00%

=== 2000 census ===
As of the census of 2000, there were 106 people, 34 households, and 24 families residing in the village. The population density was 2,064.1 inhabitants per square mile (797.0/km^{2}). There were 36 housing units at an average density of 701.0 per square mile (270.7/km^{2}). The racial makeup of the village was 99.06% White and 0.94% African American.

There were 34 households, out of which 38.2% had children under the age of 18 living with them, 64.7% were married couples living together, 2.9% had a female householder with no husband present, and 26.5% were non-families. 23.5% of all households were made up of individuals, and 5.9% had someone living alone who was 65 years of age or older. The average household size was 3.12 and the average family size was 3.76.

In the village, the population was spread out, with 30.2% under the age of 18, 11.3% from 18 to 24, 28.3% from 25 to 44, 24.5% from 45 to 64, and 5.7% who were 65 years of age or older. The median age was 30 years. For every 100 females, there were 100.0 males. For every 100 females age 18 and over, there were 94.7 males.

As of 2019, the median income for a household in the village was $72,917. 1.0% of households were below the poverty line .

== Education ==
It is in the Wilmington Community Unit School District 209U.
