= Garden of Eden, Illinois =

Unincorporated community in illinois

- Unincorporated community
- Location within Illinois Location within the United States
- Coordinates: 41°10′11″N 87°33′42″W
- Country: United States
- State: Illinois
- County: Kankakee
- Township: Momence
- Elevation: 633 ft (193 m)
- Time zone: UTC-6 (Central (CST))
  - Summer (DST): UTC-5 (CDT)
- GNIS feature ID: 408874

Garden of Eden is an unincorporated community in Kankakee County, Illinois, United States.

The settlement is located on the Kankakee River.
