= Voltaire, North Dakota =

- City
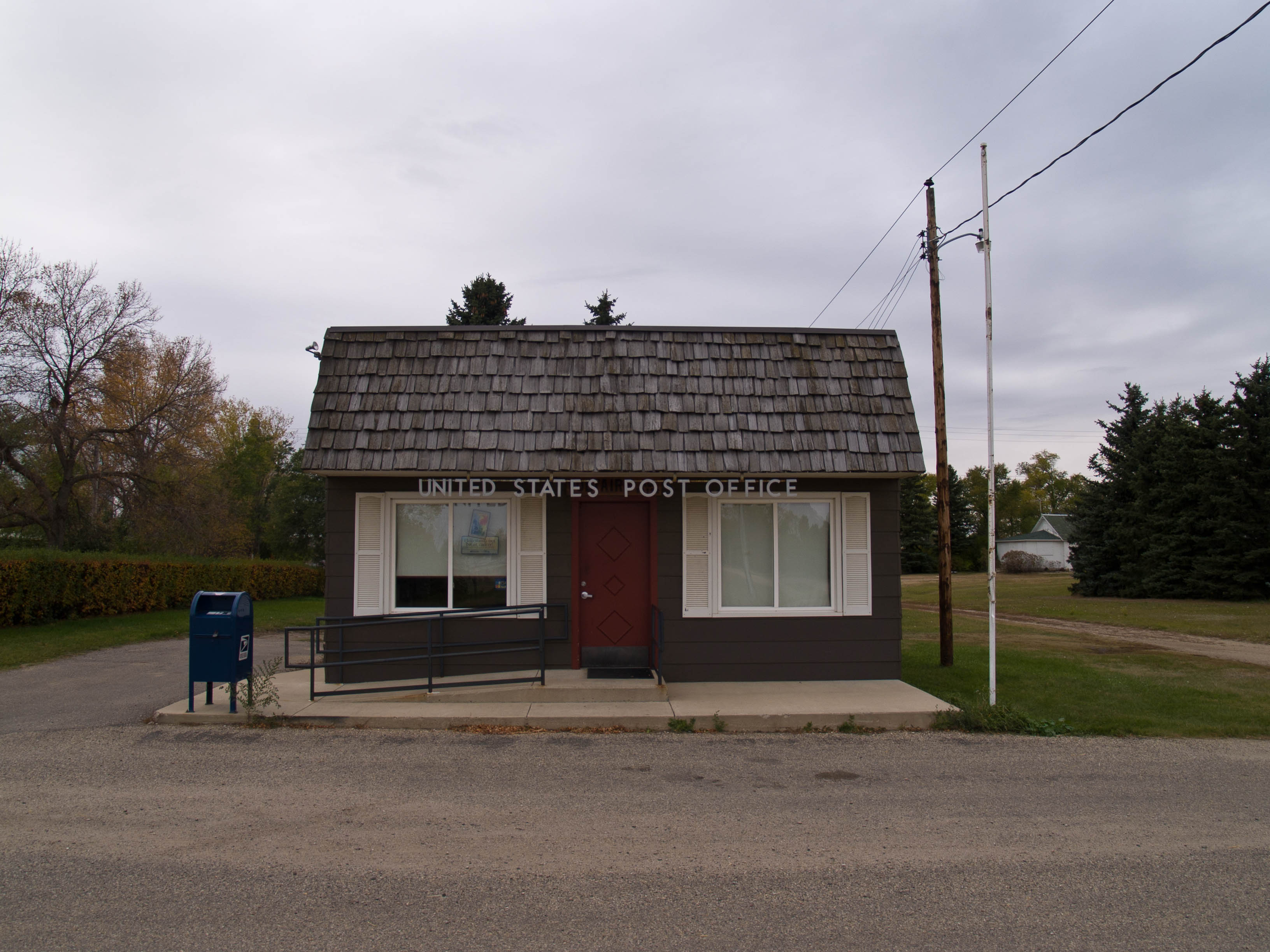
- US Post office in Voltaire

- Location of Voltaire, North Dakota
- Coordinates: 48°01′07″N 100°50′38″W
- Country: United States
- State: North Dakota
- County: McHenry
- Founded: 1901

Area
  - Total: 0.49 sq mi (1.26 km^{2})
  - Land: 0.49 sq mi (1.26 km^{2})
  - Water: 0 sq mi (0.00 km^{2})
- Elevation: 1,591 ft (485 m)

Population (2020)
  - Total: 46
  - Estimate (2022): 43
  - Density: 94.6/sq mi (36.52/km^{2})
- Time zone: UTC-6 (Central (CST))
  - Summer (DST): UTC-5 (CDT)
- ZIP code: 58792
- Area code: 701
- FIPS code: 38-82380
- GNIS feature ID: 1036310

Voltaire is a city in McHenry County, North Dakota, United States. The population was 46 at the 2020 census. It is part of the Minot Micropolitan Statistical Area.

== History ==
Voltaire was founded in 1901. The city was most likely named after a local pioneer. A post office has been in operation at Voltaire since 1901.

== Geography ==
According to the United States Census Bureau, the city has a total area of 0.40 square miles (1.04 km^{2}), all land.

== Demographics ==
Historical population
Census	Pop.	Note	%±
1930	61		—
1940	101		65.6%
1950	72		−28.7%
1960	70		−2.8%
1970	54		−22.9%
1980	65		20.4%
1990	63		−3.1%
2000	51		−19.0%
2010	40		−21.6%
2020	46		15.0%
2022 (est.)	43		−6.5%
U.S. Decennial Census; 2020 Census

=== 2010 census ===
As of the census of 2010, there were 40 people in 21 households, including 11 families, in the city. The population density was 100.0 inhabitants per square mile (38.6/km^{2}). There were 22 housing units at an average density of 55.0 per square mile (21.2/km^{2}). The racial makeup of the city was 95.0% White, 2.5% African American, and 2.5% from two or more races.

Of the 21 households 19.0% had children under the age of 18 living with them, 47.6% were married couples living together, 4.8% had a male householder with no wife present, and 47.6% were non-families. 42.9% of households were one person and 23.8% were one person aged 65 or older. The average household size was 1.90 and the average family size was 2.55.

The median age was 49.5 years. 15% of residents were under the age of 18; 2.5% were between the ages of 18 and 24; 22.5% were from 25 to 44; 40% were from 45 to 64; and 20% were 65 or older. The gender makeup of the city was 50.0% male and 50.0% female.

=== 2000 census ===
As of the census of 2000, there were 51 people in 20 households, including 14 families, in the city. The population density was 125.1 inhabitants per square mile (48.3/km^{2}). There were 21 housing units at an average density of 51.5 per square mile (19.9/km^{2}). The racial makeup of the city was 100.00% White.

Of the 20 households 35.0% had children under the age of 18 living with them, 55.0% were married couples living together, 15.0% had a female householder with no husband present, and 30.0% were non-families. 30.0% of households were one person and 15.0% were one person aged 65 or older. The average household size was 2.55 and the average family size was 3.14.

The age distribution was 31.4% under the age of 18, 2.0% from 18 to 24, 21.6% from 25 to 44, 29.4% from 45 to 64, and 15.7% 65 or older. The median age was 42 years. For every 100 females, there were 96.2 males. For every 100 females age 18 and over, there were 94.4 males.

The median household income was $37,500 and the median family income was $37,500. Males had a median income of $38,750 versus $19,375 for females. The per capita income for the city was $14,854. There were 16.7% of families and 13.0% of the population living below the poverty line, including 26.7% of under eighteens and none of those over 64.
