= St. James, North Carolina =

- Town
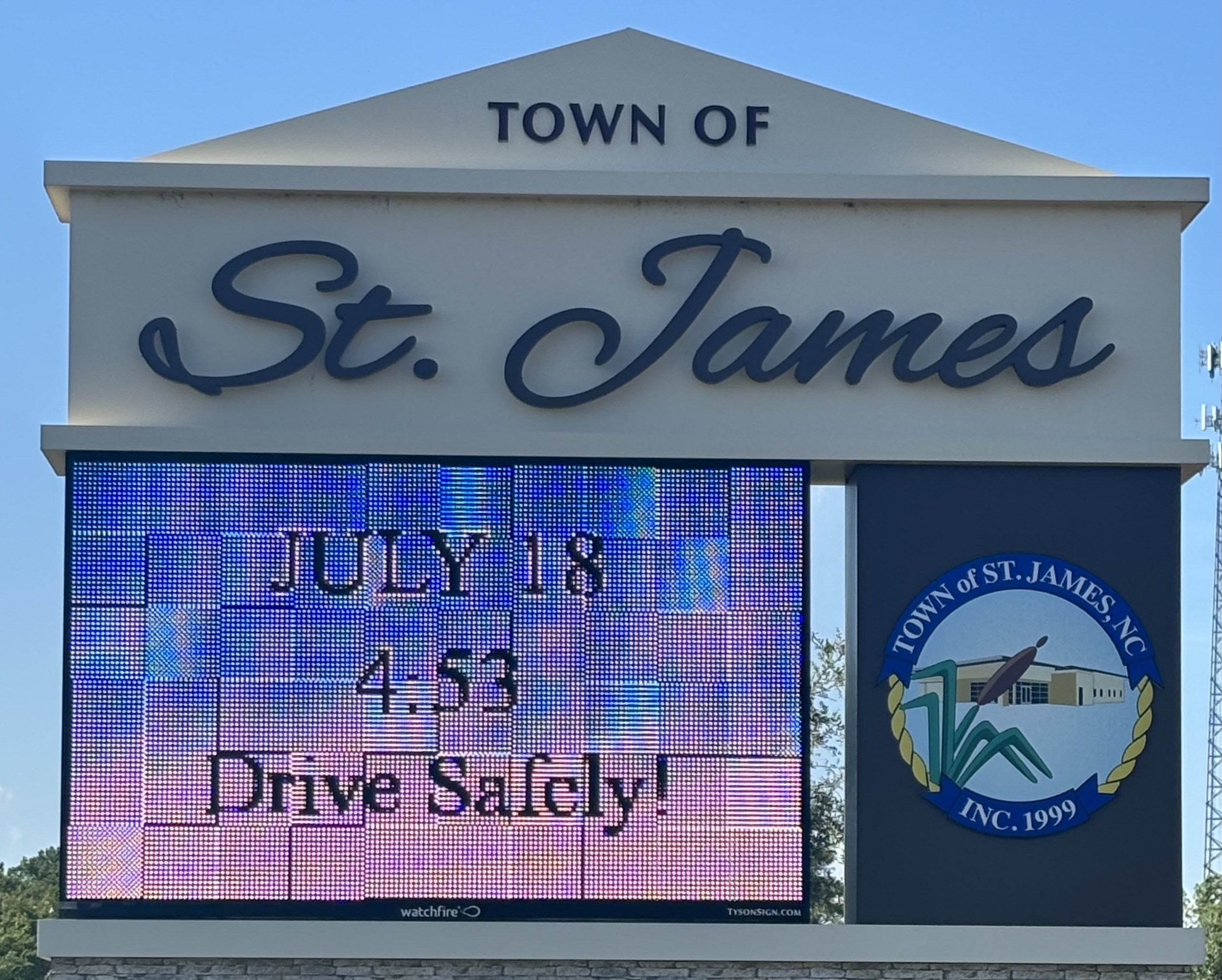
- Town of St. James Sign

- Seal

- Location within the state of North Carolina
- Coordinates: 33°56′48″N 78°06′47″W
- Country: United States
- State: North Carolina
- County: Brunswick

Area
  - Total: 9.20 sq mi (23.83 km^{2})
  - Land: 9.11 sq mi (23.60 km^{2})
  - Water: 0.085 sq mi (0.22 km^{2})
- Elevation: 56 ft (17 m)

Population (2020)
  - Total: 6,529
  - Density: 716/sq mi (276.6/km^{2})
- Time zone: UTC-5 (Eastern (EST))
  - Summer (DST): UTC-4 (EDT)
- FIPS code: 37-58630
- GNIS feature ID: 2407392
- Website: www.townofstjamesnc.org

St. James or Saint James is a town in Brunswick County, North Carolina, United States. As of the 2020 census, St. James had a population of 6,529. It is part of the Wilmington, NC Metropolitan Statistical Area.

== Geography ==
St. James is located in southern Brunswick County, it is bordered to the south, west, and north by the town of Oak Island. North Carolina Highway 211 forms part of the northern border of the town, leading east 5 miles (8 km) to Southport and west 11 miles (18 km) to U.S. Route 17 at Supply.

According to the United States Census Bureau, the town of St. James has a total area of 8.3 square miles (21.5 km^{2}), of which 8.3 square miles (21.4 km^{2}) is land and 0.04 square miles (0.1 km^{2}), or 0.46%, is water.

== Demographics ==
Historical population
Census	Pop.	Note	%±
2000	804		—
2010	3,165		293.7%
2020	6,529		106.3%
2025 (est.)	7,318	▲	12.1%
U.S. Decennial Census

=== 2020 census ===
As of the 2020 census, St. James had a population of 6,529. The median age was 69.3 years. 1.4% of residents were under the age of 18 and 70.0% were 65 years of age or older. For every 100 females there were 95.4 males, and for every 100 females age 18 and over there were 95.3 males.

99.9% of residents lived in urban areas, while 0.1% lived in rural areas.

There were 3,368 households in St. James, of which 2.1% had children under the age of 18 living in them. Of all households, 80.8% were married-couple households, 6.2% were households with a male householder and no spouse or partner present, and 10.9% were households with a female householder and no spouse or partner present. About 15.5% of all households were made up of individuals and 11.4% had someone living alone who was 65 years of age or older. There were 4,163 housing units, of which 19.1% were vacant. The homeowner vacancy rate was 1.8% and the rental vacancy rate was 48.0%.

St. James racial composition
Race	Number	Percentage
White (non-Hispanic)	6,258	95.85%
Black or African American (non-Hispanic)	27	0.41%
Native American	5	0.08%
Asian	51	0.78%
Pacific Islander	1	0.02%
Other/Mixed	111	1.7%
Hispanic or Latino	76	1.16%

=== 2010 census ===
As of the census of 2010, there were 3,165 people, 1,575 households, and 1,386 families residing in the town. The population density was 383 inhabitants per square mile (148/km^{2}). There were 2,263 housing units at an average density of 272.7 per square mile (105.3/km^{2}). The racial makeup of the town was 97.8% White, 1.0% African American, 0.1% American Indian, 0.6% Asian, 0.2% some other race, and 0.3% from two or more races. Hispanic or Latino of any race were 0.9% of the population.

There were 1,575 households, out of which 3.0% had children under the age of 18 living with them, 86.3% were headed by married couples living together, 1.3% had a female householder with no husband present, and 12.0% were non-families. 10.4% of all households were made up of individuals, and 6.0% were someone living alone who was 65 years of age or older. The average household size was 2.01 and the average family size was 2.12.

In the town, the population was spread out, with 2.5% under the age of 18, 0.9% from 18 to 24, 3.7% from 25 to 44, 43.4% from 45 to 64, and 49.8% who were 65 years of age or older. The median age was 65.0 years. For every 100 females, there were 96.7 males. For every 100 females age 18 and over, there were 96.7 males.

=== Income and poverty ===
For the period 2008–2012, the estimated median annual income for a household in the town was $82,476, and the median income for a family was $83,750. Male full-time workers had a median income of $46,094 versus $50,833 for females. The per capita income for the town was $67,796. 1.2% of the population and 0.9% of families were below the poverty line.

== Government ==
Saint James's council–manager form of government has 5 elected councilors. Councilors are elected for four-year staggered terms. The mayor and mayor pro tem are appointed by the town council. The town's attorney and manager serve at the pleasure of the council. All the other staff report to the town manager and manage the town's day-to-day business.

The town is led by Mayor Jean Toner, elected in 2023. The other council members are: Jim Board (2025), Lynn Dutney (2023), Bill Lewis (2025), and Dennis Barclay (2025).

In the North Carolina House of Representatives, St. James is represented by Charlie Miller (District 19). In the North Carolina Senate, St. James is represented by Bill Rabon (District 8). In the United States House of Representatives St. James is represented by David Rouzer (NC-7).
