= National Register of Historic Places listings in Jasper County, Indiana =

Location of Jasper County in Indiana

This is a list of the National Register of Historic Places listings in Jasper County, Indiana.

This is intended to be a complete list of the properties and districts on the National Register of Historic Places in Jasper County, Indiana, United States. Latitude and longitude coordinates are provided for many National Register properties and districts; these locations may be seen together in a map.

There are 12 properties and districts listed on the National Register in the county.

Properties and districts located in incorporated areas display the name of the municipality, while properties and districts in unincorporated areas display the name of their civil township. Properties and districts split between multiple jurisdictions display the names of all jurisdictions.

This National Park Service list is complete through NPS recent listings posted August 29, 2025.

== Current listings ==
	Name on the Register	Image	Date listed	Location	City or town	Description
1	Fountain Park Chautauqua	Fountain Park Chautauqua	December 7, 2001 (#01001351)	6244 W. County Road 1600 S, north of Remington; 40°46′45″N 87°09′42″W	Carpenter Township	
2	Charles Halleck Student Center	Charles Halleck Student Center	June 7, 2016 (#16000331)	Father Gross Rd. (campus of Saint Joseph's College); 40°55′19″N 87°09′34″W	Marion Township	
3	Independence Methodist Church	Independence Methodist Church	March 5, 1982 (#82000042)	Southeast of Wheatfield; 41°04′01″N 86°56′58″W	Gillam Township	
4	Jasper County Courthouse	Jasper County Courthouse	June 16, 1983 (#83000126)	W. Washington St. 40°56′09″N 87°09′03″W	Rensselaer	
5	David & Sarah Nowels House		February 22, 2023 (#100008660)	500 North McKinley; 40°56′27″N 87°09′04″W	Rensselaer	
6	Oren F. and Adelia Parker House	Oren F. and Adelia Parker House	September 30, 2014 (#14000804)	102 S. Park Ave. 40°56′04″N 87°09′17″W	Rensselaer	
7	Hugh and Leona Rank House	Hugh and Leona Rank House	June 7, 2016 (#16000332)	975 Winding Rd. 40°54′47″N 87°09′35″W	Marion Township	
8	Remington Water Tower and Town Hall	Remington Water Tower and Town Hall	December 23, 2003 (#03001314)	3 E. Michigan St. 40°45′43″N 87°09′03″W	Remington	
9	Rensselaer Carnegie Library	Rensselaer Carnegie Library	March 17, 1994 (#94000233)	301 N. Van Rensselaer St. 40°56′16″N 87°09′12″W	Rensselaer	
10	Rensselaer Courthouse Square Historic District	Rensselaer Courthouse Square Historic District	April 10, 2012 (#12000185)	Roughly between Cullen and Front Sts. along W. Washington St. 40°56′10″N 87°09′07″W	Rensselaer	
11	St. Joseph Indian Normal School	St. Joseph Indian Normal School	June 19, 1973 (#73000018)	St. Joseph's College Campus off U.S. Route 231; 40°55′17″N 87°09′04″W	Rensselaer	
12	Schwietermann Hall	Schwietermann Hall	June 7, 2016 (#16000333)	Schuster Rd. (campus of St. Joseph's College); 40°55′09″N 87°09′24″W	Marion Township	

== See also ==
- List of National Historic Landmarks in Indiana
- National Register of Historic Places listings in Indiana
- Listings in neighboring counties: Benton, Lake, LaPorte, Newton, Porter, Pulaski, Starke, White
- List of Indiana state historical markers in Jasper County
