= List of Indiana state historical markers in Jasper County =

Location of Jasper County in Indiana

This is a list of the Indiana state historical markers in Jasper County.

This is intended to be a complete list of the official state historical markers placed in Jasper County, Indiana, United States by the Indiana Historical Bureau. The locations of the historical markers and their latitude and longitude coordinates are included below when available, along with their names, years of placement, and topics as recorded by the Historical Bureau. There are 6 historical markers located in Jasper County.

== Historical markers ==
Marker title	Image	Year placed	Location	Topics
General Robert H. Milroy 1816-1890		1964	Milroy Park, 3 blocks west of downtown surrounded by Washington and Milroy Streets and College Avenue in Rensselaer; 40°56′4″N 87°9′18.6″W	Military
La Salle Expedition		1966	U.S. Route 231 at the Kankakee River in northern Jasper County; 41°15′33″N 87°11′56″W	Early Settlement and Exploration
St. Joseph's Indian Normal School 1888-1896		1971	Eastern side of U.S. Route 231, across from the main entrance to Saint Joseph's College on the southern side of Rensselaer; 40°55′16.6″N 87°9′18″W	Education, American Indian/Native American, Religion
Fountain Park Chautauqua		1992	Central grounds of Fountain Park Chautauqua, located along County Road 1600S approximately 0.3 miles west of U.S. Route 231 in Remington; 40°46′44″N 87°9′30″W	Special Events
Remington Water Tower		2006	3 E. Michigan Street in Remington; 40°45′43″N 87°9′2″W	Buildings and Architecture, Government Institutions
James Frederick Hanley		2008	Southeastern corner of the junction of Front and Washington Streets in Rensselaer; 40°56′7″N 87°9′11″W	Arts and Culture

== See also ==
- List of Indiana state historical markers
- National Register of Historic Places listings in Jasper County, Indiana
