= WPUM =

Rensselaer, Indiana; United States
- Broadcast area: Jasper County, Indiana
- Frequency: 93.3 MHz FM

Programming
- Format: Defunct (formerly Contemporary hit radio)
- Affiliations: Saint Joseph's College

Ownership
- Owner: Saint Joseph's College

History
- First air date: 1977
- Call sign meaning: Pumas - College Mascot

Technical information
- Licensing authority: FCC
- Power: 60 watts
- Transmitter coordinates: 40°55′12.00″N 87°09′27.00″W

Links
- Public license information: Public file; LMS

WPUM (93.3 FM) was a non-commercial educational radio station begun in 1977 in Rensselaer, Indiana, United States, owned by Saint Joseph's College. The format was primarily contemporary hit radio and Oldies hosted by Saint Joseph's College students in hour air shifts. The station also broadcast the school's sports programs and could be listened to live on the Internet at WPUM's website. The station was licensed by the Federal Communications Commission (FCC). Its coverage area included Rensselaer and Jasper County, Indiana.

== Switch to 93.3 The Joe ==
Through the 2000s, WPUM had been known as 90.5 Puma Rock, but a displacement of radio frequency by another station in nearby Crown Point, Indiana, resulted in a loss of their place on the radio dial. After a long appeal to the FCC, WPUM was transferred temporarily to 93.3 FM until another frequency became available in the non-commercial range on the FM dial. WPUM has been at 93.3 since the fall of 2008. When WPUM changed frequency, it also formally changed its format to include more of a variety rather than straight rock that the station had featured since its launch in 1977. As a result, 90.5 Puma Rock became 93.3 The Joe.

== WPUM going off the air ==
WPUM radio broadcast its last radio program on April 27, 2017, ending at 7 pm CST. Associate Professor of Communication and Director of Radio Sally Berger and Associate Professor of Communication/Director of Television Fred Berger made the final broadcast and station sign off at the end of a segment that brought WPUM DJ alumni into the studio for a retrospective program covering the nearly 40-year history of the station. Michael Moyer, WPUM's first on-air DJ, joined Mr. and Mrs. Berger to spin the final song, Al Stewart's 1976 "Year of the Cat," which was also the first song ever played on the station to complete a bookend and close the station's existence.

The FCC cancelled the station's license on March 12, 2019, due to the station having been silent since signing off.
