= Baileys Corner =

Baileys Corner may refer to:

- Baileys Corner, Indiana
- Baileys Corner, New Jersey
