= Jasper County Courthouse (Indiana) =

- U.S. National Register of Historic Places
- U.S. Historic district – Contributing property
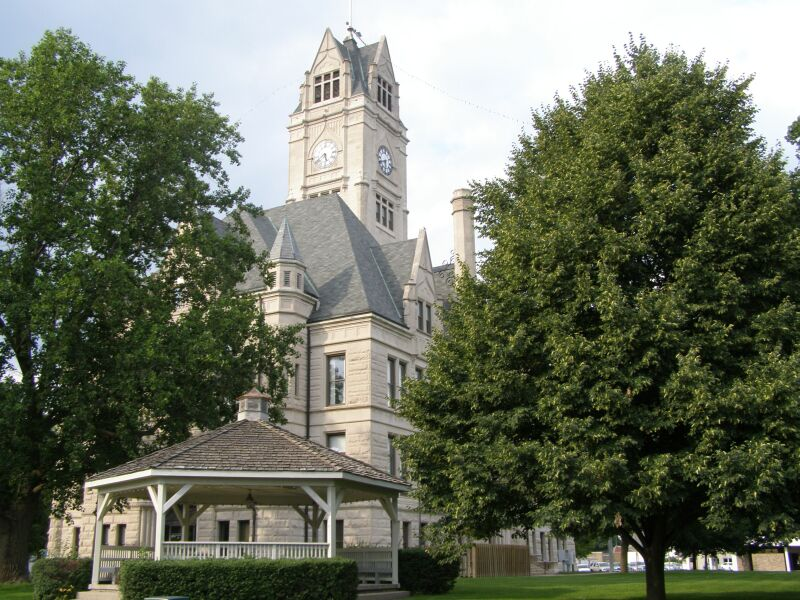
- View from the south

- Location within Indiana Location within the United States
- Location: W. Washington St., Rensselaer, Indiana
- Coordinates: 40°56′9″N 87°9′3″W
- Area: 2.3 acres (0.93 ha)
- Built: 1898
- Architect: Grindle & Weatherhogg; Heinzmen Brothers
- NRHP reference No.: 83000126
- Added to NRHP: June 16, 1983

The Jasper County Courthouse in Rensselaer, Indiana is a building from 1898. It was listed on the National Register of Historic Places in 1983 and is located in the Rensselaer Courthouse Square Historic District. The Jasper County Courthouse was erected in 1898 at a total cost of $141,731.94. It is located in the center of the Courthouse Square bounded by Washington, Cull en, Harrison and Van Rensselaer Streets. The Courthouse Square, itself, is defined by a retaining wall of concrete, about 18" high and a foot wide. There are steps leading from the street to the walks leading to all four entrances to the building.

The building stands on a bedrock. The building has four floors for a total of 348,404 square feet (32,367.8 m^{2}), plus a basement and the tower. The clock tower is 120 feet (37 m) high.

The building is faced Bedford limestone, and features medieval elements. Entrances on the north and south sides are framed in two-story Tudor arches supported on clusters of columns. Flanking these entrances are three-story round towers. Centered over the entrance is a wall dormer, which is surmounted by the clock tower. The clock tower also has a wall dormer on each face of its pyramidal roof.

On either side of the entrances and towers are five double-hung windows on each floor, with wall dormers over two bays. The corners have narrow, windowless turrets. The entrance bay, dormer, and flanking towers project from the building.

The stone masonry support walls have arches between rooms. Each of the first three floors above the basement have terrazzo floors, marble wainscoting and oak woodwork, and the stairs have marble treads. The plaster columns in the stairwell have been decorated to look like marble. The stair rails are of hand-hammered iron with marble rails.

In 1982 an elevator was installed to serve the first three floors. The second floor features include four brass chandeliers with lead blown shades and two newel post lamps to match. The recently decorated walls are highlighted with gold paint and some gold leaf decoration. The entrance to the Auditor's Office has stained glass windows on either side and above the door.

The third floor is used entirely by the two courts. A brass chandelier with lead blown glass shades is in the foyer between the courtrooms. The courtrooms are almost identical with the original oak judicial benches with their hand carved seals of the State of Indiana on the back panel of each bench. The walls are decorated with plaster leaf swag. There are plaster columns on either side connected by plaster arches. There is decorative plasterwork around the windows. The stained glass panels, which surround the courtroom entrances, are set in carved wooden frames.

The clock tower, itself, has three floors; the first has windows, the second contains the clock, and the third the bell.

== Significance ==
Heinzmen Brothers, Noblesville, Builders The Jasper County Courthouse is an example of Victorian adaptation of the medieval forms of architecture. Several features show this, such as the free standing chimneys, the high pitched roof, the gabled dormers, the turrets, and the painted plaster columns in the hallways.

The first architect employed for this building was Alfred Grind!e, who later associated himself with Charles R. Weatherhogg, of Fort Wayne, Indiana. Before the building was completed, Mr. Grindle dropped out and Mr. Weatherhogg completed the architectural part of the work.

== Gallery ==
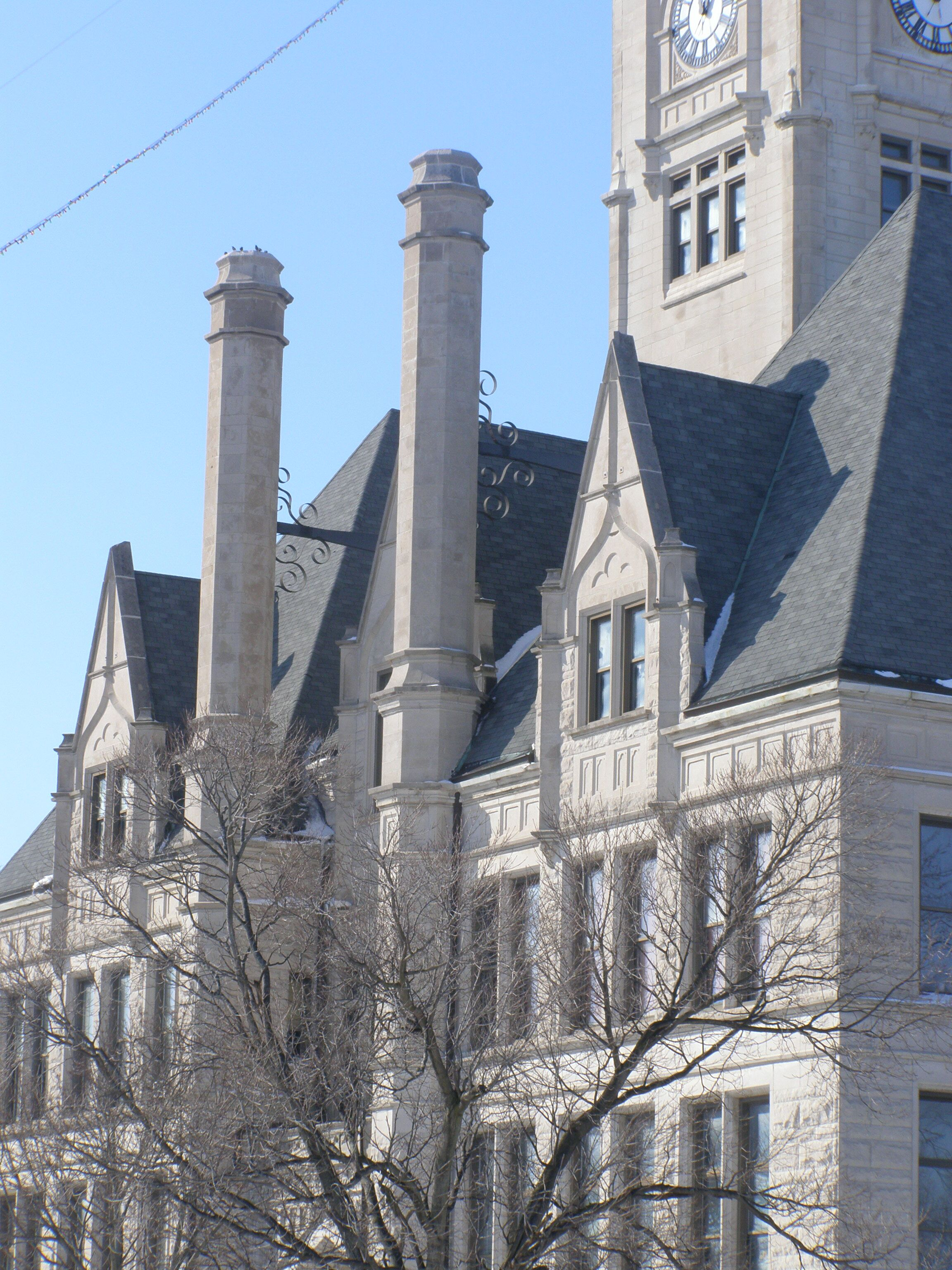
Free Standing Chimneys of the Jasper County, Indiana Courthouse

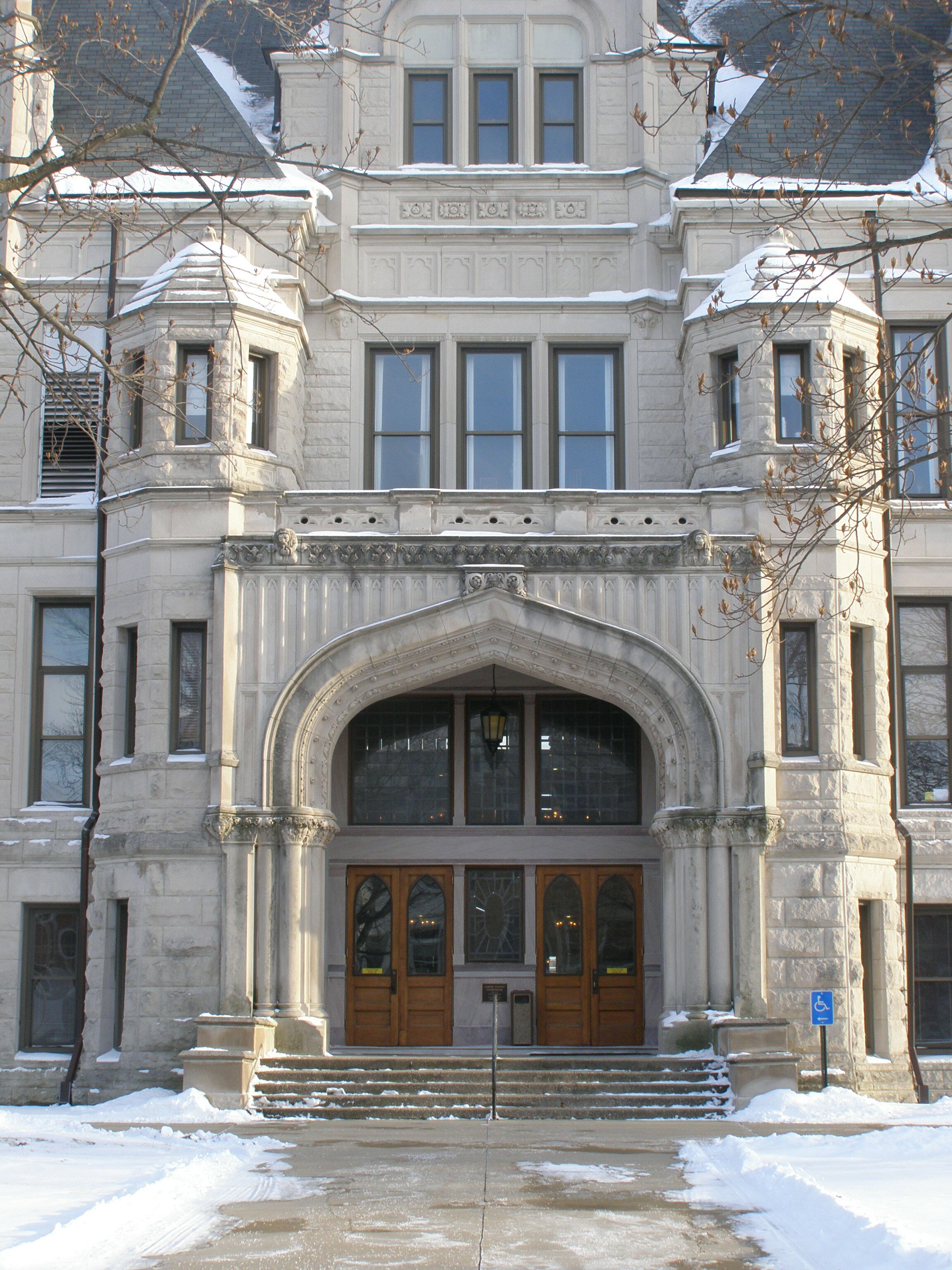
Main Entrance of the Jasper County, Indiana Courthouse

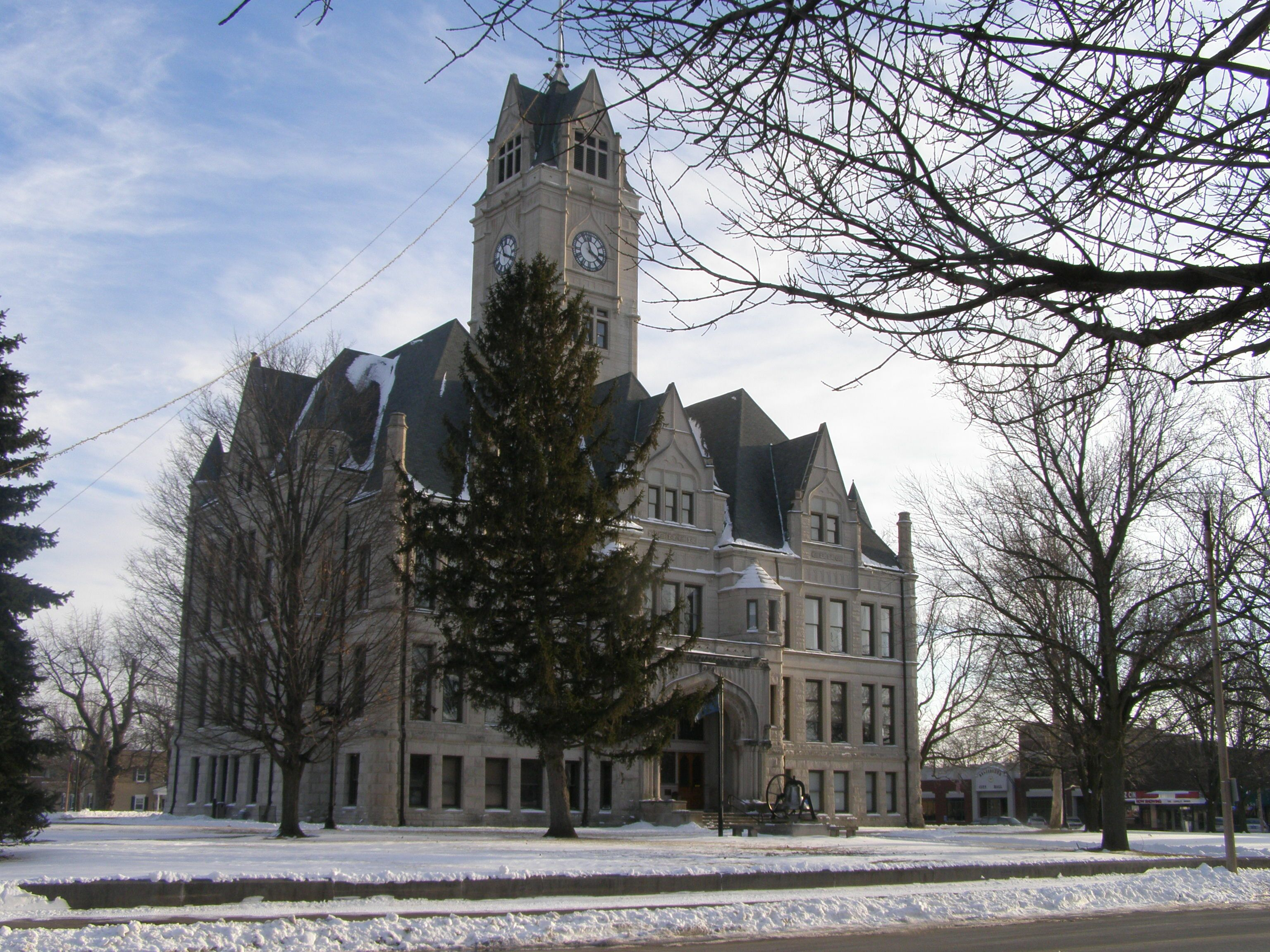
Jasper County, Indiana Courthouse

== See also ==
- Rensselaer Carnegie Library
- Remington Water Tower and Town Hall
