= Independence Methodist Church =

Historic church in Indiana, United States

- U.S. National Register of Historic Places
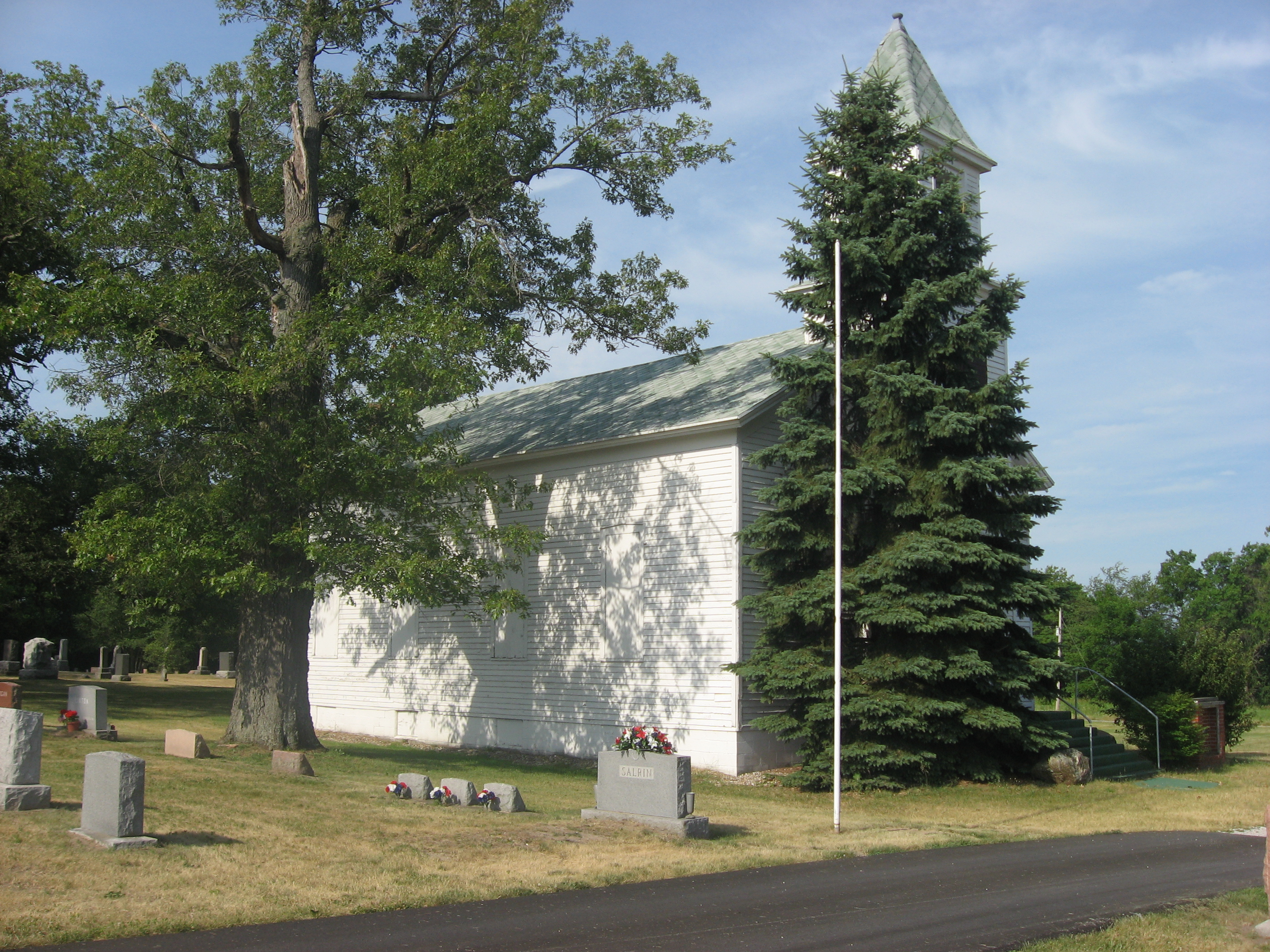
- Independence Methodist Church, June 2012

- Location within Indiana Location within the United States
- Location: Southeast of Wheatfield in Gillam Township, Jasper County, Indiana
- Coordinates: 41°4′1″N 86°56′58″W
- Area: 1 acre (0.40 ha)
- Built: 1872
- Architectural style: Gothic, Greek Revival, Italianate
- NRHP reference No.: 82000042
- Added to NRHP: March 5, 1982

Independence Methodist Church is a historic Methodist church located at the junction of N500E and E375N southeast of Wheatfield in Gillam Township, Jasper County, Indiana. It was built in 1872, and is a one-story, simple rectangular frame building originally built in the Greek Revival style. It was later modified with Gothic Revival style lancet windows and Italianate style trim on the central belfry.

It was added to the National Register of Historic Places on March 5, 1982.

== See also ==
- National Register of Historic Places listings in Jasper County, Indiana
