= Rensselaer Carnegie Library =

- U.S. National Register of Historic Places
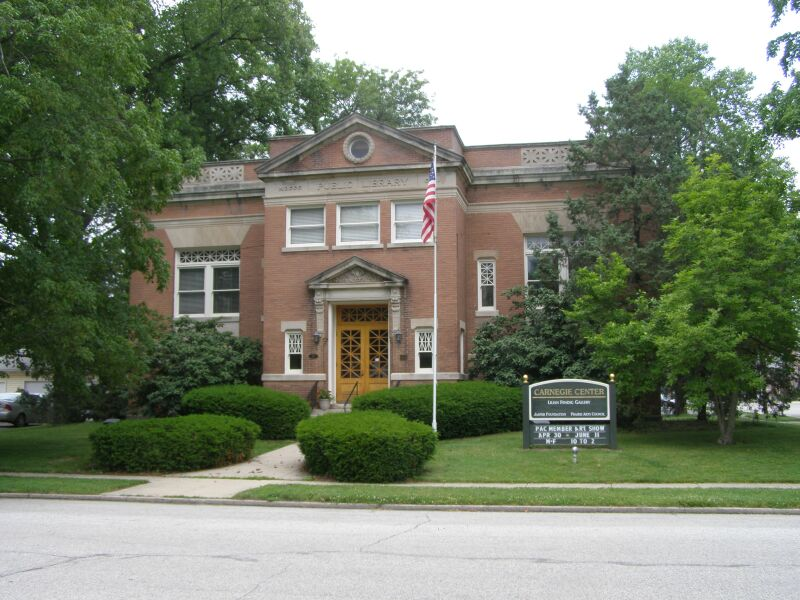

- Location within Indiana Location within the United States
- Location: 301 N. Van Rensselaer St., Rensselaer, Indiana
- Coordinates: 40°56′16″N 87°9′12″W
- Area: less than one acre
- Built: 1905
- Architect: Weatherhogg, Charles; Rush and Warren
- Architectural style: Late Gothic Revival
- NRHP reference No.: 94000233
- Added to NRHP: March 17, 1994

The Rensselaer Carnegie Library in Rensselaer, Indiana is a building from 1905. It was listed on the National Register of Historic Places in 1994. The building no longer functions as a library; since 1992 it houses the Prairie Arts Council, a local performing arts organization.

Built in 1904–1905, the library is a one-story masonry building on a raised basement. The basement is about 5 feet (1.5 m) above grade and 5 feet (1.5 m) below. The height of the main story creates the impression of a two or three story structure. The building is roughly square with a projecting entry bay centered in the main facade. The cubical massing is emphasized by the monopitch roof, which slopes to the rear (northeast). The roof is masked by a balustrade.

All exterior elevations are of "Hobart" buff face brick laid in common bond with dressed limestone detailing. The central entry bay is flanked by large windows on either side. A flight of stairs leads to main entry. Entry level is halfway between the primary floor level and grade level. The entry is defined by a broken pediment supported by fluted console scroll brackets, all of limestone. Flanking the entry is a stone water table on which rest small, narrow windows. A frieze has raised Roman lettering stating "MDCCC PUBLIC LIBRARY 01111". Above this is a full pediment with stone raking cornices. An oculus with stone garland surround is centered in the brick tympanum.

The bays flanking the entry projection have paired double hung three over one sash with heavy stone lintels at the basement level. Above this runs a plain water table. Large paired one over one windows with stone tablets below each window mark the primary level. Above each window pair are continuous transoms having classical criss-cross fretwork muntins. Each paired window opening is surmounted by a limestone flat arch with radiating voussoirs. The entablature consists of a stone architrave, plain brick frieze, and limestone cornice. A brick parapet with stone coping masks the roofline. Set into the parapet and centered over the double windows below are stone panels repeating the fretwork of the transoms. The cornerstone of the building is located at the southwest corner. It reads "LAID July 13.A.L.5904 A.D.1904. BY GRAND MASTER OF INDIANA. WITH THE AID OF PRAIRIE LODGE No. 125 F.& A.M. C.R. WEATHERHOGG ARCHITECT."

The side elevations of the library both have three bays of fenestration detailed identically to the flanking bays of the main facade. The basement windows at the northeast corner of the side elevation have been infilled with brick. The rear elevation is similar to the side elevations, however, the rear roof line lacks the parapet and has a single chimney stack. The basement window located toward the northeast corner has been bricked off as well. Near the center of the basement level, a small wood frame vestibule has been added to shelter a basement level entry.

== Interior ==
A foyer with stairs is just inside the main door. This tall space leads down to the basement on the left, and up to the main level on the right. Oak woodwork in the foyer remains intact, including wainscoting, paneling, and a purely decorative stair rail. The stair rail has paneled newels and turned balusters. Door and window surrounds have beaded vertical boards and entablature headers. Only the window moldings have been maintained from the original. Most of the original built-in bookcases remain, as do window and door surrounds. Suspended fluorescent lighting and acoustical ceiling tiles have been added. The stained glass skylight was removed.

The Rensselaer Carnegie Library was designed by Fort Wayne architect Charles Weatherhogg. Its architectural features include classical detailing, limestone ornamentation, and a symmetrical front façade.

== Gallery ==
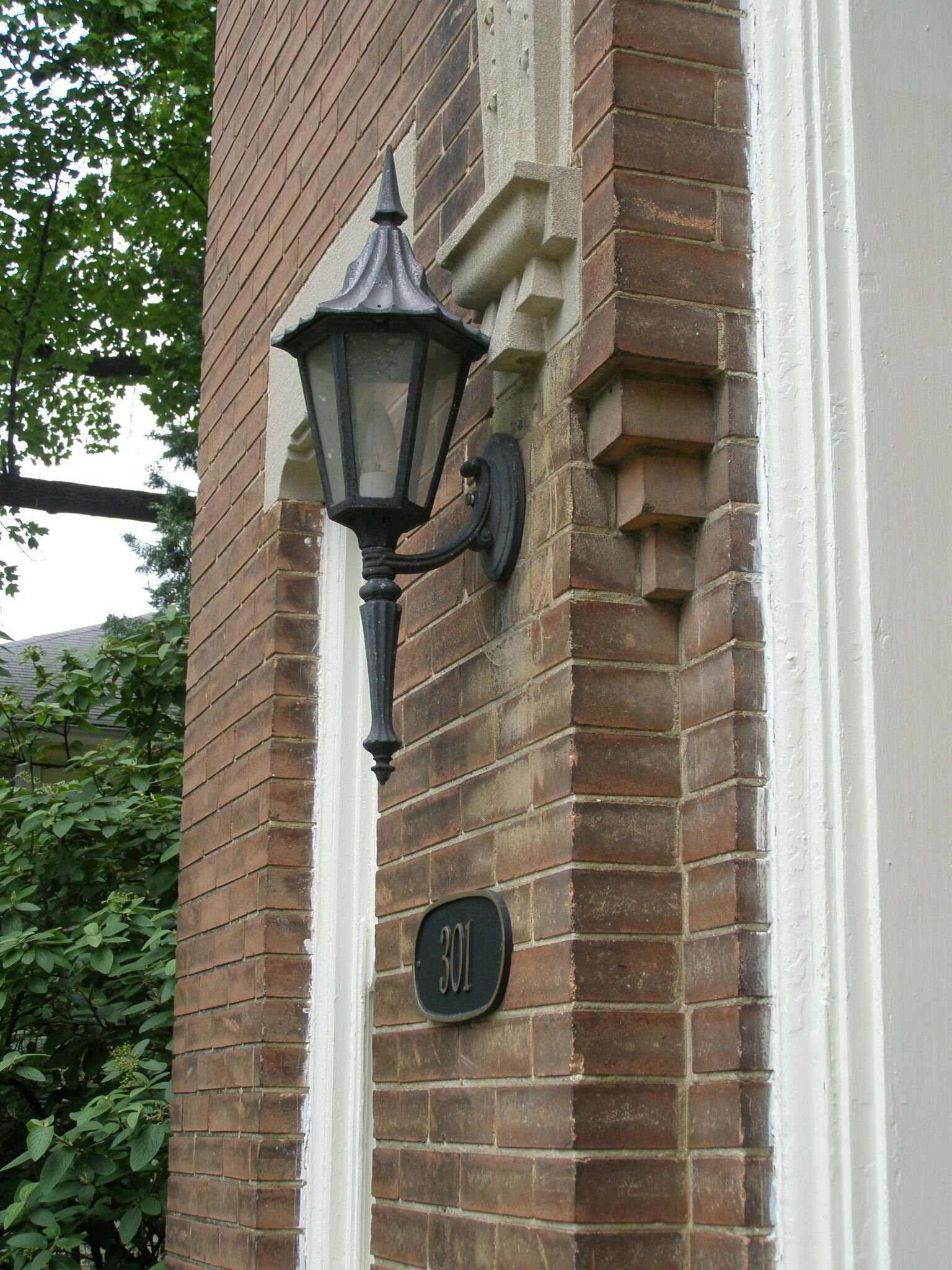
Closeup of exterior lamp

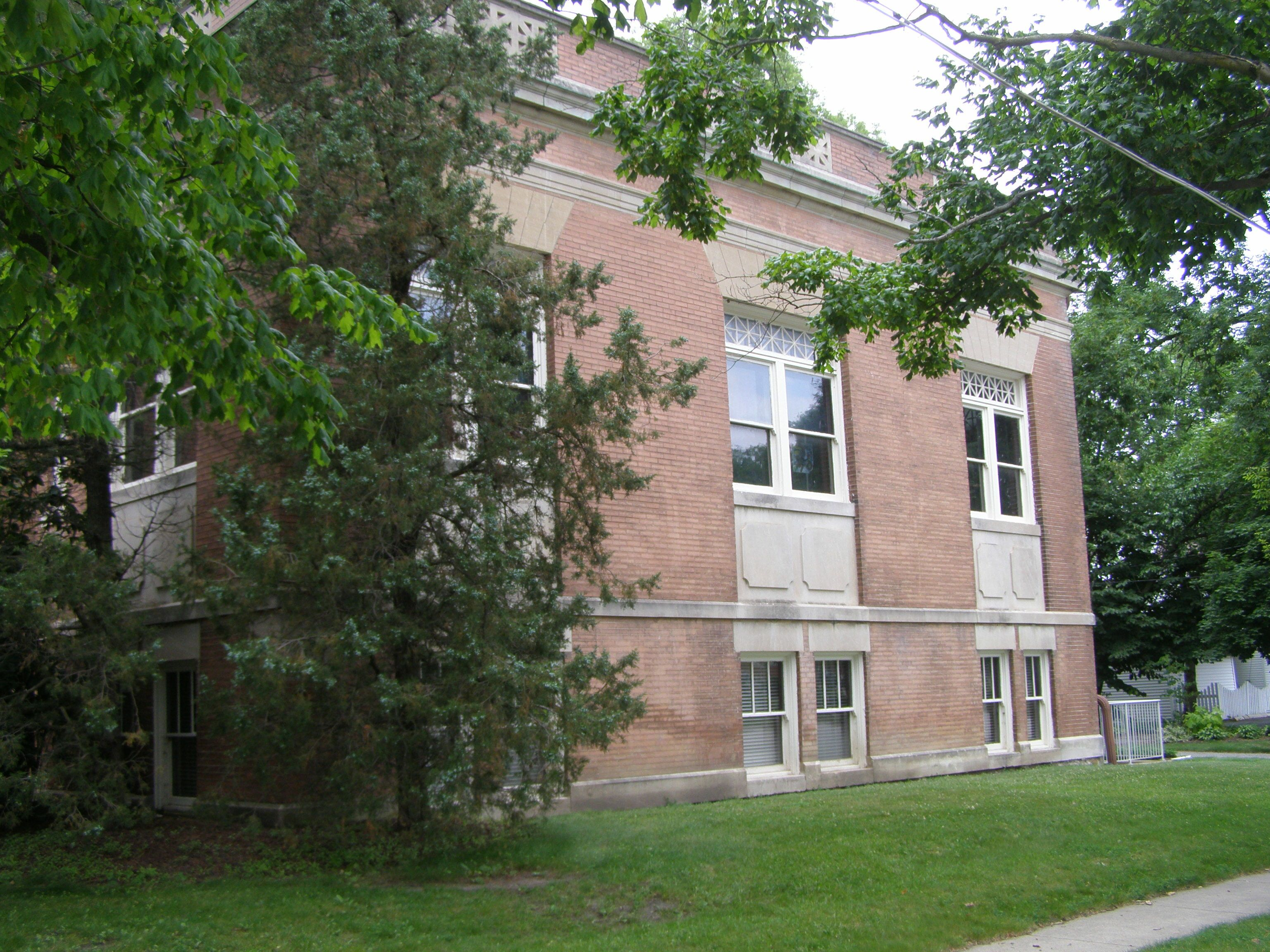
West facade of the Rensselaer Carnegie Library

== Bibliography ==
- Bobinski, George S. Carnegie Libraries. Chicago: American Library Association, 1969.
- History of Jasper County, Indiana. Jasper-Newton Counties, Genealogical Society, 1985.
- Hubbard, Kin, ed. A Book of Indiana. Indianapolis: Indiana
- Morrison, George. National Register of Historic Places Inventory-Nomination Form, Fairfield Manor, Alien County, Indiana. Listed 6–16–83.
- Wells, John. "Architecture of Carnegie Libraries in Indiana." Muncie, IN: Ball State University, 1981.

== See also ==
- List of Carnegie libraries in Indiana
- Jasper County Courthouse
