= Rensselaer Courthouse Square Historic District =

Historic district in Indiana, United States

- U.S. National Register of Historic Places
- U.S. Historic district
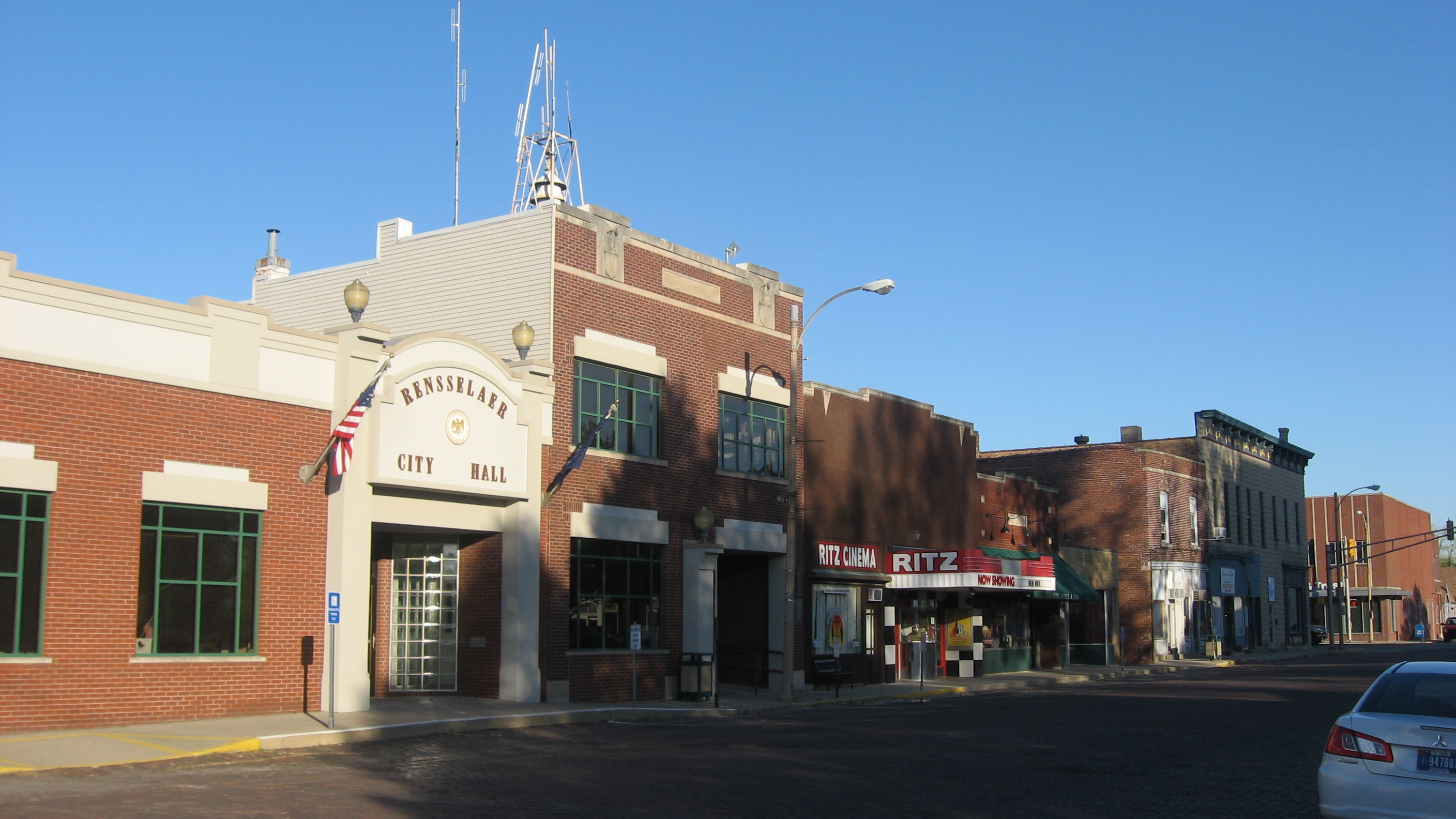
- Rensselaer Courthouse Square Historic District, April 2012

- Location within Indiana Location within the United States
- Location: Roughly between Cullen and Front Sts. along W. Washington St., Rensselaer, Indiana
- Coordinates: 40°56′10″N 87°09′07″W
- Area: 36.5 acres (14.8 ha)
- Built: 1868; 158 years ago
- Architect: Grindle & Weatherhogg, Simon Thompson, A. Wasson Coen
- Architectural style: Italianate, Romanesque, Classical Revival
- NRHP reference No.: 12000185
- Added to NRHP: April 10, 2012

Rensselaer Courthouse Square Historic District is a national historic district located at Rensselaer, Indiana. It encompasses 37 contributing buildings, two contributing structures, and three contributing objects in the central business district of Rensselaer. The district developed between about 1868 and 1955, and includes notable examples of Italianate, Romanesque Revival, Gothic Revival, Classical Revival, Art Deco, and Modern style architecture. Located in the district is the separately listed Jasper County Courthouse. Other notable buildings include the Mobil Service Station (1955), Murray Building (1906), A. Leopold Building (1881), First National Bank Building (1917), IOOF Lodge (1895), Eigelsbach Building (1899), Eger Grocery (c. 1930), and Worden Building (1928).

It was listed on the National Register of Historic Places in 2012.
