= Oren F. and Adelia Parker House =

Historic house in Indiana, United States

- U.S. National Register of Historic Places
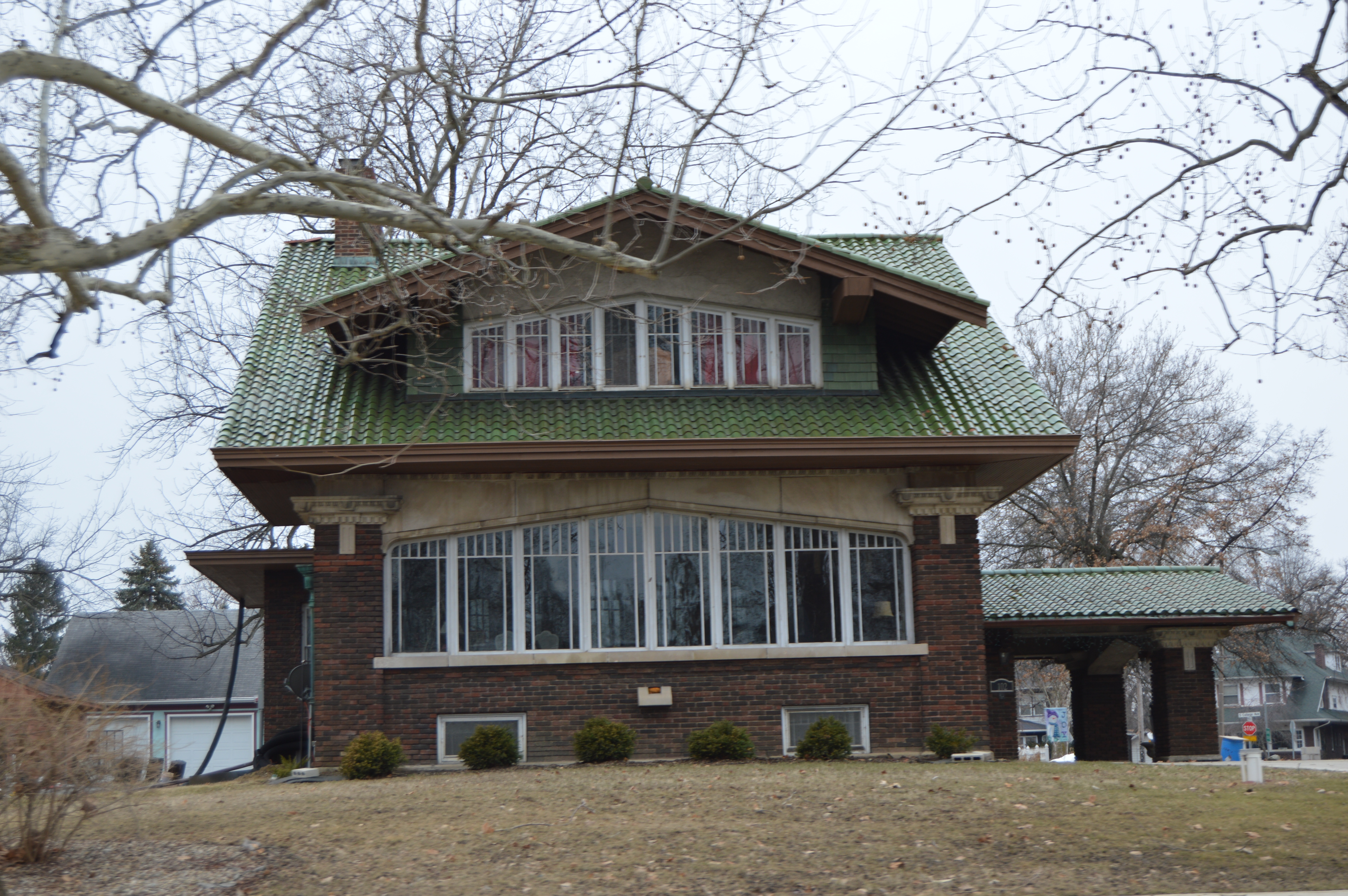
- Oren F. and Adelia Parker House, March 2015

- Location within Indiana Location within the United States
- Location: 102 S. Park Ave., Rensselaer, Indiana
- Coordinates: 40°56′04″N 87°09′17″W
- Area: Less than 1 acre (0.40 ha)
- Built: 1915-1917
- Built by: McColly, Fred
- Architect: Walter, F. Mead
- Architectural style: Bungalow / Craftsman, Tudor Revival
- NRHP reference No.: 14000804
- Added to NRHP: September 30, 2014

Oren F. and Adelia Parker House is a historic home located at Rensselaer, Indiana, United States. It was built between 1915 and 1917, and is a two-story, Bungalow / American Craftsman style brick dwelling with some Tudor Revival style design elements. The roof is sheathed in green tile and it features a large porte cochere and enclosed porch. The interior features original woodwork, fixtures, and murals.

It was listed on the National Register of Historic Places in 2014.
