= Marion Township, Jasper County, Indiana =

Marion Township
- Township
- Location in Jasper County
- Coordinates: 40°55′59″N 87°07′51″W
- Country: United States
- State: Indiana
- County: Jasper

Government
  - Type: Indiana township

Area
  - Total: 52.58 sq mi (136.2 km^{2})
  - Land: 52.51 sq mi (136.0 km^{2})
  - Water: 0.06 sq mi (0.16 km^{2}) 0.11%
- Elevation: 653 ft (199 m)

Population (2020)
  - Total: 6,648
  - Density: 144.2/sq mi (55.7/km^{2})
- GNIS feature ID: 0453607

Marion Township is one of thirteen townships in Jasper County, Indiana, United States. As of the 2020 census, its population was 6,648 (down from 7,571 at 2010) and it contained 2,522 housing units.

== History ==
Charles Halleck Student Center, Hugh and Leona Rank House, and Schwietermann Hall were listed on the National Register of Historic Places in 2016.

== Geography ==
According to the 2010 census, the township has a total area of 52.58 square miles (136.2 km^{2}), of which 52.51 square miles (136.0 km^{2}) (or 99.87%) is land and 0.06 square miles (0.16 km^{2}) (or 0.11%) is water.

=== Cities and towns ===
- Collegeville
- Rensselaer (the county seat)

=== Unincorporated towns ===
- North Marion
- South Marion

=== Adjacent townships ===
- Barkley Township (northeast)
- Hanging Grove Township (east)
- Milroy Township (southeast)
- Jordan Township (southwest)
- Newton Township (west)
- Union Township (northwest)

=== Cemeteries ===
The township contains three cemeteries: Crockett, Mount Calvary and Weston.

=== Major highways ===
- U.S. Route 231
- Indiana State Road 16
- Indiana State Road 114

=== Airports and landing strips ===
- Borntraeger Airstrip
- Jasper County Airport

== Education ==
Marion Township residents are eligible to obtain a free library card from the Jasper County Public Library.
