= Baileys Corner, Indiana =

- Unincorporated community
- Location within Indiana Location within the United States
- Coordinates: 41°04′15″N 86°59′54″W
- Country: United States
- State: Indiana
- County: Jasper
- Township: Gillam
- Elevation: 689 ft (210 m)
- ZIP code: 47978
- FIPS code: 18-03088
- GNIS feature ID: 430411

Baileys Corner is an unincorporated community in Gillam Township, Jasper County, Indiana.

== Geography ==
Baileys Corner is located at 41°04′15″N 86°59′54″W.
