= Charles Halleck Student Center =

- U.S. National Register of Historic Places
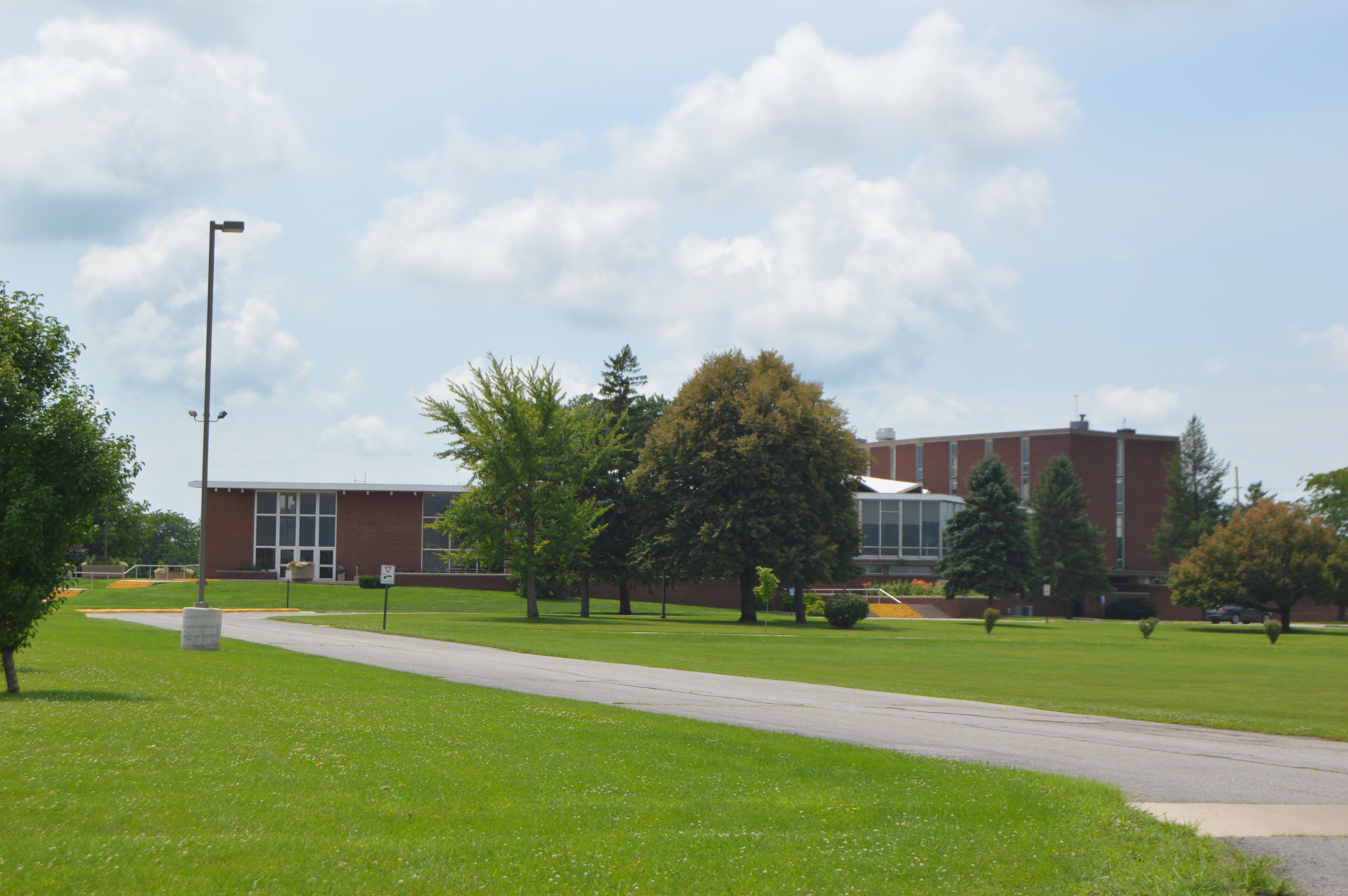
- Charles Halleck Student Center, July 2016

- Location within Indiana Location within the United States
- Location: Father Gross Rd. (campus of Saint Joseph's College), Marion Township, Jasper County, Indiana
- Coordinates: 40°55′19″N 87°09′34″W
- Area: Less than 1 acre (0.40 ha)
- Built: 1962
- Architect: Fischer, Frank
- Architectural style: International Style
- MPS: Modern Architecture of Rensselaer, Indiana
- NRHP reference No.: 16000331
- Added to NRHP: June 7, 2016

Charles Halleck Student Center is a historic institutional building located on the campus of Saint Joseph's College in Marion Township, Jasper County, Indiana. The International Style building was built in 1962, and is a multi-story, diamond-shaped building constructed around central dining halls. It features a wide overhanging roof and concrete trim, stepped terraces, open floating staircases, and large expanses of glass. It was named for Charles Halleck (1900–1986), a long-time member of the United States House of Representatives.

It was listed on the National Register of Historic Places in 2016.
