= Fountain Park Chautauqua =

- U.S. National Register of Historic Places
- U.S. Historic district
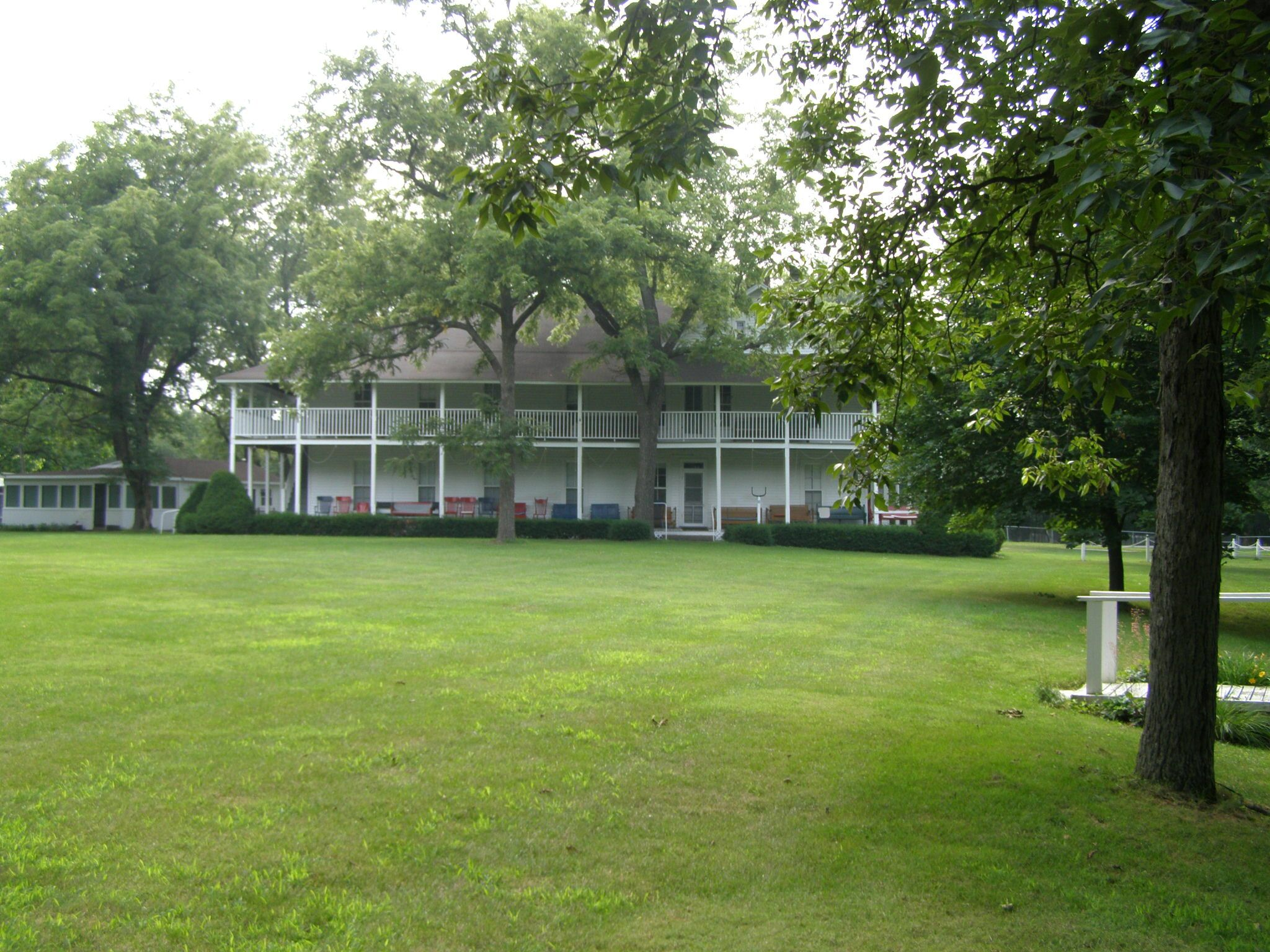

- Location within Indiana Location within the United States
- Location: 6244 W. Cty Rd. 1600S, Remington, Indiana
- Coordinates: 40°46′45″N 87°9′42″W
- Area: 17.3 acres (7.0 ha)
- Built: 1895
- Architectural style: Resort cottage
- NRHP reference No.: 01001351
- Added to NRHP: December 07, 2001

Since 1895, Fountain Park has hosted an annual Chatauqua to promote religious, social and educational activities. It was added to the National Register of Historic Places on December 7, 2001.

At one time there were an estimated 85 Chautauquas in Indiana alone. Of these, only six continue the Chautauqua tradition including the cities of Columbus, Jeffersonville, Madison, Merom, Remington, and Rome City. Most host weekend festivals for art competitions, music, crafts, and historical re-enactments. Fountain Park Chautauqua continues in the tradition of a two-week event, which includes Sunday School, church services as well as family-oriented entertainment including singing groups and bands, speakers, art classes, talent shows and other recreational activities. Fountain Park is one of a few with permanent structures that built specifically for the Chautauqua. These include a tabernacle, recreational building, hotel and seventy cottages.

== Chautauqua ==
The Chautauqua movement began in 1874. At the height of the movement, historians estimate that Chautauquas may have involved as many as 30 million people in 12,000 communities in a given summer. The Chautauqua movement began in 1874 in Chautauqua, New York, as a training camp for Sunday school teachers. The idea was that of a Methodist minister and Sunday School Superintendent, John H. Vincent and Lewis Miller respectively. The two men cofounded the Chautauqua Lake Sunday School Assembly Program. This program was aimed at religious education, but expanded to include music, art, and secular education. The idea spread quickly throughout the United States. Independent Chautauquas, modeled after the "Mother Chautauqua" in New York, sprang up all over the country. The Chautauqua movement hit its peak about 1924–1925. From the 1880s to the Great Depression, Chautauqua provided cultural and educational enrichment for thousands of isolated towns from New England to the Rocky Mountains.

== Chronology ==
Founded in 1895, a mile north of Remington in Jasper County, Indiana, Remington Bank's president, Robert Parker, envisioned an annual assembly to discuss various topics, including religion, science, and literature. In 1893, he purchased the land for Fountain Park. Recreational activities were part of program with boating, swimming, shuffleboard, and athletic contests. Parker purchased 70 acres (28 ha) of land in 1893 and "saw its natural beauty as an ideal place for an annual, out-of-doors assembly to be held for the people of Northwestern Indiana to meet to discuss religious, scientific and literary subjects." Before the first session, in 1895, Parker built a tabernacle and restaurant. The assembly lasted ten days at a cost of $1.00 per person. The Fountain Park Company was organized in 1897 with Parker as president. By 1898, a 36-room hotel had been built and a dam on Carpenter Creek to create a small lake for boating and swimming. The dam was removed because it obstructed water flow to Remington and other areas.

Between the close of the fourth session and the opening of the fifth session, the first permanent cottage was built by the Sherman "White family of Brook and the George Ball family of Kentland. As the number of cottages was growing, the owners expressed the wish that all tents and cottages be placed on the outer side of the grounds and that the grove be preserved intact. Fountain Park was becoming a popular destination with amenities which included telephone service, mail pickup and delivery, grocery service, mineral water from natural springs, tenting privileges, a hotel and restaurant. Its location, a 1 mile (1.6 km) from Remington, and its stop on the Pittsburgh, Cincinnati, Chicago and St. Louis Railroad line made it accessible from Chicago. Hacks operated from Remington on a schedule during the assemblies.

In 1901, the Pennsylvania Railroad offered special excursion rates. Its people were beginning to realize that the assembly brought into their midst advantages. Nationally known Temperance speakers, evangelists, politicians, poets and musicians performed at the Assembly, including ex-U.S. Senator John Ingalls, Billy Sunday, William Jennings Bryan (on four occasions), Paul Harvey, Governor Robert M. La Follette, World War I hero Pat O'Brien, and Mrs. Billy Sunday, the widow of the late Billy Sunday also delivered a short address. William Jennings Bryan and Pat OBrien had the highest attendance ratings in Fountain Park's history. An address by one Senator described Fountain Park by saying, "Under the shadow of the trees, in this happy little grove, in that rude structure (tabernacle) where nothing has been done for show during these past scores of years has been gathered annually the very best and brightest men and women the world has known, and their sweetest and brightest thoughts have been expressed for us who come to listen and to learn. Here was freedom; rest for the weary, pictures of a bright future; reminiscent of joys of the past. I don't believe there ever was another thirty acres in the world where so many great and good men and women met and gave free expressions to so many great and good thoughts in the same length of time. Religion, history, romance, right living, higher aims, education, music, good fellowship; everything except the sordid aim to accumulate money, here at its highest and best." .

Until 1902, the Assembly was operated as a Christian church project. That year it was incorporate with a capital stock of $24,000. In 1904, a Certificate of Incorporation was signed at capital stock of $30,000, which made it a joint stock company. The Fountain Park Company then leased the 30 acres from Robert Parker and his wife for the fee of $50 per year over the next 25 years.

In 1907, automobiles were first admitted. The original driveway used for hacks delivering patrons to the park was on the east side of the property where the fairgrounds were. With increasing use of automobiles, the gate on the west side of the park was opened in 1912 for autos only. Eventually both of these gates were closed and the north gate became the only way to enter or exit the grounds. In 1908, the founder, Robert Parker, resigned. In May 1909 Christian and Margaret Hensler purchased the property and leased approximately 30 acres of it for the use of Fountain Park. Later a lawsuit between the Hensler heirs and Fountain Park Company divided the 30 acres (12 ha) down to the current 17.3 acres (7.0 ha). The Women's Improvement Association was organized to help in beautifying and improving the grounds and buildings in 1911. The following year, an electric light system was installed. Fountain Park stayed open during the Great Depression and throughout both World Wars. During World War I all lights were turned off after the evening programs of 1918. The Great Depression the 1933 session pushed forward one week. In 1942, it was decided that Fountain Park would go on that year. Rationing due to World War II held down attendance in 1943. Between 1956 and 1961 major changes occurred. The old food stand was replaced, a new tabernacle was constructed, a new entrance gate was built on the north side, a new fountain was designed, and a new recreation hall was constructed. Fowler Methodist Church holds a family each year, the Boy and Girl Scouts and area schools, have used the grounds for day camps and other events.

== The Grounds ==
The Fountain Park Chautauqua is located north of Remington, Indiana, in a predominantly agricultural area of Jasper County. The 17.3 acres (7.0 ha) are heavily wooded with oak, hickory, walnut and wild cherry trees and run along Carpenter Creek. The camp contains small cottages with a few larger buildings for educational, recreational, and residential purposes. The main entrance is on the north side of the circular drive, which circles the camp. Six cottages and a few outbuildings, including two of the early privies, remain outside the loop created by the road.

At the center of the camp is a fountain and gazebo, thus the name "Fountain Park". Radiating around the interior circle created by the cottages are the Tabernacle, Recreation Building, Food and Candy Stands, the Art Colony and museum, and the Well House and Brick Shelter. Interspersed are the shuffleboard/bowling lanes, a basketball court, a playground, a series of benches/swings, and a variety of flower planters, two stone ones date back to 1932. The only public structure not located within the circle of the other public buildings is the hotel. It is on the west side of the grounds.

The design of the grounds contribute to the integrity of the district. The meandering perimeter road and the siting of cottages along the perimeter road has shaped a distinct space. Catalpa trees were planted to shade individual cottages. Catalpas were a popular in the 1800 and 1900s. Their broad leaves provide good shade and their flowers give a pleasant sweet scent in early summer. By 1917 there were forty-eight cottages located on the grounds. The cottages are built on small lots and placed very close together. The standard construction was a one and a half stories with a gable front and a one-story open front porch. The front facade usually contained a door and a window on the main floor and a single window centered in the gable above. Because of the small lots, the cottages were usually twice as deep as they were wide. Cottage number 32 is a good example of this style. Little decoration was used although a couple do have Gothic Revival: bargeboard trim, window hoods and arched windows. Because of the limited use, few of the cottages have fireplaces or chimneys.

Over time variations in style have developed. Most of the newer construction has been confined to the south on the far side of the road. Not all of the cottages are officially viewed as "contributing". These changes reflect the history of Fountain Park Chautauqua over the 105-year existence. Non-contributing buildings on the grounds are not out of scale with the historic structures. More recent cottages may have a lower roof pitch, or are constructed of concrete block. One structure is an A-frame design. All of the non-contributing cottages are sited on lots intended for dwellings and thus have similar presence on the site to the historic ones. In 1895, the association built a wooden rectangular tabernacle on the location of the current tabernacle. In 1960, they demolished the old tabernacle and built the current one. The current tabernacle, however, is wooden-sided, gable-roofed building of roughly the same dimensions as its predecessor.

== Structures ==
- The Brick Shelter is an open-air structure with a concrete foundation. It was built early in the history of Fountain Park. No exact date is known. There are four brick piers that support the exposed king post trusses of the gable roof. Originally there was a water tank and pump, which has been moved to create a public gathering area.
- The Hotel was constructed in 1898 on the northwest side of the camp. It had 36 rooms, reduced by 5 for the installation of indoor bathrooms, and a 130-seat dining room. It is L-shaped with seven bays on the south and east facades. One bay marks a doorway with a transom light above and the other six bays are four over four windows. It has a hipped roof, with two dormers at the ends of the east–west section. A two-story open porch that surround the building. There is an exterior stairway at the southwest corner of the porch that has the same square post railing as the porch upstairs.
- The Tabernacle is not the original structure. It site in the same location as the original from 1895. It is a rectangular-shaped building with vertical wood siding and a gable roof. The sides can be removed to allow for better ventilation. Large red, white, and blue awnings are extended to provide additional shelter for large groups. The main entry is on the west facade and opens onto a central aisle, leading to the stage. The stage if from the original tabernacle. The theater style seats hold 232 audience members. The ceiling is a series of open bowstring steel trusses and are painted white. There are modern fans and lights suspended from the trusses. The tabernacle was built in 1960 to replace the 1895 structure.
- Entry Gate was built in 1960. It is a small rectangular shed with an exterior of limestone and vertical wood siding. It has a shallow pitched, hipped roof with extended overhangs. The gates to either side of the driveways have matching limestone piers with wood railings.
- The fountain located near the center of the camp is not original. There has been a fountain throughout history of the park. An Indiana State Historical Marker is located next to the fountain commemorating the site.

== Bibliography ==
- Davies, Sandra, Kathleen Kelley, Freda Koch, et al. National Register of Historic Places Registration Form for Lancaster Methodist Episcopal Camp Ground Historic District. Completed 1987.
- Fountain Park Chautauqua Preserving Tradition for 100 Years. 100th Anniversary Newspaper. Remington, IN: The Remington Press. July 31, 1995.
- Fountain Park Lease Agreement November 9, 1954. Copy filed in Jasper County, Indiana Recorder's Office.
- Kandur-Smith, Karin Lynn, Hosier Chautauquas: Learning and sharing wisdom around^ Indiana, Outdoor Indiana, May/June 1996.
- Miles, Frank, Chautauqua in Indiana, Madison, Indiana, 1988
- Nelson, Sharon. "Highlights of 100 Years of Fountain Park" Printed in Fountain Park 100 Anniversary Book, 1995.
- Normand, Kipp Alien. Zion of Summer: The Winona Assembly and Sumner School Association 1895–1915, Notre Dame, IN: University of Notre Dame, 1989.
- Stanley, Karen. "The History of the Fountain Park Hotel" Compiled 1998.
- Tapk, John E., Circuit Chautauqua: From Rural Education to Popular Entertainment in Early Twentieth Century America,. Jefferson, N.G, McFarland, cl997.
- Walker, Amy. Series of interviews with Karen Stanley conducted July 6, 2000; July 13, 2000; July 27, 2000; August 4, 2000.
- Wooden, Helen O'Riley. Fountain Park Chautauqua: Oldest in Midwest 1954.

== See also ==
- Chautauqua
- Progressive Era
- Sisters of Providence of Saint Mary-of-the-Woods
