= Collegeville, Indiana =

- Census-designated place
- Location of Collegeville in Jasper County, Indiana
- Coordinates: 40°54′21″N 87°09′40″W
- Country: United States
- State: Indiana
- County: Jasper
- Township: Marion

Area
  - Total: 1.11 sq mi (2.88 km^{2})
  - Land: 1.11 sq mi (2.88 km^{2})
  - Water: 0 sq mi (0.00 km^{2})
- Elevation: 656 ft (200 m)

Population (2020)
  - Total: 84
  - Density: 75.5/sq mi (29.14/km^{2})
- Time zone: UTC-6 (Central (CST))
  - Summer (DST): UTC-5 (CDT)
- ZIP code: 47978
- Area code: 219
- FIPS code: 18-14464
- GNIS feature ID: 2393381

Collegeville is a census-designated place (CDP) in Jasper County, Indiana, United States. The population was 84 at the 2020 census. Collegeville is home to the now-unaccredited Saint Joseph's College, the source of the town's name.

== Geography ==
Collegeville is southwest of the center of Jasper County and is bordered to the northeast by Rensselaer, the county seat. U.S. Route 231 (South College Avenue) forms the eastern edge of the community. According to the United States Census Bureau, the CDP has a total area of 1.13 square miles (2.93 km^{2}), all land.

On July 14, 1936, the temperature in Collegeville rose to 116 °F (47 °C), the hottest temperature ever recorded in the state of Indiana.

== Demographics ==
Historical population
| Census | Pop. | Note | %± |
|---|---|---|---|
| 2020 | 84 | | — |
U.S. Decennial Census

As of the census of 2000, there were 865 people, 84 households, and 68 families residing in the CDP. The population density was 670.5 inhabitants per square mile (258.9/km^{2}). There were 90 housing units at an average density of 69.8 per square mile (26.9/km^{2}). The racial makeup of the CDP was 93.29% White, 4.16% African American, 0.35% Asian, 0.92% from other races, and 1.27% from two or more races. Hispanic or Latino of any race were 4.62% of the population.

There were 84 households, out of which 31.0% had children under the age of 18 living with them, 72.6% were married couples living together, 6.0% had a female householder with no husband present, and 19.0% were non-families. 16.7% of all households were made up of individuals, and 10.7% had someone living alone who was 65 years of age or older. The average household size was 2.51 and the average family size was 2.76.

In the CDP, the population was spread out, with 5.0% under the age of 18, 76.4% from 18 to 24, 6.4% from 25 to 44, 8.1% from 45 to 64, and 4.2% who were 65 years of age or older. The median age was 21 years. For every 100 females, there were 110.0 males. For every 100 females age 18 and over, there were 110.8 males.

The median income for a household in the CDP was $44,821, and the median income for a family was $51,071. Males had a median income of $53,542 versus $18,382 for females. The per capita income for the CDP was $8,587. About 15.4% of families and 19.5% of the population were below the poverty line, including 39.6% of those under age 18 and none of those age 65 or over.

== Education ==
It is within the Rensselaer Central School Corporation (K-12 school district).
