= Gillam Township, Jasper County, Indiana =

Gillam Township
- Township
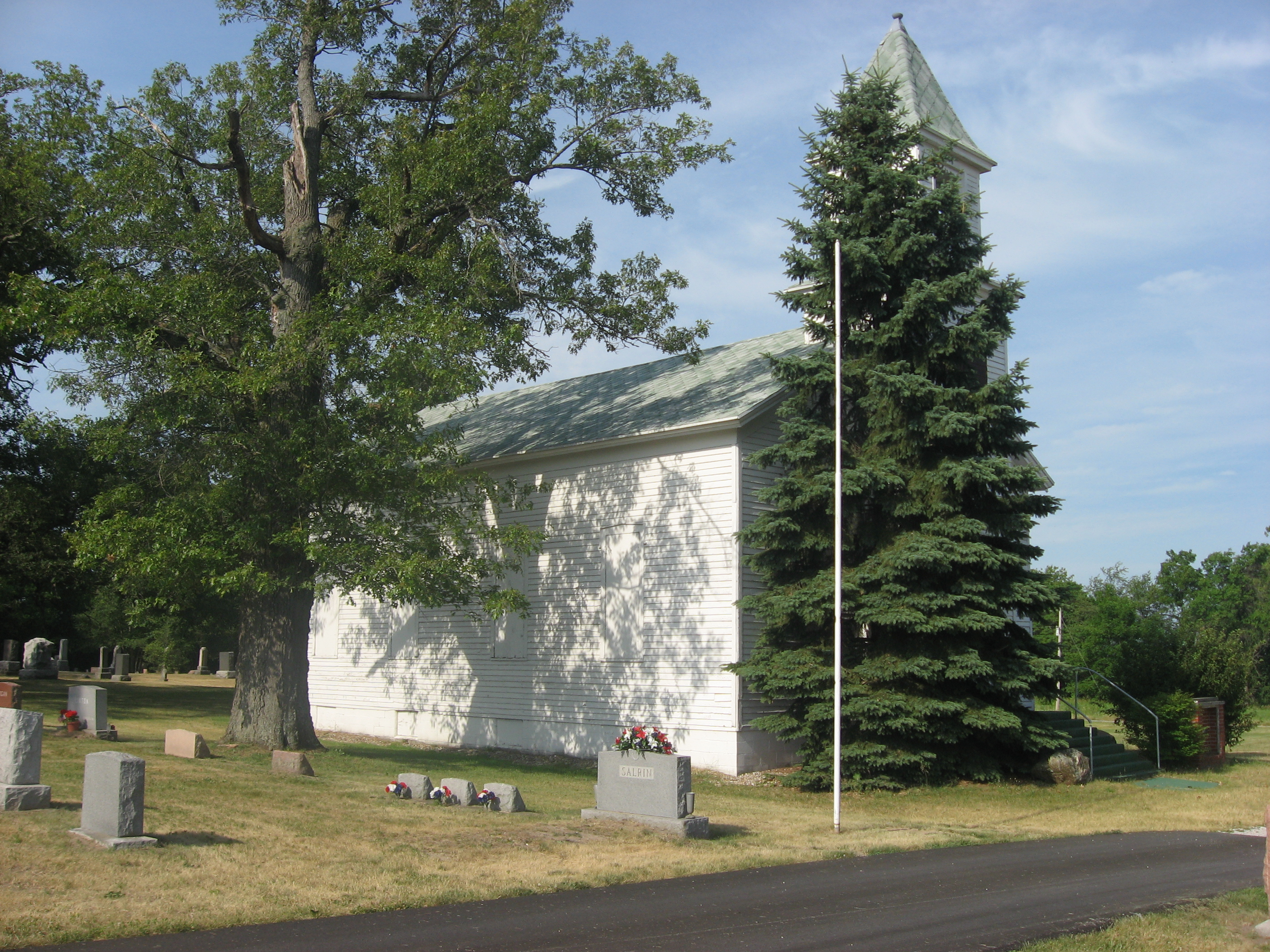
- Independence Methodist Church, a historic site in the township

- Location in Jasper County
- Coordinates: 41°03′24″N 86°57′52″W
- Country: United States
- State: Indiana
- County: Jasper

Government
  - Type: Indiana township

Area
  - Total: 38.23 sq mi (99.0 km^{2})
  - Land: 38.23 sq mi (99.0 km^{2})
  - Water: 0 sq mi (0 km^{2}) 0%
- Elevation: 690 ft (210 m)

Population (2020)
  - Total: 619
  - Density: 16.7/sq mi (6.4/km^{2})
- GNIS feature ID: 0453332

Gillam Township is one of thirteen townships in Jasper County, Indiana, United States. As of the 2020 census, its population was 619 (down from 640 at 2010) and it contained 201 housing units.

In 1832, the first permanent white settlement in the area was made in what is now Gilliam Township.

== History ==
Independence Methodist Church was listed on the National Register of Historic Places in 1982.

== Geography ==
According to the 2010 census, the township has a total area of 38.23 square miles (99.0 km^{2}), all land.

=== Unincorporated towns ===
- Baileys Corner

=== Adjacent townships ===
- Cass Township, Pulaski County (northeast)
- White Post Township, Pulaski County (east)
- Salem Township, Pulaski County (southeast)
- Hanging Grove Township (south)
- Barkley Township (west)
- Walker Township (northwest)

=== Cemeteries ===
The township contains two cemeteries: Mason and Robinson.

== Education ==
Gillam Township residents may request a free library card from the Jasper County Public Library.
