= Hugh and Leona Rank House =

Historic house in Indiana, United States

- U.S. National Register of Historic Places
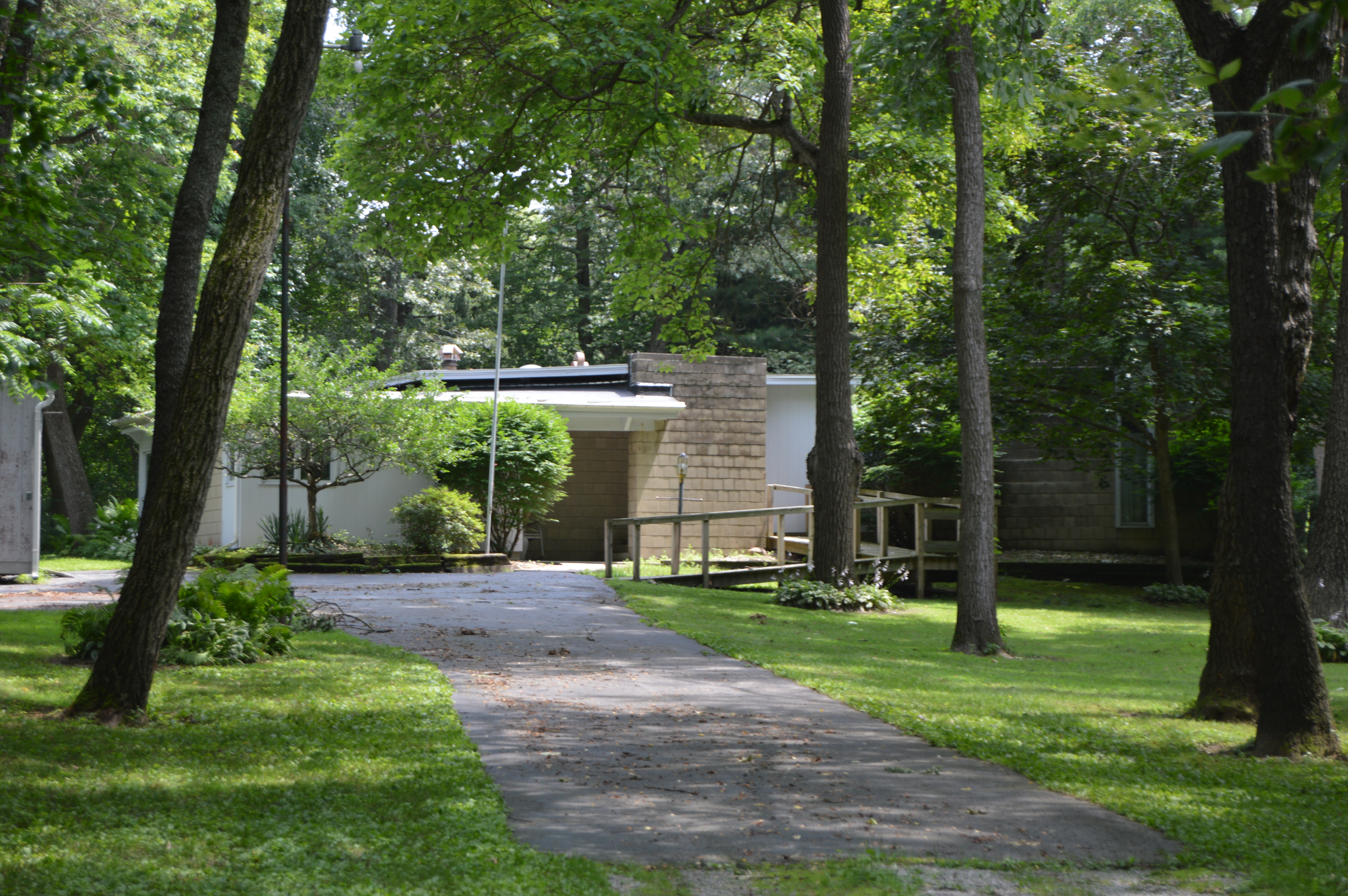
- Hugh and Leona Rank House, July 2016

- Location within Indiana Location within the United States
- Location: 975 Winding Rd., Marion Township, Jasper County, Indiana
- Coordinates: 40°54′47″N 87°09′35″W
- Area: Less than 1 acre (0.40 ha)
- Built: 1964
- Architect: Fischer, Frank
- Architectural style: International Style
- MPS: Modern Architecture of Rensselaer, Indiana
- NRHP reference No.: 16000332
- Added to NRHP: June 7, 2016

Hugh and Leona Rank House is a historic home located in Marion Township, Jasper County, Indiana. The International Style dwelling was built in 1964, and has a curved design constructed of concrete block and vertical wood siding. It is one-story with a flat roof and consists of a hallway circling a central interior courtyard to connect rooms fanning off of it.

It was listed on the National Register of Historic Places in 2016.
