= Schwietermann Hall =

- U.S. National Register of Historic Places
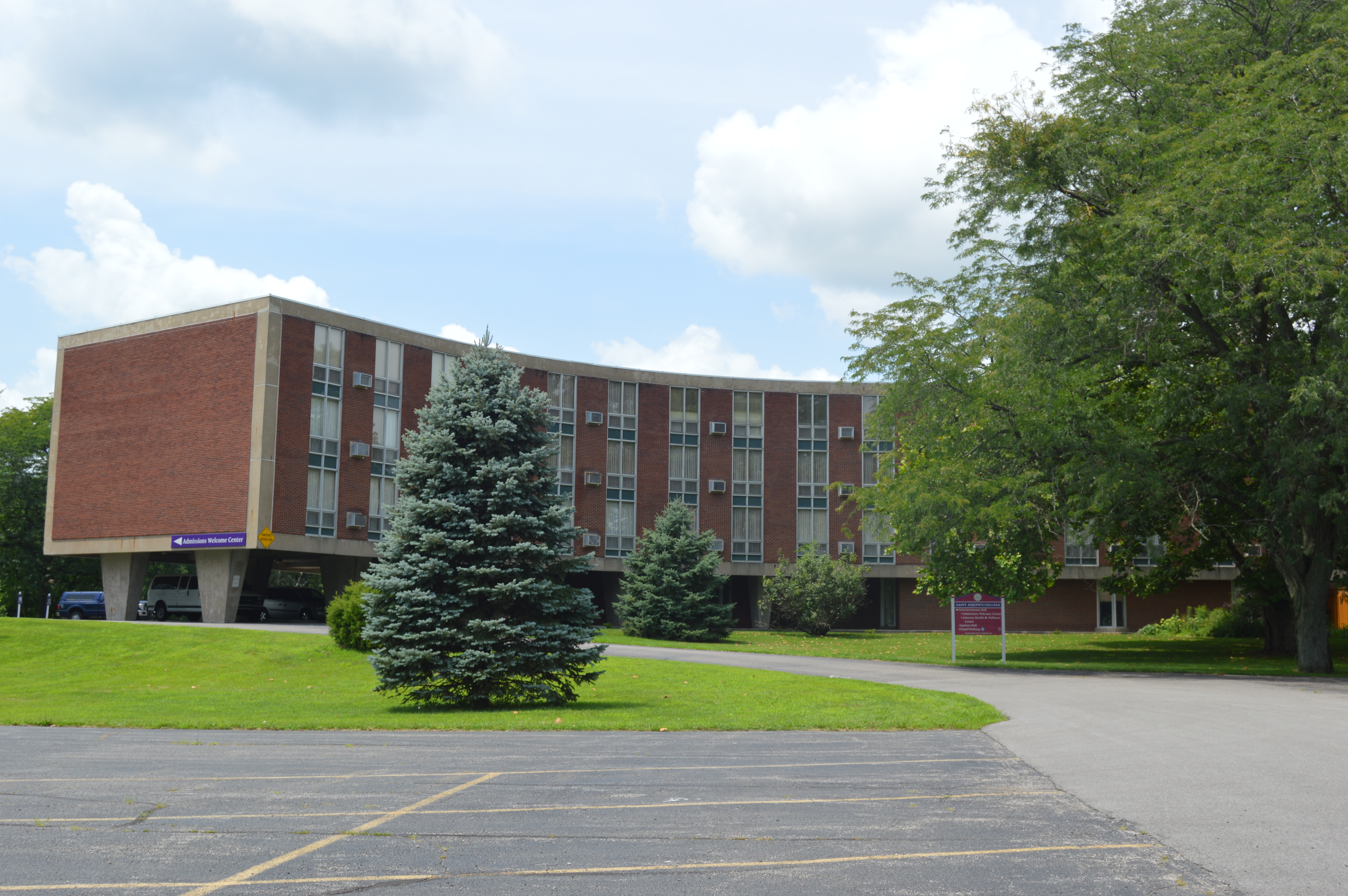
- Schwietermann Hall, July 2016

- Location within Indiana Location within the United States
- Location: Schuster Rd. (campus of Saint Joseph's College), Marion Township, Jasper County, Indiana
- Coordinates: 40°55′09″N 87°09′24″W
- Area: 1.09 acres (0.44 ha)
- Built: 1962
- Architect: Fischer, Frank
- Architectural style: International Style
- MPS: Modern Architecture of Rensselaer, Indiana
- NRHP reference No.: 16000333
- Added to NRHP: June 7, 2016

Schwietermann Hall is a historic dormitory building located on the campus of Saint Joseph's College in Marion Township, Jasper County, Indiana. The International Style building was built in 1962, and is a four-story, Y-shaped building composed of reddish-orange brick with concrete trim. The upper floors of the wings are supported by large, tapered concrete piers. A two-story connector connects the dormitory building and the main chapel on campus.

It was listed on the National Register of Historic Places in 2016.
