= Rensselaer, Indiana =

- City
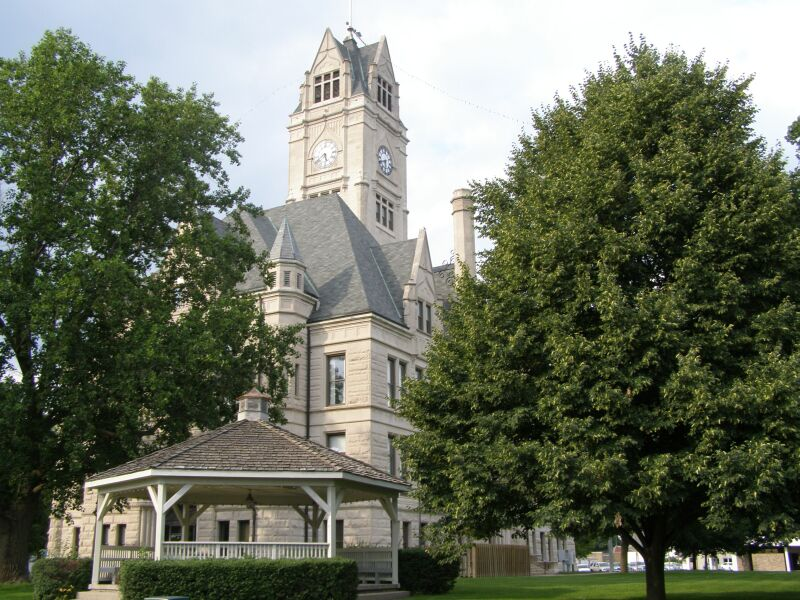
- Jasper County Courthouse

- Seal

- Location of Rensselaer in Jasper County, Indiana
- Coordinates: 40°56′15″N 87°10′06″W
- Country: United States
- State: Indiana
- County: Jasper
- Townships: Marion, Newton
- Platted: June 12, 1839
- Incorporated: December 8, 1858
- Named for: James Van Rensselaer

Government
  - Mayor: Jeff Phillips (R)

Area
  - Total: 6.73 sq mi (17.44 km^{2})
  - Land: 6.73 sq mi (17.43 km^{2})
  - Water: 0.0039 sq mi (0.01 km^{2})
- Elevation: 659 ft (201 m)

Population (2020)
  - Total: 5,733
  - Density: 852.1/sq mi (328.99/km^{2})
- Time zone: UTC-6 (CST)
  - Summer (DST): UTC-5 (CDT)
- ZIP code: 47978
- Area code: 219
- FIPS code: 18-63792
- GNIS feature ID: 2396349
- Website: www.rensselaer.in.gov

Rensselaer is a city located along the Iroquois River in Marion Township, Jasper County, Indiana, United States. The population was 5,733 at the 2020 census, down slightly from 5,859 at the 2010 census. The city is the county seat of Jasper County. Saint Joseph's College is located just south of the city limits.

== History ==
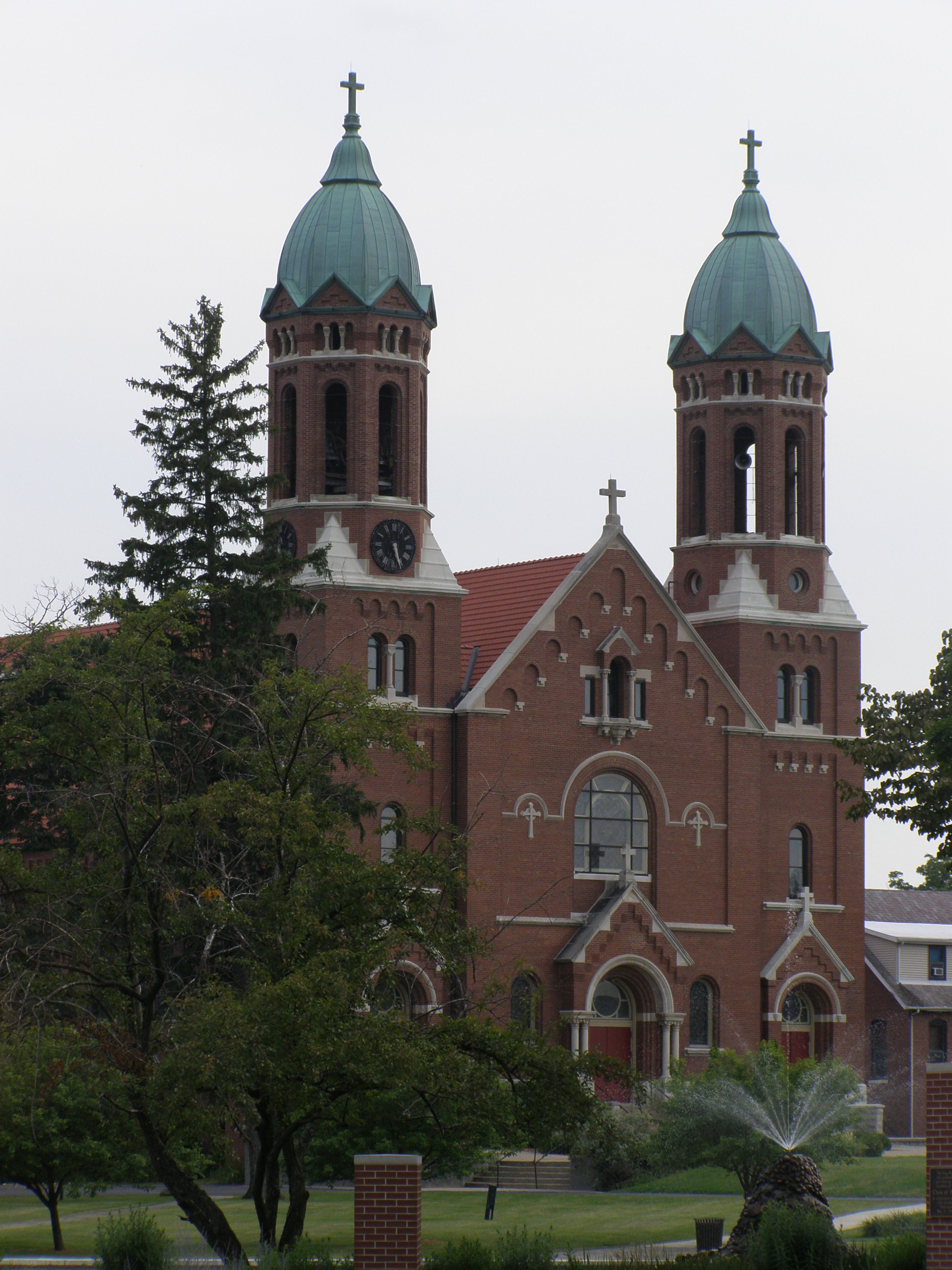
St. Joseph's College (church)

This settlement, first platted on June 12, 1839, was originally named "Newton" and was established at the rapids of the Iroquois River. By 1844, it had been renamed "Rensselaer", after James Van Rensselaer, a merchant from Utica, New York, who came to the area after his business failed in the Panic of 1837. He took over the land from Joseph D. Yeoman, who had established a farm some years earlier and had begun to plan the village.

St. Joseph Indian Normal School was established in 1888 by St. Katherine Drexel, an heiress from Philadelphia, who donated $50,000 for the education of Catholic American Indian boys. The school trained 60 boys annually until 1896. The school was operated by the Bureau of Catholic Indian Missions.

In addition to St. Joseph Indian Normal School, the Jasper County Courthouse, Oren F. and Adelia Parker House, Rensselaer Carnegie Library, and Rensselaer Courthouse Square Historic District are listed on the National Register of Historic Places.

== Geography ==
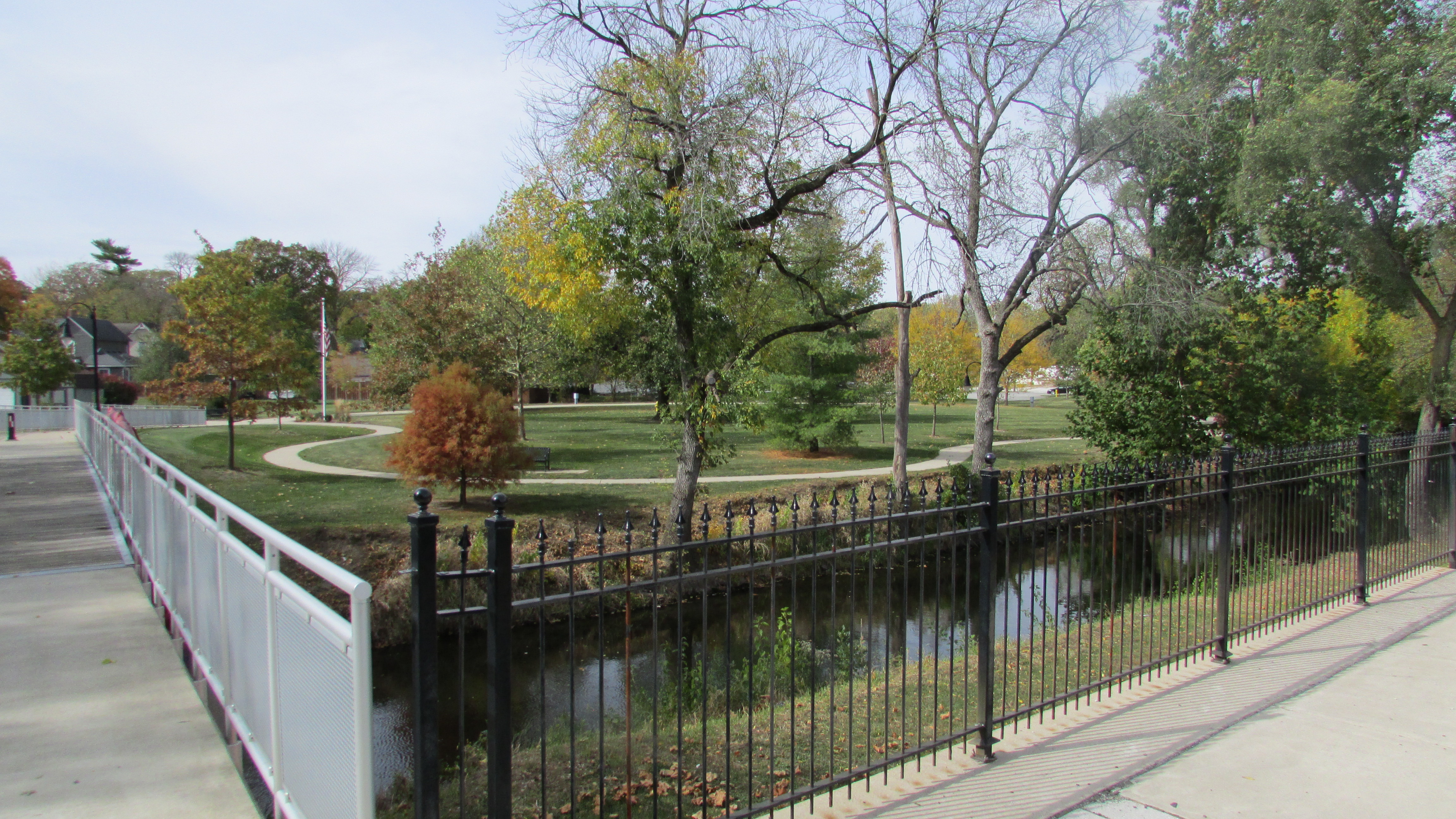
Iroquois River embankment

Rensselaer is located southwest of the center of Jasper County. It is bordered to the south by the unincorporated community of Collegeville, home to Saint Joseph's College. The Iroquois River, a tributary of the Kankakee River, hence part of the Illinois River watershed, flows from east to west through the southern part of the city.

U.S. Route 231 and Indiana State Road 114 intersect in the downtown area. US-231 leads north 20 miles (32 km) to DeMotte and south 12 miles (19 km) to Remington, while State Road 114 leads east 13 miles (21 km) to U.S. Route 421 and west 3.5 miles (5.6 km) to Interstate 65. Via I-65, Rensselaer is 42 miles (68 km) north of Lafayette and 54 miles (87 km) south of Gary.

According to the 2010 census, Rensselaer has a total area of 3.86 square miles (10.00 km^{2}), of which 3.8 square miles (9.84 km^{2}) (or 98.45%) is land and 0.06 square miles (0.16 km^{2}) (or 1.55%) is water.

=== Climate ===
Humid continental climate is a climatic classification typified by large seasonal temperature differences, with warm to hot (and often humid) summers and cold (sometimes severely cold) winters. Precipitation is relatively well distributed year-round in many areas with this climate, while others may see a marked reduction in wintry precipitation and even a wintertime drought. The Köppen Climate Classification subtype for this climate is "Dfa". (Hot Summer Continental Climate).

Climate data for Rensselaer, Indiana (1991–2020)
Month	Jan	Feb	Mar	Apr	May	Jun	Jul	Aug	Sep	Oct	Nov	Dec	Year
Mean daily maximum °F (°C)	32.0 (0.0)	36.5 (2.5)	48.1 (8.9)	61.1 (16.2)	72.3 (22.4)	81.4 (27.4)	83.9 (28.8)	82.5 (28.1)	77.2 (25.1)	64.1 (17.8)	49.1 (9.5)	37.0 (2.8)	60.4 (15.8)
Daily mean °F (°C)	24.0 (−4.4)	27.9 (−2.3)	38.4 (3.6)	50.0 (10.0)	61.5 (16.4)	70.9 (21.6)	73.6 (23.1)	71.8 (22.1)	65.2 (18.4)	52.7 (11.5)	40.2 (4.6)	29.5 (−1.4)	50.5 (10.3)
Mean daily minimum °F (°C)	16.1 (−8.8)	19.3 (−7.1)	28.7 (−1.8)	38.9 (3.8)	50.6 (10.3)	60.4 (15.8)	63.4 (17.4)	61.2 (16.2)	53.2 (11.8)	41.3 (5.2)	31.3 (−0.4)	21.9 (−5.6)	40.5 (4.7)
Average precipitation inches (mm)	2.58 (66)	2.04 (52)	2.71 (69)	3.88 (99)	4.34 (110)	4.78 (121)	4.49 (114)	4.01 (102)	3.24 (82)	3.18 (81)	2.59 (66)	2.25 (57)	40.09 (1,019)
Average snowfall inches (cm)	8.2 (21)	8.8 (22)	3.5 (8.9)	0.1 (0.25)	0.0 (0.0)	0.0 (0.0)	0.0 (0.0)	0.0 (0.0)	0.0 (0.0)	0.0 (0.0)	0.5 (1.3)	4.2 (11)	25.3 (64.45)
Source: NOAA

== Demographics ==
=== 2020 census ===
As of the 2020 census, Rensselaer had a population of 5,733. The median age was 39.1 years. 23.4% of residents were under the age of 18 and 18.2% of residents were 65 years of age or older. For every 100 females there were 96.1 males, and for every 100 females age 18 and over there were 92.2 males age 18 and over.

95.8% of residents lived in urban areas, while 4.2% lived in rural areas.

There were 2,384 households in Rensselaer, of which 29.0% had children under the age of 18 living in them. Of all households, 40.3% were married-couple households, 20.0% were households with a male householder and no spouse or partner present, and 30.5% were households with a female householder and no spouse or partner present. About 33.7% of all households were made up of individuals and 14.6% had someone living alone who was 65 years of age or older.

There were 2,607 housing units, of which 8.6% were vacant. The homeowner vacancy rate was 2.0% and the rental vacancy rate was 6.6%.

Racial composition as of the 2020 census
Race	Number	Percent
White	5,101	89.0%
Black or African American	38	0.7%
American Indian and Alaska Native	17	0.3%
Asian	19	0.3%
Native Hawaiian and Other Pacific Islander	3	0.1%
Some other race	215	3.8%
Two or more races	340	5.9%
Hispanic or Latino (of any race)	483	8.4%

=== 2010 census ===
Historical population
Census	Pop.	Note	%±
1850	241		—
1860	535		122.0%
1870	617		15.3%
1880	968		56.9%
1890	1,455		50.3%
1900	2,255		55.0%
1910	2,393		6.1%
1920	2,912		21.7%
1930	2,798		−3.9%
1940	3,214		14.9%
1950	4,072		26.7%
1960	4,740		16.4%
1970	4,688		−1.1%
1980	4,944		5.5%
1990	5,045		2.0%
2000	5,294		4.9%
2010	5,859		10.7%
2020	5,733		−2.2%
U.S. Decennial Census

At the 2010 census there were 5,859 people, 2,336 households, and 1,517 families living in the city. The population density was 1,541.8 inhabitants per square mile (595.3/km^{2}). There were 2,556 housing units at an average density of 672.6 per square mile (259.7/km^{2}). The racial makup of the city was 95.4% White, 0.7% African American, 0.4% Native American, 0.4% Asian, 0.1% Pacific Islander, 1.8% from other races, and 1.3% from two or more races. Hispanic or Latino of any race were 5.4%.

Of the 2,336 households 33.4% had children under the age of 18 living with them, 44.9% were married couples living together, 14.7% had a female householder with no husband present, 5.4% had a male householder with no wife present, and 35.1% were non-families. 29.5% of households were one person and 12.6% were one person aged 65 or older. The average household size was 2.42 and the average family size was 2.96.

The median age was 36.6 years. 25.5% of residents were under the age of 18; 8.7% were between the ages of 18 and 24; 25.6% were from 25 to 44; 23.7% were from 45 to 64; and 16.4% were 65 or older. The gender makeup of the city was 48.0% male and 52.0% female.

=== 2000 census ===
At the 2000 census there were 5,294 people, 2,158 households, and 1,404 families living in the city. The population density was 1,824.8 inhabitants per square mile (704.6/km^{2}). There were 2,296 housing units at an average density of 791.4 per square mile (305.6/km^{2}). The racial makup of the city was 97.94% White, 0.32% African American, 0.21% Native American, 0.09% Asian, 0.66% from other races, and 0.77% from two or more races. Hispanic or Latino of any race were 2.53%.

Of the 2,158 households 31.2% had children under the age of 18 living with them, 50.1% were married couples living together, 10.8% had a female householder with no husband present, and 34.9% were non-families. 31.1% of households were one person and 15.6% were one person aged 65 or older. The average household size was 2.37 and the average family size was 2.98.

The age distribution was 25.3% under the age of 18, 9.4% from 18 to 24, 26.9% from 25 to 44, 20.0% from 45 to 64, and 18.5% 65 or older. The median age was 36 years. For every 100 females, there were 89.0 males. For every 100 females age 18 and over, there were 83.4 males.

The median household income was $34,821 and the median family income was $43,313. Males had a median income of $33,971 versus $24,016 for females. The per capita income for the city was $20,872. About 6.6% of families and 10.0% of the population were below the poverty line, including 11.8% of those under age 18 and 8.0% of those age 65 or over.

== Education ==
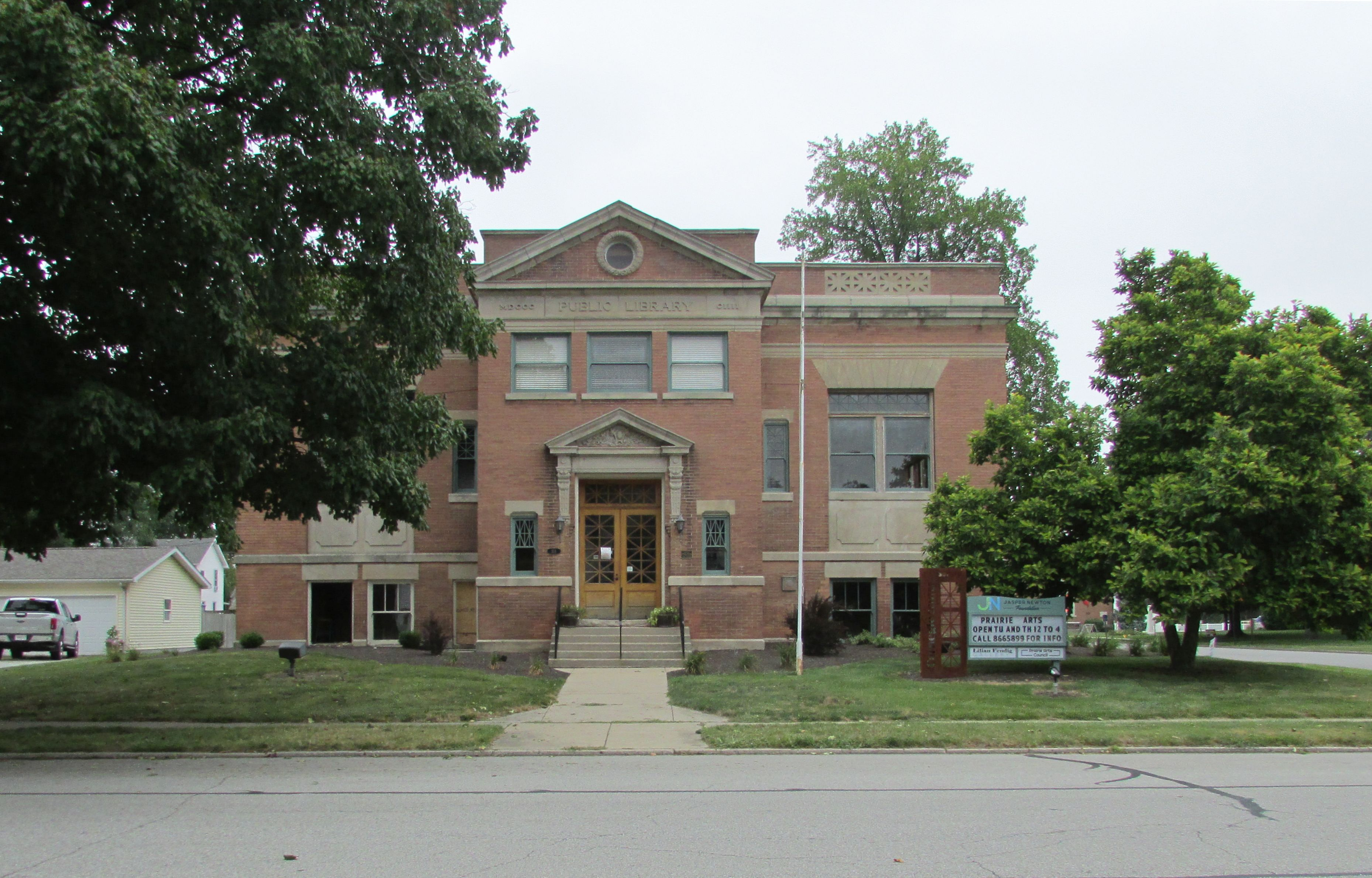
Rensselaer Carnegie Library

It is within the Rensselaer Central School Corporation (K-12 school district).

Rensselaer has a public library, a branch of the Jasper County Public Library.

Saint Joseph's College is in Rensselaer.

== Transportation ==
Rensselaer is served by Amtrak's Cardinal, which runs three days per week, stopping at the Rensselaer Amtrak station.

== Notable people ==
- Eleanor Stackhouse Atkinson, author
- Dan Brandenburg, National Football League player, Buffalo Bills 1996-1999
- Steve Buyer, former U.S. Representative
- Charles A. Halleck, Republican leader of the U.S. House of Representatives
- James Frederick "Jimmy" Hanley, American songwriter
- Tom Harmon, 1940 Heisman Trophy winner
- Eli Isom, professional wrestler
- Michael Stephen Kanne, Judge on the 7th Circuit Court of Appeals
- Robert H. Milroy, Major General in the Union Army during the American Civil War
- Augustus Phillips, actor during the silent film era
- Edison Marshall, short story writer and novelist
