= Remington Water Tower and Town Hall =

- U.S. National Register of Historic Places
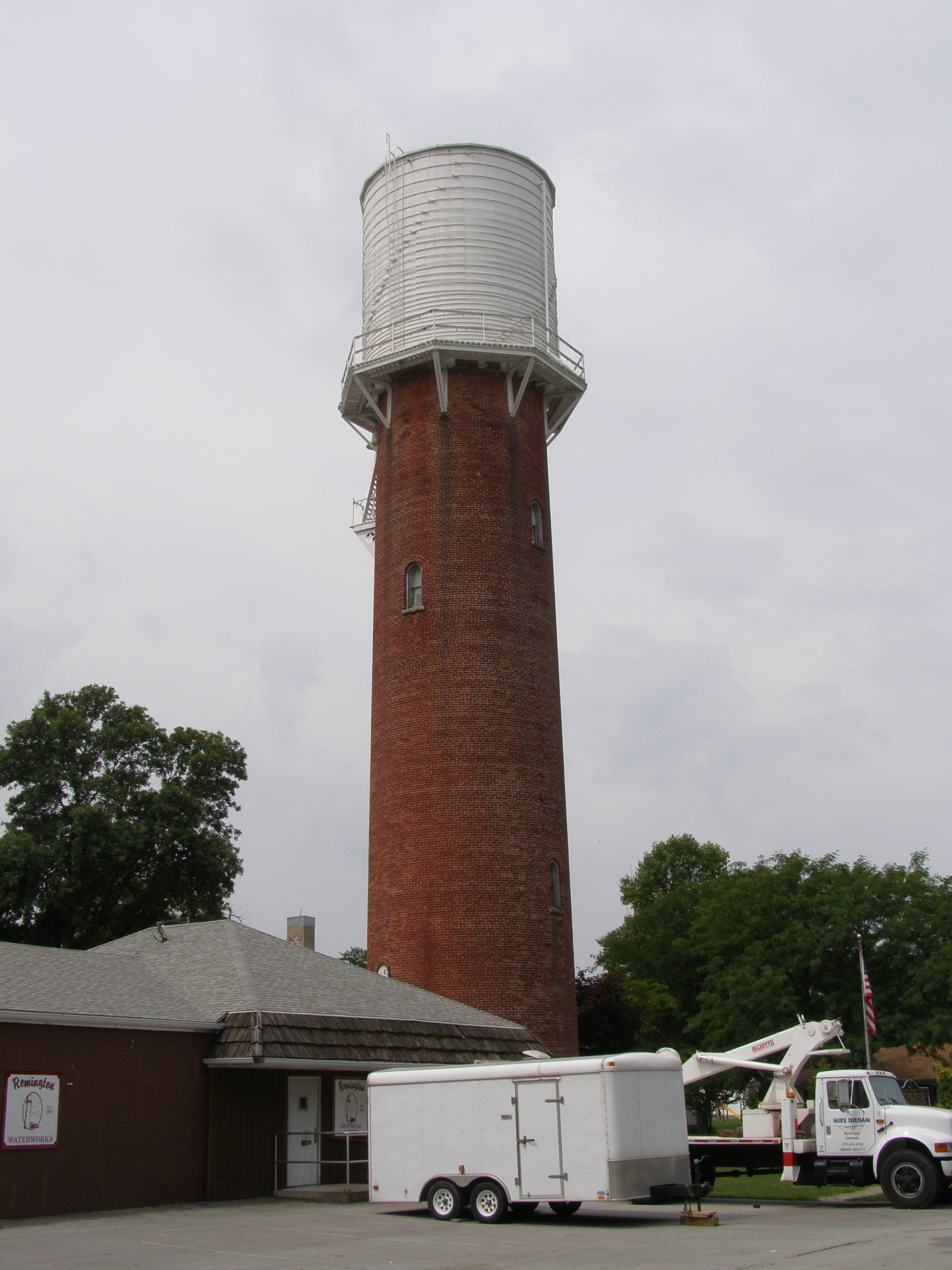

- Location within Indiana Location within the United States
- Location: 3 E. Michigan St., Remington, Indiana
- Coordinates: 40°45′43″N 87°9′3″W
- Area: less than one acre
- Built: 1897
- Architect: Challenge Wind Mill and Feed Mill Co
- NRHP reference No.: 03001314
- Added to NRHP: December 23, 2003

The Remington Water Tower and Town Hall were built in 1897 by Challenge Wind and Feed Mill Company of Batavia, Illinois. This is a rare wooden tank atop a brick tower type of water tower. Built on a limestone foundation, it is 140 feet (43 m) tall and about 20 feet (6.1 m) in diameter. The walls, painted common bond brick, are 2 feet (0.61 m) thick. The water tank holds 66,000 US gallons (250,000 L). The double semicircular header bond arched opening holds two ledged batten doors that open out. A dedication plaque from the Challenge Wind Mill and Feed Mill Company is affixed above the door. Spiraling up the water tower are a series of eight arched wood frame windows with limestone sills. There are two windows on each "side" facing the cardinal points. The low pitched gable roof is covered with asphalt shingles and conforms on the west end to the curve of the water tower.

The original tank was replaced by the Challenge Company in 1924. The tank is made of horizontal battens of cypress, held in place by metal binder rings. The roof of the water tank was originally cedar shingles but it was replaced in 2003 with plywood and rolled shingles. The 18 by 12 feet (5.5 by 3.7 m) single story brick structure on the east side may have housed the town hall. The water tower was in use until 1984 when a new water tower was built.

== Interior ==
The interiors of the tower and the town hall are covered with parging. The semicircular arch connecting the two has been altered to accommodate a rectangular door. Several pipes encumber the first floor of the water tower. There is a wood staircase leading up to the second floor. The floor itself was constructed of wood and repaired after a 1905 fire. From the second floor a narrow staircase spirals through the tower along the interior wall for about 70 feet (21 m). The staircase and floors were constructed from the scaffolding the workers used to build the tower. Then the exterior metal ladder and walkway must be used to access the tank. The town hall retains the pressed metal ceiling and cornice.

== History ==
The small farming community of Remington dates its founding to 1860. By 1870, the population reached 390. The needs of the town were growing and soon after there were three churches, a school, and several commercial buildings. Around 1887, a forty-foot tower was built near the town jail to house the fire bell. By 1890 when the town government had outgrown its jail building, the jail was sold to purchase a lot and school.

It was in the 1870s–80s that water systems spread rapidly across the country. The city of Rensselaer, the county seat of Jasper County, had a population of 4000 before it had the infrastructure to provide regular city water in 1900. In 1897 the Remington water tower made wells and cisterns obsolete for firefighting and drinking water.

== Awards ==
- American Water Landmark – from the American Water Works Association, 1986
- National Register of Historic Places, 2003, (Water supply infrastructure)

== Bibliography ==
- Atkinson, Ray E. "Remington Centennial Scrapbook, 1860–1960" Remington: Atkinson Studio, 1960.
- Challenge Wind Mill & Feed Mill Company Archives. Batavia Historical Society. Batavia, Illinois, 2003.
- Davis, Marsh. "Indiana Observed" Indiana Preservationist. July/August 1995.
- Hamilton, Louis H. & William Darroch, editors. A Standard History Jasper & Newton Counties, Indiana: An Authentic Narrative of the Past, With an Extended Survey of Modern Developments in the Progress of Town and Country. Volumes I and II. Chicago: The Lewis Publishing Company, 1916.
- Historic Landmarks Foundation of Indiana. Jasper County Interim Report: Indiana Historic Sites & Structures Inventory. Published May 2002.
- National Register of Historic Places nomination for the Benton Stone Water Tower, Lafayette County, Wisconsin, 1998.
- National Register of Historic Places nomination for the H. Black & Company Building, Cuyahoga County, Ohio. 2002.
- National Register of Historic Places nomination for the Ohio Hospital for Epileptics Stone Water Towers, Gallia County, Ohio, 1978.
- National Register of Historic Places nomination for the Ransom Water Tower, Ransom, Illinois, 1990.
- National Register of Historic Places nomination for the Sun Prairie Water Tower, Dane County, Wisconsin, 2000.
- Ohio Historic Preservation Office. Historic Inventory Cards for Water Towers. Columbus, Ohio, 1977–78.
- Remington Centennial Steering Committee. "Remington Centennial Historical Souvenir Book: 1860–1960"
- Royalty, James H. History of the Town of Remington & Vicinity, Jasper County, Indiana. Logansport, IN: Press of Wilson, Humphreys, & Co, 1894.
- Shearer, Robert B. "Remington, Then and Now" taken from History of Jasper County, Indiana. Jasper & Newton Counties Genealogical Society, 1985.
- Walker, Amy. Series of interviews with Mark Jones & Kay Brown in Remington, Indiana. July 6, 2000; July 14, 2000; August 1, 2000.
- Watermann, Earle L. Elements of Water Supply Engineering, New York: Wiley, 1934.
- Wealing, Stephanie. Interview with Bob Popeck, Batavia City Engineer. May 14, 2003.
