= Remington, Indiana =

- Town
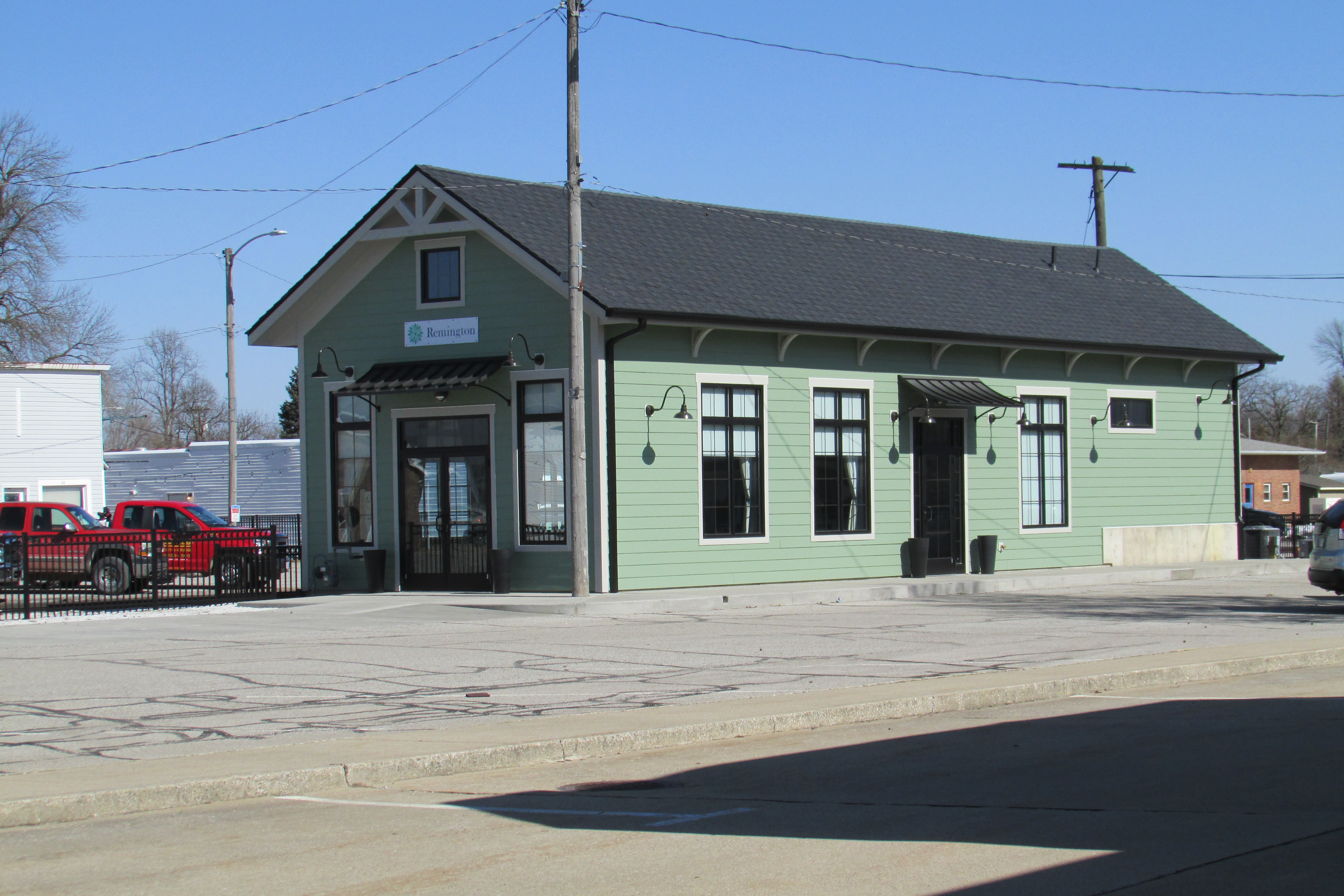
- Panhandle Railway Station.

- Flag

- Location of Remington in Jasper County, Indiana.
- Coordinates: 40°46′00″N 87°08′21″W
- Country: United States
- State: Indiana
- County: Jasper
- Township: Carpenter
- Platted: 1860

Area
  - Total: 3.84 sq mi (9.95 km^{2})
  - Land: 3.81 sq mi (9.88 km^{2})
  - Water: 0.027 sq mi (0.07 km^{2})
- Elevation: 725 ft (221 m)

Population (2020)
  - Total: 1,356
  - Density: 355.5/sq mi (137.26/km^{2})
- Time zone: UTC-5 (Eastern Standard Time (EST))
  - Summer (DST): UTC-5 (EST)
- ZIP code: 47977
- Area code: 219
- FIPS code: 18-63756
- GNIS feature ID: 2396873
- Website: www.remington.in.gov

Remington is a town in Carpenter Township, Jasper County, Indiana, United States. As of the 2020 census, Remington had a population of 1,356.

== History ==
Remington was first laid out in 1860 by Jesse H. Fordice. It was originally called Carpenter Station, after Carpenter's Creek where a railroad station had been established, around which the town grew. The name was later changed to Remington, after the founder of the general store. The main trade was in grain, as the area consisted of excellent prairie farmland; the town's position on the Pittsburgh, Chicago and St. Louis Railroad made it a good location for such trade. The first grain elevator was built in 1870 by Church and Hartley; the second was built by the Hathaway Brothers in 1872; and in 1879, James Irvin built a third. In 1883 the population was about 900.

Remington Water Tower and Town Hall was listed on the National Register of Historic Places in 2003.

== Geography ==
Remington is located about 90 miles northwest of Indianapolis and about 90 miles southeast of Chicago. It is about a mile west of Interstate 65; U.S. Route 24 and U.S. Route 231 pass through the town. Remington is located in the EST Time Zone.

According to the 2010 census, Remington has a total area of 1.02 square miles (2.64 km^{2}), all land.

== Demographics ==
Historical population
Census	Pop.	Note	%±
1870	390		—
1880	761		95.1%
1890	940		23.5%
1900	1,120		19.1%
1910	982		−12.3%
1920	1,044		6.3%
1930	879		−15.8%
1940	869		−1.1%
1950	1,053		21.2%
1960	1,207		14.6%
1970	1,127		−6.6%
1980	1,268		12.5%
1990	1,247		−1.7%
2000	1,323		6.1%
2010	1,185		−10.4%
2020	1,356		14.4%
U.S. Decennial Census

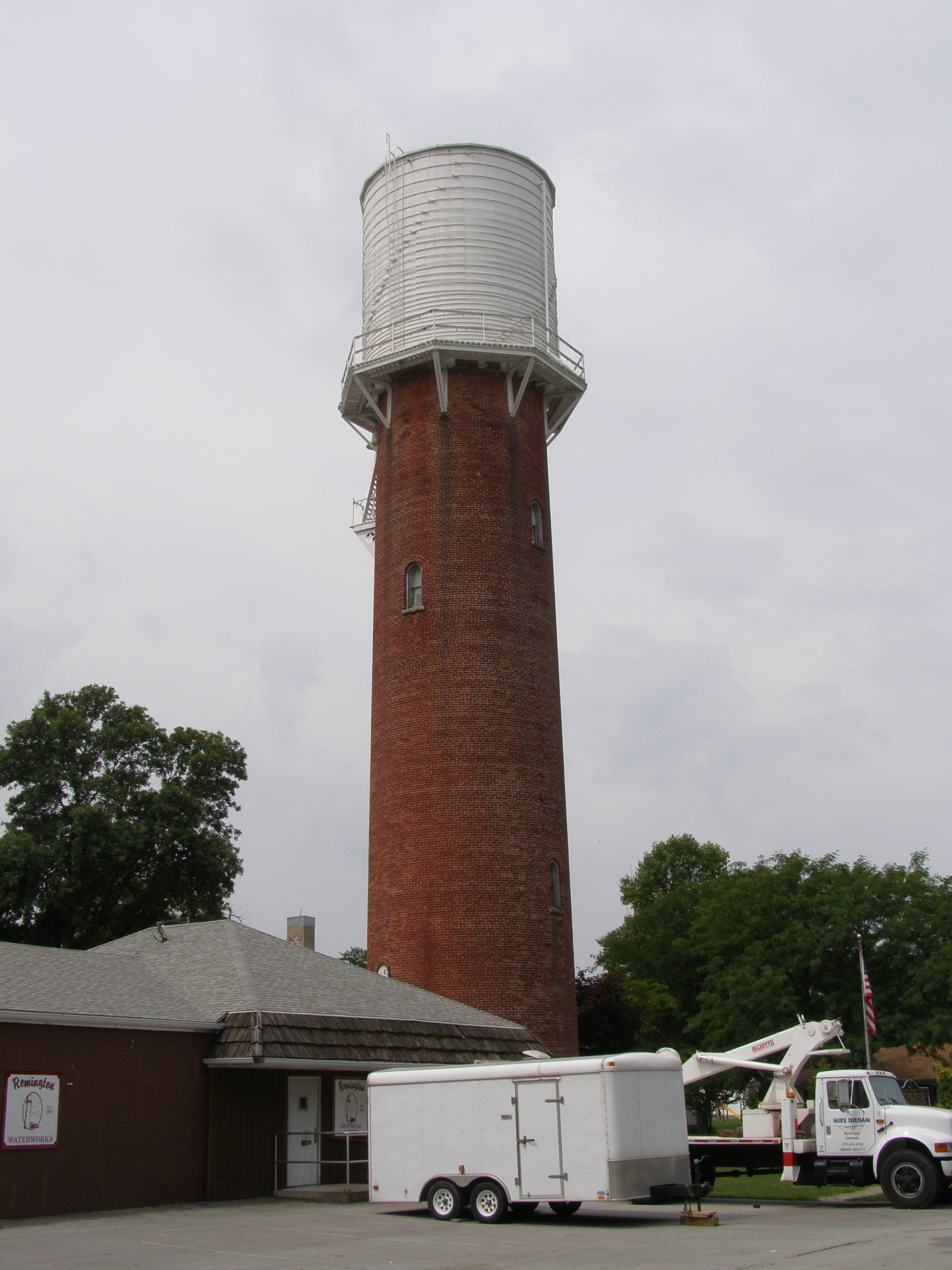
Original 1897 water tank

=== 2020 census ===
As of the 2020 census, Remington had a population of 1,356. The median age was 40.0 years. 23.5% of residents were under the age of 18 and 18.6% of residents were 65 years of age or older. For every 100 females there were 97.1 males, and for every 100 females age 18 and over there were 96.4 males age 18 and over.

0.0% of residents lived in urban areas, while 100.0% lived in rural areas.

There were 567 households in Remington, of which 27.5% had children under the age of 18 living in them. Of all households, 45.3% were married-couple households, 20.5% were households with a male householder and no spouse or partner present, and 24.3% were households with a female householder and no spouse or partner present. About 28.9% of all households were made up of individuals and 14.1% had someone living alone who was 65 years of age or older.

There were 613 housing units, of which 7.5% were vacant. The homeowner vacancy rate was 0.8% and the rental vacancy rate was 8.5%.

Racial composition as of the 2020 census
Race	Number	Percent
White	1,229	90.6%
Black or African American	11	0.8%
American Indian and Alaska Native	3	0.2%
Asian	7	0.5%
Native Hawaiian and Other Pacific Islander	1	0.1%
Some other race	30	2.2%
Two or more races	75	5.5%
Hispanic or Latino (of any race)	63	4.6%

=== 2010 census ===
As of the census of 2010, there were 1,185 people, 503 households, and 329 families living in the town. The population density was 1,161.8 inhabitants per square mile (448.6/km^{2}). There were 569 housing units at an average density of 557.8 per square mile (215.4/km^{2}). The racial makeup of the town was 96.5% White, 0.6% African American, 0.1% Native American, 0.3% Asian, 0.1% Pacific Islander, 0.3% from other races, and 2.2% from two or more races. Hispanic or Latino of any race were 3.1% of the population.

There were 503 households, of which 33.2% had children under the age of 18 living with them, 48.1% were married couples living together, 10.3% had a female householder with no husband present, 7.0% had a male householder with no wife present, and 34.6% were non-families. 29.6% of all households were made up of individuals, and 14.1% had someone living alone who was 65 years of age or older. The average household size was 2.36 and the average family size was 2.91.

The median age in the town was 39.8 years. 24.8% of residents were under the age of 18; 8.6% were between the ages of 18 and 24; 23.2% were from 25 to 44; 27.3% were from 45 to 64; and 16.1% were 65 years of age or older. The gender makeup of the town was 48.8% male and 51.2% female.

=== 2000 census ===
As of the census of 2000, there were 1,323 people, 532 households, and 353 families living in the town. The population density was 1,279.7 inhabitants per square mile (494.1/km^{2}). There were 557 housing units at an average density of 538.8 per square mile (208.0/km^{2}). The racial makeup of the town was 98.72% White, 0.15% African American, 0.68% Asian, 0.08% from other races, and 0.38% from two or more races. Hispanic or Latino of any race were 1.06% of the population.

There were 532 households, out of which 33.5% had children under the age of 18 living with them, 53.9% were married couples living together, 8.6% had a female householder with no husband present, and 33.6% were non-families. 28.2% of all households were made up of individuals, and 14.8% had someone living alone who was 65 years of age or older. The average household size was 2.49 and the average family size was 3.06.

In the town, the population was spread out, with 27.7% under the age of 18, 9.1% from 18 to 24, 27.9% from 25 to 44, 20.8% from 45 to 64, and 14.5% who were 65 years of age or older. The median age was 36 years. For every 100 females, there were 94.0 males. For every 100 females age 18 and over, there were 85.5 males.

The median income for a household in the town was $37,037, and the median income for a family was $45,735. Males had a median income of $34,135 versus $20,833 for females. The per capita income for the town was $17,184. About 4.4% of families and 7.5% of the population were below the poverty line, including 8.4% of those under age 18 and 7.1% of those age 65 or over.

== Education ==
The town has a lending library, the Remington-Carpenter Township Public Library.

== Notable people ==
- Frances Janssen, All-American Girls Professional Baseball League player and Northern Indiana Historical Society researcher
- George D. Major, American politician, agriculturist, businessman, and former owner and proprietor of “The Remington Press”.
- David H. Patton, Doctor of Medicine and U.S. Representative from Indiana
- Randall Tobias, chief executive officer of Eli Lily and Company.
