= Jackie Haas (politician) =

American politician

Member of the Illinois House of Representatives from the 79th district
- Incumbent
- Assumed office December 8, 2020
- Preceded by: Lindsay Parkhurst

Personal details
- Born: 1966-1967 (age 59–60) Momence, Illinois, U.S.
- Party: Republican
- Spouse: Bill Haas
- Children: 2
- Education: Valparaiso University (BSW); University of Illinois (MSW)
- Occupation: Social worker Legislator

Jackie Haas is a Republican member of the Illinois House from the 79th district since her appointment on December 8, 2020. The 79th district, located mostly in the Chicago area, includes all or parts of Aroma Park, Beecher, Bonfield, Bourbonnais, Braceville, Bradley, Buckingham, Cabery, Chebanse, Coal City, Diamond, East Brooklyn, Essex, Gardner, Godley, Herscher, Hopkins Park, Irwin, Kankakee, Limestone, Momence, Peotone, Reddick, Sammons Point, South Wilmington, St. Anne, Sun River Terrace, and Union Hill.

== Early life, education, and career ==
Haas was born in Momence, Illinois. She was raised in Momence and attended St. Patrick's Grade School. She graduated from Bishop McNamara Catholic High School in 1984. She graduated from Valparaiso University in 1988 with a Bachelor of Social Work and graduated from the Jane Addams College of Social Work at the University of Illinois at Chicago with a Master of Social Work. She was a social worker for Riverside Medical Center. She joined the Helen Wheeler Center for Community Health in 1994 and has served as its CEO since 2000. She was appointed to and served on the Kankakee County Board from 2018 to 2020.

== Illinois House of Representatives ==
Haas was elected to succeed outgoing incumbent Lindsay Parkhurst. Parkhurst resigned from the Illinois House of Representatives upon being sworn in as a judge on December 7, 2020. Previously elected in the 2020 General Election, Haas was appointed to fill the remainder of Parkhurst's unexpired term. In her official capacity as a judge, Parkhurst swore in Haas as State Representative of the 79th District on December 8, 2020.

As of July 3, 2022, Representative Haas is a member of the following Illinois House committees:

- Appropriations - Elementary & Secondary Education Committee (HAPE)
- Appropriations - Human Services Committee (HAPH)
- Health Care Availability & Access Committee (HHCA)
- Human Services Committee (HHSV)
- Immigration & Human Rights Committee (SIHR)
- Medicaid Subcommittee (HHSV-MEDI)
- Mental Health & Addiction Committee (HMEH)
- Prescription Drug Affordability Committee (HPDA)

== Electoral history ==
Illinois 79th State House District Republican Primary, 2020
Party	Candidate	Votes	%
Republican	Jackie Haas	6,741	100.0
Total votes		6,741	100.0

Illinois 79th State House District General Election, 2020
Party	Candidate	Votes	%
Republican	Jackie Haas	29,540	63.77
Democratic	Charlene Eads	16,780	36.23
Total votes		46,320	100.0

== Personal life ==
She and her husband Bill have two adult children and currently reside in Bourbonnais, Illinois.
