= Tornado outbreak sequence of April 5–8, 1954 =

Weather event in the United States

Tornado outbreak sequence of April 5–9, 1954
Tornado outbreak
- Tornadoes: 25
- Max. rating: F4 tornado
- Duration: April 5–8, 1954

Overall effects
- Fatalities: 1
- Injuries: 22
- Damage: $999,330 ($11,980,000 in 2025 USD) (Note: All losses are in 1954 USD unless otherwise noted.)
- Areas affected: Central and Southern United States
- Part of the tornadoes and tornado outbreaks of 1954

From April 5–8, 1954, a tornado outbreak sequence affected portions of the Central and Southern United States, primarily the Upper Midwest. The U.S. states of Illinois, Iowa, Missouri, and Wisconsin were hardest hit by tornadoes. The first day of the severe weather event featured three intense (F3 or stronger) tornadoes along the Missouri–Iowa border, including a long-tracked F4 that obliterated rural farmsteads. The deadliest tornado of the sequence, retroactively rated F3, struck Illinois a few days later, killing one person and injuring 13 others. Other strong tornadoes hit Kansas, Indiana, Michigan, and Georgia during the sequence. In all, the event resulted in 22 injuries. (Note: An outbreak is generally defined as a group of at least six tornadoes (the number sometimes varies slightly according to local climatology) with no more than a six-hour gap between individual tornadoes. An outbreak sequence, prior to (after) the start of modern records in 1950, is defined as a period of no more than two (one) consecutive days without at least one significant (F2 or stronger) tornado.)

== Confirmed tornadoes ==
Confirmed tornadoes by Fujita rating
FU	F0	F1	F2	F3	F4	F5	Total
0	1	7	11	5	1	0	25

Prior to 1990, there is a likely undercount of tornadoes, particularly E/F0–1, with reports of weaker tornadoes becoming more common as population increased. A sharp increase in the annual average E/F0–1 count by approximately 200 tornadoes was noted upon the implementation of NEXRAD Doppler weather radar in 1990–1991. (Note: Historically, the number of tornadoes globally and in the United States was and is likely underrepresented: research by Grazulis on annual tornado activity suggests that, as of 2001, only 53% of yearly U.S. tornadoes were officially recorded. Documentation of tornadoes outside the United States was historically less exhaustive, owing to the lack of monitors in many nations and, in some cases, to internal political controls on public information. Most countries only recorded tornadoes that produced severe damage or loss of life. Significant low biases in U.S. tornado counts likely occurred through the early 1990s, when advanced NEXRAD was first installed and the National Weather Service began comprehensively verifying tornado occurrences.) 1974 marked the first year where significant tornado (E/F2+) counts became homogenous with contemporary values, attributed to the consistent implementation of Fujita scale assessments. (Note: The Fujita scale was devised under the aegis of scientist T. Theodore Fujita in the early 1970s. Prior to the advent of the scale in 1971, tornadoes in the United States were officially unrated. Tornado ratings were retroactively applied to events prior to the formal adoption of the F-scale by the National Weather Service. While the Fujita scale has been superseded by the Enhanced Fujita scale in the U.S. since February 1, 2007, Canada used the old scale until April 1, 2013; nations elsewhere, like the United Kingdom, apply other classifications such as the TORRO scale.) Numerous discrepancies on the details of tornadoes in this outbreak exist between sources. The total count of tornadoes and ratings differs from various agencies accordingly. The list below documents information from the most contemporary official sources alongside assessments from tornado historian Thomas P. Grazulis.

Color/symbol key
Color / symbol	Description
†	Data from Grazulis 1990/1993/2001b
¶	Data from a local National Weather Service office
※	Data from the 1954 Climatological Data National Summary publication
‡	Data from the NCEI database
♯	Maximum width of tornado
±	Tornado was rated below F2 intensity by Grazulis but a specific rating is unavailable.

=== April 5 event ===
Confirmed tornadoes – Monday, April 5, 1954 (Note: All dates are based on the local time zone where the tornado touched down; however, all times are in Coordinated Universal Time and dates are split at midnight CST/CDT for consistency.)
F#	Location	County / Parish	State	Start Coord. (Note: All starting coordinates are based on the NCEI database and may not reflect contemporary analyses)	Time (UTC)	Path length	Width (Note: The listed width values are primarily the average/mean width of the tornadoes, with those having known maximum widths denoted by ♯. From 1952 to 1994, reports largely list mean width whereas contemporary years list maximum width. Values provided by Grazulis are the average width, with estimates being rounded down (i.e. 0.5 mi (0.80 km) is rounded down from 880 yards to 800 yards.)	Damage
F1	Mexico※	Audrain	Missouri	39.38°N 91.93°W	08:00–?	0.2 mi (0.32 km)	10 yd (9.1 m)	$2,500
F1	This and the following event destroyed a home. Outbuildings were wrecked or damaged as well. Agricultural implements were also damaged.							
F1	S of Benton City	Audrain	Missouri	39.10°N 91.77°W	08:00–?	0.3 mi (0.48 km)	17 yd (16 m)	$25,000
F1	See previous event.							
F3†	E of Scranton to NW of Farlin	Greene	Iowa	42.03°N 94.53°W	23:10–?	7 mi (11 km)†	800 yd (730 m)†	$100,000※
F3†	This intense tornado badly damaged five farmsteads and caused less severe damage to 13 others. One or more farmhouses were wrecked, and a boxcar was lofted through the air. Timbers also pierced the walls of homes. An injury occurred.							
F3†	NW of Westboro (MO)† to SE of Northboro (IA)※	Atchison (MO), Page (IA)	Missouri, Iowa	40.55°N 95.38°W	23:30–?†	8 mi (13 km)†	500 yd (460 m)†	$200,000†
F3†	This was probably a family of "twin" tornadoes that damaged farmsteads at "near-F4" intensity. A pickup truck in Missouri was tossed 300 yd (900 ft), and four homes were torn apart in that state. Three additional homes were wrecked in Iowa. A few injuries occurred, both in Missouri.							
F4†	Near Elmo (MO) to S of Braddyville (IA) to N of Bedford (IA)†	Nodaway (MO)†, Page (IA), Taylor (IA)†	Missouri, Iowa	40.60°N 95.23°W	23:30–?	25 mi (40 km)†	900 yd (820 m)†	Unknown
F4†	This long-lived, violent tornado caused F4 damage to numerous farms. A pair of farmhouses were obliterated northwest of Siam, Iowa.							
F2±	W to NE of Bedford	Taylor	Iowa	40.67°N 94.88°W	23:45–?	11.5 mi (18.5 km)	333 yd (304 m)	$250
F2±	Details are unavailable.							
F2†	NW of Bedford	Taylor	Iowa	40.68°N 94.73°W	00:15–?	5 mi (8.0 km)†	200 yd (180 m)	$250
F2†	A pair of spacious barns were blown to pieces, their debris strewn "for miles". 20 farmsteads received some manner of wind-related damage, and livestock in the path was killed.							
F2±	N of Milford to ESE of Riley	Geary	Kansas	39.18°N 96.92°W	00:45–?	9 mi (14 km)※	33 yd (30 m)	Unknown
F2±	This tornado damaged many farms in or near Fort Riley.							
F1	S of Soldier※	Jackson	Kansas	39.37°N 95.95°W	01:30–?	5 mi (8.0 km)※	100 yd (91 m)	$5,000※
F1	Rural trees and structures were damaged.							
F2+	ESE of Northboro	Page	Iowa	Unknown	Unknown	Unknown	Unknown	Unknown
F2+	A short-lived tornado, related to the Westboro F3, tore the roof off a home.							

=== April 6 event ===
Confirmed tornadoes – Tuesday, April 6, 1954
F#	Location	County / Parish	State	Start Coord.	Time (UTC)	Path length	Width	Damage
F1	ENE of Wheatland	Knox	Indiana	38.67°N 87.28°W	10:00–?	0.1 mi (0.16 km)	27 yd (25 m)	$4,000※
F1	Some buildings were stripped of their roofs. Fallen roofing damaged a truck.							
F1	Glezen※	Pike	Indiana	38.50°N 87.28°W	11:00–?	1 mi (1.6 km)	33 yd (30 m)	$5,000※
F1	This tornado damaged a pair of houses and a few barns, along with the roof of a store. A few porches were ripped off, one of which was stripped of most roofing.							
F2±	Eastern Ferdinand to SSE of Saint Anthony	Dubois	Indiana	38.23°N 86.85°W	13:00–?	3.3 mi (5.3 km)	33 yd (30 m)	$6,000※
F2±	This tornado hit many homes and a church, damaging their roofs. Garages and barns were affected as well.							
F1	Petersburg	Pike	Indiana	38.50°N 87.28°W	20:00–?	0.1 mi (0.16 km)	33 yd (30 m)	$800※
F1	A chicken coop was destroyed.							

=== April 7 event ===
Confirmed tornadoes – Wednesday, April 7, 1954
F#	Location	County / Parish	State	Start Coord.	Time (UTC)	Path length	Width	Damage
F3†	N of Highland to SE of Avoca※	Iowa	Wisconsin	43.13°N 90.38°W	11:45–?	8 mi (13 km)†	400 yd (370 m)	$60,000※
F3†	This intense tornado leveled several barns and destroyed a farmhouse. It also damaged seven other farmhouses and destroyed or damaged 50 outbuildings. Four people were injured.							
F2±	E of Mount Calvary※	Fond du Lac	Wisconsin	43.70°N 88.53°W	18:30–?	1.9 mi (3.1 km)	33 yd (30 m)	$2,500
F2±	This tornado collapsed a 60-by-40-foot (20 by 13 yd) barn, crushing to death five cattle beneath. It also uplifted a 140-foot-long (47 yd) section of roofing and tore a 400-pound (180 kg) concrete covering off a silo. Strong winds in Mount Calvary also downed a few television transmission towers and shattered windows.							
F1	Oconomowoc	Waukesha	Wisconsin	43.10°N 88.52°W	19:15–?	Unknown	Unknown	$25,000
F1	This tornado crossed downtown Oconomowoc, splintering trees and television antennae. It damaged 13 businesses in town, smashed plate glass, and tore off roofing.							
F3±	SW of Saunemin	Livingston	Illinois	40.88°N 88.42°W	21:00–?	13 mi (21 km)	400 yd (370 m)	$250,000
F3±	This, the first member of a two-tornado family, dissipated and reformed as the Kankakee County F3.							
F2†	NE of Neshkoro to Lohrville to Redgranite	Waushara	Wisconsin	Unknown	21:00–?	5 mi (8.0 km)	30 yd (27 m)	Unknown
F2†	This tornado destroyed one or more barns.							
F3	Limestone Township† to Indian Oaks to W of Grant Park	Kankakee	Illinois	41.00°N 88.22°W	21:35–?†	16 mi (26 km)†	400 yd (370 m)	$250,000
F3	1 death – This intense tornado struck 30 farms, destroying many structures. It also damaged or destroyed 38 homes, as well as most of Indian Oaks. Empty storage tanks were carried more than 1 mi (1.6 km). 13 people were injured. The NCEI incorrectly begin this event west of Cabery.							
F2†	E of Albion to SE of Kendallville†	Noble	Indiana	41.43°N 85.28°W	23:50–?	6 mi (9.7 km)†	Unknown	$30,000†
F2†	This strong tornado leveled trees, wrecked two or more barns, and damaged the roofs of homes. Livestock was killed as well.							
F2†	WNW of Fulton	Kalamazoo	Michigan	42.12°N 85.37°W	00:00–?	1 mi (1.6 km)†	30 yd (27 m)†	Unknown
F2†	A few barns were wrecked.							

=== April 8 event ===
Confirmed tornadoes – Thursday, April 8, 1954
F#	Location	County / Parish	State	Start Coord.	Time (UTC)	Path length	Width	Damage
F2†	SW of Dawsonville	Dawson	Georgia	34.37°N 84.20°W	18:00–?	5 mi (8.0 km)†	300 yd (270 m)†	$8,000※
F2†	This tornado flattened much timber and destroyed a pair of barns.							
F0	S of Iowa※	Jefferson Davis	Louisiana	30.23°N 92.95°W	21:00–?	1 mi (1.6 km)	10 yd (9.1 m)	$30‡
F0	A brief touchdown occurred over farmland.							
F2	Swartz Creek	Genesee	Michigan	42.95°N 83.83°W	00:40–?	0.5 mi (0.80 km)†	10 yd (9.1 m)†	$25,000
F2	This tornado formed alongside six funnel clouds. It destroyed a garage and a fire station, moving the former's roof 100 yd (300 ft). It also wrecked windows, a pair of barns, a few fire engines, and two automobiles. A few people were injured.							

== See also ==
- List of tornadoes and tornado outbreaks
  - List of North American tornadoes and tornado outbreaks
- Tornadoes of 1954

== Sources ==
- Agee, Ernest M.; Childs, Samuel (June 1, 2014). "Adjustments in Tornado Counts, F-Scale Intensity, and Path Width for Assessing Significant Tornado Destruction". Journal of Applied Meteorology and Climatology. 53 (6). American Meteorological Society: 1494–1505. doi:10.1175/JAMC-D-13-0235.1.
- Brooks, Harold E. (April 2004). "On the Relationship of Tornado Path Length and Width to Intensity". Weather and Forecasting. 19 (2): 310–19. Bibcode:2004WtFor..19..310B. doi:10.1175/1520-0434(2004)019<0310:OTROTP>2.0.CO;2.
- Cook, A. R.; Schaefer, J. T. (August 2008). "The Relation of El Niño–Southern Oscillation (ENSO) to Winter Tornado Outbreaks". Monthly Weather Review. 136 (8): 3121–3137. Bibcode:2008MWRv..136.3121C. doi:10.1175/2007MWR2171.1.
- Edwards, Roger; LaDue, James G.; Ferree, John T.; Scharfenberg, Kevin; Maier, Chris; Coulbourne, William L. (May 1, 2013). "Tornado Intensity Estimation: Past, Present, and Future". Bulletin of the American Meteorological Society. 94 (5). American Meteorological Society: 641–653. doi:10.1175/BAMS-D-11-00006.1.
- Grazulis, Thomas P. (May 1984). Violent Tornado Climatography, 1880–1982. OSTI (Technical report). NUREG. Washington, D.C.: Nuclear Regulatory Commission. OSTI 7099491. CR-3670.
  - — (November 1990). Significant Tornadoes 1880–1989. Vol. 2. St. Johnsbury, Vermont: The Tornado Project of Environmental Films. ISBN 1-879362-02-3.
  - — (July 1993). Significant Tornadoes 1680–1991: A Chronology and Analysis of Events. St. Johnsbury, Vermont: The Tornado Project of Environmental Films. ISBN 1-879362-03-1.
  - — (2001a). The Tornado: Nature's Ultimate Windstorm. Norman: University of Oklahoma Press. ISBN 978-0-8061-3538-0.
  - — (2001b). F5-F6 Tornadoes. St. Johnsbury, Vermont: The Tornado Project of Environmental Films.
- National Weather Service (April 1954). Storm Data Publication (Report). National Centers for Environmental Information. Archived from the original on April 7, 2012 – via Storm Events Database.
- U.S. Weather Bureau (April 1954). "Storm data and unusual weather phenomena". Climatological Data National Summary. 5 (4). Asheville, North Carolina: National Climatic Data Center: 97–100.
