= Aroma Township, Kankakee County, Illinois =

Aroma Township
- Township
- Location in Kankakee County

- Kankakee County's location in Illinois
- Coordinates: 41°04′34″N 87°46′46″W
- Country: United States
- State: Illinois
- County: Kankakee
- Established: May 9, 1853

Government
  - Supervisor: Lloyd Burling

Area
  - Total: 38.00 sq mi (98.4 km^{2})
  - Land: 37.09 sq mi (96.1 km^{2})
  - Water: 0.91 sq mi (2.4 km^{2}) 2.40%
- Elevation: 604 ft (184 m)

Population (2020)
  - Total: 4,912
  - Density: 132.4/sq mi (51.13/km^{2})
- Time zone: UTC-6 (CST)
  - Summer (DST): UTC-5 (CDT)
- ZIP codes: 60901, 60910, 60954, 60964
- FIPS code: 17-091-02245

Aroma Township is one of seventeen townships in Kankakee County, Illinois, USA. As of the 2020 census, its population was 4,912 and it contained 2,209 housing units.

== Geography ==
According to the 2021 census gazetteer files, Aroma Township has a total area of 38.00 square miles (98.42 km^{2}), of which 37.09 square miles (96.06 km^{2}) (or 97.60%) is land and 0.91 square miles (2.36 km^{2}) (or 2.40%) is water.

Aroma township includes the Iroquois Woods Nature Preserve and Strasma Park.

=== Cities, towns, villages ===
- Aroma Park (vast majority)
- Kankakee (east edge)
- Sammons Point (east edge)
- Sun River Terrace (southwest quarter)

=== Adjacent townships ===
- Ganeer Township (northeast)
- St. Anne Township (southeast)
- Papineau Township, Iroquois County (south)
- Chebanse Township, Iroquois County (southwest)
- Kankakee Township (west)
- Otto Township (west)
- Bourbonnais Township (northwest)

=== Cemeteries ===
The township contains these six cemeteries: Aroma Park, B'nai Israel, Bebe Family, Kankakee Memorial Gardens, Flower, and Leggtown.

=== Major highways ===
- Illinois Route 1
- Illinois Route 17
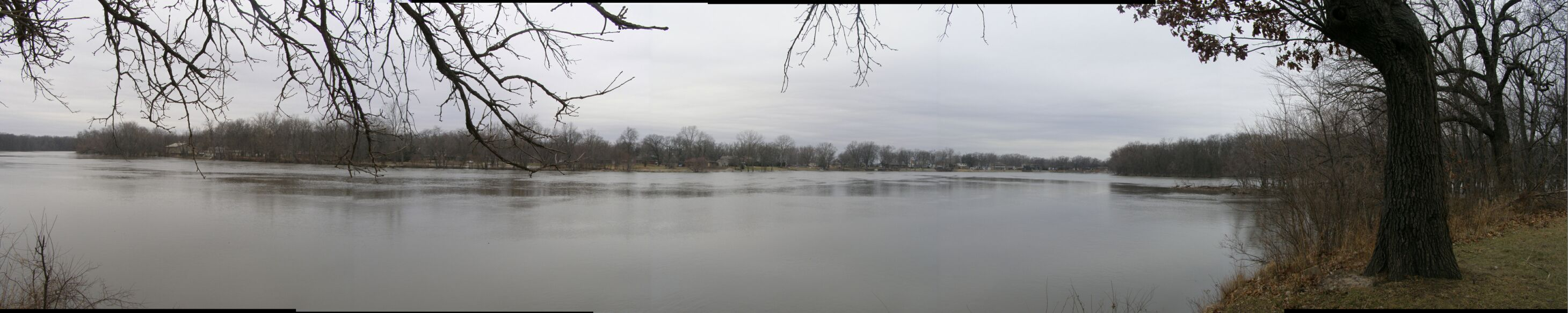
Junction of the Iroquois River (left) and the Kankakee River

== Demographics ==
As of the 2020 census there were 4,912 people, 1,942 households, and 1,319 families residing in the township. The population density was 129.26 inhabitants per square mile (49.91/km^{2}). There were 2,209 housing units at an average density of 58.13 per square mile (22.44/km^{2}). The racial makeup of the township was 73.31% White, 11.85% African American, 0.35% Native American, 0.39% Asian, 0.04% Pacific Islander, 7.13% from other races, and 6.94% from two or more races. Hispanic or Latino of any race were 12.48% of the population.

There were 1,942 households, out of which 28.40% had children under the age of 18 living with them, 57.57% were married couples living together, 6.28% had a female householder with no spouse present, and 32.08% were non-families. 27.00% of all households were made up of individuals, and 12.30% had someone living alone who was 65 years of age or older. The average household size was 2.52 and the average family size was 3.03.

The township's age distribution consisted of 23.3% under the age of 18, 4.7% from 18 to 24, 22.3% from 25 to 44, 29.8% from 45 to 64, and 19.7% who were 65 years of age or older. The median age was 44.3 years. For every 100 females, there were 112.6 males. For every 100 females age 18 and over, there were 102.3 males.

The median income for a household in the township was $61,935, and the median income for a family was $69,408. Males had a median income of $42,117 versus $37,344 for females. The per capita income for the township was $31,413. About 7.2% of families and 13.4% of the population were below the poverty line, including 22.7% of those under age 18 and 10.4% of those age 65 or over.

Historical population
Census	Pop.	Note	%±
2000	5,770		—
2010	5,157		−10.6%
2020	4,912		−4.8%
U.S. Decennial Census

== Government ==
The township is governed by an elected Town Board of a Supervisor and four Trustees. The Township also has an elected Assessor, Clerk, Highway Commissioner and Supervisor. The Township Office is located at 3955 South 3250 East Road, St. Anne, IL 60964.

== Political districts ==
- Illinois's 11th congressional district
- State House District 79
- State Senate District 40

== School districts ==
- Kankakee School District 111
- Momence Community Unit School District 1
