= Wichert, Illinois =

- Unincorporated community
- Location within Illinois Location within the United States
- Coordinates: 41°03′26″N 87°42′15″W
- Country: United States
- State: Illinois
- County: Kankakee
- Elevation: 633 ft (193 m)
- Time zone: UTC-6 (Central (CST))
  - Summer (DST): UTC-5 (CDT)
- Area codes: 815 & 779
- GNIS feature ID: 421125

Wichert is an unincorporated community in St. Anne Township, Kankakee County, Illinois, United States. The community is on County Route 10 and a railway line 2.5 miles (4.0 km) north-northeast of St. Anne.
