= Otto Township, Kankakee County, Illinois =

Otto Township
- Township
- Location in Kankakee County

- Kankakee County's location in Illinois
- Coordinates: 41°02′21″N 87°54′56″W
- Country: United States
- State: Illinois
- County: Kankakee
- Established: December 11, 1855

Area
  - Total: 48.54 sq mi (125.7 km^{2})
  - Land: 48.23 sq mi (124.9 km^{2})
  - Water: 0.31 sq mi (0.80 km^{2}) 0.63%
- Elevation: 636 ft (194 m)

Population (2020)
  - Total: 2,137
  - Density: 44.31/sq mi (17.11/km^{2})
- Time zone: UTC-6 (CST)
  - Summer (DST): UTC-5 (CDT)
- ZIP codes: 60901, 60922, 60941
- FIPS code: 17-091-57017

Otto Township is one of seventeen townships in Kankakee County, Illinois, United States. As of the 2010 census, its population was 2,137 and it contained 885 housing units. It was formed from portions of Aroma and Limestone townships on December 11, 1855 as Carthage Township; its name was changed to Otto Township on March 11, 1857.

== Geography ==
According to the 2021 census gazetteer files, Otto Township has a total area of 48.54 square miles (125.72 km^{2}), of which 48.23 square miles (124.92 km^{2}) (or 99.37%) is land and 0.31 square miles (0.80 km^{2}) (or 0.63%) is water.

=== Cities, towns, villages ===
- Aroma Park (west edge)
- Chebanse (north quarter)
- Irwin
- Kankakee (southwest quarter)
- Sammons Point (vast majority)

=== Unincorporated towns ===
- Otto at 41.047255°N 87.891153°W
- Sugar Island at 41.006422°N 87.82365°W

(This list is based on USGS data and may include former settlements.)

=== Adjacent townships ===
- Kankakee Township (northeast)
- Aroma Township (east)
- Papineau Township, Iroquois County (east)
- Chebanse Township, Iroquois County (south)
- Milks Grove Township, Iroquois County (southwest)
- Pilot Township (west)
- Limestone Township (northwest)

=== Cemeteries ===
The township contains these two cemeteries: Barnett and Saint James.

=== Major highways ===
- Interstate 57
- U.S. Route 45

=== Airports and landing strips ===
- Greater Kankakee Airport

== Demographics ==
As of the 2020 census there were 2,137 people, 881 households, and 598 families residing in the township. The population density was 44.03 inhabitants per square mile (17.00/km^{2}). There were 885 housing units at an average density of 18.23 per square mile (7.04/km^{2}). The racial makeup of the township was 83.95% White, 3.51% African American, 0.33% Native American, 0.28% Asian, 0.00% Pacific Islander, 6.04% from other races, and 5.90% from two or more races. Hispanic or Latino of any race were 9.03% of the population.

There were 881 households, out of which 30.10% had children under the age of 18 living with them, 44.95% were married couples living together, 10.67% had a female householder with no spouse present, and 32.12% were non-families. 28.90% of all households were made up of individuals, and 12.30% had someone living alone who was 65 years of age or older. The average household size was 2.75 and the average family size was 3.30.

The township's age distribution consisted of 19.8% under the age of 18, 14.5% from 18 to 24, 26.1% from 25 to 44, 27.6% from 45 to 64, and 12.0% who were 65 years of age or older. The median age was 34.6 years. For every 100 females, there were 107.9 males. For every 100 females age 18 and over, there were 112.2 males.

The median income for a household in the township was $73,849, and the median income for a family was $83,618. Males had a median income of $47,875 versus $31,700 for females. The per capita income for the township was $29,405. About 7.0% of families and 8.1% of the population were below the poverty line, including 15.0% of those under age 18 and 4.2% of those age 65 or over.

Historical population
Census	Pop.	Note	%±
2000	2,437		—
2010	2,582		5.9%
2020	2,137		−17.2%
U.S. Decennial Census

== Government ==
The township is governed by an elected Town Board of a Supervisor and four Trustees. The Township also has an elected Assessor, Bill Surprenant, a Township Clerk, James White, and a Highway Commissioner, Barry Painter. The Township Supervisor is Douglas Enz. The Township Office is located at 860 East 4000 South Road, Kankakee, IL 60901.

== Political districts ==
- Illinois's 11th congressional district
- State House District 75
- State House District 79
- State Senate District 38
- State Senate District 40

== School districts ==
- Central Community Unit School District 4
- Herscher Community Unit School District 2
- Kankakee School District 111
