= Leesville, Illinois =

- Unincorporated community
- Location within Illinois Location within the United States
- Coordinates: 41°01′29″N 87°37′30″W
- Country: United States
- State: Illinois
- County: Kankakee
- Elevation: 640 ft (200 m)
- Time zone: UTC-6 (Central (CST))
  - Summer (DST): UTC-5 (CDT)
- Area codes: 815 & 779
- GNIS feature ID: 411920

Leesville is an unincorporated community in Pembroke Township, Kankakee County, Illinois, United States. The community is on County Route 53 2.7 miles (4.3 km) south of Hopkins Park.
