= Kankakee Township, Kankakee County, Illinois =

Kankakee Township
- Township
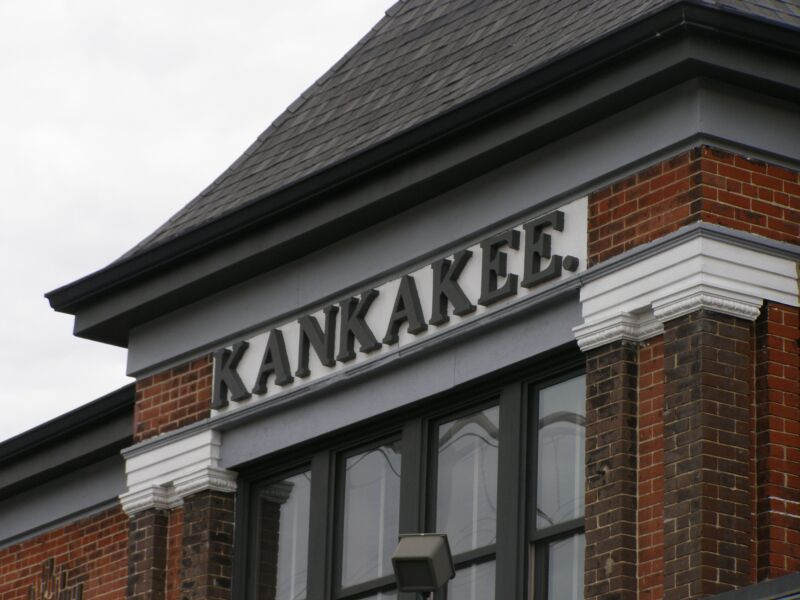

- Location in Kankakee County

- Kankakee County's location in Illinois
- Coordinates: 41°06′28″N 87°51′27″W
- Country: United States
- State: Illinois
- County: Kankakee
- Established: March 12, 1855

Government
  - Supervisor: Larry Enz

Area
  - Total: 18.43 sq mi (47.7 km^{2})
  - Land: 17.95 sq mi (46.5 km^{2})
  - Water: 0.48 sq mi (1.2 km^{2}) 2.60%
- Elevation: 610 ft (186 m)

Population (2020)
  - Total: 24,508
  - Density: 1,365/sq mi (527.2/km^{2})
- Time zone: UTC-6 (CST)
  - Summer (DST): UTC-5 (CDT)
- ZIP codes: 60901
- FIPS code: 17-091-38947

Kankakee Township is one of seventeen townships in Kankakee County, Illinois, United States. As of the 2020 census, its population was 24,508 and it contained 10,914 housing units. This township has the smallest area in the county, but is second largest in population.

== History ==
Kankakee Township was formed from a portion of Bourbonnais Township on March 12, 1855.

== Geography ==
According to the 2021 census gazetteer files, Kankakee Township has a total area of 18.43 square miles (47.73 km^{2}), of which 17.95 square miles (46.49 km^{2}) (or 97.40%) is land and 0.48 square miles (1.24 km^{2}) (or 2.60%) is water.

=== Cities, towns, villages ===
- Kankakee (northeast three-quarters)

=== Unincorporated towns ===
- West Kankakee at 41.118644°N 87.888099°W

(This list is based on USGS data and may include former settlements.)

=== Adjacent townships ===
- Bourbonnais Township (north)
- Aroma Township (east)
- Ganeer Township (east)
- Otto Township (southwest)
- Limestone Township (west)

=== Cemeteries ===
The township contains these four cemeteries: Mound Grove, Mount Calvary, Old State Hospital and State Hospital.

=== Major highways ===
- Interstate 57
- U.S. Route 45
- Illinois Route 17
- Illinois Route 50

=== Airports and landing strips ===
- Benoit Airport
- Kankakee Valley Airport (north quarter)
- Riverside Medical Center Heliport
- Saint Marys Hospital Heliport

=== Rivers ===
- Iroquois River
- Kankakee River

== Demographics ==
As of the 2020 census there were 24,508 people, 9,772 households, and 5,764 families residing in the township. The population density was 1,329.57 inhabitants per square mile (513.35/km^{2}). There were 10,914 housing units at an average density of 592.09 per square mile (228.61/km^{2}). The racial makeup of the township was 40.28% White, 37.10% African American, 0.73% Native American, 0.45% Asian, 0.04% Pacific Islander, 12.85% from other races, and 8.55% from two or more races. Hispanic or Latino of any race were 21.52% of the population.

There were 9,772 households, out of which 31.30% had children under the age of 18 living with them, 34.07% were married couples living together, 17.66% had a female householder with no spouse present, and 41.02% were non-families. 35.50% of all households were made up of individuals, and 12.80% had someone living alone who was 65 years of age or older. The average household size was 2.51 and the average family size was 3.31.

The township's age distribution consisted of 25.6% under the age of 18, 8.7% from 18 to 24, 27.5% from 25 to 44, 23.9% from 45 to 64, and 14.4% who were 65 years of age or older. The median age was 36.3 years. For every 100 females, there were 91.3 males. For every 100 females age 18 and over, there were 92.9 males.

The median income for a household in the township was $40,425, and the median income for a family was $52,023. Males had a median income of $37,449 versus $24,367 for females. The per capita income for the township was $21,227. About 19.5% of families and 25.0% of the population were below the poverty line, including 33.7% of those under age 18 and 22.9% of those age 65 or over.

Historical population
Census	Pop.	Note	%±
2000	28,152		—
2010	27,558		−2.1%
2020	24,508		−11.1%
U.S. Decennial Census

== Government ==
The township is governed by an elected Town Board of a Supervisor and four Trustees. The Township also has an elected Assessor, Clerk, Highway Commissioner and Supervisor. The Township Office is located at 187 South Schuyler Avenue, Suite 410, Kankakee, IL 60901.

== Political districts ==
- Illinois's 11th congressional district
- State House District 79
- State Senate District 40

== School districts ==
- Herscher Community Unit School District 2
- Kankakee School District 111
