= Lehigh, Illinois =

- Unincorporated community
- Location within Illinois Location within the United States
- Coordinates: 41°06′37″N 88°01′05″W
- Country: United States
- State: Illinois
- County: Kankakee
- Elevation: 650 ft (200 m)
- Time zone: UTC-6 (Central (CST))
  - Summer (DST): UTC-5 (CDT)
- Area codes: 815 & 779
- GNIS feature ID: 422906

Lehigh is an unincorporated community in Limestone Township, Kankakee County, Illinois, United States. The community is on County Route 28 and a railway line 3 miles (4.8 km) west-southwest of Limestone.
