= Whitaker, Illinois =

- Unincorporated community
- Location within Illinois Location within the United States
- Coordinates: 41°15′05″N 87°43′40″W
- Country: United States
- State: Illinois
- County: Kankakee
- Elevation: 696 ft (212 m)
- Time zone: UTC-6 (Central (CST))
  - Summer (DST): UTC-5 (CDT)
- Area codes: 815 & 779
- GNIS feature ID: 421013

Whitaker is an unincorporated community in Sumner Township, Kankakee County, Illinois, United States. The community is on County Route 9 5.4 miles (8.7 km) east of Manteno.
