= Pembroke Township =

Pembroke Township may refer to:

== Canada ==
- Pembroke Township, Ontario, now part of Laurentian Valley

== Ireland ==
- Pembroke, Dublin, a former township now within the city of Dublin

== United States ==
- Pembroke Township, Kankakee County, Illinois
- Pembroke Township, Robeson County, North Carolina, in Robeson County, North Carolina
