= Sugar Island, Illinois =

- Unincorporated community
- Location within Illinois Location within the United States
- Coordinates: 41°00′23″N 87°49′25″W
- Country: United States
- State: Illinois
- County: Kankakee
- Township: Otto
- Elevation: 620 ft (190 m)

Population (2000)
  - Total: <100
- Time zone: UTC-6 (CST)
  - Summer (DST): UTC-5 (CDT)
- GNIS ID: 423218

Sugar Island is an unincorporated community in Kankakee County, Illinois, United States. Located on the Iroquois River, the soil around this community is very fertile. The town is set up in a rectangular grid. Although Sugar Island is located in Kankakee County, it is on the border of Iroquois County.

Sugar Island was the site of one of the earliest non-native settlements on the Iroquois river, first settled in 1843 and named Alymer. Henry Ostrander built a mill at Sugar Island in 1848, and had Alymer platted as a village in 1850. A new plat was filed in 1855 now naming it "Sugar Island". However, the new railroad town of Chebanse, four miles to the west, was drawing away residents. Nearly all the town plat of Sugar Island had been vacated by the early 1900s.

An iron bridge was built across the Iroquois River at Sugar Island in 1902.
