= Sun River Terrace, Illinois =

- Village
- Location of Sun River Terrace in Kankakee County, Illinois

- Location of Illinois in the United States
- Coordinates: 41°07′30″N 87°44′02″W
- Country: United States
- State: Illinois
- County: Kankakee
- Townships: Ganeer, Aroma

Area
  - Total: 0.58 sq mi (1.49 km^{2})
  - Land: 0.58 sq mi (1.49 km^{2})
  - Water: 0 sq mi (0.00 km^{2})
- Elevation: 620 ft (190 m)

Population (2020)
  - Total: 455
  - Density: 793.5/sq mi (306.38/km^{2})
- Time zone: UTC-6 (CST)
  - Summer (DST): UTC-5 (CDT)
- ZIP code: 60964 (St. Anne)
- Area codes: 815 & 779
- FIPS code: 17-73943
- GNIS feature ID: 2399933
- Wikimedia Commons: Sun River Terrace, Illinois
- Website: https://sunriverterrace.com/

Sun River Terrace is a village in Kankakee County, Illinois, United States. The population was 455 at the 2020 census. It is included in the Kankakee-Bradley, Illinois Metropolitan Statistical Area.

== Geography ==
Sun River Terrace is located in eastern Kankakee County on the southeast side of the Kankakee River, with Illinois Route 17 running along the southern boundary of the village. Kankakee, the county seat, is 6 miles (10 km) to the west, and Momence is the same distance to the northeast.

According to the 2021 census gazetteer files, Sun River Terrace has a total area of 0.57 square miles (1.48 km^{2}), of which 0.57 square miles (1.48 km^{2}) (or 99.83%) is land and 0.00 square miles (0.00 km^{2}) (or 0.17%) is water.

== Demographics ==
Historical population
| Census | Pop. | Note | %± |
|---|---|---|---|
| 1990 | 532 | | — |
| 2000 | 383 | | −28.0% |
| 2010 | 528 | | 37.9% |
| 2020 | 455 | | −13.8% |
U.S. Decennial Census; 2010 2020

As of the 2020 census there were 455 people, 140 households, and 88 families residing in the village. The population density was 792.68 inhabitants per square mile (306.06/km^{2}). There were 207 housing units at an average density of 360.63 per square mile (139.24/km^{2}). The racial makeup of the village was 12.97% White, 73.41% African American, 0.44% Native American, 0.22% Asian, 0.00% Pacific Islander, 3.30% from other races, and 9.67% from two or more races. Hispanic or Latino of any race were 9.01% of the population.

There were 140 households, out of which 43.6% had children under the age of 18 living with them, 14.29% were married couples living together, 42.86% had a female householder with no husband present, and 37.14% were non-families. 30.00% of all households were made up of individuals, and 13.57% had someone living alone who was 65 years of age or older. The average household size was 4.14 and the average family size was 3.46.

The village's age distribution consisted of 33.5% under the age of 18, 4.1% from 18 to 24, 30.4% from 25 to 44, 15.9% from 45 to 64, and 16.1% who were 65 years of age or older. The median age was 33.7 years. For every 100 females, there were 92.8 males. For every 100 females age 18 and over, there were 79.9 males.

The median income for a household in the village was $46,346, and the median income for a family was $45,833. Males had a median income of $42,917 versus $38,594 for females. The per capita income for the village was $16,798. About 15.9% of families and 23.8% of the population were below the poverty line, including 21.2% of those under age 18 and 3.8% of those age 65 or over.

Sun River Terrace village, Illinois – Racial and ethnic composition Note: the US Census treats Hispanic/Latino as an ethnic category. This table excludes Latinos from the racial categories and assigns them to a separate category. Hispanics/Latinos may be of any race.
| Race / Ethnicity (NH = Non-Hispanic) | Pop 2000 | Pop 2010 | Pop 2020 | % 2000 | % 2010 | % 2020 |
|---|---|---|---|---|---|---|
| White alone (NH) | 31 | 37 | 49 | 8.09% | 7.01% | 10.77% |
| Black or African American alone (NH) | 338 | 456 | 334 | 88.25% | 86.36% | 73.41% |
| Native American or Alaska Native alone (NH) | 0 | 1 | 0 | 0.00% | 0.19% | 0.00% |
| Asian alone (NH) | 0 | 0 | 1 | 0.00% | 0.00% | 0.22% |
| Pacific Islander alone (NH) | 0 | 0 | 0 | 0.00% | 0.00% | 0.00% |
| Other race alone (NH) | 3 | 1 | 0 | 0.78% | 0.19% | 0.00% |
| Mixed race or Multiracial (NH) | 3 | 7 | 30 | 0.78% | 1.33% | 6.59% |
| Hispanic or Latino (any race) | 8 | 26 | 41 | 2.09% | 4.92% | 9.01% |
| Total | 383 | 528 | 455 | 100.00% | 100.00% | 100.00% |

== Transportation ==
SHOW Bus provides bus service between Sun River Terrace, Momence and Kankakee on weekdays.
