= Manteno Township, Kankakee County, Illinois =

Manteno Township
- Township
- Location in Kankakee County

- Kankakee County's location in Illinois
- Coordinates: 41°15′00″N 87°50′18″W
- Country: United States
- State: Illinois
- County: Kankakee
- Established: March 12, 1855

Government
  - Supervisor: Alan Williams

Area
  - Total: 36.68 sq mi (95.0 km^{2})
  - Land: 36.58 sq mi (94.7 km^{2})
  - Water: 0.10 sq mi (0.26 km^{2}) 0.27%
- Elevation: 690 ft (210 m)

Population (2020)
  - Total: 11,255
  - Density: 307.7/sq mi (118.8/km^{2})
- Time zone: UTC-6 (CST)
  - Summer (DST): UTC-5 (CDT)
- ZIP codes: 60468, 60914, 60950
- FIPS code: 17-091-46513

Manteno Township is one of seventeen townships in Kankakee County, Illinois, USA. As of the 2020 census, its population was 11,255 and it contained 4,744 housing units. It was formed from Rockville Township on March 12, 1855.

== Geography ==
According to the 2021 census gazetteer files, Manteno Township has a total area of 36.68 square miles (95.00 km^{2}), of which 36.58 square miles (94.74 km^{2}) (or 99.73%) is land and 0.10 square miles (0.26 km^{2}) (or 0.27%) is water.

=== Cities, towns, villages ===
- Bourbonnais (north quarter)
- Bradley (north edge)
- Manteno

=== Adjacent townships ===
- Peotone Township, Will County (north)
- Will Township, Will County (northeast)
- Sumner Township (east)
- Ganeer Township (southeast)
- Bourbonnais Township (south)
- Rockville Township (west)

=== Cemeteries ===
The township contains these three cemeteries: Elmwood, Saint Joseph and State Hospital.

=== Major highways ===
- Interstate 57
- U.S. Route 45
- Illinois Route 50

=== Airports and landing strips ===
- Phipps Airport
- Spangler Airport

=== Landmarks ===
- Heritage Park

== Demographics ==
As of the 2020 census there were 11,255 people, 4,340 households, and 2,701 families residing in the township. The population density was 306.86 inhabitants per square mile (118.48/km^{2}). There were 4,744 housing units at an average density of 129.34 per square mile (49.94/km^{2}). The racial makeup of the township was 88.64% White, 2.27% African American, 0.15% Native American, 0.73% Asian, 0.04% Pacific Islander, 2.00% from other races, and 6.18% from two or more races. Hispanic or Latino of any race were 6.35% of the population.

There were 4,340 households, out of which 27.10% had children under the age of 18 living with them, 49.06% were married couples living together, 8.04% had a female householder with no spouse present, and 37.76% were non-families. 32.20% of all households were made up of individuals, and 15.00% had someone living alone who was 65 years of age or older. The average household size was 2.39 and the average family size was 3.04.

The township's age distribution consisted of 22.3% under the age of 18, 8.1% from 18 to 24, 20.2% from 25 to 44, 26.2% from 45 to 64, and 23.1% who were 65 years of age or older. The median age was 44.0 years. For every 100 females, there were 113.6 males. For every 100 females age 18 and over, there were 115.5 males.

The median income for a household in the township was $65,902, and the median income for a family was $91,369. Males had a median income of $50,690 versus $33,770 for females. The per capita income for the township was $33,175. About 3.7% of families and 5.3% of the population were below the poverty line, including 4.6% of those under age 18 and 1.7% of those age 65 or over.

Historical population
Census	Pop.	Note	%±
2000	7,847		—
2010	11,185		42.5%
2020	11,255		0.6%
U.S. Decennial Census

== Government ==
The township is governed by an elected Town Board of a Supervisor and four Trustees. The Township also has an elected Assessor, Clerk, Highway Commissioner and Supervisor. The Township Office is located at 452 Water Tower South, Manteno, IL 60950.

== Political districts ==
- Illinois's 2nd congressional district
- State House District 34
- State Senate District 17

== School districts ==
- Manteno Community Unit School District 5
