= Greenwich, Illinois =

- Unincorporated community
- Location within Illinois Location within the United States
- Coordinates: 41°07′06″N 87°55′37″W
- Country: United States
- State: Illinois
- County: Kankakee
- Elevation: 623 ft (190 m)
- Time zone: UTC-6 (Central (CST))
  - Summer (DST): UTC-5 (CDT)
- Area codes: 815 & 779
- GNIS feature ID: 409450

Greenwich is an unincorporated community in Limestone Township, Kankakee County, Illinois, United States. The community is on Illinois Route 17 3.40 miles (5.47 km) west of downtown Kankakee.
