= St. Anne Community High School =

Location
- 650 W Guertin St; Saint Anne, Illinois 60964; United States
- Coordinates: 41.0202°N 87.7224°W

Information
- School district: St Anne Community School District #302
- NCES District ID: 1737140
- Principal: Ramie Kolitwenzew
- Faculty: 18.96 (on an FTE basis)
- Grades: 9–12
- Enrollment: 206 (2023–24)
- Student to teacher ratio: 10.86
- Area: East Illinois
- Campus type: rural
- Color
- Athletics conference: River Valley Conference
- Mascot: Cardinals
- Website: www.sachs302.org

St. Anne Community High School (District #302) is a public high school in St. Anne Township, Kankakee County, Illinois. It serves rural communities in both Kankakee and Iroquois Counties.
