= Arch Ward =

American sportswriter (1896–1955)

- Born: December 27, 1896; Irwin, Illinois, U.S.
- Died: July 9, 1955 (aged 58); Chicago, Illinois, U.S.
- Burial place: All Saints Cemetery
- Education: Columbia College, Notre Dame
- Occupation: Sports editor
- Employer: Chicago Tribune
- Spouse: Helen
- Children: 2

Archie Burdette Ward (December 27, 1896 – July 9, 1955) was an American journalist who served as sports editor for the Chicago Tribune. He was the creator of the Major League Baseball All-Star Game, the Golden Gloves amateur boxing tournament and the World Professional Basketball Tournament.

== Biography ==
Ward was born in 1896 in Irwin, Illinois, and attended Columbia Academy and Columbia College (now Loras College) in Dubuque, Iowa. He worked for the Telegraph Herald in Dubuque in 1919. Ward completed college at the University of Notre Dame, where he worked as publicity director under Knute Rockne in 1919 and 1920, before graduating in 1921. Ward then worked for the Star in Rockford, Illinois, during 1921–1925. He joined the Chicago Tribune in 1925, and became sports editor in 1930.

Ward is credited with conceiving of an All-Star Game in major-league-baseball, first contested in 1933. He also created the Golden Gloves, an amateur boxing tournament, and the College All-Star Football Classic, an annual game between professional and college players. The most valuable player at baseball's All-Star Game, first selected in 1962, was given the "Arch Ward Memorial Award" until the award was renamed in 1970 (since 2002, it has been formally named in honor of Ted Williams).

In 1941, Ward was offered the role of Commissioner of the National Football League (NFL), but turned it down. He later started the rival All-America Football Conference (AAFC). He was quoted as being an "idealist", one that felt the NFL was a "cheap-john minor league outfit" which needed a major pro league like the AAFC to force the NFL to pay their players better. (Note: Two original AAFC teams, the Cleveland Browns and San Francisco 49ers, remain active in the NFL.) Ward helped set up the first meeting of the organization that would become the AAFC on June 4, 1944, with word getting out about the league in late August of that year before a formal announcement on September 2, 1944. The league lasted four seasons, with the sudden heart attack suffered by Benjamin F. Lindheimer in late 1949 (who owned three of the eight AAFC teams) being a key point of the demise of the league, with various members involved with the league saying that Ward turned the NFL into a major league in spite of itself.

Ward published several collections of light content ("notes, verses and comments") from the Chicago Tribune entitled In The Wake Of The News Book and edited an anthology called The Greatest Sports Stories From Chicago Tribune. He also was the author of three sports-related books:

- Frank Leahy and the Fighting Irish (1944)
- The Green Bay Packers (1946)
- The New Chicago White Sox (1951)

Ward was involved in conservative political causes and as well as the hierarchy of the Catholic Church. Described as affable and mild mannered, he was considered a dynamo with powerful contacts in American politics, church matters, and journalism.

== Personal life and death ==
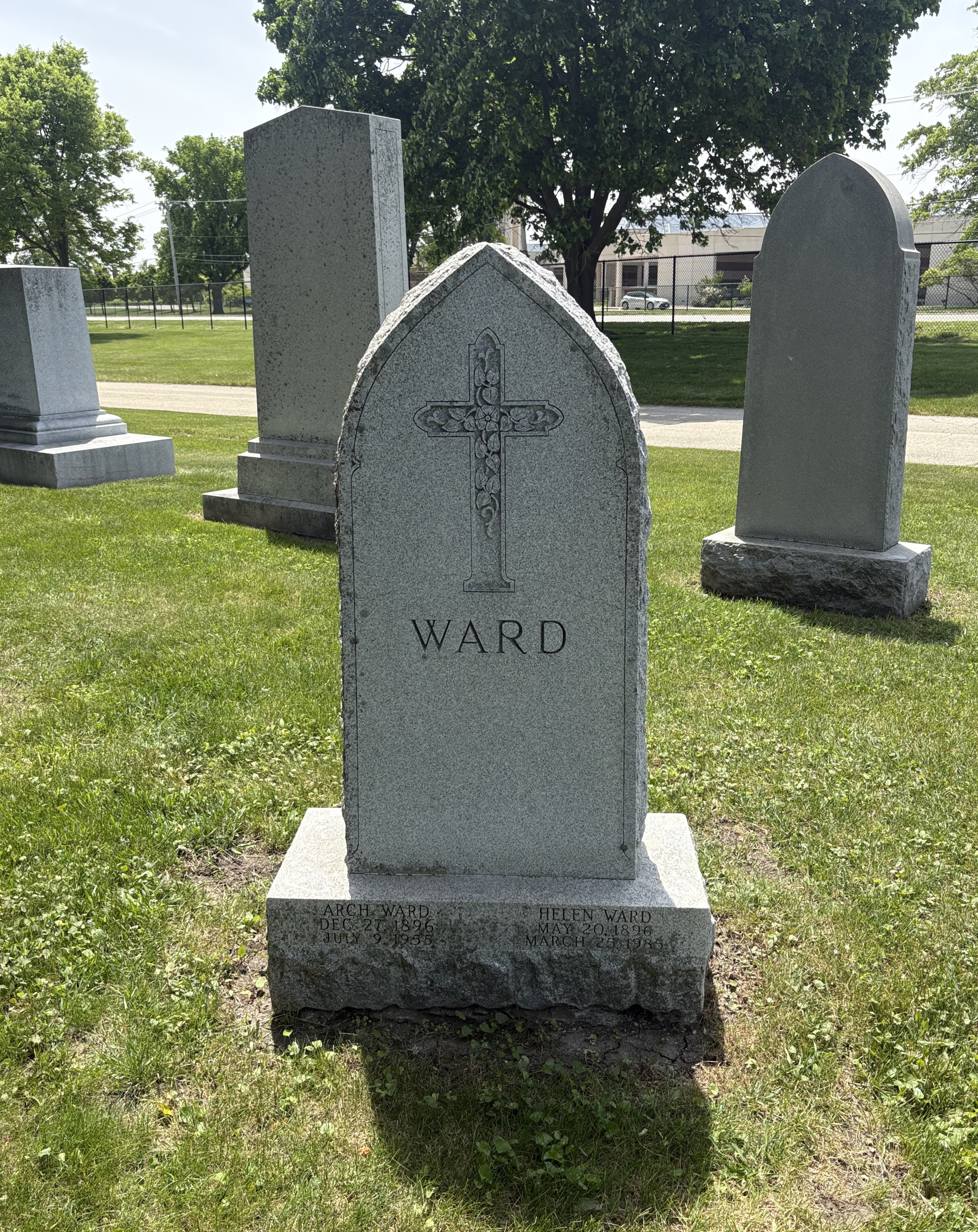
Ward's grave at All Saints Cemetery

Ward died in his sleep in 1955 at the age of 58, at his home on Lake Shore Drive in Chicago; his death was attributed to a heart attack. He was survived by his wife, Helen, and a son; a daughter had predeceased him in 1940. His funeral took place the same day as the 1955 MLB All-Star Game. He was buried at All Saints Cemetery in Des Plaines.
