= Ganeer Township, Kankakee County, Illinois =

Ganeer Township
- Township
- Location in Kankakee County

- Kankakee County's location in Illinois
- Coordinates: 41°09′19″N 87°42′41″W
- Country: United States
- State: Illinois
- County: Kankakee
- Established: May 9, 1853

Government
  - Supervisor: Michael Hemphil

Area
  - Total: 40.25 sq mi (104.2 km^{2})
  - Land: 39.92 sq mi (103.4 km^{2})
  - Water: 0.34 sq mi (0.88 km^{2}) 0.83%
- Elevation: 614 ft (187 m)

Population (2020)
  - Total: 3,148
  - Density: 78.86/sq mi (30.45/km^{2})
- Time zone: UTC-6 (CST)
  - Summer (DST): UTC-5 (CDT)
- ZIP codes: 60901, 60914, 60940, 60954, 60964
- FIPS code: 17-091-28456

Ganeer Township is one of seventeen townships in Kankakee County, Illinois, USA. As of the 2020 census, its population was 3,148 and it contained 1,383 housing units.

== History ==
Ganeer Township came into being on February 15, 1859. The township was excised from land in Momence Township.

== Geography ==
According to the 2021 census gazetteer files, Ganeer Township has a total area of 40.25 square miles (104.25 km^{2}), of which 39.92 square miles (103.39 km^{2}) (or 99.17%) is land and 0.34 square miles (0.88 km^{2}) (or 0.83%) is water.

=== Cities, towns, villages ===
- Momence (partial)
- Sun River Terrace (northeast three-quarters)

=== Unincorporated towns ===
- Eldridge at 41.159478°N 87.720038°W
- Koster at 41.0917°N 87.685037°W
- Saint George at 41.192533°N 87.775596°W

(This list is based on USGS data and may include former settlements.)

=== Adjacent townships ===
- Sumner Township (north)
- Yellowhead Township (northeast)
- Momence Township (east)
- Pembroke Township (southeast)
- St. Anne Township (south)
- Aroma Township (southwest)
- Bourbonnais Township (west)
- Kankakee Township (west)
- Manteno Township (northwest)

=== Cemeteries ===
The township contains these four cemeteries: Momence, Mount Airy, Saint George and Saint Patricks.

=== Major highways ===
- Illinois Route 1
- Illinois Route 17
- Illinois Route 114

=== Airports and landing strips ===
- Saint George Airport

== Demographics ==
As of the 2020 census there were 3,148 people, 1,009 households, and 681 families residing in the township. The population density was 78.20 inhabitants per square mile (30.19/km^{2}). There were 1,383 housing units at an average density of 34.36 per square mile (13.27/km^{2}). The racial makeup of the township was 67.15% White, 14.29% African American, 0.64% Native American, 0.60% Asian, 0.03% Pacific Islander, 8.01% from other races, and 9.28% from two or more races. Hispanic or Latino of any race were 15.44% of the population.

There were 1,009 households, out of which 33.40% had children under the age of 18 living with them, 45.39% were married couples living together, 9.02% had a female householder with no spouse present, and 32.51% were non-families. 30.10% of all households were made up of individuals, and 18.50% had someone living alone who was 65 years of age or older. The average household size was 3.00 and the average family size was 3.58.

The township's age distribution consisted of 28.2% under the age of 18, 9.9% from 18 to 24, 23.9% from 25 to 44, 23% from 45 to 64, and 15.0% who were 65 years of age or older. The median age was 33.9 years. For every 100 females, there were 113.1 males. For every 100 females age 18 and over, there were 116.4 males.

The median income for a household in the township was $65,764, and the median income for a family was $74,698. Males had a median income of $47,449 versus $23,750 for females. The per capita income for the township was $25,632. About 4.7% of families and 11.6% of the population were below the poverty line, including 14.9% of those under age 18 and 6.6% of those age 65 or over.

Historical population
Census	Pop.	Note	%±
2000	3,312		—
2010	3,215		−2.9%
2020	3,148		−2.1%
U.S. Decennial Census

== Government ==
The township is governed by an elected Town Board of a Supervisor and four Trustees. The Township also has an elected Assessor, Clerk, Highway Commissioner and Supervisor. The Township Office is located at 120 West Washington, Momence, IL 60954.

== Political districts ==
- Illinois's 11th congressional district
- State House District 79
- State Senate District 40

== School districts ==
- Manteno Community Unit School District 5
- Momence Community Unit School District 1
- Grant Park Community Unit School District 6
- St George Community consolidated School District 258
