= Indian Oaks, Illinois =

- Unincorporated community
- Location within Illinois Location within the United States
- Coordinates: 41°11′30″N 87°51′05″W
- Country: United States
- State: Illinois
- County: Kankakee
- Township: Bourbonnais
- Elevation: 689 ft (210 m)
- Time zone: UTC-6 (Central (CST))
  - Summer (DST): UTC-5 (CDT)
- Area codes: 815 & 779
- GNIS feature ID: 422837

Indian Oaks is an unincorporated community in Kankakee County, in the U.S. state of Illinois.

== History ==
Variant names were "La Prairie" and "Tucker". A post office called Tucker was established in 1875, and remained in operation until 1909. The "Tucker" name was after J. F. Tucker, a railroad official.
