= Pembroke Township, Kankakee County, Illinois =

Pembroke Township
- Township
- Location in Kankakee County

- Kankakee County's location in Illinois
- Coordinates: 41°03′49″N 87°35′37″W
- Country: United States
- State: Illinois
- County: Kankakee
- Established: February 17, 1877

Government
  - Township Supervisor: Sam Payton

Area
  - Total: 52.34 sq mi (135.6 km^{2})
  - Land: 52.34 sq mi (135.6 km^{2})
  - Water: 0 sq mi (0 km^{2}) 0%
- Elevation: 663 ft (202 m)

Population (2020)
  - Total: 1,843
  - Density: 35.21/sq mi (13.60/km^{2})
- Time zone: UTC-6 (CST)
  - Summer (DST): UTC-5 (CDT)
- ZIP codes: 60958
- FIPS code: 17-091-58538

Pembroke Township is one of seventeen townships in Kankakee County, Illinois, USA. As of the 2020 census, its population was 1,843 and it contained 936 housing units. Pembroke Township was formed from parts of Momence township on February 17, 1877. From its beginning through today, Pembroke Township was a site of community for Black farmers.

== Geography ==
According to the 2021 census gazetteer files, Pembroke Township has a total area of 52.34 square miles (135.56 km^{2}), all land.

=== Cities, towns, villages ===
- Hopkins Park

=== Unincorporated towns ===
- Doney at 41.0667°N 87.625035°W
- Leesville at 41.024755°N 87.625034°W
- Saint Anne Woods at 41.037533°N 87.625034°W
- Tallmadge at 41.111422°N 87.625036°W

(This list is based on USGS data and may include former settlements.)

=== Adjacent townships ===
- Momence Township (north)
- Lake Township, Newton County, Indiana (northeast)
- McClellan Township, Newton County, Indiana (east)
- Beaverville Township, Iroquois County (south)
- St. Anne Township (west)
- Ganeer Township (northwest)

=== Cemeteries ===
The township contains the Guiding Star Memorial Cemetery.

== Demographics ==
Historical population
Census	Pop.	Note	%±
2000	2,786		—
2010	2,140		−23.2%
2020	1,843		−13.9%
U.S. Decennial Census

As of the 2020 census there were 1,843 people, 679 households, and 395 families residing in the township. The population density was 35.21 inhabitants per square mile (13.59/km^{2}). There were 936 housing units at an average density of 17.88 per square mile (6.90/km^{2}). The racial makeup of the township was 12.48% White, 73.47% African American, 0.16% Native American, 0.05% Asian, 0.00% Pacific Islander, 7.81% from other races, and 6.02% from two or more races. Hispanic or Latino of any race were 13.35% of the population.

There were 679 households, out of which 18.00% had children under the age of 18 living with them, 32.84% were married couples living together, 19.29% had a female householder with no spouse present, and 41.83% were non-families. 36.20% of all households were made up of individuals, and 16.90% had someone living alone who was 65 years of age or older. The average household size was 2.25 and the average family size was 2.99.

The township's age distribution consisted of 17.8% under the age of 18, 6.0% from 18 to 24, 22.6% from 25 to 44, 26.6% from 45 to 64, and 27.1% who were 65 years of age or older. The median age was 51.0 years. For every 100 females, there were 106.1 males. For every 100 females age 18 and over, there were 101.1 males.

The median income for a household in the township was $33,342, and the median income for a family was $41,958. Males had a median income of $41,985 versus $25,469 for females. The per capita income for the township was $20,232. About 7.8% of families and 24.3% of the population were below the poverty line, including 48.9% of those under age 18 and 19.3% of those age 65 or over.

== Economy ==
As of November 11, 2009, according to a CBS newspaper article, due to misappropriation of funds, the Federal Government cut funding to the tiny village of Hopkins Park which fired the entire police force. Two of three elementary schools were closed. Currently, the County Sheriff provides very limited patrols. Almost half the working age adults are out of work. Pembroke was once home to a Nestle Corporation factory where more than 100 people worked.

== Government ==
The township is governed by an elected Town Board of a Supervisor and four Trustees. The Township also has an elected Assessor, Clerk, Highway Commissioner and Supervisor. The Township Office is located at 4053 South Main Street, PO Box A, Hopkins Park, IL 60944.

== Political districts ==
- Illinois's 2nd Congressional District
- State House District 79
- State Senate District 40

== School districts ==
- Pembroke Community Consolidated School District #259
- St. Anne Community Consolidated School District 256
- St. Anne Community High School District 302

== Black Farming Community ==
Pembroke is a historically Black farming community, at times one of the largest concentrations of Black farmers north of the Mason-Dixon line. The first Black residents of Pembroke arrived in the 1860s: the Tetter family led by patriarch Joseph ‘Pap’ Tetter came from North Carolina. They settled on 42 acres of land which was either bought or acquired using adverse possession laws and established Hopkins Park. Many sources repeat the story that Hopkins Park/Pembroke was a stop along the Underground Railroad. The Tetters were the first of a long tradition of Black farmers in Pembroke; people who had been forced to farm as slaves and sharecroppers could now cultivate their own small plots of land. In the late 1800s and early 1900s, some parts of life in Pembroke were racially segregated, but many Black and white farmers worked together, likely more so than in surrounding parts of Kankakee County.

Unlike many surrounding areas with rich soil, the soil in Pembroke is sandy and lower quality. This can present challenges for growing food, but it also allowed many Black families to buy land in an area that became mostly ignored by white farmers. According to the Chicago Field Museum, "soil seen as poor by outsiders is an asset in Pembroke," requiring farmers to be creative and often collaborate. Some local farmers sold agricultural and livestock products for profit locally as well as to Chicago and other midwestern cities. Others were and continue to be homesteaders who grew food for themselves. Large groups of Black farmers came to Pembroke during the Great Migration (from the South) and an even larger group moved to the area during the Great Depression (from Chicago). Pembroke became almost entirely Black by the time WWII ended. According to the Black Oaks Center, a local Black-run farm, “Pembroke was the 3rd largest hemp producer in the nation” during WWII.

Although the area struggles with high poverty rates and a decreasing population size, the tradition of Black farmers continues in the area today with places like the Black Oaks Center and Iyabo Farms.
