= Altorf, Illinois =

- Unincorporated community
- Location within Illinois Location within the United States
- Coordinates: 41°11′25″N 87°57′44″W
- Country: United States
- State: Illinois
- County: Kankakee
- Township: Bourbonnais
- Named after: Altdorf, Switzerland
- Elevation: 600 ft (180 m)
- Time zone: UTC-6 (Central (CST))
  - Summer (DST): UTC-5 (CDT)
- Area codes: 815 & 779
- GNIS feature ID: 403473

Altorf is an unincorporated community in Kankakee County, in the U.S. state of Illinois.

== History ==
Altorf was laid out in 1858, taking its name after Altdorf, in Switzerland. A post office was established at Altorf in 1886, and remained in operation until 1887.
