= Bourbonnais Township, Kankakee County, Illinois =

Bourbonnais Township
- Township
- Location in Kankakee County

- Kankakee County's location in Illinois
- Coordinates: 41°10′29″N 87°51′37″W
- Country: United States
- State: Illinois
- County: Kankakee
- Established: May 9, 1853

Government
  - Supervisor: Jim Byrne (R-Bradley)

Area
  - Total: 42.61 sq mi (110.4 km^{2})
  - Land: 42.24 sq mi (109.4 km^{2})
  - Water: 0.37 sq mi (0.96 km^{2}) 0.88%
- Elevation: 699 ft (213 m)

Population (2020)
  - Total: 39,210
  - Density: 928.3/sq mi (358.4/km^{2})
- Time zone: UTC-6 (CST)
  - Summer (DST): UTC-5 (CDT)
- ZIP codes: 60901, 60914, 60915, 60950
- FIPS code: 17-091-07484
- Website: www.bourbonnaistownship.com

Bourbonnais Township (/ˌbʊərboʊˈneɪ, bɜːrˈboʊnɪs/ BOOR-boh-NAY, bur-BOH-niss) is one of seventeen townships in Kankakee County, Illinois, USA. As of the 2020 census, its population was 39,210 and it contained 15,529 housing units.

Bourbonnais is the home of Olivet Nazarene University, a private liberal arts Christian college affiliated with the Church of the Nazarene. Bourbonnais and Olivet Nazarene University were the summer home of the Chicago Bears, who held their summer training camp at Olivet.

== History ==
Bourbonnais Township was formerly a township of Will County until Kankakee County was created in 1853.

== Geography ==
According to the 2021 census gazetteer files, Bourbonnais Township has a total area of 42.61 square miles (110.36 km^{2}), of which 42.24 square miles (109.40 km^{2}) (or 99.12%) is land and 0.37 square miles (0.96 km^{2}) (or 0.88%) is water.

=== Cities, towns, villages ===
- Bourbonnais (east three-quarters)
- Bradley (vast majority)
- Kankakee (north edge)

=== Unincorporated towns ===
- Altorf at 41.19031°N 87.962269°W
- Indian Oaks at 41.191699°N 87.851432°W

(This list is based on USGS data and may include former settlements.)

=== Adjacent townships ===
- Manteno Township (north)
- Sumner Township (northeast)
- Ganeer Township (east)
- Aroma Township (southeast)
- Kankakee Township (south)
- Limestone Township (southwest)
- Rockville Township (northwest)

=== Cemeteries ===
The township contains these three cemeteries: Maternity BVM, Smith, and All Saints'.

=== Major highways ===
- Interstate 57
- U.S. Route 45
- Illinois Route 50

=== Airports and landing strips ===
- Karlock Airport

=== Landmarks ===
- Kankakee River State Park

== Demographics ==
As of the 2020 census there were 39,210 people, 13,778 households, and 9,409 families residing in the township. The population density was 920.18 inhabitants per square mile (355.28/km^{2}). There were 15,529 housing units at an average density of 364.44 per square mile (140.71/km^{2}). The racial makeup of the township was 77.96% White, 9.03% African American, 0.30% Native American, 2.01% Asian, 0.01% Pacific Islander, 3.34% from other races, and 7.35% from two or more races. Hispanic or Latino of any race were 8.66% of the population.

There were 13,778 households, out of which 31.00% had children under the age of 18 living with them, 51.55% were married couples living together, 11.95% had a female householder with no spouse present, and 31.71% were non-families. 26.30% of all households were made up of individuals, and 10.80% had someone living alone who was 65 years of age or older. The average household size was 2.70 and the average family size was 3.31.

The township's age distribution consisted of 21.4% under the age of 18, 15.8% from 18 to 24, 24% from 25 to 44, 24.4% from 45 to 64, and 14.4% who were 65 years of age or older. The median age was 34.8 years. For every 100 females, there were 88.3 males. For every 100 females age 18 and over, there were 84.0 males.

The median income for a household in the township was $65,321, and the median income for a family was $82,223. Males had a median income of $48,080 versus $30,256 for females. The per capita income for the township was $29,311. About 9.1% of families and 10.1% of the population were below the poverty line, including 13.9% of those under age 18 and 7.4% of those age 65 or over.

Historical population
Census	Pop.	Note	%±
2000	33,037		—
2010	40,137		21.5%
2020	39,210		−2.3%
U.S. Decennial Census

== Government ==
The township is governed by an elected Town Board of a Supervisor and four Trustees. The Township also has an elected Assessor, Clerk, Highway Commissioner and Supervisor. The Township Office is located at 1350 Armour Road, Bourbonnais, Illinois 60914.

== Political districts ==
- Illinois's 11th congressional district
- State House District 75
- State House District 79
- State Senate District 38
- State Senate District 40

== School districts ==
- Bradley Elementary School District 61
- Bourbonnais Elementary School District 53
- Bradley-Bourbonnais Community High School District 307
- Kankakee School District 111
- Manteno Community Unit School District 5
- Momence Community Unit School District 1
