= St. Anne Township, Kankakee County, Illinois =

Saint Anne Township
- Township
- Location in Kankakee County

- Kankakee County's location in Illinois
- Coordinates: 41°02′38″N 87°42′58″W
- Country: United States
- State: Illinois
- County: Kankakee
- Established: March 11, 1857

Government
  - Supervisor: Karie Witvoet

Area
  - Total: 30.30 sq mi (78.5 km^{2})
  - Land: 30.25 sq mi (78.3 km^{2})
  - Water: 0.05 sq mi (0.13 km^{2}) 0.16%
- Elevation: 640 ft (195 m)

Population (2020)
  - Total: 2,030
  - Density: 67.1/sq mi (25.9/km^{2})
- Time zone: UTC-6 (CST)
  - Summer (DST): UTC-5 (CDT)
- ZIP codes: 60954, 60964
- FIPS code: 17-091-66651

Saint Anne Township is one of seventeen townships in Kankakee County, Illinois, USA. As of the 2020 census, its population was 2,030 and it contained 912 housing units. The township was created on March 11, 1857, from parts of Aroma Township.

== Geography ==
According to the 2021 census gazetteer files, St. Anne Township has a total area of 30.30 square miles (78.48 km^{2}), of which 30.25 square miles (78.35 km^{2}) (or 99.84%) is land and 0.05 square miles (0.13 km^{2}) (or 0.16%) is water.

=== Cities, towns, villages ===
- St. Anne

=== Adjacent townships ===
- Ganeer Township (north)
- Pembroke Township (east)
- Beaverville Township, Iroquois County (southeast)
- Papineau Township, Iroquois County (southwest)
- Aroma Township (northwest)

=== Major highways ===
- Illinois Route 1

=== Lakes ===
- Cote Lake

== Demographics ==
As of the 2020 census there were 2,030 people, 886 households, and 531 families residing in the township. The population density was 67.00 inhabitants per square mile (25.87/km^{2}). There were 912 housing units at an average density of 30.10 per square mile (11.62/km^{2}). The racial makeup of the township was 78.28% White, 2.86% African American, 0.34% Native American, 0.44% Asian, 0.00% Pacific Islander, 9.61% from other races, and 8.47% from two or more races. Hispanic or Latino of any race were 17.24% of the population.

There were 886 households, out of which 25.10% had children under the age of 18 living with them, 49.21% were married couples living together, 5.08% had a female householder with no spouse present, and 40.07% were non-families. 29.00% of all households were made up of individuals, and 18.40% had someone living alone who was 65 years of age or older. The average household size was 2.40 and the average family size was 3.00.

The township's age distribution consisted of 18.4% under the age of 18, 10.4% from 18 to 24, 19.4% from 25 to 44, 30.5% from 45 to 64, and 21.3% who were 65 years of age or older. The median age was 46.5 years. For every 100 females, there were 89.4 males. For every 100 females age 18 and over, there were 85.4 males.

The median income for a household in the township was $62,115, and the median income for a family was $73,750. Males had a median income of $45,234 versus $26,106 for females. The per capita income for the township was $30,318. About 1.5% of families and 7.2% of the population were below the poverty line, including 0.0% of those under age 18 and 9.3% of those age 65 or over.

Historical population
Census	Pop.	Note	%±
2000	2,078		—
2010	2,191		5.4%
2020	2,030		−7.3%
U.S. Decennial Census

== Government ==
The township is governed by an elected Town Board of a supervisor and four trustees. The township also has an elected assessor, clerk, highway commissioner and supervisor. The township Office is located at 471 West Sheffield, St. Anne, IL 60964.

== Political districts ==
- Illinois's 11th congressional district
- State House District 79
- State Senate District 40

== School districts ==
- St. Anne Community Consolidated School District 256
- St. Anne Community High School District 302
