= Papineau, Illinois =

- Village
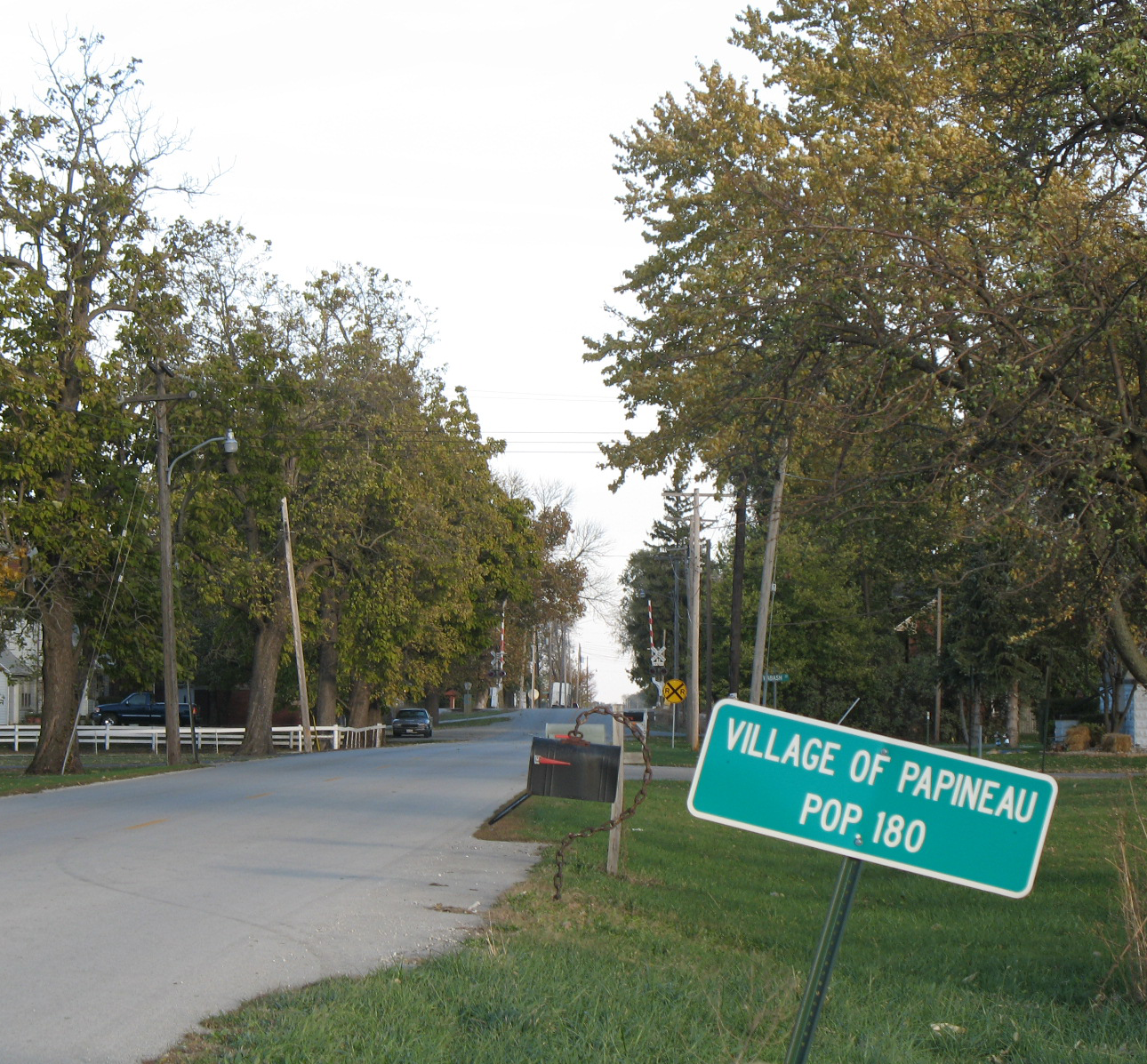
- Looking into Papineau from the west

- Location in Iroquois County, Illinois

- Location in Iroquois County
- Coordinates: 40°58′04″N 87°42′59″W
- Country: United States
- State: Illinois
- County: Iroquois
- Township: Papineau

Area
  - Total: 0.21 sq mi (0.54 km^{2})
  - Land: 0.21 sq mi (0.54 km^{2})
  - Water: 0 sq mi (0.00 km^{2})
- Elevation: 633 ft (193 m)

Population (2020)
  - Total: 133
  - Density: 640.1/sq mi (247.14/km^{2})
- Time zone: UTC-6 (CST)
  - Summer (DST): UTC-5 (CDT)
- ZIP code: 60964
- Area code: 815
- FIPS code: 17-57576
- GNIS feature ID: 2399621

Papineau is a village in Papineau Township, Iroquois County, Illinois, United States. The population was 133 at the 2020 census.

== Geography ==
Papineau is located in northeastern Iroquois County. It is 15 miles (24 km) north of Watseka, the county seat, and 16 miles (26 km) southeast of Kankakee.

According to the 2021 census gazetteer files, Papineau has a total area of 0.21 square miles (0.54 km^{2}), all land.

== Demographics ==
Historical population
Census	Pop.	Note	%±
1880	51		—
1890	141		176.5%
1900	188		33.3%
1910	183		−2.7%
1920	176		−3.8%
1930	154		−12.5%
1940	158		2.6%
1950	157		−0.6%
1960	169		7.6%
1970	219		29.6%
1980	179		−18.3%
1990	142		−20.7%
2000	196		38.0%
2010	171		−12.8%
2020	133		−22.2%
U.S. Decennial Census

As of the 2020 census there were 133 people, 61 households, and 42 families residing in the village. The population density was 639.42 inhabitants per square mile (246.88/km^{2}). There were 65 housing units at an average density of 312.50 per square mile (120.66/km^{2}). The racial makeup of the village was 96.24% White, 0.75% African American, 0.00% Native American, 0.00% Asian, 0.00% Pacific Islander, 0.75% from other races, and 2.26% from two or more races. Hispanic or Latino of any race were 0.75% of the population.

There were 61 households, out of which 21.3% had children under the age of 18 living with them, 54.10% were married couples living together, 9.84% had a female householder with no husband present, and 31.15% were non-families. 31.15% of all households were made up of individuals, and 13.11% had someone living alone who was 65 years of age or older. The average household size was 2.55 and the average family size was 2.10.

The village's age distribution consisted of 20.3% under the age of 18, 3.1% from 18 to 24, 20.3% from 25 to 44, 31.2% from 45 to 64, and 25.0% who were 65 years of age or older. The median age was 51.0 years. For every 100 females, there were 93.9 males. For every 100 females age 18 and over, there were 67.2 males.

The median income for a household in the village was $42,750, and the median income for a family was $52,500. Males had a median income of $41,250 versus $22,250 for females. The per capita income for the village was $21,655. About 2.4% of families and 11.7% of the population were below the poverty line, including none of those under age 18 and 18.8% of those age 65 or over.
