= Joseph M. Pallissard =

Joseph Marie Pallissard
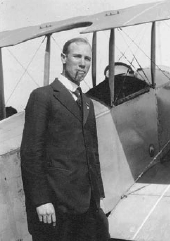
- Born: January 4, 1886; St. Anne, Illinois
- Died: May 24, 1960 (aged 74); Broadview, Illinois

Joseph Marie Pallissard (January 4, 1886 - May 24, 1960) also known as Caproni-Joe, was a pioneer aviator.

== Biography ==
He was born in St. Anne, Illinois, on January 4, 1886. He attended St. Anne's Academy and the University of Illinois.

In 1913, he started a flying school with E. L. Partridge and H. C. Keller at Cicero Field in Chicago, Illinois.

He built his own aircraft and soloed for the first time on June 5, 1915. This flight made him eligible for the Early Birds of Aviation, an organization whose membership was limited to those who had solo piloted a glider, gas balloon or airplane prior to December 17, 1916 (December 17 being the date of the first flights of Wilbur and Orville Wright).

In July 1917, Pallissard helped fly one of the first twenty Curtiss JN-4 "Jennys" to Chanute Field.

Pallissard returned to his farm temporarily in 1927 and then went to work building diesel engines in the General Motors Electro-Motive Division.

He died on May 24, 1960, in Broadview, Illinois, of a heart attack.
