= Saint George, Illinois =

- Unincorporated community
- Location within Illinois Location within the United States
- Coordinates: 41°11′33″N 87°46′32″W
- Country: United States
- State: Illinois
- County: Kankakee
- Township: Ganeer
- Elevation: 656 ft (200 m)
- Time zone: UTC-6 (Central (CST))
  - Summer (DST): UTC-5 (CDT)
- Area codes: 815 & 779
- GNIS feature ID: 417299

Saint George is an unincorporated community in Kankakee County, Illinois, United States. It was one of several populated places in the area settled largely by Metis and French Canadians in the 1840s.
