= Bradley Elementary School District 61 =

School district in Kankakee County, Illinois, United States

Address
- 111 North Crosswell Avenue Bradley, Illinois, 60915; United States

District information
- Type: Public
- Grades: PreK–8
- NCES District ID: 1706930

Students and staff
- Students: 1,387

Other information
- Website: www.bradleyschools.com

Bradley Elementary School District 61 is an elementary school district based in Bradley, a village located in central Kankakee County, Illinois. The district is composed of three schools: two elementary schools and one middle school. No two schools cover the same grade levels. Education in the district starts at Bradley East Elementary School, where prekindergarteners, kindergarteners, and students in grades one and two are educated. The school is headed by principal Anna Kirchner. Graduates move on to Bradley West Elementary School, which educates those in grades three through five. The school is headed by principal Trisha Anderson. Graduates of Bradley West move on to Bradley Central Middle School under principal Mark Kohl, where students in grades six through eight will be educated. The district superintendent is Dr. Scott Goselin.
