= Irwin, Illinois =

- Village
- Location of Irwin in Kankakee County, Illinois

- Location of Illinois in the United States
- Coordinates: 41°03′11″N 87°59′02″W
- Country: United States
- State: Illinois
- County: Kankakee
- Township: Otto

Area
  - Total: 0.046 sq mi (0.12 km^{2})
  - Land: 0.046 sq mi (0.12 km^{2})
  - Water: 0 sq mi (0.00 km^{2})
- Elevation: 656 ft (200 m)

Population (2020)
  - Total: 68
  - Density: 1,519.2/sq mi (586.57/km^{2})
- Time zone: UTC-6 (CST)
  - Summer (DST): UTC-5 (CDT)
- ZIP code: 60901
- Area codes: 815 & 779
- FIPS code: 17-37803
- GNIS feature ID: 2398278

Irwin is a village in Kankakee County, Illinois, United States. The population was 68 at the 2020 census. It is included in the Kankakee-Bradley, Illinois Metropolitan Statistical Area.

== Geography ==
Irwin is located in southern Kankakee County 10 miles (16 km) southwest of Kankakee, the county seat.

According to the 2021 census gazetteer files, Irwin has a total area of 0.05 square miles (0.13 km^{2}), all land.

== Demographics ==
Historical population
Census	Pop.	Note	%±
1910	74		—
1920	102		37.8%
1930	77		−24.5%
1940	66		−14.3%
1950	85		28.8%
1960	92		8.2%
1970	87		−5.4%
1980	112		28.7%
1990	50		−55.4%
2000	92		84.0%
2010	74		−19.6%
2020	68		−8.1%
U.S. Decennial Census

As of the 2020 census there were 68 people, 21 households, and 11 families residing in the village. The population density was 1,511.11 inhabitants per square mile (583.44/km^{2}). There were 31 housing units at an average density of 688.89 per square mile (265.98/km^{2}). The racial makeup of the village was 86.76% White, 1.47% African American, 1.47% Native American, 1.47% Asian, 0.00% Pacific Islander, 1.47% from other races, and 7.35% from two or more races. Hispanic or Latino of any race were 8.82% of the population.

There were 21 households, out of which 28.6% had children under the age of 18 living with them, 23.81% were married couples living together, 23.81% had a female householder with no husband present, and 47.62% were non-families. 47.62% of all households were made up of individuals, and 28.57% had someone living alone who was 65 years of age or older. The average household size was 2.64 and the average family size was 1.86.

The village's age distribution consisted of 25.6% under the age of 18, 2.6% from 18 to 24, 20.6% from 25 to 44, 30.8% from 45 to 64, and 20.5% who were 65 years of age or older. The median age was 53.5 years. For every 100 females, there were 105.3 males. For every 100 females age 18 and over, there were 107.1 males.

The median income for a household in the village was $66,250, and the median income for a family was $73,750. Males had a median income of $52,917 versus $53,750 for females. The per capita income for the village was $37,305. About 9.1% of families and 10.3% of the population were below the poverty line, including 20.0% of those under age 18 and 0.0% of those age 65 or over.

== Notable people ==
- Arch Ward (1896–1955), sports editor for the Chicago Tribune, born in Irwin
