= Sammons Point, Illinois =

- Village
- Location of Sammons Point in Illinois
- Coordinates: 41°01′28″N 87°51′57″W
- Country: United States
- State: Illinois
- County: Kankakee County
- Township: Otto Township
- Incorporated: March 21, 2006
- Reincorporated (after disincorporation): February 5, 2008

Area
  - Total: 1.85 sq mi (4.79 km^{2})
  - Land: 1.85 sq mi (4.79 km^{2})
  - Water: 0 sq mi (0.00 km^{2})
- Elevation: 679 ft (207 m)

Population (2020)
  - Total: 214
  - Density: 115.6/sq mi (44.63/km^{2})
- Time zone: UTC-6 (CST)
  - Summer (DST): UTC-5 (CDT)
- FIPS code: 17-67372
- GNIS feature ID: 2399177
- Website: villageofsammonspoint.org

Sammons Point is a village in Otto Township in south-central Kankakee County, Illinois, United States. Initially incorporated as a village on March 21, 2006, it was disincorporated on August 8, 2007, and incorporated again on February 5, 2008. As of the 2020 census it had a population of 214.

The village is part of the Kankakee–Bradley Metropolitan Statistical Area, which includes all of Kankakee County.

== History ==
=== Failed incorporation ===
Sammons Point was first created in an effort to fend off the proposed expansion of the Waste Management Corporation's landfill. In March 2006, an incorporation election took place, with 82 people (66.7%) voting in favor of the measure and 41 (33.3%) voting against.

Waste Management, which owned land within the new village, wanted all of their land to be unincorporated and under the jurisdiction of the Kankakee County Board instead of Sammons Point. They challenged the validity of the election in court, claiming that its organizers had not followed proper procedures when presenting their original incorporation petitions. The Circuit Court sided with Sammons Point, but Waste Management prevailed in a June 2007 appeal to the Third Appellate Court in Ottawa. A bid by the village for new hearing on the case was denied on August 8, 2007, and Sammons Point was formally disbanded on September 13.

=== Successful incorporation ===
Soon after, efforts to reincorporate the community were revived. A new incorporation election was held on February 5, 2008, with 87 votes (57.2%) cast in favor of reestablishing the village and 65 (42.8%) opposed. Approximately 76 percent of eligible voters participated in the election.

At the November 2016 general election, Sammons Point held a referendum to dissolve, but the referendum was defeated, 30 to 127.

== Government ==
In August 2006, Mike Watson was named as the village's first mayor by a local court order. Six members were also appointed to serve on the board of trustees. They were Stephen Schuricht, Paul Gray, Robert Keller, Budd Meents, Clifford Schroeder and James Turner. Patrick Buescher was appointed to serve as village clerk. They held those positions until municipal elections were conducted in April 2007. In that poll, all of the appointed officials were formally elected. These positions were abolished on September 13, 2007, when Sammons Point was ordered to disband.

Nearly four months after the February 5, 2008, incorporation vote, Circuit Court Judge James B. Kinzer restored Mike Watson to his previous post as mayor. He also named four former village officials and two who had opposed incorporation to the new board of trustees. They were Paul Becker, Pat Buescher, Bill Graham, Robert Keller, Budd Meents, and Stephen Schuricht. Becker and Graham were members of the "Concerned Citizens of Otto Township," a group that opposed incorporation for the village.

For the April 2009 Illinois consolidated election, the first after reincorporation, six names were on the ballot for village trustees — Budd E. Meents (80 votes), Patrick Buescher (75), Stephen W. Schuricht (75), Clifford Schroeder (76), Robert Keller (74), and James Turner (80) — with 147 write-in votes. Michael Watson ran unopposed for village president.

== Geography ==
Sammons Point is in south-central Kankakee County, along U.S. Routes 45 and 52, 6 miles (10 km) south of Kankakee, the county seat, and 4 miles (6 km) northeast of Chebanse. It is bounded on the northeast by the Iroquois River, a north-flowing tributary of the Kankakee River.

According to the 2021 census gazetteer files, Sammons Point has a total area of 1.85 square miles (4.79 km^{2}), all land.

== Demographics ==
Historical population
| Census | Pop. | Note | %± |
|---|---|---|---|
| 2010 | 279 | | — |
| 2020 | 214 | | −23.3% |
U.S. Decennial Census

As of the 2020 census there were 214 people, 71 households, and 55 families residing in the village. The population density was 115.61 inhabitants per square mile (44.64/km^{2}). There were 87 housing units at an average density of 47.00 per square mile (18.15/km^{2}). The racial makeup of the village was 89.72% White, 0.00% African American, 0.00% Native American, 0.47% Asian, 0.00% Pacific Islander, 2.34% from other races, and 7.48% from two or more races. Hispanic or Latino of any race were 8.41% of the population.

There were 71 households, out of which 38.0% had children under the age of 18 living with them, 57.75% were married couples living together, 19.72% had a female householder with no husband present, and 22.54% were non-families. 15.49% of all households were made up of individuals, and 4.23% had someone living alone who was 65 years of age or older. The average household size was 3.27 and the average family size was 2.92.

The village's age distribution consisted of 24.2% under the age of 18, 4.3% from 18 to 24, 25.6% from 25 to 44, 31.3% from 45 to 64, and 14.5% who were 65 years of age or older. The median age was 42.4 years. For every 100 females, there were 101.0 males. For every 100 females age 18 and over, there were 84.7 males.

The median income for a household in the village was $54,750, and the median income for a family was $80,139. Males had a median income of $41,250 versus $31,667 for females. The per capita income for the village was $23,926. About 12.7% of families and 14.0% of the population were below the poverty line, including 22.0% of those under age 18 and 3.3% of those age 65 or over.

== Education ==
Sammons Point is served by the Central Community Unit School District 4, which is based in the Iroquois County village of Clifton.
