= Sumner Township, Kankakee County, Illinois =

Sumner Township
- Township
- Location in Kankakee County

- Kankakee County's location in Illinois
- Coordinates: 41°14′59″N 87°43′27″W
- Country: United States
- State: Illinois
- County: Kankakee
- Established: October 8, 1855

Government
  - Supervisor: Larry Ohm

Area
  - Total: 37.25 sq mi (96.5 km^{2})
  - Land: 37.25 sq mi (96.5 km^{2})
  - Water: 0 sq mi (0 km^{2}) 0%
- Elevation: 699 ft (213 m)

Population (2020)
  - Total: 837
  - Density: 22.5/sq mi (8.68/km^{2})
- Time zone: UTC-6 (CST)
  - Summer (DST): UTC-5 (CDT)
- ZIP codes: 60468, 60940, 60950
- FIPS code: 17-091-73690

Sumner Township is one of seventeen townships in Kankakee County, Illinois, USA. As of the 2020 census, its population was 837 and it contained 336 housing units. It was formed as Union Township from part of Yellow Head Township on October 8, 1855; its name changed to Sumner Township on June 27, 1856.

== Township Headquarters ==
Sumner Township erected a new garage and office in 2016. The new facility is located on 8000 E. Road, just north of the intersection at 9000 N. Road. The old facility was a white block building located in the village of Whitaker on 9000 N. Road.

== Geography ==
According to the 2021 census gazetteer files, Sumner Township has a total area of 37.25 square miles (96.48 km^{2}), all land. The land in Sumner Township is predominantly flat, with the exception of a few select areas. The rich, dark prairie soils make the township valuable as farmland. Several small creeks run through the township and flow toward the Kankakee River.

== Demographics ==
As of the 2020 census there were 837 people, 246 households, and 165 families residing in the township. The population density was 22.47 inhabitants per square mile (8.68/km^{2}). There were 336 housing units at an average density of 9.02 per square mile (3.48/km^{2}). The racial makeup of the township was 90.44% White, 0.00% African American, 0.00% Native American, 0.12% Asian, 0.00% Pacific Islander, 2.87% from other races, and 6.57% from two or more races. Hispanic or Latino of any race were 8.24% of the population.

There were 246 households, out of which 12.60% had children under the age of 18 living with them, 61.79% were married couples living together, 2.44% had a female householder with no spouse present, and 32.93% were non-families. 23.60% of all households were made up of individuals, and 14.20% had someone living alone who was 65 years of age or older. The average household size was 2.37 and the average family size was 2.88.

The township's age distribution consisted of 10.7% under the age of 18, 11.0% from 18 to 24, 24.1% from 25 to 44, 37.3% from 45 to 64, and 17.0% who were 65 years of age or older. The median age was 47.3 years. For every 100 females, there were 111.6 males. For every 100 females age 18 and over, there were 108.8 males.

The median income for a household in the township was $72,188, and the median income for a family was $95,469. Males had a median income of $49,881 versus $32,917 for females. The per capita income for the township was $32,741. About 4.8% of families and 8.9% of the population were below the poverty line, including 0.0% of those under age 18 and 23.2% of those age 65 or over.

Historical population
| Census | Pop. | Note | %± |
|---|---|---|---|
| 2000 | 890 | | — |
| 2010 | 910 | | 2.2% |
| 2020 | 837 | | −8.0% |
U.S. Decennial Census

== Water bodies ==
Many creeks run at a southwest direction toward the township. They provide drainage for the townships farmland and residences. Three of these creeks begin the Will Township, Sumner Township's neighbor to the north in Will County. These include the Marshall Slough, Rock Creek, and the Exline Slough. The Marshall Slough cuts through Sumner Township in the far northwest corner and quickly cuts into Manteno Township. Rock Creek also cuts quickly through the township before it cuts into Manteno Township a mile south of Sumner Township's northern border. The Exline Slough is the biggest creek in Sumner Township and runs all the way from County Line Road at the north edge of the township to 6000 N. Rd. In Section 30 the Canavan Slough, which starts a mile north of the town of Whitaker, joins up with the Exline Slough. Farr Creek begins a half mile south of the southern border of Sumner Township, in Section 32, before crossing the southern border. Tower Creek starts in the northeast quarter of the township and runs into Ganeer Township which is south of Sumner Township.

=== Infrastructure ===
- Illinois Route 1

=== Adjacent townships ===
- Will Township, Will County (north)
- Washington Township, Will County (northeast)
- Yellowhead Township (east)
- Momence Township (southeast)
- Ganeer Township (south)
- Bourbonnais Township (southwest)
- Manteno Township (west)

== Government ==
The township is governed by an elected Town Board of a supervisor and four trustees. The township also has an elected assessor, clerk, highway commissioner and supervisor. The township office is located at 9315 North 8000 East Road, Grant Park, IL 60940.

=== Cemeteries ===
The township contains these three cemeteries: Heusing, Zion Lutheran (Sollitt) and Saint Paul Lutheran (Petersburg).

== Political districts ==
- Illinois' 11th congressional district
- State House District 79
- State Senate District 40

== School districts ==
- Grant Park Community Unit School District 6
- Manteno Community Unit School District 5
