= Hopkins Park, Illinois =

- Village
- Location of Hopkins Park in Kankakee County, Illinois

- Location of Illinois in the United States
- Coordinates: 41°04′11″N 87°37′05″W
- Country: United States
- State: Illinois
- County: Kankakee
- Township: Pembroke

Area
  - Total: 4.14 sq mi (10.71 km^{2})
  - Land: 4.14 sq mi (10.71 km^{2})
  - Water: 0 sq mi (0.00 km^{2})
- Elevation: 679 ft (207 m)

Population (2020)
  - Total: 597
  - Density: 144.3/sq mi (55.72/km^{2})
- Time zone: UTC-6 (CST)
  - Summer (DST): UTC-5 (CDT)
- ZIP code: 60944
- Area codes: 815 & 779
- FIPS code: 17-36190
- GNIS feature ID: 2398544
- Wikimedia Commons: Hopkins Park, Illinois
- Website: www.hopkinspark-il.org

Hopkins Park is a village in Kankakee County, Illinois, United States. The population was 597 at the 2020 census. It is part of the Kankakee–Bradley Metropolitan Statistical Area.

== Geography ==
Hopkins Park is located in southeastern Kankakee County. It is 15 miles (24 km) southeast of Kankakee, the county seat, and includes the former unincorporated community of Doney. Hopkins Park remains a rural, largely undeveloped community. Many of the roads are gravel, and a large portion of the population lives in an off-the-grid fashion. The town has very little to offer in terms of commerce and only recently did the area receive a gas pipeline. It has also been said that many of the residents, due to their off-the-grid lifestyle, were unable to be counted during the Census.

According to the 2021 census gazetteer files, Hopkins Park has a total area of 4.14 square miles (10.72 km^{2}), all land.

Hopkins Park is located on the Pembroke Savanna.

== Demographics ==
Historical population
Census	Pop.	Note	%±
1980	673		—
1990	601		−10.7%
2000	711		18.3%
2010	603		−15.2%
2020	597		−1.0%
U.S. Decennial Census

As of the 2020 census there were 597 people, 269 households, and 144 families residing in the village. The population density was 144.31 inhabitants per square mile (55.72/km^{2}). There were 307 housing units at an average density of 74.21 per square mile (28.65/km^{2}). The racial makeup of the village was 12.73% White, 80.07% African American, 0.00% Native American, 0.00% Asian, 0.00% Pacific Islander, 3.52% from other races, and 3.69% from two or more races. Hispanic or Latino of any race were 8.88% of the population.

There were 269 households, out of which 24.9% had children under the age of 18 living with them, 26.39% were married couples living together, 25.65% had a female householder with no husband present, and 46.47% were non-families. 45.72% of all households were made up of individuals, and 21.19% had someone living alone who was 65 years of age or older. The average household size was 3.22 and the average family size was 2.20.

The village's age distribution consisted of 18.1% under the age of 18, 8.8% from 18 to 24, 19.7% from 25 to 44, 30.2% from 45 to 64, and 23.2% who were 65 years of age or older. The median age was 47.8 years. For every 100 females, there were 91.9 males. For every 100 females age 18 and over, there were 102.5 males.

The median income for a household in the village was $26,555, and the median income for a family was $34,286. Males had a median income of $15,625 versus $21,594 for females. The per capita income for the village was $14,536. About 6.9% of families and 20.5% of the population were below the poverty line, including 16.8% of those under age 18 and 21.2% of those age 65 or over.

Hopkins Park, Illinois – Racial and ethnic composition Note: the US Census treats Hispanic/Latino as an ethnic category. This table excludes Latinos from the racial categories and assigns them to a separate category. Hispanics/Latinos may be of any race.
Race / Ethnicity (NH = Non-Hispanic)	Pop 2000	Pop 2010	Pop 2020	% 2000	% 2010	% 2020
White alone (NH)	29	24	52	4.08%	3.98%	8.71%
Black or African American alone (NH)	655	563	478	92.12%	93.37%	80.07%
Native American or Alaska Native alone (NH)	0	1	0	0.00%	0.17%	0.00%
Asian alone (NH)	1	3	0	0.14%	0.50%	0.00%
Pacific Islander alone (NH)	0	0	0	0.00%	0.00%	0.00%
Other race alone (NH)	0	0	1	0.00%	0.00%	0.17%
Mixed race or Multiracial (NH)	11	5	13	1.55%	0.83%	2.18%
Hispanic or Latino (any race)	15	7	53	2.11%	1.16%	8.88%
Total	711	603	597	100.00%	100.00%	100.00%
