= Iroquois River (Indiana-Illinois) =

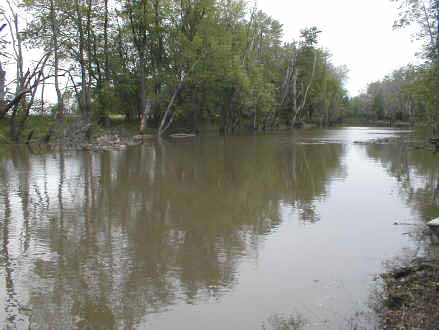
- The Iroquois River in Newton County, Indiana.

Location
- Country: United States

Physical characteristics
- Source
  - location: NW of Rensselaer, Newton Township, Jasper County, Indiana
  - coordinates: 40°57′55″N 87°12′23″W
  - elevation: 705 feet (215 m)
- Mouth
  - location: Kankakee, Illinois
  - coordinates: 41°04′27″N 87°48′59″W
  - elevation: 599 feet (183 m)
- Length: 103 mi (166 km)
- Basin size: 2,091 mi^{2} (5,420 km^{2})
- Discharge
  - average: 1,741 cubic feet per second (49.3 m^{3}/s)

Basin features
- Progression: Iroquois River → Kankakee → Illinois → Mississippi → Gulf of Mexico
- GNIS ID: 410927

The Iroquois River is a 103-mile-long (166 km) tributary of the Kankakee River in the Central Corn Belt Plains of northwestern Indiana and northeastern Illinois in the United States. It was named for the Haudenosaunee people. Via the Kankakee and Illinois rivers, it is part of the watershed of the Mississippi River.

== Course ==
The Iroquois River rises in Jasper County, Indiana, and flows generally west-southwestwardly through Newton County, Indiana, and Iroquois County, Illinois, where it turns northward and flows into Kankakee County, Illinois. It enters the Kankakee River from the south in Kankakee County, opposite the village of Aroma Park, about 4 miles (6 km) southeast of the city of Kankakee.

Along its course the Iroquois passes the towns of Rensselaer, Brook, and Kentland in Indiana and the towns of Iroquois, Watseka and Sugar Island in Illinois.

== Variant names ==
According to the Geographic Names Information System, the Iroquois River, or portions thereof, has also been known as:

- Borntrager Ditch
- Burns Ditch
- Irokois River
- Iroquois Ditch
- Pickamick River
- Pickamink Lateral
- Swain Ditch
- Thompson Ditch

=== La rivière des Iroquois ===
The name, La rivière des Iroquois was given to the riverway by the French, through the Annual of René de la Salle. It has been proposed that the river got it name from la Fourche des Iroquois or the Fork of the Iroquois, now Aroma Park. The French phrase would be a reference to "the Irouquois' Fork" or a place where the French or the French allied tribes (Illini) had an experience with the Haudenosaunee at this location.

The French explores had arrived in the Kankakee basin René-Robert Cavelier, Sieur de La Salle in 1679. The Haudenosaunee (Iroquois) had been raiding across the Michigan Peninsula over the previous decade and began to move further west around the southern tip of Lac de Illinois or Lake Michigan. In 1682 he built Fort St. Louis atop Starved Rock State Park on the Illinois River as a place of refuge from raiding Haudenosaunee. Thus, the history of the Beaver Wars as the Haudenosaunee raids became known and the French name for the junction of the modern Iroquois River and the Kankakee River implies the movement of Haudenosaunee raiding bands through this location and probably using the Iroquois River route as their way around the Great marsh of the Kankakee.

A legend among the Illinois tells of a time the Haudenosaunee were surprised along the bank of this waterway and were driven away with great losses. (Charlevoix‘ Narrative Journal, 1721, vol. 2, p. 199.) Colonel Guerdon Hubbard hears a similar story in the middle 19th Century.

== Basin ==
The Iroquois river is fed by the Sugar, Mud, Fountain Spring, Prairie, Langham, Pike and Beaver creeks. The Iroquois river, from the Sugar Island around Iroquois County Rd 3300 N to mouth in Aroma Park, the river is shallow and rocky. It is bordered by silurian limestone. South of the island the river is deep and slow moving, nearly to the state line.

The Iroquois begins in the low lands, north and west of Rensselaer, Indiana. It circles clockwise to the north and east, entering Rensselaer from the east. Continuing southwestward for more than 30 miles (48 km) to Watseka, Illinois. Here the river turns towards the north, reaching its junction with the Kankakee another 30 miles (48 km).

== Towns and cities ==
- Rensselaer, Indiana
- Brook, Indiana
- Kentland, Indiana
- Iroquois, Illinois
- Watseka, Illinois
- Sugar Island, Illinois

== See also ==
- Kankakee River
- List of Illinois rivers
- List of Indiana rivers

== Sources ==
- Columbia Gazetteer of North America entry
- DeLorme (2003). Illinois Atlas & Gazetteer. Yarmouth, Maine: DeLorme. ISBN 0-89933-321-4.
- DeLorme (1998). Indiana Atlas & Gazetteer. Yarmouth, Maine: DeLorme. ISBN 0-89933-211-0.

== Gallery ==
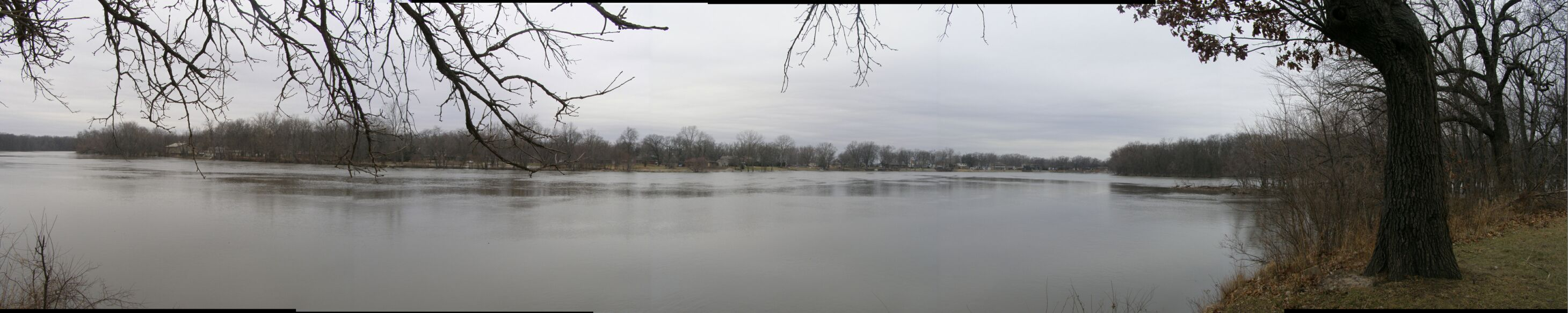
Junction of the Iroquois River (left) with the Kankakee River at Aroma Park, Illinois

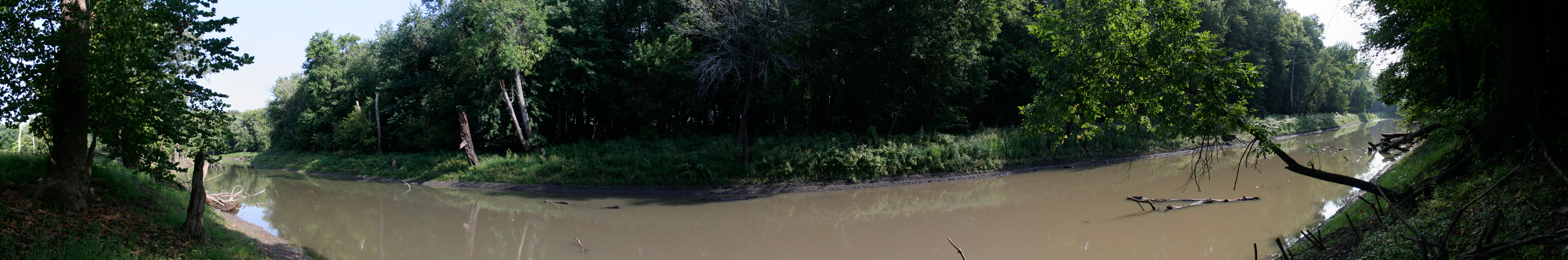
Junction of the Iroquois River (left) with the Newton County Fair grounds in Kentland, Indiana By Andrew Spiker
