= Limestone Township, Kankakee County, Illinois =

Limestone Township
- Township
- Location in Kankakee County

- Kankakee County's location in Illinois
- Coordinates: 41°8′N 87°58′W
- Country: United States
- State: Illinois
- County: Kankakee
- Established: May 9, 1853

Government
  - Supervisor: Marcie Kolberg Township Clerk = Richard J Berns =

Area
  - Total: 41.40 sq mi (107.2 km^{2})
  - Land: 40.38 sq mi (104.6 km^{2})
  - Water: 1.02 sq mi (2.6 km^{2}) 2.47%
- Elevation: 650 ft (198 m)

Population (2020)
  - Total: 5,057
  - Density: 125.2/sq mi (48.35/km^{2})
- Time zone: UTC-6 (CST)
  - Summer (DST): UTC-5 (CDT)
- ZIP codes: 60901, 60913
- FIPS code: 17-091-43497

Limestone Township is one of seventeen townships in Kankakee County, Illinois, USA. As of the 2020 census, its population was 5,057 and it contained 2,018 housing units. Limestone Township is one of the six original townships in the county.

== Geography ==
According to the 2021 census gazetteer files, Limestone Township has a total area of 41.40 square miles (107.23 km^{2}), of which 40.38 square miles (104.58 km^{2}) (or 97.53%) is land and 1.02 square miles (2.64 km^{2}) (or 2.47%) is water.

=== Cities, towns, villages ===
- Kankakee (west edge)
- Limestone

=== Unincorporated towns ===
- Greenwich at 41.118°N 87.927°W
- Hillside Manor at 41.116°N 87.948°W

(This list is based on USGS data and may include former settlements.)

=== Adjacent townships ===
- Rockville Township (north)
- Bourbonnais Township (northeast)
- Kankakee Township (east)
- Otto Township (southeast)
- Pilot Township (southwest)
- Salina Township (west)
- Custer Township, Will County (northwest)

=== Cemeteries ===
The township contains these two cemeteries: Limestone and Schreffler.

=== Major highways ===
- Illinois Route 17

=== Airports and landing strips ===
- Kankakee Airport

=== Landmarks ===
- Kankakee River State Park (vast majority)

== Demographics ==
As of the 2020 census there were 5,057 people, 1,822 households, and 1,491 families residing in the township. The population density was 122.14 inhabitants per square mile (47.16/km^{2}). There were 2,018 housing units at an average density of 48.74 per square mile (18.82/km^{2}). The racial makeup of the township was 92.78% White, 0.59% African American, 0.22% Native American, 0.44% Asian, 0.00% Pacific Islander, 1.09% from other races, and 4.88% from two or more races. Hispanic or Latino of any race were 3.56% of the population.

There were 1,822 households, out of which 23.20% had children under the age of 18 living with them, 72.45% were married couples living together, 6.86% had a female householder with no spouse present, and 18.17% were non-families. 13.50% of all households were made up of individuals, and 6.90% had someone living alone who was 65 years of age or older. The average household size was 2.63 and the average family size was 2.85.

The township's age distribution consisted of 20.0% under the age of 18, 7.5% from 18 to 24, 22.8% from 25 to 44, 29.9% from 45 to 64, and 19.9% who were 65 years of age or older. The median age was 44.8 years. For every 100 females, there were 106.5 males. For every 100 females age 18 and over, there were 106.5 males.

The median income for a household in the township was $89,896, and the median income for a family was $103,844. Males had a median income of $61,010 versus $40,403 for females. The per capita income for the township was $39,942. About 3.4% of families and 7.5% of the population were below the poverty line, including 13.7% of those under age 18 and 3.7% of those age 65 or over.

Historical population
Census	Pop.	Note	%±
2000	4,659		—
2010	5,035		8.1%
2020	5,057		0.4%
U.S. Decennial Census

== Government ==
The township is governed by an elected Town Board of a Supervisor and four Trustees. The Township also has an elected Assessor, Clerk, Highway Commissioner and Supervisor. The Township Office is located at 5030 West Route 17, Kankakee, IL 60901.

== Political districts ==
- Illinois' 11th congressional district
- State House District 75
- State Senate District 38

== School districts ==
- Herscher Community Unit School District 2
