= Aroma Park, Illinois =

- Village
- Location of Aroma Park in Illinois

- Location of Illinois in the United States
- Coordinates: 41°04′44″N 87°48′04″W
- Country: United States
- State: Illinois
- County: Kankakee
- Township: Aroma

Area
  - Total: 2.20 sq mi (5.70 km^{2})
  - Land: 1.88 sq mi (4.88 km^{2})
  - Water: 0.32 sq mi (0.83 km^{2})
- Elevation: 607 ft (185 m)

Population (2020)
  - Total: 664
  - Density: 352.7/sq mi (136.19/km^{2})
- Time zone: UTC-6 (CST)
  - Summer (DST): UTC-5 (CDT)
- ZIP code: 60910
- Area codes: 815, 779
- FIPS code: 17-02258
- GNIS feature ID: 2397990
- Wikimedia Commons: Aroma Park, Illinois
- Website: villageofaromapark.com

Aroma Park (formerly Waldron) is a village in Kankakee County, Illinois, United States, along the Kankakee River opposite the mouth of the Iroquois River. Aroma Park is a suburb of the city of Kankakee. Aroma Park's population was 664 at the 2020 census, down from 743 at the 2010 census. It is included in the Kankakee-Bradley, Illinois Metropolitan Statistical Area.

== History ==
In 1995, the Aroma Park Little League All-Stars won the state championship, becoming the smallest town ever to do so.

=== 2026 tornado ===
During the afternoon of March 10, 2026, a destructive EF3 tornado tracked through portions of the suburb, damaging and destroying numerous homes and killing one person in the area.

== Geography ==
Aroma Park is located in southern Kankakee County. It is 4 miles (6 km) southeast of the center of Kankakee.

According to the 2021 census gazetteer files, Aroma Park has a total area of 2.20 square miles (5.70 km^{2}), of which 1.88 square miles (4.87 km^{2}) (or 85.51%) is land and 0.32 square miles (0.83 km^{2}) (or 14.49%) is water.

== Demographics ==
Historical population
Census	Pop.	Note	%±
1880	353		—
1890	308		−12.7%
1900	295		−4.2%
1910	261		−11.5%
1920	266		1.9%
1930	376		41.4%
1940	497		32.2%
1950	544		9.5%
1960	744		36.8%
1970	896		20.4%
1980	673		−24.9%
1990	690		2.5%
2000	821		19.0%
2010	743		−9.5%
2020	664		−10.6%
U.S. Decennial Census

As of the 2020 census there were 664 people, 274 households, and 163 families residing in the village. The population density was 301.68 inhabitants per square mile (116.48/km^{2}). There were 292 housing units at an average density of 132.67 per square mile (51.22/km^{2}). The racial makeup of the village was 83.89% White, 4.52% African American, 0.30% Native American, 0.30% Asian, 0.00% Pacific Islander, 4.37% from other races, and 6.63% from two or more races. Hispanic or Latino of any race were 10.39% of the population.

There were 274 households, out of which 24.1% had children under the age of 18 living with them, 51.46% were married couples living together, 6.57% had a female householder with no husband present, and 40.51% were non-families. 29.93% of all households were made up of individuals, and 11.68% had someone living alone who was 65 years of age or older. The average household size was 3.17 and the average family size was 2.50.

The village's age distribution consisted of 16.3% under the age of 18, 5.5% from 18 to 24, 23.9% from 25 to 44, 33.9% from 45 to 64, and 20.2% who were 65 years of age or older. The median age was 47.0 years. For every 100 females, there were 99.4 males. For every 100 females age 18 and over, there were 99.7 males.

The median income for a household in the village was $48,750, and the median income for a family was $65,750. Males had a median income of $45,000 versus $30,625 for females. The per capita income for the village was $25,985. About 11.0% of families and 12.7% of the population were below the poverty line, including 3.8% of those under age 18 and 25.7% of those age 65 or over.

== Transportation ==
River Valley Metro provides bus service on Route 5 connecting Aroma Park to destinations in the Kankakee area.
