= St. Anne, Illinois =

- Village
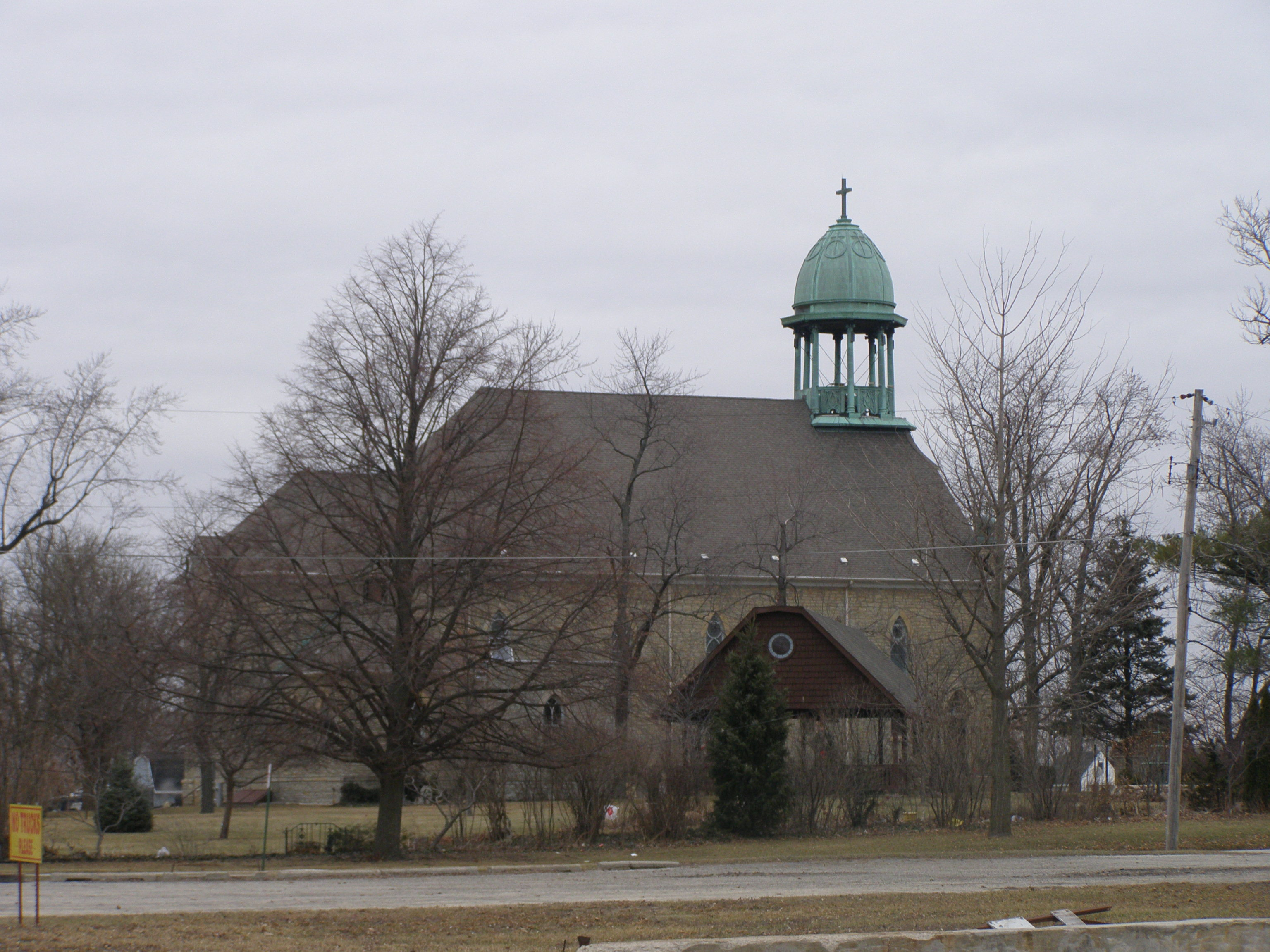
- Shrine and parish church of St. Anne
- Nickname: St. Anners
- Location of St. Anne in Kankakee County, Illinois

- Location of Illinois in the United States
- Coordinates: 41°01′23″N 87°43′05″W
- Country: United States
- State: Illinois
- County: Kankakee
- Township: St. Anne

Area
  - Total: 0.86 sq mi (2.23 km^{2})
  - Land: 0.83 sq mi (2.15 km^{2})
  - Water: 0.031 sq mi (0.08 km^{2})
- Elevation: 664 ft (202 m)

Population (2020)
  - Total: 1,161
  - Density: 1,398.1/sq mi (539.81/km^{2})
- Time zone: UTC-6 (CST)
  - Summer (DST): UTC-5 (CDT)
- ZIP code: 60964
- Area codes: 815 & 779
- FIPS code: 17-66638
- GNIS feature ID: 2399157
- Wikimedia Commons: St. Anne, Illinois
- Website: www.villageofstanne.com

St. Anne (sometimes spelled Saint Anne) is a village in Kankakee County, Illinois, United States. The population was 1,161 at the 2020 census. It is part of the Kankakee–Bourbonnais–Bradley Metropolitan Statistical Area. It was founded in 1851 by Charles Chiniquy, a French-Canadian Catholic priest and law client of the 16th U.S. President Abraham Lincoln, who was excommunicated by the Catholic Church in 1856. He later converted to Protestant Christianity, becoming a Presbyterian Evangelical minister and a well-known temperance activist in Canada and the United States.

== Geography ==
St. Anne is located in southeastern Kankakee County. Illinois Route 1 passes through the west side of the village. It is 13 miles (21 km) southeast of Kankakee, the county seat, and 18 miles (29 km) north of Watseka.

According to the 2021 census gazetteer files, St. Anne has a total area of 0.86 square miles (2.23 km^{2}), of which 0.83 square miles (2.15 km^{2}) (or 96.51%) is land and 0.03 square miles (0.08 km^{2}) (or 3.49%) is water.

== Demographics ==
Historical population
Census	Pop.	Note	%±
1880	412		—
1890	718		74.3%
1900	1,000		39.3%
1910	1,065		6.5%
1920	1,067		0.2%
1930	1,078		1.0%
1940	1,131		4.9%
1950	1,403		24.0%
1960	1,378		−1.8%
1970	1,271		−7.8%
1980	1,421		11.8%
1990	1,153		−18.9%
2000	1,212		5.1%
2010	1,257		3.7%
2020	1,161		−7.6%
U.S. Decennial Census

=== 2020 census ===
As of the 2020 census, there were 1,161 people, 480 households, and 301 families residing in the village. The population density was 1,350.00 inhabitants per square mile (521.24/km^{2}). There were 543 housing units at an average density of 631.40 per square mile (243.78/km^{2}).

The median age was 39.8 years. 22.0% of residents were under the age of 18 and 17.7% of residents were 65 years of age or older. For every 100 females, there were 103.7 males, and for every 100 females age 18 and over, there were 96.1 males.

0.0% of residents lived in urban areas, while 100.0% lived in rural areas.

Of the 480 households, 32.9% had children under the age of 18 living in them. Of all households, 44.2% were married-couple households, 18.8% were households with a male householder and no spouse or partner present, and 27.3% were households with a female householder and no spouse or partner present. About 29.0% of all households were made up of individuals, and 11.7% had someone living alone who was 65 years of age or older. Of all housing units, 11.6% were vacant; the homeowner vacancy rate was 5.2% and the rental vacancy rate was 11.6%.

Racial composition as of the 2020 census
Race	Number	Percent
White	870	74.9%
Black or African American	40	3.4%
American Indian and Alaska Native	7	0.6%
Asian	6	0.5%
Native Hawaiian and Other Pacific Islander	0	0.0%
Some other race	117	10.1%
Two or more races	121	10.4%
Hispanic or Latino (of any race)	225	19.4%

=== Income and poverty ===
The median income for a household in the village was $60,469, and the median income for a family was $77,404. Males had a median income of $50,577 versus $22,083 for females. The per capita income for the village was $28,602. About 0.0% of families and 8.3% of the population were below the poverty line, including 0.0% of those under age 18 and 14.8% of those age 65 or over.

=== Political affiliation ===
A majority of St. Anne's is part of Illinois's 2nd congressional district, which is currently represented by Democrat Robin Kelly, though part of the town also falls under Illinois' 16th district and Republican representative Adam Kinzinger.

== Education ==
St. Anne Community High School is the sole high school within the region, and an elementary school also named for the town exists across the street from the high school. The closest institution of higher education to St. Anne is Kankakee Community College.

== Transportation ==
Illinois Route 1, part of the Western route of the historic Dixie Highway, runs north and south in St. Anne. Interstate 57 is the closest interstate highway to St Anne. The town is also located about 5 miles away from the banks of the Iroquois River, which itself connects to the rest of the world through the Mississippi, Illinois, and Kankakee Rivers.

St. Anne has no passenger railroad services of its own, however, Union Pacific Railroad owns freight rail tracks which pass through the city. St. Anne formerly was served by passenger rail, then operated by the New York Central Railroad, the Missouri Pacific Railroad and the Chicago and Eastern Illinois Railroad.

Air transport is limited in St. Anne, with the closest airport being the general aviation-exclusive Kankakee Airport. Commercial air service's closest links to St. Anne are through the two major Chicago airports, with Midway being slightly closer to St. Anne than O'Hare.

== Notable people ==
- Jack Sikma (born 1955), seven-time NBA All-Star and Hall of Fame center for 1979 NBA champion Seattle SuperSonics; attended St. Anne High School
- Joseph M. Pallissard (1886–1960), one of the Early Birds of Aviation. He was a childhood resident of St. Anne.
- Florence Price (1887–1953), classical composer, pianist, organist and music teacher. Price maintained a seasonal residence in St. Anne. In 2009, a couple who were renovating an abandoned house on the outskirts of St. Anne discovered that it contained a trove of her manuscripts including dozens of pieces that had been thought lost.

== See also ==
- Revolution, television series that dramatized St. Anne, Illinois
