= Papineau Township, Iroquois County, Illinois =

Papineau Township
- Township
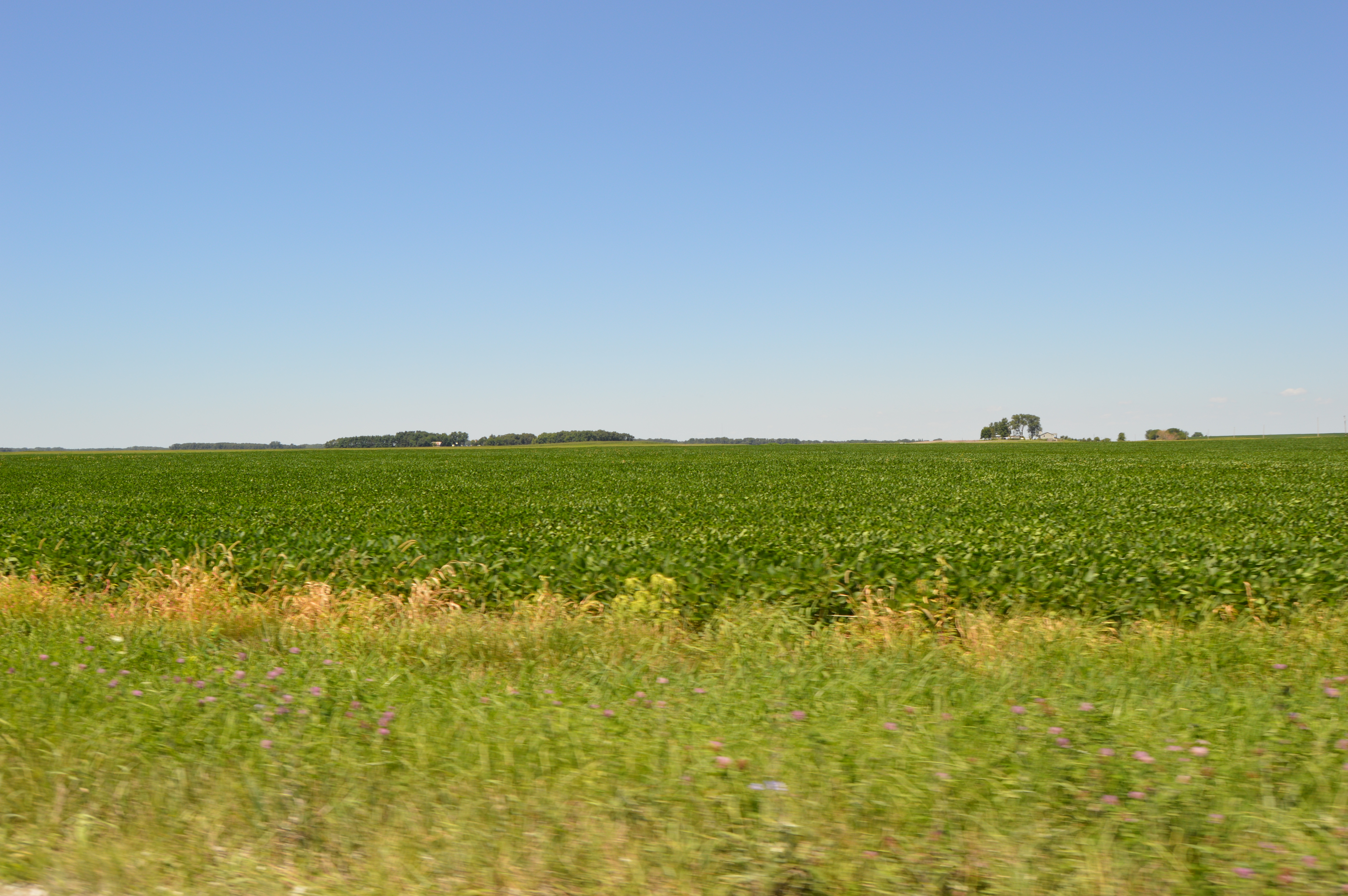
- Fields west of Beaverville

- Location in Iroquois County

- Iroquois County's location in Illinois
- Coordinates: 40°59′N 87°45′W
- Country: United States
- State: Illinois
- County: Iroquois
- Established: November 6, 1855

Area
  - Total: 29.64 sq mi (76.8 km^{2})
  - Land: 29.49 sq mi (76.4 km^{2})
  - Water: 0.14 sq mi (0.36 km^{2}) 0.48%
- Elevation: 614 ft (187 m)

Population (2020)
  - Total: 445
  - Density: 15.1/sq mi (5.83/km^{2})
- Time zone: UTC-6 (CST)
  - Summer (DST): UTC-5 (CDT)
- ZIP codes: 60912, 60951, 60964
- FIPS code: 17-075-57589

Papineau Township is one of twenty-six townships in Iroquois County, Illinois, USA. As of the 2020 census, its population was 445 and it contained 204 housing units.

Originally named Weygandt by early Dutch settlers, the township name was changed in 1862 by later French-Canadian settlers to Papineau, after the Québec nationalist hero of the 1830s Louis-Joseph Papineau.

== Geography ==
According to the 2021 census gazetteer files, Papineau Township has a total area of 29.64 square miles (76.77 km^{2}), of which 29.49 square miles (76.38 km^{2}) (or 99.52%) is land and 0.14 square miles (0.36 km^{2}) (or 0.48%) is water.

=== Cities, towns, villages ===
- Papineau

=== Cemeteries ===
The township contains these four cemeteries: Jones, Oak Ridge, Papineau and Saint Joseph.

=== Major highways ===
- Illinois Route 1

== Demographics ==
As of the 2020 census there were 445 people, 156 households, and 107 families residing in the township. The population density was 15.02 inhabitants per square mile (5.80/km^{2}). There were 204 housing units at an average density of 6.88 per square mile (2.66/km^{2}). The racial makeup of the township was 92.81% White, 0.22% African American, 0.00% Native American, 0.45% Asian, 0.00% Pacific Islander, 0.67% from other races, and 5.84% from two or more races. Hispanic or Latino of any race were 0.90% of the population.

There were 156 households, out of which 32.10% had children under the age of 18 living with them, 49.36% were married couples living together, 10.26% had a female householder with no spouse present, and 31.41% were non-families. 23.10% of all households were made up of individuals, and 5.10% had someone living alone who was 65 years of age or older. The average household size was 2.33 and the average family size was 2.61.

The township's age distribution consisted of 27.5% under the age of 18, 1.1% from 18 to 24, 19.6% from 25 to 44, 36.1% from 45 to 64, and 15.7% who were 65 years of age or older. The median age was 45.4 years. For every 100 females, there were 92.1 males. For every 100 females age 18 and over, there were 90.6 males.

The median income for a household in the township was $45,729, and the median income for a family was $49,821. Males had a median income of $31,563 versus $34,306 for females. The per capita income for the township was $30,556. About 7.5% of families and 11.4% of the population were below the poverty line, including 0.0% of those under age 18 and 19.3% of those age 65 or over.

Historical population
Census	Pop.	Note	%±
2000	664		—
2010	499		−24.8%
2020	445		−10.8%
U.S. Decennial Census

== School districts ==
- Donovan Community Unit School District 3

== Political districts ==
- Illinois's 15th congressional district
- State House District 79
- State Senate District 40
