= Kankakee County, Illinois =

County in Illinois, United States

- County
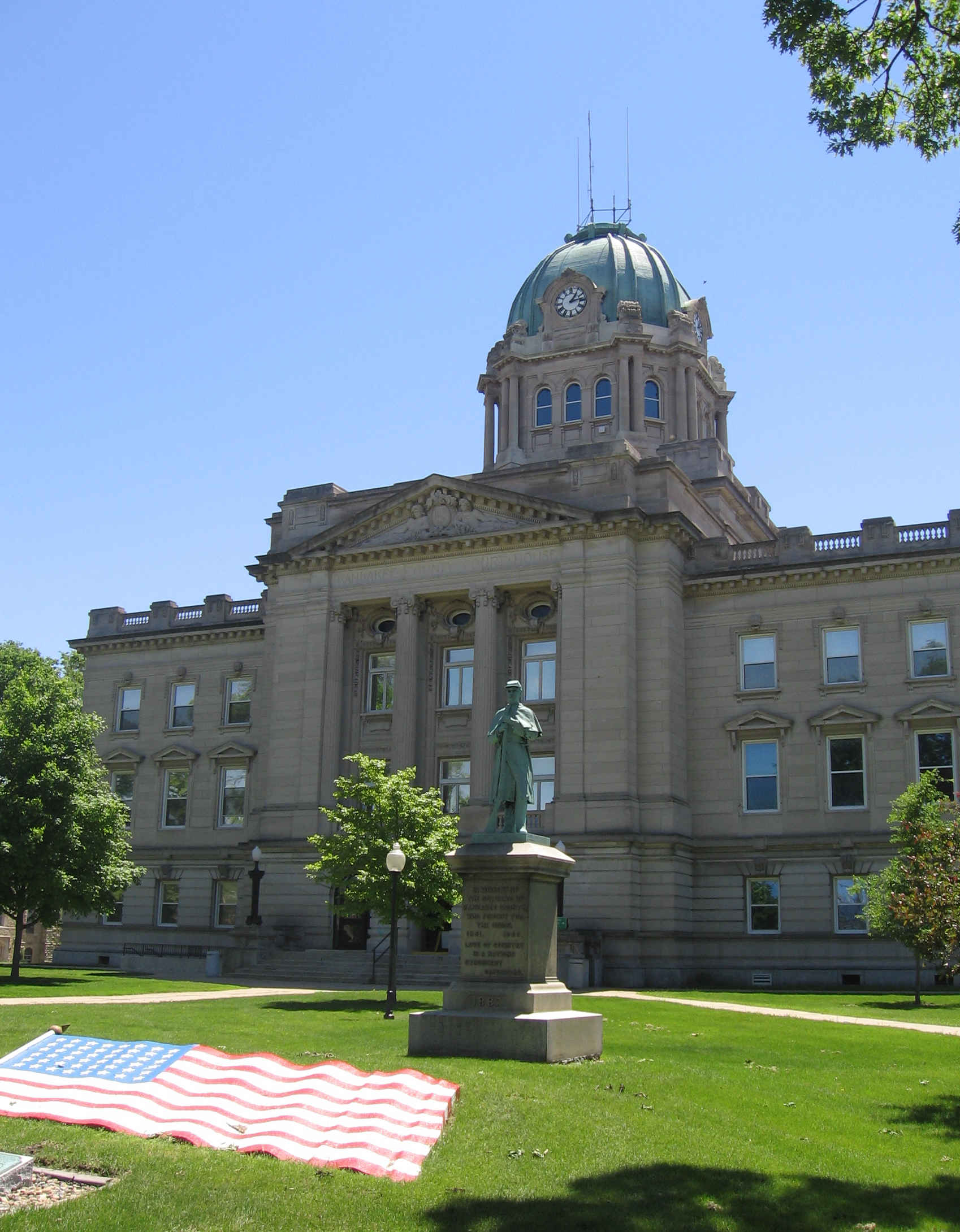
- Kankakee County Courthouse

- Location within the U.S. state of Illinois
- Coordinates: 41°08′N 87°52′W
- Country: United States
- State: Illinois
- Founded: February 11, 1853
- Named for: Kankakee River
- Seat: Kankakee
- Largest city: Kankakee

Area
  - Total: 681 sq mi (1,760 km^{2})
  - Land: 677 sq mi (1,750 km^{2})
  - Water: 4.8 sq mi (12 km^{2}) 0.7%

Population (2020)
  - Total: 107,502
  - Estimate (2025): 105,525 ▼
  - Density: 159/sq mi (61.3/km^{2})
- Time zone: UTC−6 (Central)
  - Summer (DST): UTC−5 (CDT)
- Congressional districts: 1st, 2nd
- Website: www.k3county.net

Kankakee County is a county located in the U.S. state of Illinois. According to the 2020 census, it has a population of 107,502. Its county seat is Kankakee. Kankakee County comprises the Kankakee, IL Metropolitan Statistical Area.

== History ==
Starting in the 1770s, if not earlier, the area that is now Kankakee County was largely populated by the Potawatomi.

French Canadian Settlers came to Kankakee County in 1834, after the federal government signed the Treaty of Camp Tippecanoe in 1832. They were soon joined by migrants from New York and Vermont, mostly locating in Momence, Illinois. In the 1840s, most of the migrants were French Canadians, and they settled in such places as Bourbonnais.

An act of the Illinois Legislature created Kankakee County out of the north part of Iroquois County and the south part of Will County in February 1853. The six original townships were Yellowhead, Rockville, Bourbonnais, Momence, Aroma Park, and Limestone. The population of the new county was about 8,000. In 1855 the two western townships (Norton and Essex) were taken from Vermilion County and added to Kankakee County. The county was named for the Kankakee River.

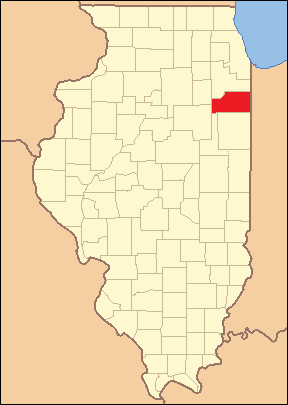
Kankakee County at the time of its creation in 1853

== Geography ==
According to the U.S. Census Bureau, the county has a total area of 681 square miles (1,760 km^{2}), of which 677 square miles (1,750 km^{2}) (99.3%) is land and 4.8 square miles (12 km^{2}) (0.7%) is water.

=== Climate and weather ===
Kankakee, Illinois

Climate chart (precipitation, max. and min. temperature)
J	F	M	A	M	J	J	A	S	O	N	D
1.8 31 12	1.6 37 17	2.8 48 28	3.8 61 38	4.5 73 49	4.4 83 59	4.4 86 63	3.1 84 61	3.5 78 52	2.7 65 40	3.4 50 30	2.6 36 19
- █ Average max. and min. temperatures in °F
- █ Precipitation totals in inches
- Source: The Weather Channel
Metric conversion
J	F	M	A	M	J	J	A	S	O	N	D
45 −1 −11	41 3 −8	71 9 −2	97 16 3	115 23 9	113 28 15	111 30 17	79 29 16	88 26 11	69 18 4	85 10 −1	66 2 −7
- █ Average max. and min. temperatures in °C
- █ Precipitation totals in mm

In recent years, average temperatures in the county seat of Kankakee have ranged from a low of 12 °F (−11 °C) in January to a high of 86 °F (30 °C) in July, although a record low of −29 °F (−34 °C) was recorded in January 1985 and a record high of 107 °F (42 °C) was recorded in August 1988. Average monthly precipitation ranged from 1.62 inches (41 mm) in February to 4.54 inches (115 mm) in May.

=== Adjacent counties ===
- Will County – north
- Lake County, Indiana – northeast
- Newton County, Indiana – east
- Iroquois County – south
- Ford County – southwest
- Livingston County – west
- Grundy County – northwest

== Demographics ==
Historical population
Census	Pop.	Note	%±
1860	15,412		—
1870	24,352		58.0%
1880	25,047		2.9%
1890	28,732		14.7%
1900	37,154		29.3%
1910	40,752		9.7%
1920	44,940		10.3%
1930	50,095		11.5%
1940	60,877		21.5%
1950	73,524		20.8%
1960	92,063		25.2%
1970	97,250		5.6%
1980	102,926		5.8%
1990	96,255		−6.5%
2000	103,833		7.9%
2010	113,449		9.3%
2020	107,502		−5.2%
2025 (est.)	105,525	▼	−1.8%
U.S. Decennial Census; 1790-1960 1900-1990; 1990-2000 2010

2000 census age pyramid for Kankakee County

=== 2020 census ===
As of the 2020 census, the county had a population of 107,502. The median age was 39.6 years. 22.8% of residents were under the age of 18 and 17.6% of residents were 65 years of age or older. For every 100 females there were 96.2 males, and for every 100 females age 18 and over there were 94.1 males age 18 and over.

The racial makeup of the county was 71.0% White, 14.5% Black or African American, 0.4% American Indian and Alaska Native, 1.0% Asian, <0.1% Native Hawaiian and Pacific Islander, 5.8% from some other race, and 7.2% from two or more races. Hispanic or Latino residents of any race comprised 11.6% of the population.

71.6% of residents lived in urban areas, while 28.4% lived in rural areas.

There were 41,528 households in the county, of which 30.6% had children under the age of 18 living in them. Of all households, 45.4% were married-couple households, 18.5% were households with a male householder and no spouse or partner present, and 28.5% were households with a female householder and no spouse or partner present. About 28.0% of all households were made up of individuals and 12.5% had someone living alone who was 65 years of age or older.

There were 45,270 housing units, of which 8.3% were vacant. Among occupied housing units, 68.0% were owner-occupied and 32.0% were renter-occupied. The homeowner vacancy rate was 2.0% and the rental vacancy rate was 8.9%.

=== Racial and ethnic composition ===
Kankakee County, Illinois – Racial and ethnic composition Note: the US Census treats Hispanic/Latino as an ethnic category. This table excludes Latinos from the racial categories and assigns them to a separate category. Hispanics/Latinos may be of any race.
Race / Ethnicity (NH = Non-Hispanic)	Pop 1980	Pop 1990	Pop 2000	Pop 2010	Pop 2020	% 1980	% 1990	% 2000	% 2010	% 2020
White alone (NH)	86,036	79,208	80,829	83,218	73,591	83.59%	82.29%	77.85%	73.35%	68.46%
Black or African American alone (NH)	14,836	14,293	15,942	16,998	15,417	14.41%	14.85%	15.35%	14.98%	14.34%
Native American or Alaska Native alone (NH)	154	140	145	187	173	0.15%	0.15%	0.14%	0.16%	0.16%
Asian alone (NH)	399	618	699	1,030	1,069	0.39%	0.64%	0.67%	0.91%	0.99%
Native Hawaiian or Pacific Islander alone (NH)	x	x	15	32	13	x	x	0.01%	0.03%	0.01%
Other race alone (NH)	249	50	119	103	372	0.24%	0.05%	0.11%	0.09%	0.35%
Mixed race or Multiracial (NH)	x	x	1,125	1,714	4,347	x	x	1.08%	1.51%	4.04%
Hispanic or Latino (any race)	1,252	1,946	4,959	10,167	12,520	1.22%	2.02%	4.78%	8.96%	11.65%
Total	102,926	96,255	103,833	113,449	107,502	100.00%	100.00%	100.00%	100.00%	100.00%

=== 2010 census ===
As of the 2010 United States census, there were 113,449 people, 41,511 households, and 28,680 families residing in the county. The population density was 167.7 inhabitants per square mile (64.7/km^{2}). There were 45,246 housing units at an average density of 66.9 per square mile (25.8/km^{2}). The racial makeup of the county was 77.6% white, 15.1% black or African American, 0.9% Asian, 0.3% Native American, 4.0% from other races, and 2.1% from two or more races. Those of Hispanic or Latino origin made up 9.0% of the population. In terms of ancestry, 26.5% were German, 14.2% were Irish, 7.4% were English, 6.7% were Italian, 5.8% were Polish, and 3.6% were American.

Of the 41,511 households, 35.2% had children under the age of 18 living with them, 49.1% were married couples living together, 14.7% had a female householder with no husband present, 30.9% were non-families, and 25.5% of all households were made up of individuals. The average household size was 2.61 and the average family size was 3.13. The median age was 36.7 years.

The median income for a household in the county was $50,484 and the median income for a family was $59,998. Males had a median income of $49,858 versus $32,247 for females. The per capita income for the county was $22,888. About 10.8% of families and 15.0% of the population were below the poverty line, including 20.6% of those under age 18 and 8.4% of those age 65 or over.

== Communities ==
=== Cities ===
- Kankakee
- Momence

=== Villages ===
- Aroma Park
- Bonfield
- Bourbonnais
- Bradley
- Buckingham
- Chebanse
- Essex
- Grant Park
- Herscher
- Hopkins Park
- Irwin
- Limestone
- Manteno
- Reddick
- Sammons Point
- St. Anne
- Sun River Terrace
- Union Hill

=== Unincorporated communities ===
- Altorf
- Deselm
- Garden of Eden
- Goodrich
- Greenwich
- Illiana Heights
- Indian Oaks
- Leesville
- Lehigh
- Saint George
- Sherburnville
- Sollitt
- Sugar Island
- Whitaker
- Wichert

=== Townships ===
Kankakee County is divided into seventeen townships:

- Aroma
- Bourbonnais
- Essex
- Ganeer
- Kankakee
- Limestone
- Manteno
- Momence
- Norton
- Otto
- Pembroke
- Pilot
- Rockville
- St. Anne
- Salina
- Sumner
- Yellowhead

== Politics ==
United States presidential election results for Kankakee County, Illinois
Year	Republican		Democratic		Third party(ies)	
Year	No.	%	No.	%	No.	%
1892	3,577	54.42%	2,763	42.04%	233	3.54%
1896	5,471	68.20%	2,370	29.54%	181	2.26%
1900	5,798	67.44%	2,674	31.10%	125	1.45%
1904	6,162	74.93%	1,652	20.09%	410	4.99%
1908	5,999	68.46%	2,461	28.08%	303	3.46%
1912	3,178	36.41%	2,532	29.01%	3,018	34.58%
1916	10,594	62.28%	6,096	35.84%	319	1.88%
1920	12,853	79.33%	2,828	17.46%	520	3.21%
1924	12,462	67.47%	2,488	13.47%	3,521	19.06%
1928	11,905	53.44%	10,247	45.99%	127	0.57%
1932	10,873	43.86%	13,555	54.67%	364	1.47%
1936	10,935	41.21%	13,162	49.60%	2,441	9.20%
1940	15,998	53.62%	13,716	45.97%	124	0.42%
1944	15,256	57.16%	11,342	42.50%	90	0.34%
1948	15,699	57.71%	11,305	41.56%	197	0.72%
1952	20,279	61.44%	12,636	38.29%	90	0.27%
1956	21,993	66.39%	11,088	33.47%	47	0.14%
1960	20,311	54.23%	17,115	45.70%	26	0.07%
1964	16,082	43.61%	20,792	56.39%	0	0.00%
1968	20,025	52.35%	14,460	37.80%	3,765	9.84%
1972	26,866	66.54%	13,434	33.27%	73	0.18%
1976	23,003	54.63%	18,394	43.68%	711	1.69%
1980	23,810	58.25%	14,626	35.78%	2,437	5.96%
1984	23,807	60.02%	15,246	38.44%	612	1.54%
1988	20,316	56.82%	15,147	42.36%	292	0.82%
1992	15,411	38.46%	17,229	43.00%	7,431	18.54%
1996	14,595	41.41%	16,820	47.73%	3,826	10.86%
2000	20,049	49.89%	19,180	47.73%	954	2.37%
2004	24,739	54.93%	20,003	44.42%	294	0.65%
2008	22,527	46.80%	24,750	51.41%	861	1.79%
2012	23,136	50.68%	21,595	47.30%	923	2.02%
2016	25,129	53.12%	18,971	40.10%	3,205	6.78%
2020	28,532	57.02%	20,271	40.51%	1,237	2.47%
2024	28,285	59.19%	18,399	38.50%	1,101	2.30%

Kankakee County is currently considered a Republican-leaning county. Since 2000, it has been carried by the Republican Party nominee in each election except for 2008, when it voted 51 percent in favor of Illinois resident Barack Obama of the Democratic Party. In 2024 it was carried by Republican Donald Trump by more than 20 percentage points.

Kankakee County is split between Illinois's 2nd congressional district, represented by Democrat Robin Kelly (D-Matteson), and Illinois's 1st congressional district, represented by Jonathan Jackson (D-Chicago). Kankakee County has produced three governors: Len Small (R), Samuel H. Shapiro (D), and George H. Ryan (R).

In December 2016, Kankakee County became the only county in Illinois to have a Libertarian county board member when Jim Byrne of Bradley left the Republican Party to join the Libertarian Party. In the 2020 general election, Byrne lost reelection to Democratic candidate Heather Bryan, while Libertarian Jacob Collins was elected unopposed on the Libertarian line continuing Kankakee County's distinction of being the only county with a Libertarian board member until Collins opted not to run for reelection in the 2022 general election.

== Education ==
The county is home to Olivet Nazarene University and Kankakee Community College.

== Transportation ==
Kankakee County is served by the Greater Kankakee Airport. Amtrak runs train service through the city via Kankakee station. The station serves the Illini and Saluki trains to Carbondale as well as the City of New Orleans. The city of Kankakee has local public transit service provided by the River Valley Metro Mass Transit District. Momence and rural Kankakee county are served by SHOW Bus.

=== Major highways ===
- Interstate 57
- U.S. Highway 45
- U.S. Highway 52
- Illinois Route 1
- Illinois Route 17
- Illinois Route 50
- Illinois Route 102
- Illinois Route 113
- Illinois Route 114
- Illinois Route 115

== See also ==
- National Register of Historic Places listings in Kankakee County, Illinois
