= Onarga =

Onarga is the name of a village and a township in the United States:

- Onarga, Illinois
- Onarga Township, Iroquois County, Illinois
