= Ash Grove Township =

Ash Grove Township may refer to:

- Ash Grove Township, Iroquois County, Illinois
- Ash Grove Township, Shelby County, Illinois
- Ash Grove Township, Franklin County, Nebraska

== See also ==
- Ash Grove (disambiguation)
