= Ash Grove Township, Illinois =

Ash Grove Township, Illinois refers to one of the following places:

- Ash Grove Township, Iroquois County, Illinois
- Ash Grove Township, Shelby County, Illinois

See also

- Ash Grove Township (disambiguation)
