= Claytonville, Illinois =

- Unincorporated community
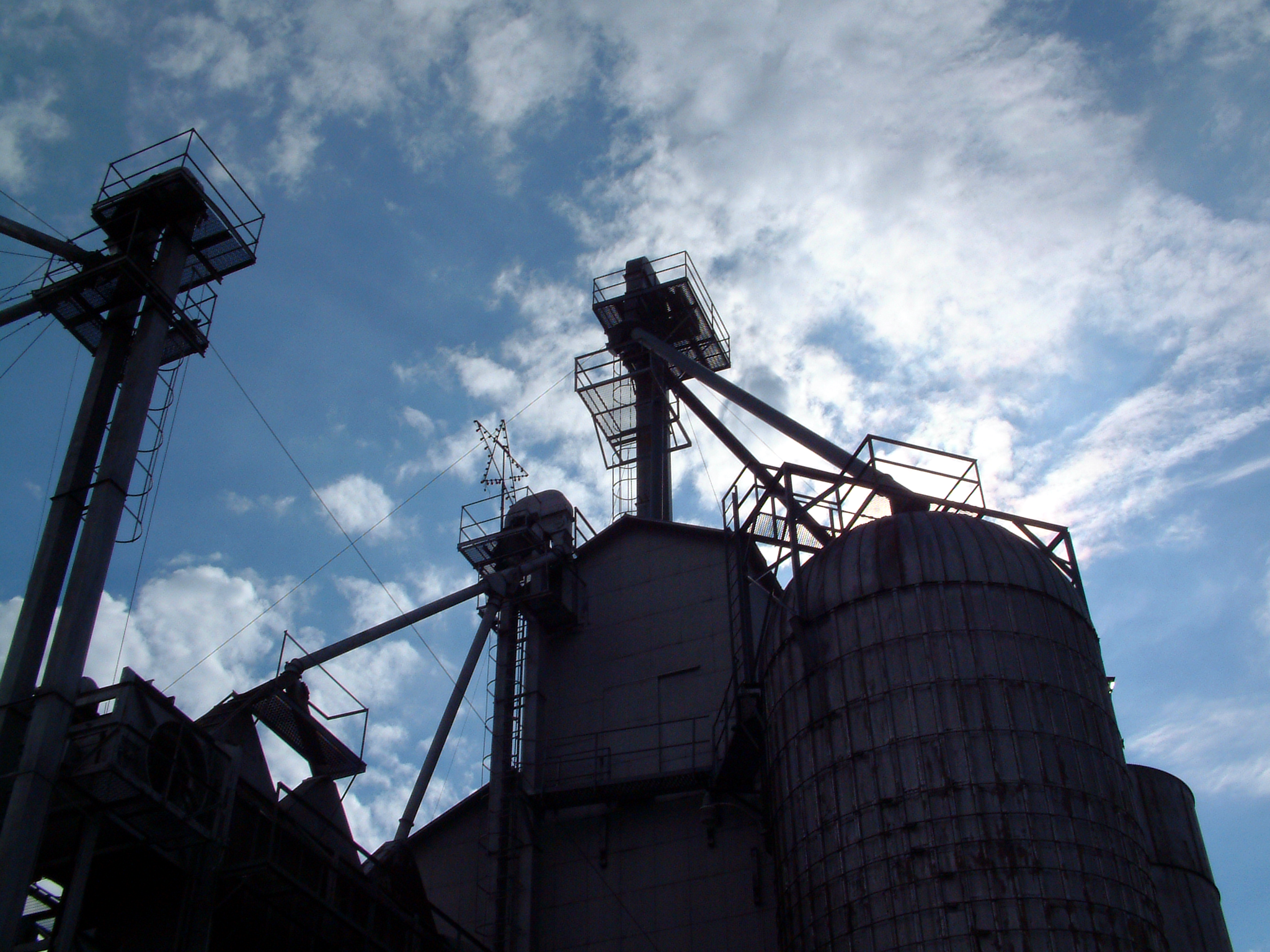
- Grain elevators at Claytonville

- Iroquois County's location in Illinois

- Location within Iroquois County, Illinois
- Coordinates: 40°34′01″N 87°49′23″W
- Country: United States
- State: Illinois
- County: Iroquois County
- Township: Fountain Creek Township
- Elevation: 659 ft (201 m)
- Time zone: Central Standard Time
- ZIP code: 60926
- Area code: 815
- GNIS feature ID: 0406197

Claytonville is an unincorporated community in Iroquois County, Illinois, United States.

== Geography ==
Claytonville is located at 40°34′01″N 87°49′20″W (40.566944, -87.822222), a little under four miles east of the town of Cissna Park and about two miles west of Goodwine. An east–west line of the Chicago and Eastern Illinois Railroad used to pass through the community but is now defunct.

The small waterway: Whiskey Creek runs along the north edge of town, flowing east to meet with Fountain Creek north of Goodwine.
