= Stockland (disambiguation) =

Stockland may refer to:

- Stockland, a multinational company.
- Stockland, Devon, a small village in Devon, UK.
- Stockland Bristol, a village in Somerset, UK.
- Stockland, Illinois, an unincorporated community in Illinois, USA.
