= Danforth Township =

Danforth Township may refer to the following townships in the United States:

- Danforth Township, Iroquois County, Illinois
- Danforth Township, Pine County, Minnesota
