= Herman Smith =

Herman Smith is the name of:

- Herman Smith (gridiron football) (born 1971), American former gridiron football player
- Herman L. Smith (1892–1950), American mathematician
- Herman Smith, real name of the Wizard of Oz in The Wiz
- Herman Smith, namesake of the Smith-Harris House
- Red Smith (coach), (1906–1959), American football, baseball, and track coach

== See also ==
- Herman Smith-Johannsen (1875–1987), supercentarian
