= Thawville, Illinois =

- Village
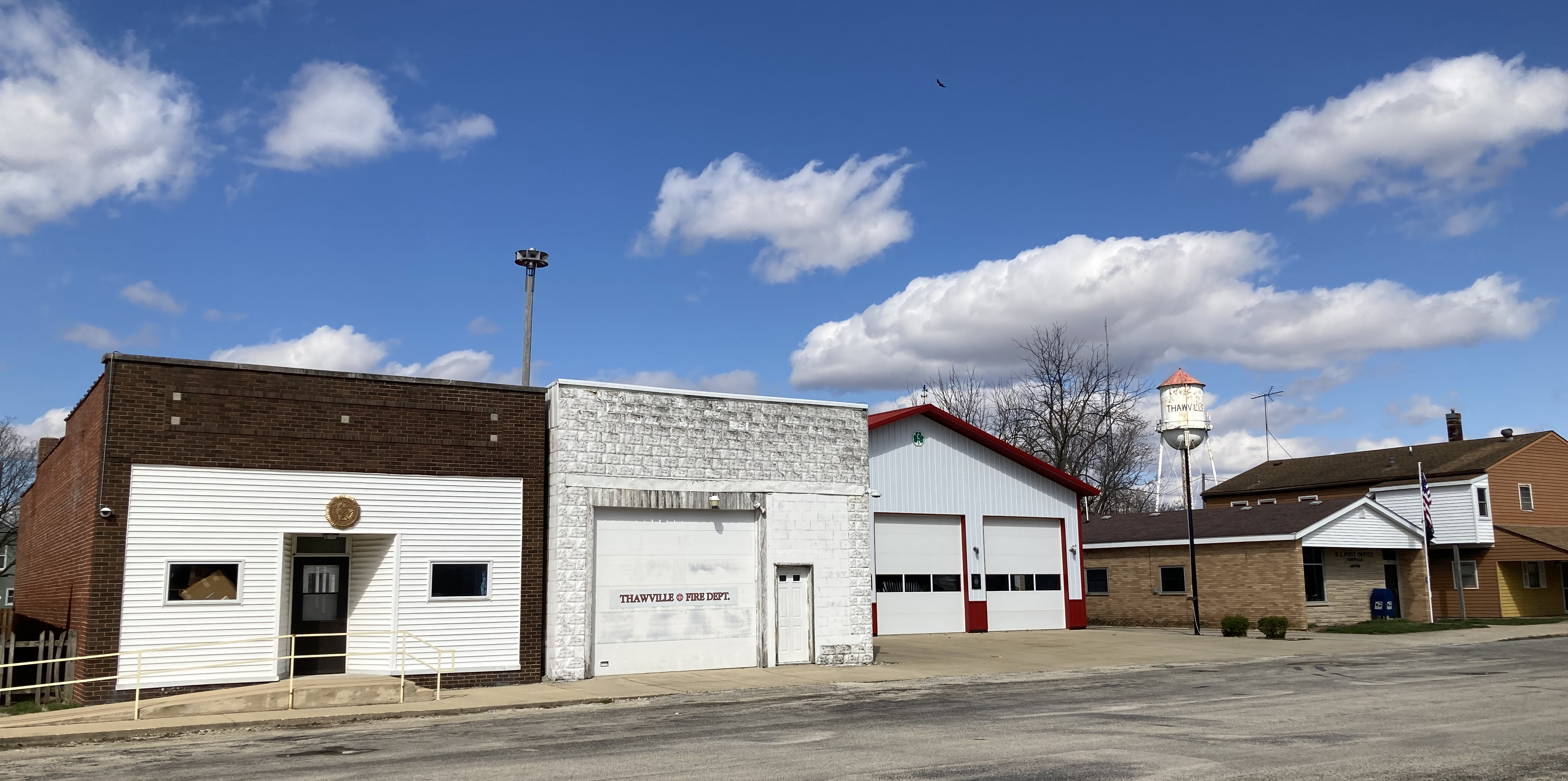
- American Legion hall, fire department, and post office

- Location in Iroquois County, Illinois

- Location in Iroquois County
- Coordinates: 40°40′23″N 88°06′49″W
- Country: United States
- State: Illinois
- County: Iroquois
- Township: Ridgeland

Area
  - Total: 0.31 sq mi (0.79 km^{2})
  - Land: 0.31 sq mi (0.79 km^{2})
  - Water: 0 sq mi (0.00 km^{2})
- Elevation: 689 ft (210 m)

Population (2020)
  - Total: 215
  - Density: 700.5/sq mi (270.45/km^{2})
- Time zone: UTC-6 (CST)
  - Summer (DST): UTC-5 (CDT)
- ZIP code: 60968
- Area code: 217
- FIPS code: 17-74847
- GNIS feature ID: 2399963

Thawville is a village in Ridgeland Township, Iroquois County, Illinois, United States. The population was 215 at the 2020 census.

Thawville is named after Pittsburgh railroad magnate William Thaw Sr., who visited the town only once.

== Geography ==
Thawville is located in western Iroquois County. Illinois Route 54 passes through the southeast side of the village, leading northeast 6 miles (10 km) to Onarga and southwest the same distance to Roberts.

According to the 2021 census gazetteer files, Thawville has a total area of 0.31 square miles (0.80 km^{2}), all land.

== Demographics ==
Historical population
Census	Pop.	Note	%±
1910	318		—
1920	318		0.0%
1930	242		−23.9%
1940	293		21.1%
1950	267		−8.9%
1960	246		−7.9%
1970	271		10.2%
1980	275		1.5%
1990	241		−12.4%
2000	258		7.1%
2010	241		−6.6%
2020	215		−10.8%
U.S. Decennial Census

As of the 2020 census there were 215 people, 93 households, and 42 families residing in the village. The population density was 700.33 inhabitants per square mile (270.40/km^{2}). There were 106 housing units at an average density of 345.28 per square mile (133.31/km^{2}). The racial makeup of the village was 80.93% White, 1.40% African American, 0.00% Native American, 0.00% Asian, 0.00% Pacific Islander, 8.84% from other races, and 8.84% from two or more races. Hispanic or Latino of any race were 19.07% of the population.

There were 93 households, out of which 36.6% had children under the age of 18 living with them, 31.18% were married couples living together, 13.98% had a female householder with no husband present, and 54.84% were non-families. 33.33% of all households were made up of individuals, and 29.03% had someone living alone who was 65 years of age or older. The average household size was 3.55 and the average family size was 2.42.

The village's age distribution consisted of 35.1% under the age of 18, 3.6% from 18 to 24, 21.8% from 25 to 44, 13.5% from 45 to 64, and 26.2% who were 65 years of age or older. The median age was 35.6 years. For every 100 females, there were 86.0 males. For every 100 females age 18 and over, there were 82.5 males.

The median income for a household in the village was $36,250, and the median income for a family was $44,167. Males had a median income of $28,214 versus $25,179 for females. The per capita income for the village was $14,974. About 11.9% of families and 24.9% of the population were below the poverty line, including 26.8% of those under age 18 and 22.0% of those age 65 or over.
