= Prairie Green =

Prairie Green can refer to:

- Prairie Green Township, Iroquois County, Illinois
- Green Prairie Township, Minnesota
