= Iroquois, Illinois =

- Village
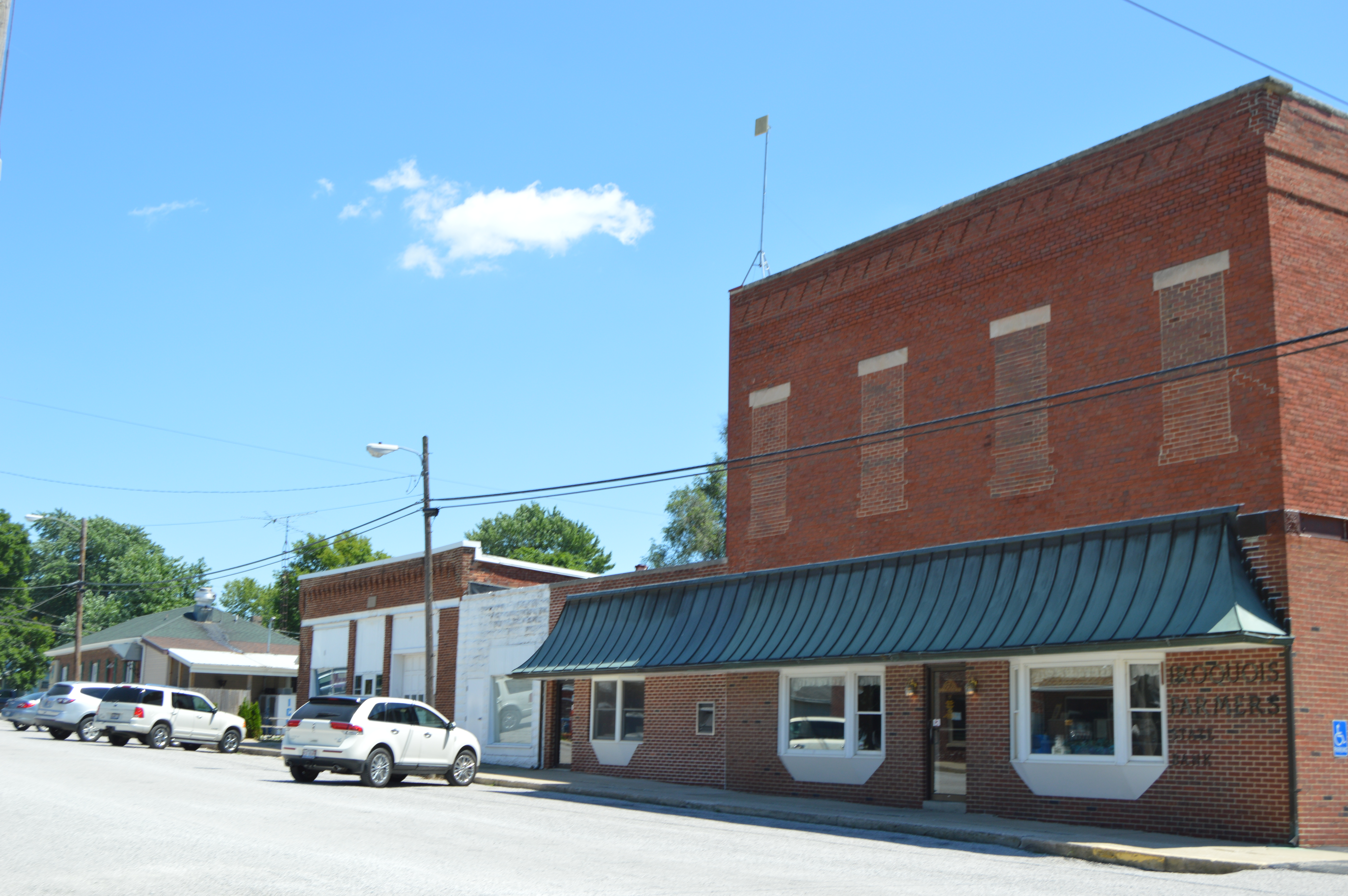
- Lincoln Avenue in Iroquois

- Location in Iroquois County, Illinois

- Location in Iroquois County
- Coordinates: 40°49′44″N 87°35′03″W
- Country: United States
- State: Illinois
- County: Iroquois
- Township: Concord

Area
  - Total: 0.57 sq mi (1.47 km^{2})
  - Land: 0.57 sq mi (1.47 km^{2})
  - Water: 0 sq mi (0.00 km^{2})
- Elevation: 666 ft (203 m)

Population (2020)
  - Total: 133
  - Density: 234.6/sq mi (90.59/km^{2})
- Time zone: UTC-6 (CST)
  - Summer (DST): UTC-5 (CDT)
- ZIP code: 60945
- Area code: 815
- FIPS code: 17-37712
- GNIS feature ID: 2398275

Iroquois is a village in Concord Township, Iroquois County, Illinois, United States, along the Iroquois River. The population was 133 as of the 2020 census.

== Geography ==
Iroquois is located in eastern Iroquois County on the north side of the Iroquois River, a west-flowing tributary of the Kankakee River and part of the Illinois River watershed.

U.S. Route 52 passes through the village, leading south 4 miles (6 km) to Sheldon and northwest the same distance to Donovan. The Indiana border is 3 miles (5 km) to the east via County Highway 31.

According to the 2021 census gazetteer files, Iroquois has a total area of 0.57 square miles (1.48 km^{2}), all land.

== Demographics ==
Historical population
Census	Pop.	Note	%±
1890	393		—
1900	427		8.7%
1910	286		−33.0%
1920	276		−3.5%
1930	231		−16.3%
1940	242		4.8%
1950	232		−4.1%
1960	231		−0.4%
1970	226		−2.2%
1980	227		0.4%
1990	199		−12.3%
2000	207		4.0%
2010	154		−25.6%
2020	133		−13.6%
U.S. Decennial Census

As of the 2020 census there were 133 people, 113 households, and 74 families residing in the village. The population density was 234.57 inhabitants per square mile (90.57/km^{2}). There were 81 housing units at an average density of 142.86 per square mile (55.16/km^{2}). The racial makeup of the village was 93.98% White, 0.00% African American, 0.00% Native American, 0.00% Asian, 0.00% Pacific Islander, 1.50% from other races, and 4.51% from two or more races. Hispanic or Latino of any race were 2.26% of the population.

There were 113 households, out of which 38.9% had children under the age of 18 living with them, 27.43% were married couples living together, 8.85% had a female householder with no husband present, and 34.51% were non-families. 28.32% of all households were made up of individuals, and 8.85% had someone living alone who was 65 years of age or older. The average household size was 2.95 and the average family size was 2.54.

The village's age distribution consisted of 35.5% under the age of 18, 3.5% from 18 to 24, 16.8% from 25 to 44, 27.5% from 45 to 64, and 16.7% who were 65 years of age or older. The median age was 38.3 years. For every 100 females, there were 65.9 males. For every 100 females age 18 and over, there were 128.4 males.

The median income for a household in the village was $61,964, and the median income for a family was $81,964. Males had a median income of $80,446 versus $21,875 for females. The per capita income for the village was $25,151. About 10.8% of families and 14.6% of the population were below the poverty line, including 8.8% of those under age 18 and 4.2% of those age 65 or over.
