= Ridgeland Township, Iroquois County, Illinois =

Ridgeland Township
- Township
- Location in Iroquois County

- Iroquois County's location in Illinois
- Coordinates: 40°42′01″N 88°05′04″W
- Country: United States
- State: Illinois
- County: Iroquois
- Established: January 29, 1879

Area
  - Total: 27.01 sq mi (70.0 km^{2})
  - Land: 27.00 sq mi (69.9 km^{2})
  - Water: 0.01 sq mi (0.026 km^{2}) 0.02%
- Elevation: 666 ft (203 m)

Population (2020)
  - Total: 328
  - Density: 12.1/sq mi (4.69/km^{2})
- Time zone: UTC-6 (CST)
  - Summer (DST): UTC-5 (CDT)
- ZIP codes: 60955, 60968
- FIPS code: 17-075-63901

Ridgeland Township is one of twenty-six townships in Iroquois County, Illinois, USA. As of the 2020 census, its population was 328 and it contained 164 housing units. Ridgeland Township was formed from Onarga Township on January 29, 1879; the original name was Ridge Township, but the name was changed to Ridgeland Township on an unknown date.

== Geography ==
According to the 2021 census gazetteer files, Ridgeland Township has a total area of 27.01 square miles (69.96 km^{2}), of which 27.00 square miles (69.93 km^{2}) (or 99.98%) is land and 0.01 square miles (0.03 km^{2}) (or 0.02%) is water.

=== Cities, towns, villages ===
- Thawville

=== Unincorporated towns ===
- Ridgeville at 40.713646°N 88.06782°W

(This list is based on USGS data and may include former settlements.)

=== Cemeteries ===
The township contains Thawville Cemetery.

=== Major highways ===
- Interstate 57
- Illinois Route 54

== Demographics ==
As of the 2020 census there were 328 people, 122 households, and 56 families residing in the township. The population density was 12.14 inhabitants per square mile (4.69/km^{2}). There were 164 housing units at an average density of 6.07 per square mile (2.34/km^{2}). The racial makeup of the township was 85.67% White, 0.91% African American, 0.00% Native American, 0.00% Asian, 0.00% Pacific Islander, 6.10% from other races, and 7.32% from two or more races. Hispanic or Latino of any race were 14.94% of the population.

There were 122 households, out of which 27.90% had children under the age of 18 living with them, 35.25% were married couples living together, 10.66% had a female householder with no spouse present, and 54.10% were non-families. 37.70% of all households were made up of individuals, and 22.10% had someone living alone who was 65 years of age or older. The average household size was 2.19 and the average family size was 3.14.

The township's age distribution consisted of 29.6% under the age of 18, 3.0% from 18 to 24, 18.3% from 25 to 44, 22.1% from 45 to 64, and 27.0% who were 65 years of age or older. The median age was 44.7 years. For every 100 females, there were 99.3 males. For every 100 females age 18 and over, there were 102.2 males.

The median income for a household in the township was $43,333, and the median income for a family was $51,667. Males had a median income of $50,833 versus $25,179 for females. The per capita income for the township was $28,405. About 8.9% of families and 20.8% of the population were below the poverty line, including 26.8% of those under age 18 and 18.1% of those age 65 or over.

Historical population
Census	Pop.	Note	%±
2000	393		—
2010	369		−6.1%
2020	328		−11.1%
U.S. Decennial Census

== School districts ==
- Iroquois West Community Unit School District 10
- Paxton-Buckley-Loda Community Unit School District 10

== Political districts ==
- Illinois' 15th congressional district
- State House District 105
- State Senate District 53
