= Artesia Township, Iroquois County, Illinois =

Artesia Township
- Township
- Location in Iroquois County

- Iroquois County's location in Illinois
- Coordinates: 40°36′26″N 88°01′03″W
- Country: United States
- State: Illinois
- County: Iroquois
- Established: Before 1921

Area
  - Total: 57.42 sq mi (148.7 km^{2})
  - Land: 57.37 sq mi (148.6 km^{2})
  - Water: 0.05 sq mi (0.13 km^{2}) 0.09%
- Elevation: 682 ft (208 m)

Population (2020)
  - Total: 854
  - Density: 14.9/sq mi (5.75/km^{2})
- Time zone: UTC-6 (CST)
  - Summer (DST): UTC-5 (CDT)
- ZIP codes: 60918, 60924, 60955, 60968
- FIPS code: 17-075-02401

Artesia Township is one of twenty-six townships in Iroquois County, Illinois, United States. As of the 2020 census, its population was 854 and it contained 402 housing units. Artesia Township formed from portions of Ash Grove and Loda townships sometime prior to 1921.

== Geography ==
According to the 2021 census gazetteer files, Artesia Township has a total area of 57.42 square miles (148.72 km^{2}), of which 57.37 square miles (148.59 km^{2}) (or 99.91%) is land and 0.05 square miles (0.13 km^{2}) (or 0.09%) is water.

=== Cities, towns, villages ===
- Buckley

=== Cemeteries ===
The township contains these two cemeteries: Lisk and Saint John's Lutheran.

=== Major highways ===
- Interstate 57
- U.S. Route 45

== Demographics ==
As of the 2020 census there were 854 people, 341 households, and 257 families residing in the township. The population density was 14.87 inhabitants per square mile (5.74/km^{2}). There were 402 housing units at an average density of 7.00 per square mile (2.70/km^{2}). The racial makeup of the township was 92.39% White, 1.05% African American, 0.35% Native American, 0.47% Asian, 0.00% Pacific Islander, 0.35% from other races, and 5.39% from two or more races. Hispanic or Latino of any race were 3.28% of the population.

There were 341 households, out of which 28.20% had children under the age of 18 living with them, 63.93% were married couples living together, 2.64% had a female householder with no spouse present, and 24.63% were non-families. 24.00% of all households were made up of individuals, and 13.50% had someone living alone who was 65 years of age or older. The average household size was 2.16 and the average family size was 2.47.

The township's age distribution consisted of 21.2% under the age of 18, 2.2% from 18 to 24, 20.3% from 25 to 44, 36% from 45 to 64, and 20.2% who were 65 years of age or older. The median age was 51.7 years. For every 100 females, there were 112.7 males. For every 100 females age 18 and over, there were 118.9 males.

The median income for a household in the township was $67,750, and the median income for a family was $89,028. Males had a median income of $50,000 versus $31,458 for females. The per capita income for the township was $32,107. About 0.8% of families and 4.9% of the population were below the poverty line, including 1.9% of those under age 18 and 1.3% of those age 65 or over.

Historical population
Census	Pop.	Note	%±
2000	1,076		—
2010	945		−12.2%
2020	854		−9.6%
U.S. Decennial Census

== School districts ==
- Cissna Park Community Unit School District 6
- Iroquois West Community Unit School District 10
- Paxton-Buckley-Loda Community Unit School District 10

== Political districts ==
- Illinois' 15th congressional district
- State House District 105
- State Senate District 53
