= Woodland, Illinois =

- Village
- Location in Iroquois County, Illinois

- Location in Iroquois County
- Coordinates: 40°42′54″N 87°43′52″W
- Country: United States
- State: Illinois
- County: Iroquois
- Township: Belmont

Area
  - Total: 0.49 sq mi (1.27 km^{2})
  - Land: 0.49 sq mi (1.27 km^{2})
  - Water: 0 sq mi (0.00 km^{2})
- Elevation: 640 ft (200 m)

Population (2020)
  - Total: 248
  - Density: 506/sq mi (195.5/km^{2})
- Time zone: UTC-6 (CST)
  - Summer (DST): UTC-5 (CDT)
- ZIP code: 60974
- Area code: 815
- FIPS code: 17-83102
- GNIS feature ID: 2399732
- Website: woodlandillinois.com

Woodland is a village in Belmont Township, Iroquois County, Illinois, United States. The population was 248 as of the 2020 census.

== Geography ==
Woodland is located in east-central Iroquois County 7 miles south of Watseka, the county seat.

According to the 2021 census gazetteer files, Woodland has a total area of 0.49 square miles (1.27 km^{2}), all land. Sugar Creek, a tributary of the Iroquois River, flows northward past the western side of the village.

== Demographics ==
Historical population
Census	Pop.	Note	%±
1900	331		—
1910	295		−10.9%
1920	398		34.9%
1930	304		−23.6%
1940	334		9.9%
1950	334		0.0%
1960	344		3.0%
1970	350		1.7%
1980	333		−4.9%
1990	313		−6.0%
2000	319		1.9%
2010	324		1.6%
2020	248		−23.5%
U.S. Decennial Census

As of the 2020 census there were 248 people, 118 households, and 85 families residing in the village. The population density was 506.12 inhabitants per square mile (195.41/km^{2}). There were 112 housing units at an average density of 228.57 per square mile (88.25/km^{2}). The racial makeup of the village was 95.56% White, 0.81% African American, 0.00% Native American, 0.00% Asian, 0.00% Pacific Islander, 0.40% from other races, and 3.23% from two or more races. Hispanic or Latino of any race were 1.61% of the population.

There were 118 households, out of which 37.3% had children under the age of 18 living with them, 53.39% were married couples living together, 11.02% had a female householder with no husband present, and 27.97% were non-families. 13.56% of all households were made up of individuals, and 5.93% had someone living alone who was 65 years of age or older. The average household size was 3.00 and the average family size was 2.86.

The village's age distribution consisted of 29.0% under the age of 18, 3.6% from 18 to 24, 27.8% from 25 to 44, 23.6% from 45 to 64, and 16.0% who were 65 years of age or older. The median age was 36.5 years. For every 100 females, there were 96.5 males. For every 100 females age 18 and over, there were 106.9 males.

The median income for a household in the village was $48,958, and the median income for a family was $42,321. Males had a median income of $35,833 versus $22,750 for females. The per capita income for the village was $18,471. About 12.9% of families and 20.6% of the population were below the poverty line, including 41.9% of those under age 18 and 1.9% of those age 65 or over.

== Notable Buildings ==
The Woodland Post Office, located directly off of main street, handles mail for the entire village.

The Woodland Fire Department, located directly on main street, is a volunteer fire department for the entire village.
