= Fountain Creek Township, Iroquois County, Illinois =

Fountain Creek Township
- Township
- Location in Iroquois County

- Iroquois County's location in Illinois
- Coordinates: 40°32′16″N 87°49′00″W
- Country: United States
- State: Illinois
- County: Iroquois
- Established: September 15, 1868

Area
  - Total: 36.23 sq mi (93.8 km^{2})
  - Land: 36.23 sq mi (93.8 km^{2})
  - Water: 0 sq mi (0 km^{2}) 0%
- Elevation: 669 ft (204 m)

Population (2020)
  - Total: 315
  - Density: 8.69/sq mi (3.36/km^{2})
- Time zone: UTC-6 (CST)
  - Summer (DST): UTC-5 (CDT)
- ZIP codes: 60924, 60926, 60942, 60953, 60960
- FIPS code: 17-075-27286

Fountain Creek Township is one of twenty-six townships in Iroquois County, Illinois, USA. As of the 2020 census, its population was 315 and it contained 135 housing units. Fountain Creek Township formed from a portion of Ash Grove Township on September 15, 1868.

== Geography ==
According to the 2021 census gazetteer files, Fountain Creek Township has a total area of 36.23 square miles (93.84 km^{2}), all land. Nearly all of the township consists of flat, open farmland. Two small waterways, Fountain Creek and Whiskey Creek, flow northeast across the township and meet north of Goodwine.

A Union Pacific rail line connecting Chicago and St. Louis runs northeast-to-southwest through the eastern half of the township, and a branch of the defunct Chicago and Eastern Illinois Railroad crosses it near the northern border.

=== Unincorporated towns ===
- Claytonville at 40.5669804°N 87.8230869°W, half a mile from the northern edge of the township on County Road 1600 East.
- Goodwine at 40.5672584°N 87.7844742°W, two miles east of Claytonville on County Road 1800 East.

(This list is based on USGS data and may include former settlements.)

=== Cemeteries ===
The township contains one cemetery: Old Apostolic, near Fountain Creek.

== Demographics ==
As of the 2020 census there were 315 people, 112 households, and 79 families residing in the township. The population density was 8.70 inhabitants per square mile (3.36/km^{2}). There were 135 housing units at an average density of 3.73 per square mile (1.44/km^{2}). The racial makeup of the township was 90.79% White, 0.63% African American, 0.32% Native American, 0.63% Asian, 0.00% Pacific Islander, 0.32% from other races, and 7.30% from two or more races. Hispanic or Latino of any race were 3.17% of the population.

There were 112 households, out of which 23.20% had children under the age of 18 living with them, 70.54% were married couples living together, 0.00% had a female householder with no spouse present, and 29.46% were non-families. 24.10% of all households were made up of individuals, and 17.90% had someone living alone who was 65 years of age or older. The average household size was 2.35 and the average family size was 2.77.

The township's age distribution consisted of 18.3% under the age of 18, 3.8% from 18 to 24, 19.8% from 25 to 44, 31.1% from 45 to 64, and 27.0% who were 65 years of age or older. The median age was 46.7 years. For every 100 females, there were 94.8 males. For every 100 females age 18 and over, there were 128.7 males.

The median income for a household in the township was $78,542, and the median income for a family was $105,208. Males had a median income of $49,167 versus $19,559 for females. The per capita income for the township was $35,519. No families and 6.5% of the population were below the poverty line, including none of those under age 18 and 21.1% of those age 65 or over.

Historical population
Census	Pop.	Note	%±
2000	449		—
2010	368		−18.0%
2020	315		−14.4%
U.S. Decennial Census

== School districts ==
- Cissna Park Community Unit School District 6
- Hoopeston Area Community Unit School District 11
- Milford Area Public Schools #124

== Political districts ==
- Illinois' 15th congressional district
- State House District 105
- State Senate District 53
