= Concord Township, Iroquois County, Illinois =

Concord Township
- Township
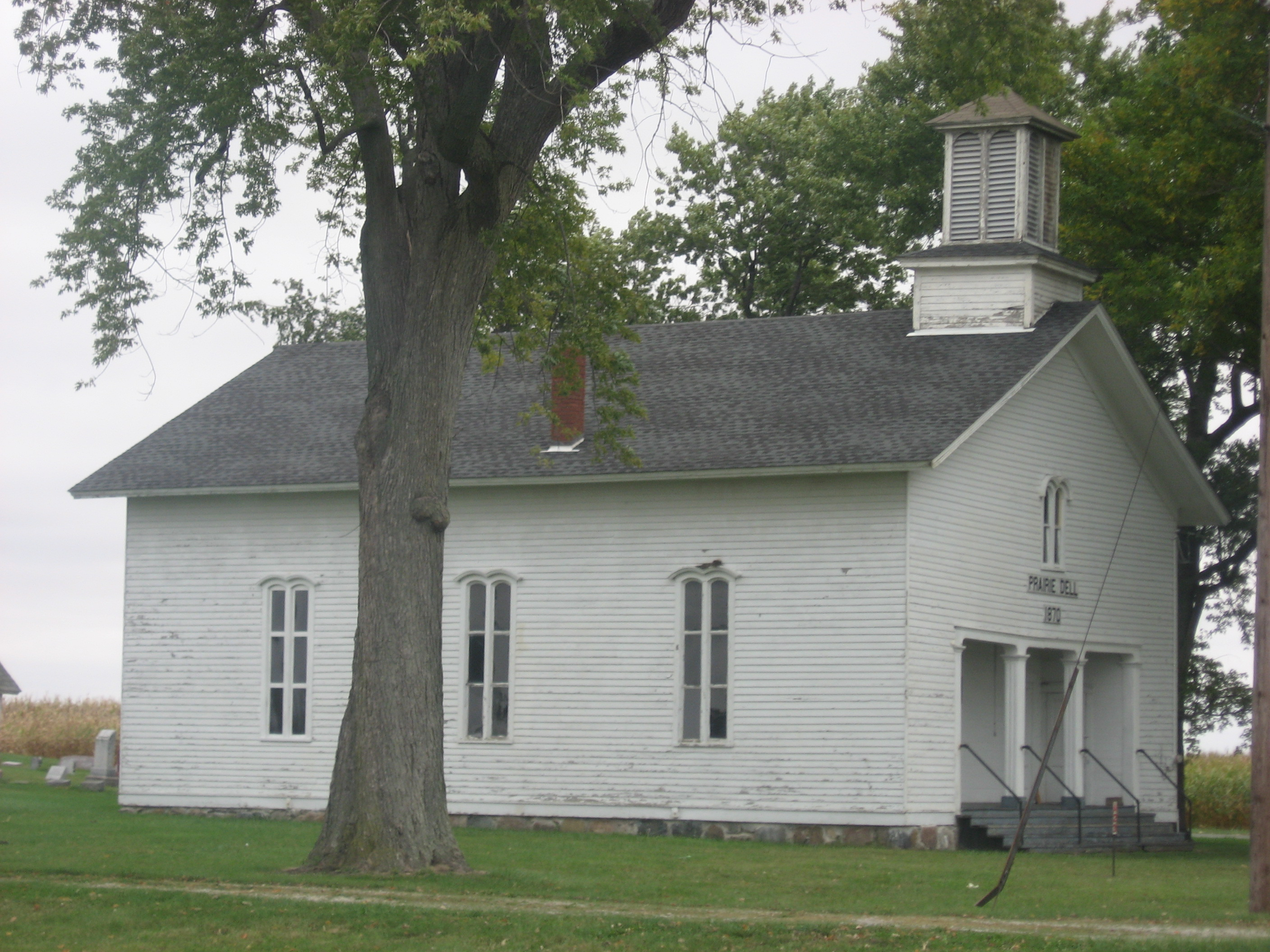
- Prairie Dell Meetinghouse, a historic site in the township's west

- Location in Iroquois County

- Iroquois County's location in Illinois
- Coordinates: 40°49′00″N 87°35′19″W
- Country: United States
- State: Illinois
- County: Iroquois
- Established: November 6, 1855

Area
  - Total: 40.39 sq mi (104.6 km^{2})
  - Land: 40.39 sq mi (104.6 km^{2})
  - Water: 0 sq mi (0 km^{2}) 0.01%
- Elevation: 643 ft (196 m)

Population (2020)
  - Total: 399
  - Density: 9.88/sq mi (3.81/km^{2})
- Time zone: UTC-6 (CST)
  - Summer (DST): UTC-5 (CDT)
- ZIP codes: 60931, 60945, 60966, 60970
- FIPS code: 17-075-16041

Concord Township is one of twenty-six townships in Iroquois County, Illinois, United States. As of the 2020 census, its population was 399 and it contained 216 housing units.

== Geography ==
According to the 2021 census gazetteer files, Concord Township has a total area of 40.39 square miles (104.61 km^{2}), of which 40.39 square miles (104.61 km^{2}) (or 99.99%) is land and 0.00 square miles (0.00 km^{2}) (or 0.01%) is water.

=== Cities, towns, villages ===
- Iroquois

=== Cemeteries ===
The township contains these five cemeteries: Gaffield, Liberty, Morris Chapel, Old Texas and Prairie Dell.

=== Major highways ===
- U.S. Route 24
- U.S. Route 52

=== Airports and landing strips ===
- Zoomer Field

== Demographics ==
As of the 2020 census there were 399 people, 190 households, and 125 families residing in the township. The population density was 9.88 inhabitants per square mile (3.81/km^{2}). There were 216 housing units at an average density of 5.35 per square mile (2.07/km^{2}). The racial makeup of the township was 90.48% White, 0.25% African American, 0.00% Native American, 0.00% Asian, 0.00% Pacific Islander, 2.26% from other races, and 7.02% from two or more races. Hispanic or Latino of any race were 4.76% of the population.

There were 190 households, out of which 28.40% had children under the age of 18 living with them, 40.00% were married couples living together, 5.26% had a female householder with no spouse present, and 34.21% were non-families. 30.50% of all households were made up of individuals, and 14.20% had someone living alone who was 65 years of age or older. The average household size was 2.33 and the average family size was 2.72.

The township's age distribution consisted of 28.3% under the age of 18, 2.9% from 18 to 24, 19% from 25 to 44, 32.2% from 45 to 64, and 17.6% who were 65 years of age or older. The median age was 41.9 years. For every 100 females, there were 76.1 males. For every 100 females age 18 and over, there were 124.8 males.

The median income for a household in the township was $80,536, and the median income for a family was $83,750. Males had a median income of $66,131 versus $17,042 for females. The per capita income for the township was $31,962. About 6.4% of families and 11.1% of the population were below the poverty line, including 7.2% of those under age 18 and 2.6% of those age 65 or over.

Historical population
Census	Pop.	Note	%±
2000	511		—
2010	466		−8.8%
2020	399		−14.4%
U.S. Decennial Census

== School districts ==
- Donovan Community Unit School District 3

== Political districts ==
- Illinois' 16th congressional district
- State House District 105
- State Senate District 53
