= Beaver Township, Iroquois County, Illinois =

Beaver Township
- Township
- Location in Iroquois County

- Iroquois County's location in Illinois
- Coordinates: 40°54′00″N 87°35′19″W
- Country: United States
- State: Illinois
- County: Iroquois
- Established: November 6, 1855

Area
  - Total: 33.66 sq mi (87.2 km^{2})
  - Land: 33.65 sq mi (87.2 km^{2})
  - Water: 0.01 sq mi (0.026 km^{2}) 0.04%
- Elevation: 673 ft (205 m)

Population (2020)
  - Total: 458
  - Density: 13.6/sq mi (5.26/km^{2})
- Time zone: UTC-6 (CST)
  - Summer (DST): UTC-5 (CDT)
- ZIP codes: 60912, 60931, 60970
- FIPS code: 17-075-04455

Beaver Township is one of twenty-six townships in Iroquois County, Illinois, USA. As of the 2020 census, its population was 458 and it contained 222 housing units.

== Geography ==
According to the 2021 census gazetteer files, Beaver Township has a total area of 33.66 square miles (87.18 km^{2}), of which 33.65 square miles (87.15 km^{2}) (or 99.96%) is land and 0.01 square miles (0.03 km^{2}) (or 0.04%) is water.

=== Cities, towns, villages ===
- Donovan

=== Unincorporated towns ===
- Hooper at 40.935867°N 87.606699°W

(This list is based on USGS data and may include former settlements.)

=== Cemeteries ===
The township contains these two cemeteries: Beaver and J H Grant Memorial.

=== Major highways ===
- U.S. Route 52

=== Airports and landing strips ===
- Loy Airport
- Russell Airport

== Demographics ==
As of the 2020 census there were 458 people, 155 households, and 98 families residing in the township. The population density was 13.61 inhabitants per square mile (5.25/km^{2}). There were 222 housing units at an average density of 6.59 per square mile (2.54/km^{2}). The racial makeup of the township was 96.07% White, 0.00% African American, 0.00% Native American, 0.00% Asian, 0.00% Pacific Islander, 0.22% from other races, and 3.71% from two or more races. Hispanic or Latino of any race were 3.49% of the population.

There were 155 households, out of which 41.90% had children under the age of 18 living with them, 47.10% were married couples living together, 9.03% had a female householder with no spouse present, and 36.77% were non-families. 28.40% of all households were made up of individuals, and 20.60% had someone living alone who was 65 years of age or older. The average household size was 2.81 and the average family size was 3.45.

The township's age distribution consisted of 27.4% under the age of 18, 8.0% from 18 to 24, 21.9% from 25 to 44, 31.8% from 45 to 64, and 11.0% who were 65 years of age or older. The median age was 38.9 years. For every 100 females, there were 111.2 males. For every 100 females age 18 and over, there were 103.9 males.

The median income for a household in the township was $42,250, and the median income for a family was $43,750. Males had a median income of $31,406 versus $32,500 for females. The per capita income for the township was $20,080. About 14.3% of families and 18.0% of the population were below the poverty line, including 8.9% of those under age 18 and 16.7% of those age 65 or over.

Historical population
Census	Pop.	Note	%±
2000	627		—
2010	527		−15.9%
2020	458		−13.1%
U.S. Decennial Census

== School districts ==
- Donovan Community Unit School District 3

== Political districts ==
- Illinois's 15th congressional district
- State House District 79
- State Senate District 40
