= Eastburn, Illinois =

- Unincorporated community
- Iroquois County's location in Illinois

- Eastburn's location in Iroquois County
- Coordinates: 40°46′23″N 87°38′08″W
- Country: United States
- State: Illinois
- County: Iroquois
- Elevation: 686 ft (209 m)
- Time zone: UTC-6 (Central (CST))
  - Summer (DST): UTC-5 (CDT)
- Area codes: 815 & 779
- GNIS feature ID: 422654

Eastburn is an unincorporated community in Iroquois County, in the U.S. state of Illinois.

== History ==
A post office was established at Eastburn in 1891, and remained in operation until 1901. Allen M. Eastburn, the first postmaster, gave the community his name.
