= Belmont Township, Iroquois County, Illinois =

Belmont Township
- Township
- Location in Iroquois County

- Iroquois County's location in Illinois
- Coordinates: 40°43′53″N 87°42′08″W
- Country: United States
- State: Illinois
- County: Iroquois
- Established: November 6, 1855

Area
  - Total: 36.32 sq mi (94.1 km^{2})
  - Land: 36.32 sq mi (94.1 km^{2})
  - Water: 0 sq mi (0 km^{2}) 0%
- Elevation: 650 ft (198 m)

Population (2020)
  - Total: 2,410
  - Density: 66.4/sq mi (25.6/km^{2})
- Time zone: UTC-6 (CST)
  - Summer (DST): UTC-5 (CDT)
- ZIP codes: 60953, 60966, 60970, 60974
- FIPS code: 17-075-05014

Belmont Township is one of twenty-six townships in Iroquois County, Illinois, United States. As of the 2020 census, its population was 2,410 and it contained 1,139 housing units.

== Geography ==
According to the 2021 census gazetteer files, Belmont Township has a total area of 36.32 square miles (94.07 km^{2}), all land.

=== Cities, towns, villages ===
- Watseka (south half)
- Woodland

=== Unincorporated towns ===
- Coaler at 40.747258°N 87.733088°W
- Woodland Junction at 40.697258°N 87.730864°W

(This list is based on USGS data and may include former settlements.)

=== Cemeteries ===
The township contains these four cemeteries: Belmont, Body, Iroquois Memorial Park and Keen.

=== Major highways ===
- Illinois Route 1

=== Airports and landing strips ===
- Newman Landing Strip

=== Landmarks ===
- Legion Park

== Demographics ==
As of the 2020 census there were 2,410 people, 1,094 households, and 725 families residing in the township. The population density was 66.36 inhabitants per square mile (25.62/km^{2}). There were 1,139 housing units at an average density of 31.36 per square mile (12.11/km^{2}). The racial makeup of the township was 91.04% White, 1.58% African American, 0.17% Native American, 0.25% Asian, 0.00% Pacific Islander, 1.62% from other races, and 5.35% from two or more races. Hispanic or Latino of any race were 4.61% of the population.

There were 1,094 households, out of which 20.70% had children under the age of 18 living with them, 58.50% were married couples living together, 6.12% had a female householder with no spouse present, and 33.73% were non-families. 27.30% of all households were made up of individuals, and 17.50% had someone living alone who was 65 years of age or older. The average household size was 2.22 and the average family size was 2.60.

The township's age distribution consisted of 18.3% under the age of 18, 6.7% from 18 to 24, 18.1% from 25 to 44, 34.7% from 45 to 64, and 22.2% who were 65 years of age or older. The median age was 50.8 years. For every 100 females, there were 90.0 males. For every 100 females age 18 and over, there were 94.0 males.

The median income for a household in the township was $67,891, and the median income for a family was $83,789. Males had a median income of $55,000 versus $26,746 for females. The per capita income for the township was $33,098. About 5.7% of families and 10.2% of the population were below the poverty line, including 23.1% of those under age 18 and 3.6% of those age 65 or over.

Historical population
Census	Pop.	Note	%±
2000	2,597		—
2010	2,610		0.5%
2020	2,410		−7.7%
U.S. Decennial Census

== School districts ==
- Iroquois County Community Unit School District 9

== Political districts ==
- Illinois's 15th congressional district
- State House District 105
- State Senate District 53
