= Lovejoy Township, Iroquois County, Illinois =

Lovejoy Township
- Township
- Location in Iroquois County

- Iroquois County's location in Illinois
- Coordinates: 40°32′13″N 87°42′14″W
- Country: United States
- State: Illinois
- County: Iroquois
- Established: February 19, 1868

Area
  - Total: 34.69 sq mi (89.8 km^{2})
  - Land: 34.69 sq mi (89.8 km^{2})
  - Water: 0 sq mi (0 km^{2}) 0%
- Elevation: 692 ft (211 m)

Population (2020)
  - Total: 382
  - Density: 11.0/sq mi (4.25/km^{2})
- Time zone: UTC-6 (CST)
  - Summer (DST): UTC-5 (CDT)
- ZIP codes: 60924, 60942, 60953, 60973
- FIPS code: 17-075-44979

Lovejoy Township is one of twenty-six townships in Iroquois County, Illinois, USA. As of the 2020 census, its population was 382 and it contained 174 housing units. Lovejoy Township was formed from a portion of Milford Township on February 19, 1868.

== Geography ==
According to the 2021 census gazetteer files, Lovejoy Township has a total area of 34.69 square miles (89.85 km^{2}), all land.

=== Cities, towns, villages ===
- Wellington

=== Extinct towns ===
- Alonzo at 40.566703°N 87.731139°W
- Hickman at 40.567536°N 87.764473°W

=== Cemeteries ===
The township contains these two cemeteries: Amity and Floral Hill.

=== Major highways ===
- Illinois Route 1

== Demographics ==
As of the 2020 census there were 382 people, 160 households, and 121 families residing in the township. The population density was 11.01 inhabitants per square mile (4.25/km^{2}). There were 174 housing units at an average density of 5.02 per square mile (1.94/km^{2}). The racial makeup of the township was 95.03% White, 0.00% African American, 0.00% Native American, 0.00% Asian, 0.00% Pacific Islander, 0.52% from other races, and 4.45% from two or more races. Hispanic or Latino of any race were 3.93% of the population.

There were 160 households, out of which 56.30% had children under the age of 18 living with them, 58.13% were married couples living together, 16.25% had a female householder with no spouse present, and 24.38% were non-families. 20.00% of all households were made up of individuals, and 13.80% had someone living alone who was 65 years of age or older. The average household size was 3.16 and the average family size was 3.73.

The township's age distribution consisted of 29.2% under the age of 18, 17.0% from 18 to 24, 23.7% from 25 to 44, 16.8% from 45 to 64, and 13.2% who were 65 years of age or older. The median age was 27.4 years. For every 100 females, there were 82.0 males. For every 100 females age 18 and over, there were 75.5 males.

The median income for a household in the township was $48,667, and the median income for a family was $60,417. Males had a median income of $47,500 versus $20,667 for females. The per capita income for the township was $21,506. About 8.3% of families and 11.1% of the population were below the poverty line, including 8.1% of those under age 18 and 22.4% of those age 65 or over.

Historical population
Census	Pop.	Note	%±
2000	404		—
2010	406		0.5%
2020	382		−5.9%
U.S. Decennial Census

== School districts ==
- Hoopeston Area Community Unit School District 11

== Political districts ==
- Illinois' 16th congressional district
- State House District 105
- State Senate District 53
