= Middleport Township, Iroquois County, Illinois =

Middleport Township
- Township
- Location in Iroquois County

- Iroquois County's location in Illinois
- Coordinates: 40°49′01″N 87°42′29″W
- Country: United States
- State: Illinois
- County: Iroquois
- Established: November 6, 1855

Area
  - Total: 36.49 sq mi (94.5 km^{2})
  - Land: 36.40 sq mi (94.3 km^{2})
  - Water: 0.09 sq mi (0.23 km^{2}) 0.25%
- Elevation: 633 ft (193 m)

Population (2020)
  - Total: 3,767
  - Density: 103.5/sq mi (39.96/km^{2})
- Time zone: UTC-6 (CST)
  - Summer (DST): UTC-5 (CDT)
- ZIP codes: 60951, 60966, 60970
- FIPS code: 17-075-48814

Middleport Township is one of twenty-six townships in Iroquois County, Illinois, USA. As of the 2020 census, its population was 3,767 and it contained 1,995 housing units. Middleport Township changed its name to Watseka Township in September 1863, but then changed back to Middleport Township on an unknown date.

== Geography ==
According to the 2021 census gazetteer files, Middleport Township has a total area of 36.49 square miles (94.51 km^{2}), of which 36.40 square miles (94.28 km^{2}) (or 99.75%) is land and 0.09 square miles (0.23 km^{2}) (or 0.25%) is water.

=== Cities, towns, villages ===
- Watseka (the county seat) (north half)

=== Unincorporated towns ===
- Pittwood at 40.860868°N 87.729478°W

=== Cemeteries ===
The township contains these five cemeteries: Chamberlain, Gard Army of the Republic, Lyman, Oak Hill and Roberts.

=== Major highways ===
- U.S. Route 24
- Illinois Route 1

=== Airports and landing strips ===
- Songwood Inn Airport

=== Landmarks ===
- Forest Park
- Kay Park
- Peters Park
- Shagbark Airport

== Demographics ==
As of the 2020 census there were 3,767 people, 2,001 households, and 1,129 families residing in the township. The population density was 103.23 inhabitants per square mile (39.86/km^{2}). There were 1,995 housing units at an average density of 54.67 per square mile (21.11/km^{2}). The racial makeup of the township was 86.83% White, 1.33% African American, 0.40% Native American, 0.77% Asian, 0.03% Pacific Islander, 2.42% from other races, and 8.23% from two or more races. Hispanic or Latino of any race were 8.02% of the population.

There were 2,001 households, out of which 21.80% had children under the age of 18 living with them, 33.08% were married couples living together, 19.84% had a female householder with no spouse present, and 43.58% were non-families. 34.50% of all households were made up of individuals, and 15.40% had someone living alone who was 65 years of age or older. The average household size was 1.96 and the average family size was 2.44.

The township's age distribution consisted of 15.9% under the age of 18, 10.9% from 18 to 24, 17.6% from 25 to 44, 31.4% from 45 to 64, and 24.1% who were 65 years of age or older. The median age was 50.9 years. For every 100 females, there were 78.0 males. For every 100 females age 18 and over, there were 77.5 males.

The median income for a household in the township was $36,308, and the median income for a family was $53,785. Males had a median income of $25,851 versus $25,587 for females. The per capita income for the township was $24,474. About 8.8% of families and 13.9% of the population were below the poverty line, including 11.0% of those under age 18 and 14.8% of those age 65 or over.

Historical population
| Census | Pop. | Note | %± |
|---|---|---|---|
| 2000 | 4,787 | | — |
| 2010 | 4,375 | | −8.6% |
| 2020 | 3,767 | | −13.9% |
U.S. Decennial Census

== School districts ==
- Donovan Community Unit School District 3
- Iroquois County Community Unit School District 9

== Political districts ==
- Illinois' 15th congressional district
- State House District 105
- State Senate District 53
