= Iroquois County, Illinois =

County in Illinois, United States

- County
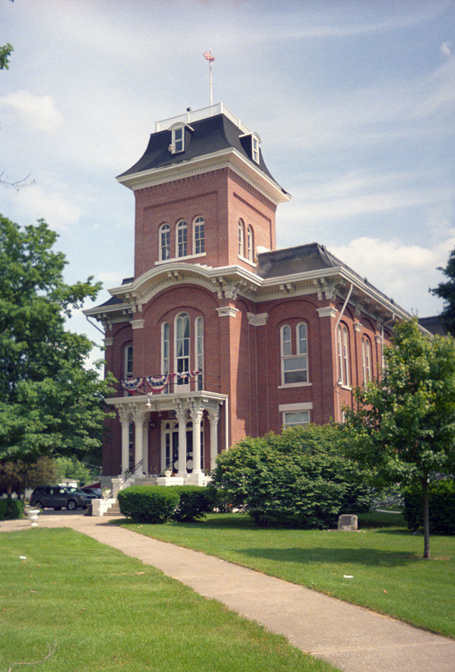
- Old Iroquois County Courthouse

- Location within the U.S. state of Illinois
- Coordinates: 40°44′N 87°49′W
- Country: United States
- State: Illinois
- Founded: 1833
- Named for: Iroquois River
- Seat: Watseka
- Largest city: Watseka

Area
  - Total: 1,119 sq mi (2,900 km^{2})
  - Land: 1,117 sq mi (2,890 km^{2})
  - Water: 1.6 sq mi (4.1 km^{2}) 0.1%

Population (2020)
  - Total: 27,077
  - Estimate (2025): 26,150 ▼
  - Density: 24.24/sq mi (9.359/km^{2})
- Time zone: UTC−6 (Central)
  - Summer (DST): UTC−5 (CDT)
- Congressional district: 2nd
- Website: iroquoiscountyil.gov

Iroquois County is a county located in the northeast part of the U.S. state of Illinois. According to the 2020 United States Census, it has a population of 27,077. It is the only county in the United States named Iroquois. The county seat is Watseka. The county is located along the border with Indiana.

== History ==
Iroquois County was created on February 26, 1833, out of a portion of Vermilion County. It was named for the Iroquois River, which was itself named for the Iroquois people. The first county seat was established at the town of Iroquois in 1837, though no official buildings were constructed there and offices were rented. Several other sites for the county seat were examined, and in 1839 it was moved to Middleport; a court house and jail were built there. There was a long battle between Middleport and Watseka (also known as South Middleport) as to which should be the county seat; in 1865, it was finally moved to Watseka. The town of Middleport no longer exists, but there is a township of that name. A courthouse was built in Watseka in 1866 at a cost of $28,000 and included a jail in the basement; this building was expanded in 1881, and a new jail was built in 1893 just east of the courthouse.

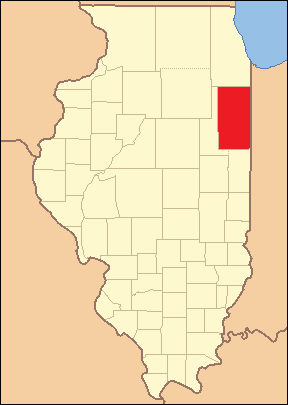
Iroquois County from the time of its creation to 1836

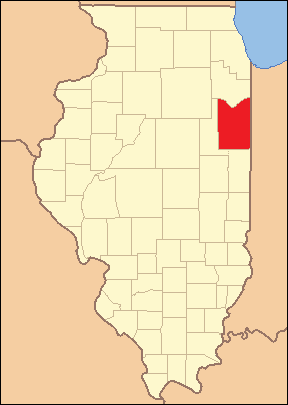
Iroquois County between 1836 and 1853

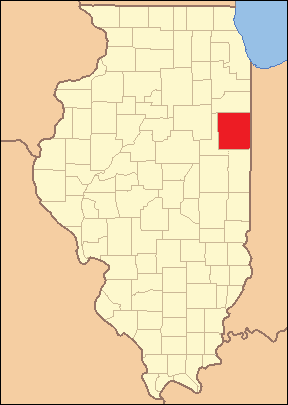
Iroquois County in 1853, when the creation of Kankakee County reduced it to its current size.

== Geography ==
According to the U.S. Census Bureau, the county has a total area of 1,119 square miles (2,900 km^{2}), of which 1,117 square miles (2,890 km^{2}) is land and 1.6 square miles (4.1 km^{2}) (0.1%) is water. It is the third-largest county in Illinois by land area and the fifth-largest by total area.

The northern border of the county is about 60 miles (97 km) south of the city of Chicago. The county is bordered on the east by the state of Indiana and its counties of Benton and Newton. To the north lies Kankakee County. Vermilion County, out of which Iroquois County was originally formed, lies to the south. To the west is Ford County.

The Iroquois River enters the county from Indiana and flows westward along the south side of the village of Iroquois, then along the north side of the city of Watseka, whereupon it veers to the north and joins the larger Kankakee River near the city of Kankakee in the county of the same name; the Kankakee River then flows into the Illinois River further to the northwest in Will County. Sugar Creek, further to the south, also flows from the east to the west, entering from Indiana east of Stockland; it passes through the south edge of Milford, is joined by Mud Creek coming up from the south, and winds to the north past the village of Woodland and meets the Iroquois River near Watseka.

The Iroquois County State Wildlife Area, a 2,400-acre (970 ha) state park, is located in the northeast corner of the county. There are also three nature preserves: Bonnie's Prairie, Hooper Branch Savanna, and Loda Cemetery Prairie.

=== Climate and weather ===
Watseka, Illinois

Climate chart (precipitation, max. and min. temperature)
J	F	M	A	M	J	J	A	S	O	N	D
1.6 30 14	1.7 36 18	3.4 48 29	3.8 60 39	4 72 50	4.6 82 59	4.2 84 63	3.7 83 61	3.4 77 53	2.9 64 41	3.3 49 32	2.6 36 21
- █ Average max. and min. temperatures in °F
- █ Precipitation totals in inches
- Source: The Weather Channel
Metric conversion
J	F	M	A	M	J	J	A	S	O	N	D
41 −1 −10	44 2 −8	85 9 −2	96 16 4	103 22 10	117 28 15	107 29 17	93 28 16	87 25 12	74 18 5	85 9 0	65 2 −6
- █ Average max. and min. temperatures in °C
- █ Precipitation totals in mm

In recent years, average temperatures in the county seat of Watseka have ranged from a low of 14 °F (−10 °C) in January to a high of 84 °F (29 °C) in July, although a record low of −28 °F (−33 °C) was recorded in January 1999 and a record high of 105 °F (41 °C) was recorded in August 1988. Average monthly precipitation ranged from 1.61 inches (41 mm) in January to 4.62 inches (117 mm) in June.

=== Adjacent counties ===
- Kankakee County - north
- Newton County, Indiana - east
- Benton County, Indiana - east
- Vermilion County - south
- Ford County - west

== Transportation ==
Transit service in the county is provided by SHOW Bus, which operates a local bus route within Watseka. Amtrak provides intercity passenger rail service on the Illini and Saluki at Gilman station.

Interstate 57 passes through the west part of the county on its route between Champaign and Chicago. From north to south, it passes through or near Chebanse, Clifton, Ashkum, Danforth, Gilman, Onarga, Buckley, and Loda.

The county is bisected by the east–west U.S. Route 24, which passes through Gilman, Crescent City, the county seat of Watseka, and Sheldon.

- Interstate 57
- U.S. Highway 45
- U.S. Highway 52
- Illinois Route 1
- Illinois Route 49
- Illinois Route 54
- Illinois Route 116

Several railroad lines pass through the county. The Toledo, Peoria and Western Railway operates a line that begins in Peoria and runs from east to west through Iroquois County, passing through Gilman and Watseka and continuing into Indiana. A Canadian National Railway line runs nearly parallel with Interstate 57 on its way to Chicago. A CSX Transportation line passes from north to south through the eastern part of the county; a Union Pacific line joins it south of Woodland. Further east, the Kankakee, Beaverville and Southern Railroad operates a north–south line.

== Demographics ==
Historical population
Census	Pop.	Note	%±
1840	1,695		—
1850	4,149		144.8%
1860	12,325		197.1%
1870	25,782		109.2%
1880	35,451		37.5%
1890	35,167		−0.8%
1900	38,014		8.1%
1910	35,543		−6.5%
1920	34,841		−2.0%
1930	32,913		−5.5%
1940	32,496		−1.3%
1950	32,348		−0.5%
1960	33,562		3.8%
1970	33,532		−0.1%
1980	32,976		−1.7%
1990	30,787		−6.6%
2000	31,334		1.8%
2010	29,718		−5.2%
2020	27,077		−8.9%
2025 (est.)	26,150	▼	−3.4%
U.S. Decennial Census; 1790-1960 1900-1990; 1990-2000 2010-2013

2000 census age pyramid for Iroquois County

=== 2020 census ===
As of the 2020 census, the county had a population of 27,077. The median age was 44.5 years. 22.0% of residents were under the age of 18 and 22.4% of residents were 65 years of age or older. For every 100 females there were 99.1 males, and for every 100 females age 18 and over there were 96.3 males age 18 and over.

The racial makeup of the county was 89.4% White, 0.9% Black or African American, 0.2% American Indian and Alaska Native, 0.4% Asian, <0.1% Native Hawaiian and Pacific Islander, 2.9% from some other race, and 6.2% from two or more races. Hispanic or Latino residents of any race comprised 7.7% of the population.

17.3% of residents lived in urban areas, while 82.7% lived in rural areas.

There were 11,160 households in the county, of which 27.6% had children under the age of 18 living in them. Of all households, 50.7% were married-couple households, 18.2% were households with a male householder and no spouse or partner present, and 24.3% were households with a female householder and no spouse or partner present. About 28.8% of all households were made up of individuals and 14.9% had someone living alone who was 65 years of age or older.

There were 12,779 housing units, of which 12.7% were vacant. Among occupied housing units, 76.5% were owner-occupied and 23.5% were renter-occupied. The homeowner vacancy rate was 2.2% and the rental vacancy rate was 12.5%.

=== Racial and ethnic composition ===
Iroquois County, Illinois – Racial and ethnic composition Note: the US Census treats Hispanic/Latino as an ethnic category. This table excludes Latinos from the racial categories and assigns them to a separate category. Hispanics/Latinos may be of any race.
Race / Ethnicity (NH = Non-Hispanic)	Pop 1980	Pop 1990	Pop 2000	Pop 2010	Pop 2020	% 1980	% 1990	% 2000	% 2010	% 2020
White alone (NH)	32,251	29,866	29,580	27,467	23,602	97.80%	97.01%	94.40%	92.43%	87.17%
Black or African American alone (NH)	193	163	222	233	212	0.59%	0.53%	0.71%	0.78%	0.78%
Native American or Alaska Native alone (NH)	23	30	42	42	38	0.07%	0.10%	0.13%	0.14%	0.14%
Asian alone (NH)	52	68	87	102	99	0.16%	0.22%	0.28%	0.34%	0.37%
Native Hawaiian or Pacific Islander alone (NH)	x	x	3	1	0	x	x	0.01%	0.00%	0.00%
Other race alone (NH)	28	0	12	4	48	0.08%	0.00%	0.04%	0.01%	0.18%
Mixed race or Multiracial (NH)	x	x	171	285	993	x	x	0.55%	0.96%	3.67%
Hispanic or Latino (any race)	429	660	1,217	1,584	2,085	1.30%	2.14%	3.88%	5.33%	7.70%
Total	32,976	30,787	31,334	29,718	27,077	100.00%	100.00%	100.00%	100.00%	100.00%

=== 2010 census ===
As of the 2010 United States census, there were 29,718 people, 11,956 households, and 8,175 families residing in the county. The population density was 26.6 inhabitants per square mile (10.3/km^{2}). There were 13,452 housing units at an average density of 12.0 per square mile (4.6/km^{2}). The racial makeup of the county was 94.7% white, 0.8% black or African American, 0.3% Asian, 0.2% American Indian, 2.6% from other races, and 1.3% from two or more races. Those of Hispanic or Latino origin made up 5.3% of the population. In terms of ancestry, 36.5% were German, 14.1% were Irish, 12.2% were American, and 10.1% were English.

Of the 11,956 households, 30.2% had children under the age of 18 living with them, 54.7% were married couples living together, 9.3% had a female householder with no husband present, 31.6% were non-families, and 27.2% of all households were made up of individuals. The average household size was 2.45 and the average family size was 2.95. The median age was 43.4 years.

The median income for a household in the county was $47,323 and the median income for a family was $56,541. Males had a median income of $43,416 versus $27,908 for females. The per capita income for the county was $23,400. About 8.2% of families and 10.0% of the population were below the poverty line, including 14.1% of those under age 18 and 7.8% of those age 65 or over.

== Communities ==
Map of Iroquois County, with townships labeled in red

=== Cities ===
- Gilman
- Watseka

=== Villages ===
- Ashkum
- Beaverville
- Buckley
- Chebanse
- Cissna Park
- Clifton
- Crescent City
- Danforth
- Donovan
- Iroquois
- Loda
- Martinton
- Milford
- Onarga
- Papineau
- Sheldon
- Thawville
- Wellington
- Woodland

=== Townships ===
In 1855, a popular vote resulted in the adoption of township government, which was implemented in 1856. At that time, eleven townships were created; they are listed below.

- Ash Grove
- Beaver
- Belmont
- Chebanse
- Concord
- Loda
- Middleport
- Milford
- Onarga
- Papineau
- Stockland

Over the next several decades, more townships were created from the existing ones, for a final total of twenty-six. The newer townships are listed below in order of creation.

- Martinton (1857)
- Iroquois (1858)
- Prairie Green (1858)
- Ashkum (1861)
- Douglas (1861)
- Artesia (1864)
- Fountain Creek (1868)
- Lovejoy (1868)
- Sheldon (1868)
- Milks Grove (1872)
- Pigeon Grove (1876)
- Crescent (1877)
- Danforth (1877)
- Ridgeland (1878)
- Beaverville (1916)

=== Unincorporated communities ===
- Bryce
- Claytonville
- Delrey
- Eastburn
- Effner
- Goodwine
- L'Erable
- La Hogue
- Pittwood
- Stockland

== Notable people ==
- Fern Andra, movie actress and director from 1913 to 1930, born in Watseka in 1893
- John Moisant, pioneering aviator and aeronautical engineer, born in L'Erable in 1868
- John S. Darrough, recipient of the Medal of Honor, American Civil War, lived in the county from age 14.
- Henry Bacon, architect, born in Wateska in 1866
- Rex Everhart, Broadway actor who voiced the role of Maurice in the Disney Film "Beauty & The Beast," born in Watseka in 1920
- Scott Garrelts, Pitcher, San Francisco Giants, 1st round draft pick in 1979 amateur draft, grew up in Buckley, graduated from Buckley-Loda High School
- Ray A. Laird, president of Laredo Community College in Laredo, Texas, 1960 to 1974; born in Milford in 1907
- Ole Rynning (1809–1838), Norwegian immigrant author
- Fred J. Schraeder (1923-2016), Illinois state representative and businessman, born in Clifton

== Politics ==
Throughout the rest of its history, Iroquois County has been among the most solidly Republican counties in Illinois. Since 1940 only Lyndon Johnson in his 1964 landslide has garnered forty percent of the county's vote for the Democratic Party, and only Bill Clinton in 1996 has topped 35 percent since 1968. As of February 2025, the county is one of 7 that voted to join the state of Indiana.

United States presidential election results for Iroquois County, Illinois
Year	Republican		Democratic		Third party(ies)	
Year	No.	%	No.	%	No.	%
1892	3,936	47.95%	3,848	46.88%	425	5.18%
1896	5,325	58.01%	3,658	39.85%	196	2.14%
1900	5,243	56.39%	3,736	40.19%	318	3.42%
1904	5,067	62.44%	2,376	29.28%	672	8.28%
1908	4,855	58.94%	2,966	36.01%	416	5.05%
1912	1,866	24.83%	2,474	32.92%	3,176	42.26%
1916	8,503	61.10%	4,977	35.76%	436	3.13%
1920	9,186	77.79%	2,429	20.57%	194	1.64%
1924	7,498	64.07%	2,303	19.68%	1,901	16.25%
1928	8,453	60.71%	5,421	38.94%	49	0.35%
1932	6,303	39.65%	9,434	59.34%	161	1.01%
1936	7,908	46.05%	8,654	50.39%	611	3.56%
1940	11,047	60.73%	7,036	38.68%	108	0.59%
1944	10,389	66.39%	5,168	33.03%	91	0.58%
1948	9,051	64.65%	4,823	34.45%	127	0.91%
1952	12,456	72.81%	4,634	27.09%	17	0.10%
1956	12,104	72.88%	4,487	27.02%	18	0.11%
1960	11,376	66.09%	5,821	33.82%	16	0.09%
1964	9,423	57.28%	7,029	42.72%	0	0.00%
1968	10,885	67.89%	3,897	24.31%	1,251	7.80%
1972	11,995	75.99%	3,723	23.59%	66	0.42%
1976	10,129	65.43%	5,167	33.38%	185	1.20%
1980	11,247	73.38%	3,362	21.94%	718	4.68%
1984	11,327	77.13%	3,300	22.47%	58	0.39%
1988	9,596	69.11%	4,221	30.40%	69	0.50%
1992	6,948	47.82%	4,440	30.56%	3,142	21.62%
1996	6,564	51.53%	4,559	35.79%	1,614	12.67%
2000	8,685	64.70%	4,397	32.75%	342	2.55%
2004	9,914	71.66%	3,832	27.70%	89	0.64%
2008	8,695	63.82%	4,643	34.08%	286	2.10%
2012	9,120	71.19%	3,413	26.64%	278	2.17%
2016	9,750	74.42%	2,504	19.11%	848	6.47%
2020	10,877	77.45%	2,908	20.71%	258	1.84%
2024	10,376	77.70%	2,747	20.57%	231	1.73%

== See also ==
- National Register of Historic Places listings in Iroquois County, Illinois
- Watseka Wonder, alleged spiritual possession of fourteen-year-old Lurancy Vennum in the late 19th century
