= Herman L. Smith =

American mathematician

Herman Lyle Smith
- Born: July 7, 1892; Pittwood, Illinois, U.S.
- Died: 1950 (aged 57–58)
- Education: University of Oregon (BS), University of Chicago (MS, PhD)
- Known for: Moore–Smith sequence (net)
- Scientific career
- Fields: Mathematics
- Workplaces: Louisiana State University
- Thesis: The Minkowski Linear Measure for a Simple Rectifiable Curve (1926)
- Doctoral advisor: E. H. Moore
- Notable students: Fleddermann, Harry, Rickey, Frank

Herman Lyle Smith (July 7, 1892 – 1950) was an American mathematician, the co-discoverer, with E. H. Moore, of nets, and also a discoverer of the related notion of filters independently of Henri Cartan.

Born in Pittwood, Illinois, Smith received his B.S. degree from the University of Oregon in 1914 and his M.S. from the University of Chicago the following year. His Ph.D. was granted in 1926 by the University of Chicago for work done under Moore. He was later employed as a professor of mathematics by Louisiana State University.
