= Danforth, Illinois =

- Village
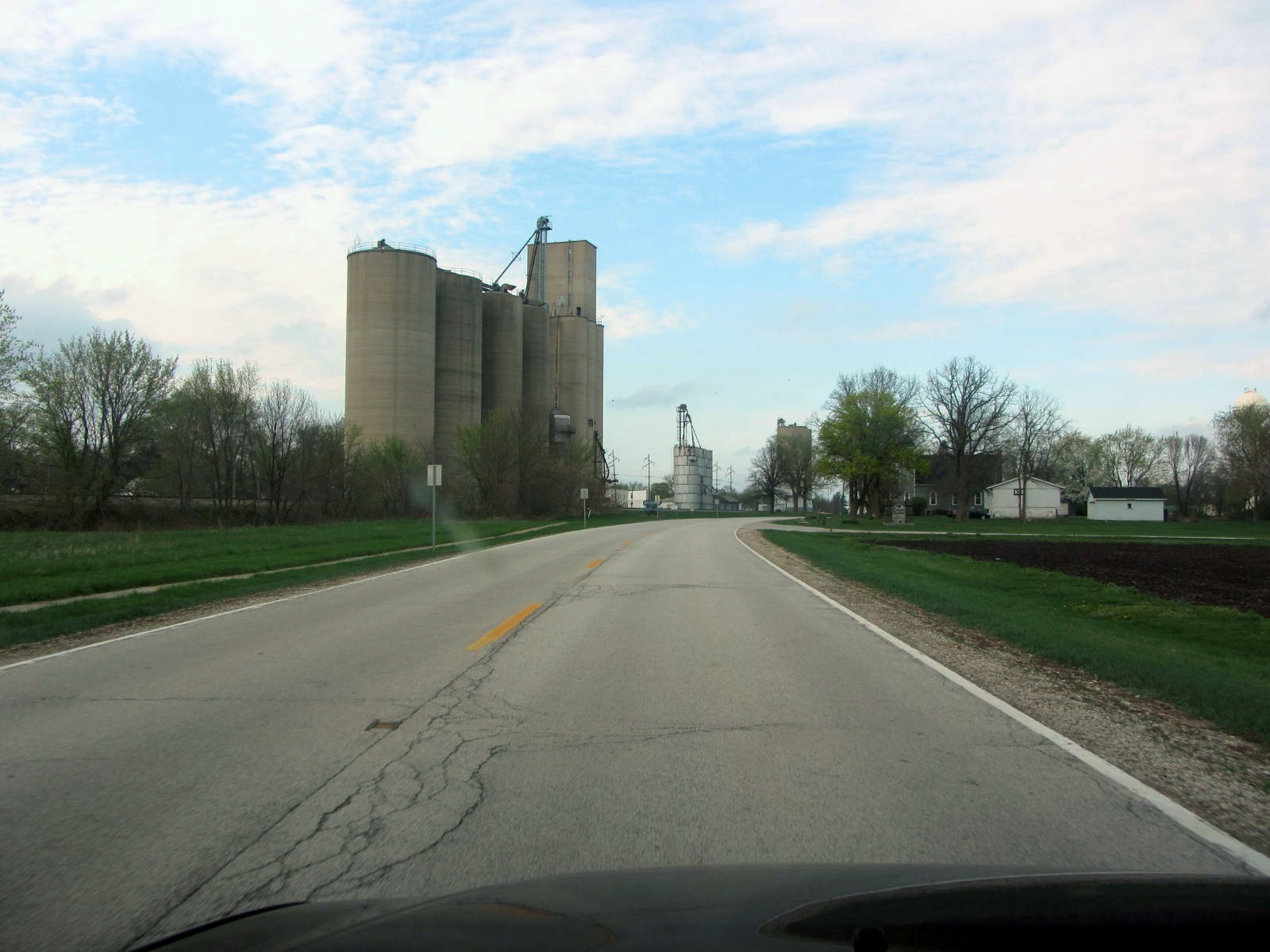
- Entering Danforth

- Location of Danforth in Iroquois County, Illinois

- Danforth's location in Iroquois County
- Coordinates: 40°49′19″N 87°58′40″W
- Country: United States
- State: Illinois
- County: Iroquois
- Township: Danforth

Area
  - Total: 0.48 sq mi (1.24 km^{2})
  - Land: 0.48 sq mi (1.24 km^{2})
  - Water: 0 sq mi (0.00 km^{2})
- Elevation: 653 ft (199 m)

Population (2020)
  - Total: 594
  - Density: 1,242.6/sq mi (479.78/km^{2})
- Time zone: UTC-6 (CST)
  - Summer (DST): UTC-5 (CDT)
- ZIP code: 60930
- Area codes: 815, 779
- FIPS code: 17-18498
- GNIS feature ID: 2398678

Danforth is a village in Danforth Township, Iroquois County, Illinois, United States. The population was 594 at the 2020 census.

== History ==
Danforth was laid out in 1872 when the railroad was extended to that point. It mainly started out with most of the population being farmers and their families. The village was named for its founder, George M. Danforth.

== Geography ==
U.S. Route 45 passes through the center of the village, leading north 4 miles (6 km) to Ashkum and south the same distance to Gilman.

According to the 2021 census gazetteer files, Danforth has a total area of 0.48 square miles (1.24 km^{2}), all land.

== Demographics ==
Historical population
Census	Pop.	Note	%±
1900	407		—
1910	410		0.7%
1920	398		−2.9%
1930	369		−7.3%
1940	362		−1.9%
1950	385		6.4%
1960	394		2.3%
1970	404		2.5%
1980	554		37.1%
1990	457		−17.5%
2000	587		28.4%
2010	604		2.9%
2020	594		−1.7%
U.S. Decennial Census

As of the 2020 census there were 594 people, 226 households, and 119 families residing in the village. The population density was 1,242.68 inhabitants per square mile (479.80/km^{2}). There were 230 housing units at an average density of 481.17 per square mile (185.78/km^{2}). The racial makeup of the village was 95.29% White, 0.00% African American, 0.00% Native American, 0.00% Asian, 0.00% Pacific Islander, 1.18% from other races, and 3.54% from two or more races. Hispanic or Latino of any race were 3.03% of the population.

There were 226 households, out of which 33.2% had children under the age of 18 living with them, 40.27% were married couples living together, 3.98% had a female householder with no husband present, and 47.35% were non-families. 41.59% of all households were made up of individuals, and 26.11% had someone living alone who was 65 years of age or older. The average household size was 2.86 and the average family size was 2.17.

The village's age distribution consisted of 22.5% under the age of 18, 3.3% from 18 to 24, 19.9% from 25 to 44, 20.8% from 45 to 64, and 33.6% who were 65 years of age or older. The median age was 50.4 years. For every 100 females, there were 77.2 males. For every 100 females age 18 and over, there were 74.5 males.

The median income for a household in the village was $40,278, and the median income for a family was $50,625. Males had a median income of $37,500 versus $13,750 for females. The per capita income for the village was $21,980. About 26.1% of families and 25.8% of the population were below the poverty line, including 24.4% of those under age 18 and 10.6% of those age 65 or over.
