= Buckley, Illinois =

- Village
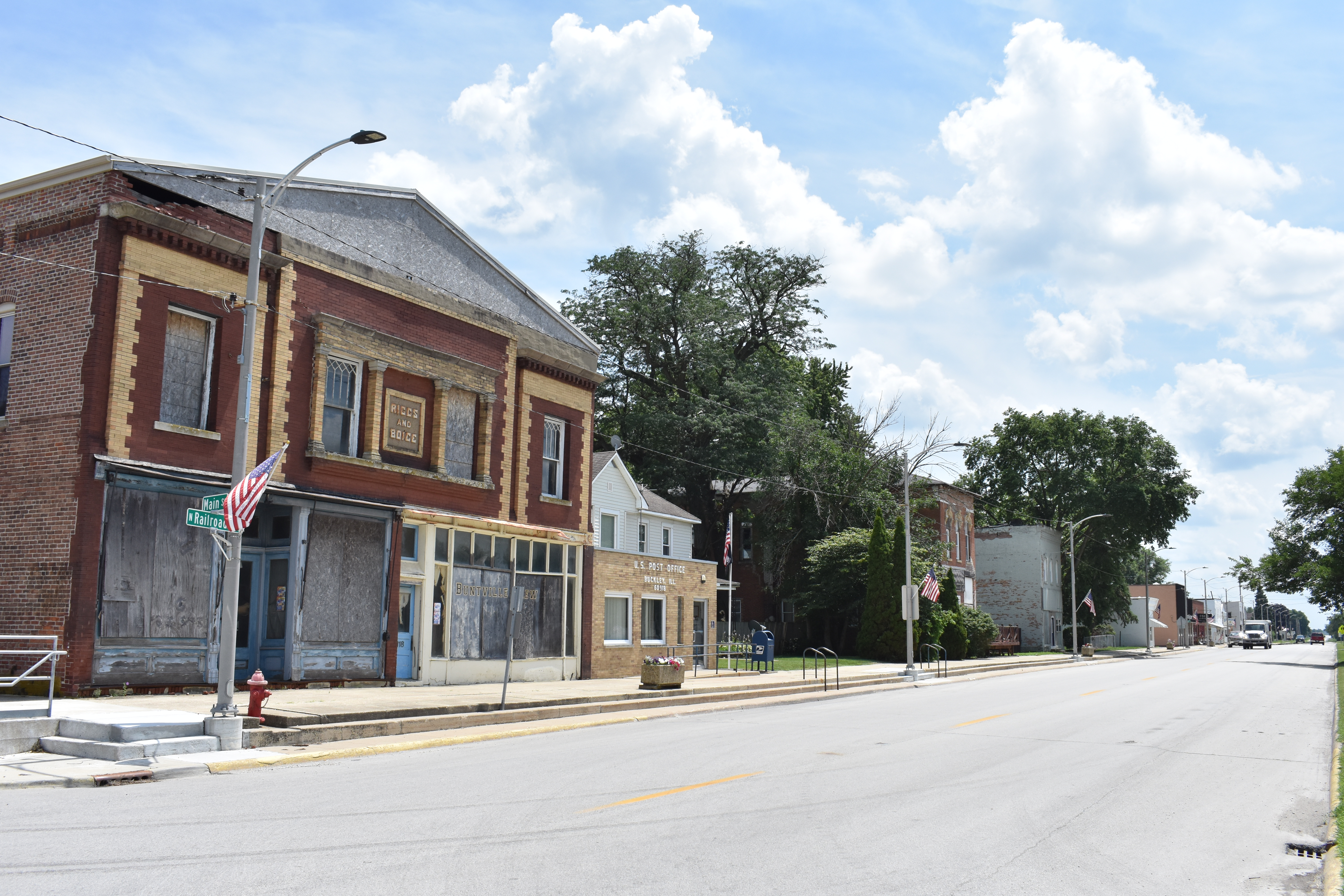
- Buckley in July 2026

- Location of Buckley in Iroquois County, Illinois

- Buckley's location in Iroquois County
- Coordinates: 40°35′50″N 88°02′16″W
- Country: United States
- State: Illinois
- County: Iroquois
- Township: Artesia

Area
  - Total: 0.32 sq mi (0.82 km^{2})
  - Land: 0.32 sq mi (0.82 km^{2})
  - Water: 0 sq mi (0.00 km^{2})
- Elevation: 699 ft (213 m)

Population (2020)
  - Total: 495
  - Density: 1,568.9/sq mi (605.77/km^{2})
- Time zone: UTC-6 (CST)
  - Summer (DST): UTC-5 (CDT)
- ZIP code: 60918
- Area code: 217
- FIPS code: 17-09317
- GNIS feature ID: 2397485

Buckley is a village in Artesia Township, Iroquois County, Illinois, United States. The population was 495 at the 2020 census. Buckley celebrated its sesquicentennial in 2006.

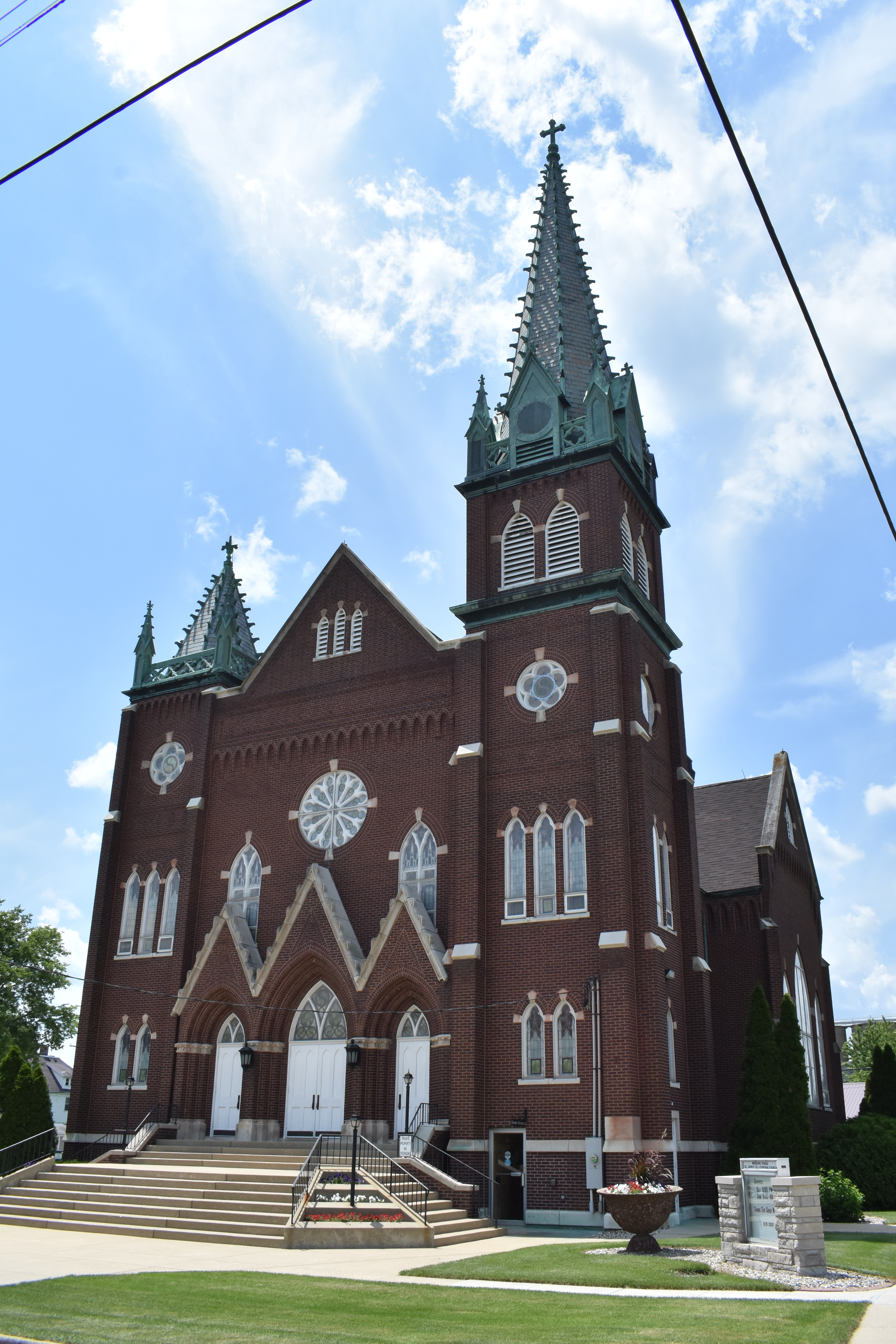
St. John's Lutheran Church

== Geography ==
U.S. Route 45 passes through the village, leading north 8 miles (13 km) to Onarga and south 6 miles (10 km) to Loda. Interstate 57 passes 1 mile (2 km) west of Buckley, with access from Exit 272. I-57 leads north 38 miles (61 km) to Kankakee and south 36 miles (58 km) to Champaign.

According to the 2021 census gazetteer files, Buckley has a total area of 0.32 square miles (0.83 km^{2}), all land.

== Demographics ==
Historical population
Census	Pop.	Note	%±
1880	324		—
1890	433		33.6%
1900	490		13.2%
1910	495		1.0%
1920	461		−6.9%
1930	485		5.2%
1940	457		−5.8%
1950	554		21.2%
1960	690		24.5%
1970	680		−1.4%
1980	604		−11.2%
1990	557		−7.8%
2000	593		6.5%
2010	600		1.2%
2020	495		−17.5%
U.S. Decennial Census

As of the 2020 census there were 495 people, 243 households, and 169 families residing in the village. The population density was 1,566.46 inhabitants per square mile (604.81/km^{2}). There were 253 housing units at an average density of 800.63 per square mile (309.12/km^{2}). The racial makeup of the village was 92.32% White, 1.41% African American, 0.61% Native American, 0.40% Asian, 0.00% Pacific Islander, 0.61% from other races, and 4.65% from two or more races. Hispanic or Latino of any race were 3.03% of the population.

There were 243 households, out of which 27.6% had children under the age of 18 living with them, 57.20% were married couples living together, 0.00% had a female householder with no husband present, and 30.45% were non-families. 29.63% of all households were made up of individuals, and 15.64% had someone living alone who was 65 years of age or older. The average household size was 2.47 and the average family size was 2.10.

The village's age distribution consisted of 18.6% under the age of 18, 3.1% from 18 to 24, 23.6% from 25 to 44, 34.7% from 45 to 64, and 19.8% who were 65 years of age or older. The median age was 49.8 years. For every 100 females, there were 118.9 males. For every 100 females age 18 and over, there were 115.0 males.

The median income for a household in the village was $57,750, and the median income for a family was $75,156. Males had a median income of $44,722 versus $29,286 for females. The per capita income for the village was $31,902. About 1.2% of families and 7.1% of the population were below the poverty line, including 3.2% of those under age 18 and 2.0% of those age 65 or over.

== Education ==
Buckley is home to St. John's Lutheran School, which is affiliated with St. John's Lutheran Church. The school opened in 1870 and its current building is located at 206 East Main Street. The private high school, Christ Lutheran High School, is also located in Buckley.
