= Wellington, Illinois =

Village in Iroquois County, Illinois, United States

- Village
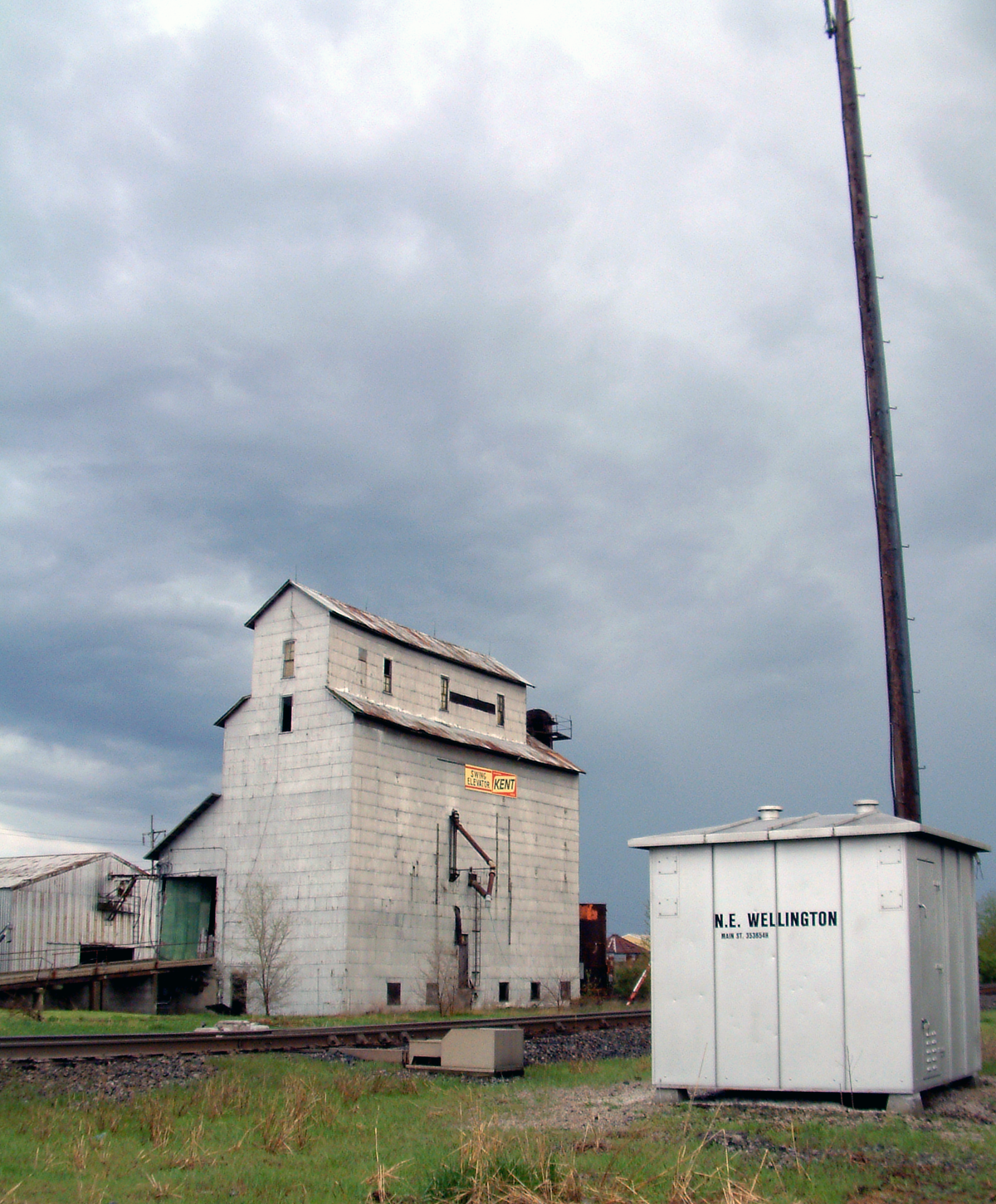
- The grain elevator and railroad in Wellington

- Location in Iroquois County, Illinois

- Location in Iroquois County
- Coordinates: 40°32′28″N 87°40′48″W
- Country: United States
- State: Illinois
- County: Iroquois
- Township: Lovejoy

Area
  - Total: 0.24 sq mi (0.62 km^{2})
  - Land: 0.24 sq mi (0.62 km^{2})
  - Water: 0 sq mi (0.00 km^{2})
- Elevation: 696 ft (212 m)

Population (2020)
  - Total: 206
  - Density: 867/sq mi (334.8/km^{2})
- Time zone: UTC-6 (CST)
  - Summer (DST): UTC-5 (CDT)
- ZIP code: 60973
- Area code: 815
- FIPS code: 17-79735
- GNIS feature ID: 2400123

Wellington is a village in Lovejoy Township, Iroquois County, Illinois, United States. The population was 206 at the 2020 census.

== Geography ==
Wellington is located in southeastern Iroquois County at 40°32′29″N 87°40′51″W (40.541261, -87.680772). Illinois Route 1 passes less than a mile west of the village, leading north 18 miles (29 km) to Watseka, the county seat, and south 5 miles (8 km) to Hoopeston.

According to the 2021 census gazetteer files, Wellington has a total area of 0.24 square miles (0.62 km^{2}), all land.

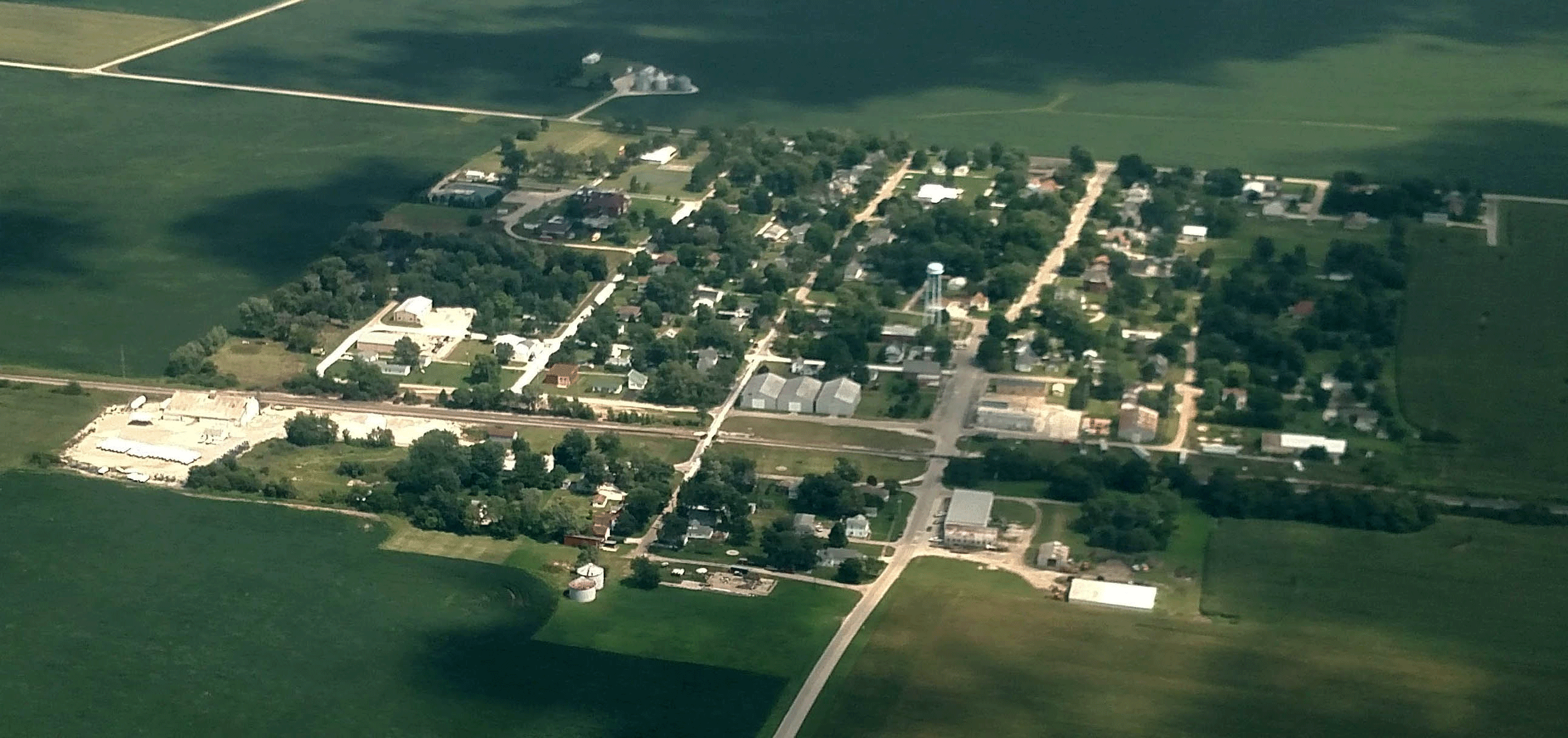
Aerial view looking to the east

== Demographics ==
Historical population
Census	Pop.	Note	%±
1910	295		—
1920	288		−2.4%
1930	303		5.2%
1940	297		−2.0%
1950	300		1.0%
1960	334		11.3%
1970	410		22.8%
1980	370		−9.8%
1990	294		−20.5%
2000	264		−10.2%
2010	242		−8.3%
2020	206		−14.9%
U.S. Decennial Census

As of the 2020 census there were 206 people, 96 households, and 67 families residing in the village. The population density was 865.55 inhabitants per square mile (334.19/km^{2}). There were 103 housing units at an average density of 432.77 per square mile (167.09/km^{2}). The racial makeup of the village was 95.63% White, 0.00% African American, 0.00% Native American, 0.00% Asian, 0.00% Pacific Islander, 0.00% from other races, and 4.37% from two or more races. Hispanic or Latino of any race were 3.88% of the population.

There were 96 households, out of which 37.5% had children under the age of 18 living with them, 56.25% were married couples living together, 11.46% had a female householder with no husband present, and 30.21% were non-families. 22.92% of all households were made up of individuals, and 12.50% had someone living alone who was 65 years of age or older. The average household size was 2.87 and the average family size was 2.47.

The village's age distribution consisted of 24.1% under the age of 18, 11.8% from 18 to 24, 27.4% from 25 to 44, 12.7% from 45 to 64, and 24.1% who were 65 years of age or older. The median age was 33.3 years. For every 100 females, there were 82.3 males. For every 100 females age 18 and over, there were 78.2 males.

The median income for a household in the village was $37,500, and the median income for a family was $43,438. Males had a median income of $49,583 versus $23,750 for females. The per capita income for the village was $18,024. About 14.9% of families and 19.4% of the population were below the poverty line, including 21.1% of those under age 18 and 8.8% of those age 65 or over.

== See also ==
- List of municipalities in Illinois
