= Prairie Green Township, Iroquois County, Illinois =

Prairie Green Township
- Township
- Location in Iroquois County

- Iroquois County's location in Illinois
- Coordinates: 40°32′15″N 87°35′35″W
- Country: United States
- State: Illinois
- County: Iroquois
- Established: March 1857

Area
  - Total: 40.67 sq mi (105.3 km^{2})
  - Land: 40.67 sq mi (105.3 km^{2})
  - Water: 0 sq mi (0 km^{2}) 0%
- Elevation: 741 ft (226 m)

Population (2020)
  - Total: 162
  - Density: 3.98/sq mi (1.54/km^{2})
- Time zone: UTC-6 (CST)
  - Summer (DST): UTC-5 (CDT)
- ZIP codes: 60942, 60953, 60973
- FIPS code: 17-075-61665

Prairie Green Township is one of twenty-six townships in Iroquois County, Illinois, United States. As of the 2020 census, its population was 162 and it contained 80 housing units. Prairie Green Township was originally named Prairie Township, and was formed from Stockland Township, originally known as Crab Apple Township, in March 1857. The name was changed to Prairie Green Township in March 1858.

== Geography ==
According to the 2021 census gazetteer files, Prairie Green Township has a total area of 40.67 square miles (105.33 km^{2}), all land.

=== Unincorporated towns ===
- Greer at 40.533092°N 87.594745°W
- Hallock at 40.561425°N 87.596135°W

(This list is based on USGS data and may include former settlements.)

== Demographics ==
As of the 2020 census there were 162 people, 19 households, and 9 families residing in the township. The population density was 3.98 inhabitants per square mile (1.54/km^{2}). There were 80 housing units at an average density of 1.97 per square mile (0.76/km^{2}). The racial makeup of the township was 85.80% White, 0.00% African American, 0.00% Native American, 0.62% Asian, 0.00% Pacific Islander, 4.94% from other races, and 8.64% from two or more races. Hispanic or Latino of any race were 13.58% of the population.

There were 19 households, out of which 47.40% had children under the age of 18 living with them, 47.37% were married couples living together, 0.00% had a female householder with no spouse present, and 52.63% were non-families. 52.60% of all households were made up of individuals, and 52.60% had someone living alone who was 65 years of age or older. The average household size was 2.68 and the average family size was 4.56.

The township's age distribution consisted of 41.2% under the age of 18, 0.0% from 18 to 24, 0% from 25 to 44, 39.2% from 45 to 64, and 19.6% who were 65 years of age or older. The median age was 46.4 years. For every 100 females, there were 112.5 males. For every 100 females age 18 and over, there were 172.7 males.

Historical population
Census	Pop.	Note	%±
2000	271		—
2010	183		−32.5%
2020	162		−11.5%
U.S. Decennial Census

== School districts ==
- Hoopeston Area Community Unit School District 11
- Milford Community Consolidated School District 124

The entire township once made up part of the Wellington School District. The Wellington, IL schools closed in 1987 and later the township was divided between Milford and Hoopeston schools.

== Political districts ==
- Illinois' 15th congressional district
- State House District 105
- State Senate District 53

== Religion ==
Residents of the township have consisted primarily of Christians of the Protestant tradition since the time of the township's founding. Currently there is one church in Prairie Green Township, the Prairie Green Church of Christ. Established in 1872 as the Hope Congregation of the Disciples of Christ, it located in Prairie Green Township shortly thereafter. Since 1957, the church has been located in Greer. An undenominational body, the church is identified with the Christian Churches and Churches of Christ and currently has approximately 50 active members and adherents.

The United Methodist (formerly Methodist Episcopal) denomination has also had a strong presence within the township since the 1800s. The Pleasant Hill Methodist Church was once an active congregation in the Northeast part of the township, but closed in the early 1960s. At that time the majority of members transferred to the Wellington Methodist Church (now Wellington United Methodist Church) in Lovejoy Township.
