= Ash Grove =

Ash Grove may refer to:

- The Ash Grove, a Welsh folk song.
- Ash Grove (music club) in Los Angeles, California, United States
- Ash Grove (plantation) in Fairfax County, Virginia, United States
- Ash Grove Cement Company in Overland Park, Kansas, United States
- Ash Grove, Kansas, United States
- Ash Grove, Missouri, United States
- Ash Grove Township, Iroquois County, Illinois, United States
- Ash Grove Township, Shelby County, Illinois, United States
- Ash Grove, Wrexham, Wales
