= Delrey, Illinois =

- Unincorporated community
- Iroquois County's location in Illinois

- Delrey's location in Iroquois County
- Country: United States
- State: Illinois
- County: Iroquois
- Elevation: 663 ft (202 m)
- Time zone: UTC-6 (Central (CST))
  - Summer (DST): UTC-5 (CDT)
- Area codes: 815 & 779
- GNIS feature ID: 407111

Delrey is an unincorporated community in Iroquois County, in the U.S. state of Illinois.

== History ==
A post office was established at Delrey in 1854, and remained in operation until the 1950s. The community's name commemorates the Battle of Molino del Rey in the Mexican–American War.
