= Pittwood, Illinois =

- Unincorporated community
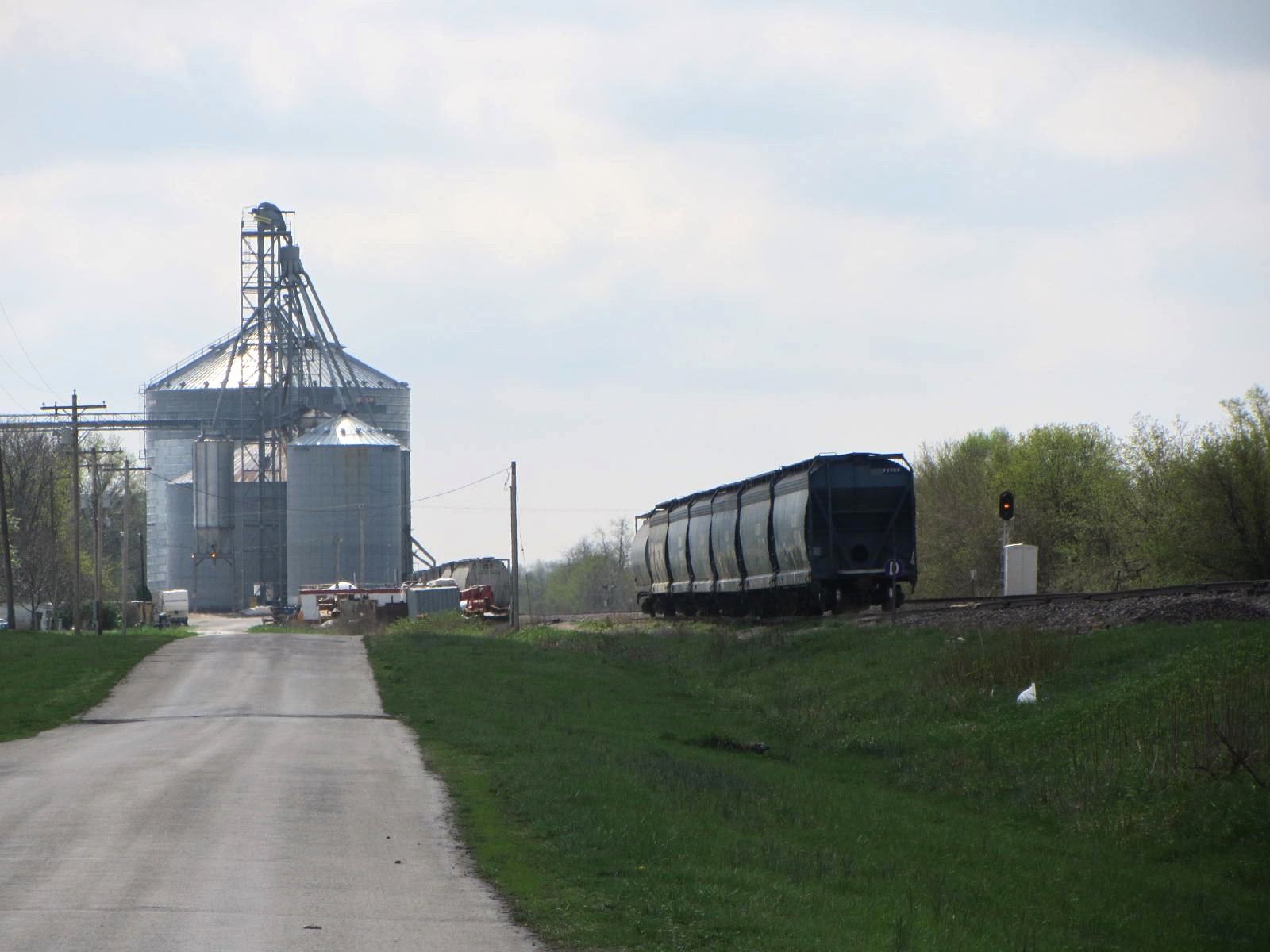
- Grain elevator and railroad in Pittwood

- Iroquois County's location in Illinois

- Pittwood's location in Iroquois County
- Coordinates: 40°51′39″N 87°43′46″W
- Country: United States
- State: Illinois
- County: Iroquois County
- Township: Middleport Township
- Elevation: 643 ft (196 m)
- ZIP code: 60970
- GNIS feature ID: 0415749

Pittwood is an unincorporated community in Middleport Township, Iroquois County, Illinois, United States.

== Geography ==
Pittwood is located at an elevation of 643 feet.
