= Ash Grove Township, Franklin County, Nebraska =

Ash Grove Township
- Township
- Interactive map of Ash Grove Township
- Coordinates: 40°10′24″N 099°07′34″W
- Country: United States
- State: Nebraska
- County: Franklin County
- Elevation: 2,142 ft (653 m)

Population (2010)
  - Total: 108
- Time zone: UTC-6 (CST)
  - Summer (DST): UTC-5 (CDT)
- FIPS code: 31-02270
- GNIS feature ID: 837861

Ash Grove is one of thirteen townships in Franklin County, Nebraska, United States. The population was 108 at the 2010 census.
