= Stockland Township, Iroquois County, Illinois =

Stockland Township
- Township
- Location in Iroquois County

- Iroquois County's location in Illinois
- Coordinates: 40°38′07″N 87°35′37″W
- Country: United States
- State: Illinois
- County: Iroquois
- Established: September 1864

Area
  - Total: 53.51 sq mi (138.6 km^{2})
  - Land: 53.51 sq mi (138.6 km^{2})
  - Water: 0 sq mi (0 km^{2}) 0%
- Elevation: 666 ft (203 m)

Population (2020)
  - Total: 216
  - Density: 4.04/sq mi (1.56/km^{2})
- Time zone: UTC-6 (CST)
  - Summer (DST): UTC-5 (CDT)
- ZIP codes: 60953, 60966, 60967
- FIPS code: 17-075-72773

Stockland Township is one of twenty-six townships in Iroquois County, Illinois, USA. As of the 2020 census, its population was 216 and it contained 103 housing units. Stockland Township formed as Crab Apple Township in September 1864, but changed its name to Stockland Township on an unknown date.

== Geography ==
According to the 2021 census gazetteer files, Stockland Township has a total area of 53.51 square miles (138.59 km^{2}), all land.

=== Unincorporated place names ===
- Cutmer at 40.650314°N 87.600026°W is the site of a grain elevator, first built in 1903.
- Stockland at 40.614481°N 87.592803°W

(This list is based on USGS data and may include former settlements.)

=== Cemeteries ===
The township contains Sugar Creek Chapel Cemetery.

=== Airports and landing strips ===
- Wichman Airport

=== Landmarks ===
- Dawson Park

== Demographics ==
As of the 2020 census there were 216 people, 81 households, and 61 families residing in the township. The population density was 4.04 inhabitants per square mile (1.56/km^{2}). There were 103 housing units at an average density of 1.92 per square mile (0.74/km^{2}). The racial makeup of the township was 94.44% White, 0.00% African American, 0.46% Native American, 0.00% Asian, 0.00% Pacific Islander, 0.00% from other races, and 5.09% from two or more races. Hispanic or Latino of any race were 3.70% of the population.

There were 81 households, out of which 23.50% had children under the age of 18 living with them, 75.31% were married couples living together, 0.00% had a female householder with no spouse present, and 24.69% were non-families. 24.70% of all households were made up of individuals, and 13.60% had someone living alone who was 65 years of age or older. The average household size was 2.51 and the average family size was 3.00.

The township's age distribution consisted of 21.2% under the age of 18, 8.9% from 18 to 24, 19.3% from 25 to 44, 23.7% from 45 to 64, and 27.1% who were 65 years of age or older. The median age was 50.1 years. For every 100 females, there were 144.6 males. For every 100 females age 18 and over, there were 162.3 males.

The median income for a household in the township was $48,844, and the median income for a family was $48,906. The per capita income for the township was $18,275.

Historical population
Census	Pop.	Note	%±
2000	319		—
2010	243		−23.8%
2020	216		−11.1%
U.S. Decennial Census

== Political districts ==
- Illinois' 15th congressional district
- State House District 105
- State Senate District 53
