= Goodwine, Illinois =

Goodwine
- Unincorporated community
- Iroquois County's location in Illinois

- Goodwine's location in Iroquois County
- Coordinates: 40°34′02″N 87°47′04″W
- Country: United States
- State: Illinois
- County: Iroquois County
- Township: Fountain Creek Township
- Elevation: 659 ft (201 m)
- ZIP code: 60953
- Area codes: 815, 779
- GNIS feature ID: 0409157

Goodwine is an unincorporated community in southern Iroquois County, Illinois, United States.

== Geography ==
Goodwine lies along Iroquis County Road 800 East approximately 14 miles south of the city of Watseka, the county seat. Its elevation is 659 feet (201 m), and it is located at 40°34′2″N 87°47′4″W (40.5672584, -87.7844742) near the northeast corner of Fountain Creek Township. Although Goodwine is unincorporated, it has a post office, with the ZIP code of 60939.

The town sits at the intersection of two rail lines, an active Union Pacific route connecting Chicago and St. Louis, and a defunct east–west Chicago and Eastern Illinois Railroad line.

Fountain Creek runs west of town, flowing northeast toward its confluence with Mud Creek.
