= Stockland, Illinois =

- Unincorporated community
- Iroquois County's location in Illinois

- Stockland's location in Iroquois County
- Coordinates: 40°36′52″N 87°35′34″W
- Country: United States
- State: Illinois
- County: Iroquois County
- Township: Stockland Township
- Elevation: 673 ft (205 m)
- ZIP code: 60967
- GNIS feature ID: 0419152

Stockland is an unincorporated community in Stockland Township, Iroquois County, Illinois.

== Geography ==
Stockland is located at 40°36′52″N 87°35′34″W.
