= Onarga Township, Iroquois County, Illinois =

Onarga Township
- Township
- Location in Iroquois County

- Iroquois County's location in Illinois
- Coordinates: 40°42′29″N 87°57′44″W
- Country: United States
- State: Illinois
- County: Iroquois
- Established: November 6, 1855

Area
  - Total: 48.55 sq mi (125.7 km^{2})
  - Land: 48.53 sq mi (125.7 km^{2})
  - Water: 0.02 sq mi (0.052 km^{2}) 0.04%
- Elevation: 653 ft (199 m)

Population (2020)
  - Total: 1,613
  - Density: 33.24/sq mi (12.83/km^{2})
- Time zone: UTC-6 (CST)
  - Summer (DST): UTC-5 (CDT)
- ZIP codes: 60918, 60938, 60955, 60968
- FIPS code: 17-075-56094

Onarga Township is one of twenty-six townships in Iroquois County, Illinois, United States. As of the 2020 census, its population was 1,613 and it contained 625 housing units.

== Geography ==
According to the 2021 census gazetteer files, Onarga Township has a total area of 48.55 square miles (125.74 km^{2}), of which 48.53 square miles (125.69 km^{2}) (or 99.96%) is land and 0.02 square miles (0.05 km^{2}) (or 0.04%) is water.

=== Cities, towns, villages ===
- Onarga

=== Unincorporated towns ===
- Delrey at 40.672813°N 88.017262°W

(This list is based on USGS data and may include former settlements.)

=== Cemeteries ===
The township contains Onarga Cemetery.

=== Major highways ===
- Interstate 57
- U.S. Route 45
- Illinois Route 54

== Demographics ==
As of the 2020 census there were 1,613 people, 527 households, and 352 families residing in the township. The population density was 33.22 inhabitants per square mile (12.83/km^{2}). There were 625 housing units at an average density of 12.87 per square mile (4.97/km^{2}). The racial makeup of the township was 62.12% White, 1.36% African American, 0.37% Native American, 0.43% Asian, 0.00% Pacific Islander, 18.78% from other races, and 16.92% from two or more races. Hispanic or Latino of any race were 41.85% of the population.

There were 527 households, out of which 31.10% had children under the age of 18 living with them, 51.23% were married couples living together, 12.90% had a female householder with no spouse present, and 33.21% were non-families. 30.00% of all households were made up of individuals, and 20.10% had someone living alone who was 65 years of age or older. The average household size was 2.64 and the average family size was 3.35.

The township's age distribution consisted of 27.3% under the age of 18, 8.4% from 18 to 24, 22.4% from 25 to 44, 24.1% from 45 to 64, and 17.8% who were 65 years of age or older. The median age was 40.2 years. For every 100 females, there were 100.1 males. For every 100 females age 18 and over, there were 81.5 males.

The median income for a household in the township was $51,563, and the median income for a family was $68,393. Males had a median income of $37,109 versus $26,354 for females. The per capita income for the township was $24,052. About 12.8% of families and 14.8% of the population were below the poverty line, including 17.1% of those under age 18 and 14.6% of those age 65 or over.

Historical population
Census	Pop.	Note	%±
2000	1,823		—
2010	1,683		−7.7%
2020	1,613		−4.2%
U.S. Decennial Census

== School districts ==
- Crescent Iroquois Community Unit School District 249
- Iroquois West Community Unit School District 10

== Political districts ==
- Illinois' 15th congressional district
- State House District 105
- State Senate District 53
