= Donovan, Illinois =

- Village
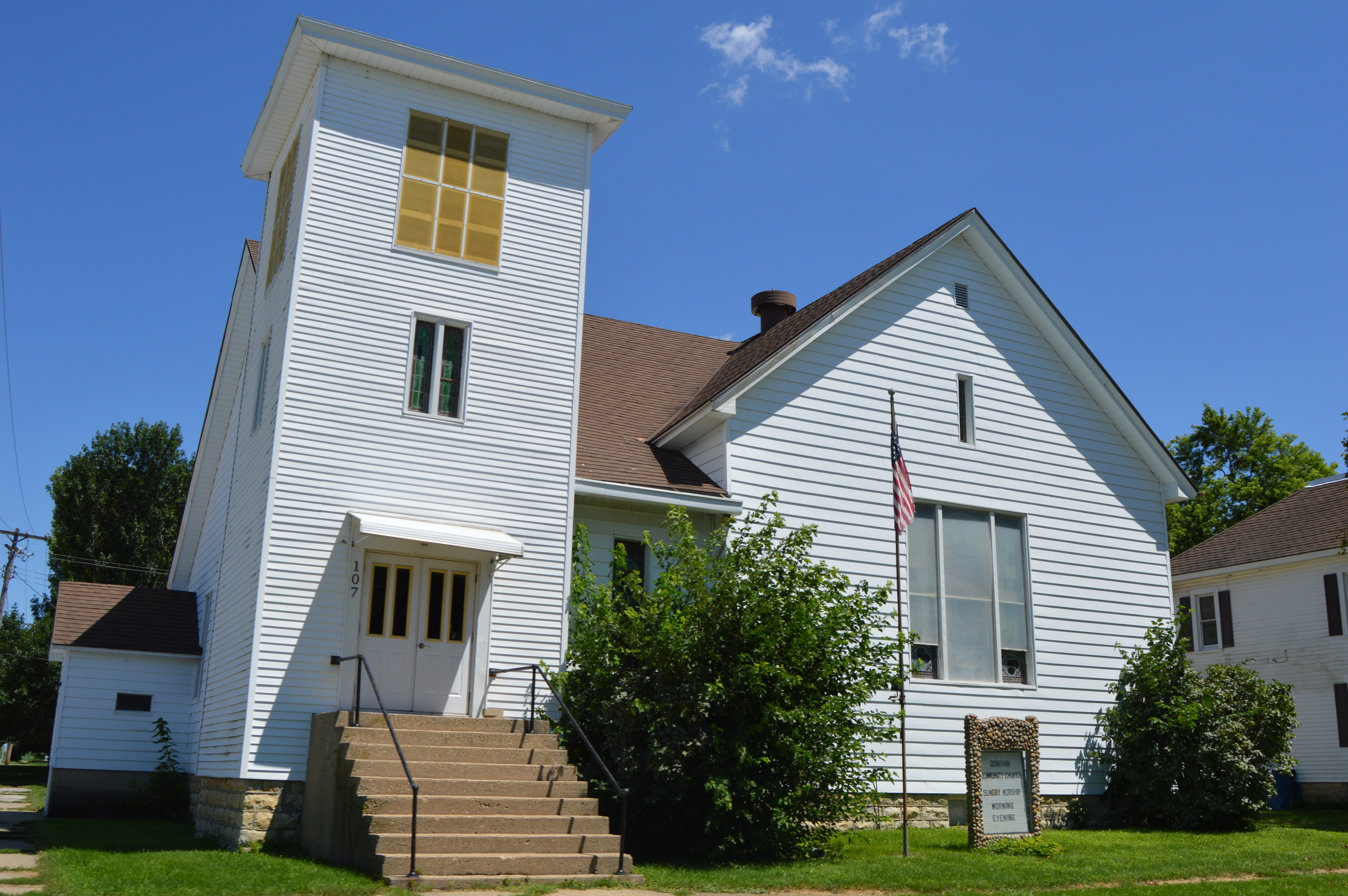
- Donovan Community Church on Raub Avenue

- Location of Donovan in Iroquois County, Illinois

- Location in Iroquois County
- Coordinates: 40°53′06″N 87°36′50″W
- Country: United States
- State: Illinois
- County: Iroquois
- Township: Beaver

Area
  - Total: 0.33 sq mi (0.85 km^{2})
  - Land: 0.33 sq mi (0.85 km^{2})
  - Water: 0 sq mi (0.00 km^{2})
- Elevation: 676 ft (206 m)

Population (2020)
  - Total: 251
  - Density: 766.0/sq mi (295.75/km^{2})
- Time zone: UTC-6 (CST)
  - Summer (DST): UTC-5 (CDT)
- ZIP code: 60931
- Area code: 815
- FIPS code: 17-20331
- GNIS ID(s): 2398739

Donovan is a village in Beaver Township, Iroquois County, Illinois, United States. The population was 251 at the 2020 census.

== History ==
Donovan was laid out in 1872 and named for the local Donovan family.

== Geography ==
Donovan is located in northeastern Iroquois County. U.S. Route 52 passes through the village, leading west and north 30 miles (48 km) to Kankakee and southeast 14 miles (23 km) to Kentland, Indiana.

According to the 2021 census gazetteer files, Donovan has a total area of 0.33 square miles (0.85 km^{2}), all land.

== Demographics ==
Historical population
Census	Pop.	Note	%±
1880	176		—
1910	346		—
1920	410		18.5%
1930	375		−8.5%
1940	381		1.6%
1950	327		−14.2%
1960	320		−2.1%
1970	343		7.2%
1980	301		−12.2%
1990	361		19.9%
2000	351		−2.8%
2010	304		−13.4%
2020	251		−17.4%
U.S. Decennial Census

As of the 2020 census there were 251 people, 99 households, and 64 families residing in the village. The population density was 765.24 inhabitants per square mile (295.46/km^{2}). There were 126 housing units at an average density of 384.15 per square mile (148.32/km^{2}). The racial makeup of the village was 96.02% White, 0.00% African American, 0.00% Native American, 0.00% Asian, 0.00% Pacific Islander, 0.00% from other races, and 3.98% from two or more races. Hispanic or Latino of any race were 1.59% of the population.

There were 99 households, out of which 39.4% had children under the age of 18 living with them, 39.39% were married couples living together, 14.14% had a female householder with no husband present, and 35.35% were non-families. 27.27% of all households were made up of individuals, and 15.15% had someone living alone who was 65 years of age or older. The average household size was 3.31 and the average family size was 2.75.

The village's age distribution consisted of 29.4% under the age of 18, 12.1% from 18 to 24, 20.6% from 25 to 44, 28.7% from 45 to 64, and 9.2% who were 65 years of age or older. The median age was 38.5 years. For every 100 females, there were 114.2 males. For every 100 females age 18 and over, there were 125.9 males.

The median income for a household in the village was $37,083, and the median income for a family was $35,000. Males had a median income of $32,344 versus $24,167 for females. The per capita income for the village was $16,290. About 14.1% of families and 17.4% of the population were below the poverty line, including 13.7% of those under age 18 and 8.0% of those age 65 or over.
