= Danforth Township, Iroquois County, Illinois =

Danforth Township
- Township
- Location in Iroquois County

- Iroquois County's location in Illinois
- Coordinates: 40°49′03″N 88°00′22″W
- Country: United States
- State: Illinois
- County: Iroquois
- Established: Before 1921

Area
  - Total: 51.65 sq mi (133.8 km^{2})
  - Land: 51.65 sq mi (133.8 km^{2})
  - Water: 0 sq mi (0 km^{2}) 0%
- Elevation: 653 ft (199 m)

Population (2020)
  - Total: 883
  - Density: 17.1/sq mi (6.60/km^{2})
- Time zone: UTC-6 (CST)
  - Summer (DST): UTC-5 (CDT)
- ZIP codes: 60911, 60930, 60938, 60970
- FIPS code: 17-075-18511

Danforth Township is one of twenty-six townships in Iroquois County, Illinois, USA. As of the 2020 census, its population was 883 and it contained 367 housing units.

== History ==
Danforth Township was named for George M. Danforth, an early settler. Danforth Township formed from Douglas Township and Ashkum Township sometime before 1921.

== Geography ==
According to the 2021 census gazetteer files, Danforth Township has a total area of 51.65 square miles (133.77 km^{2}), all land.

=== Cities, towns, villages ===
- Danforth

=== Cemeteries ===
The township contains Bardon Cemetery.

=== Major highways ===
- Interstate 57
- U.S. Route 45

=== Airports and landing strips ===
- Classen Field RLA Airport
- Wilken Airport

== Demographics ==
As of the 2020 census there were 883 people, 326 households, and 193 families residing in the township. The population density was 17.10 inhabitants per square mile (6.60/km^{2}). There were 367 housing units at an average density of 7.11 per square mile (2.75/km^{2}). The racial makeup of the township was 95.70% White, 0.00% African American, 0.11% Native American, 0.00% Asian, 0.00% Pacific Islander, 0.79% from other races, and 3.40% from two or more races. Hispanic or Latino of any race were 2.27% of the population.

There were 326 households, out of which 35.90% had children under the age of 18 living with them, 48.16% were married couples living together, 2.76% had a female householder with no spouse present, and 40.80% were non-families. 34.70% of all households were made up of individuals, and 21.20% had someone living alone who was 65 years of age or older. The average household size was 2.35 and the average family size was 3.03.

The township's age distribution consisted of 22.8% under the age of 18, 5.6% from 18 to 24, 22.3% from 25 to 44, 15.6% from 45 to 64, and 33.8% who were 65 years of age or older. The median age was 44.6 years. For every 100 females, there were 86.8 males. For every 100 females age 18 and over, there were 93.5 males.

The median income for a household in the township was $51,250, and the median income for a family was $57,798. Males had a median income of $34,125 versus $17,500 for females. The per capita income for the township was $23,894. About 16.1% of families and 17.1% of the population were below the poverty line, including 18.6% of those under age 18 and 5.8% of those age 65 or over.

Historical population
Census	Pop.	Note	%±
2000	912		—
2010	928		1.8%
2020	883		−4.8%
U.S. Decennial Census

== School districts ==
- Iroquois West Community Unit School District 10

== Political districts ==
- Illinois' 15th congressional district
- State House District 75
- State House District 105
- State Senate District 38
- State Senate District 53
