= Onarga, Illinois =

- Village
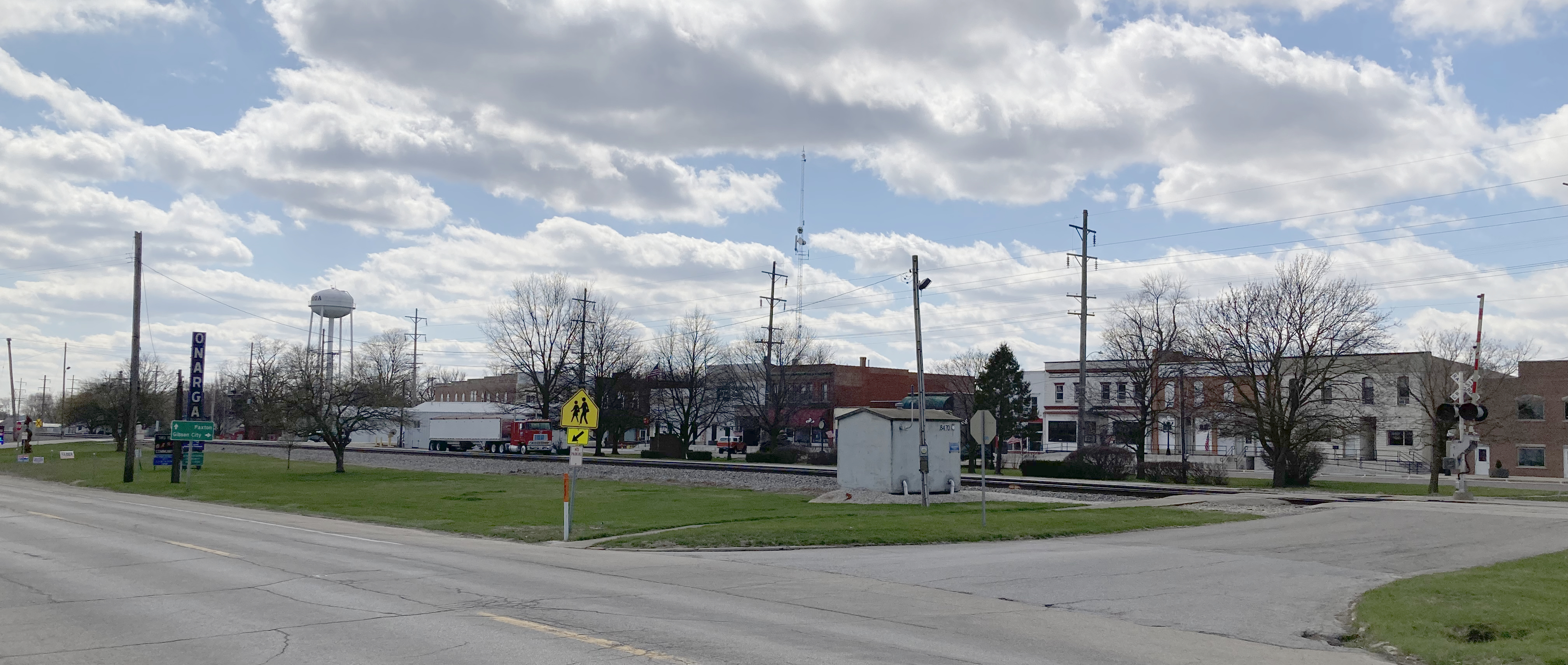
- View from the northeast

- Location in Iroquois County, Illinois

- Location in Iroquois County
- Coordinates: 40°43′00″N 88°00′18″W
- Country: United States
- State: Illinois
- County: Iroquois
- Township: Onarga
- Founded: 1854

Area
  - Total: 1.67 sq mi (4.33 km^{2})
  - Land: 1.67 sq mi (4.33 km^{2})
  - Water: 0 sq mi (0.00 km^{2})
- Elevation: 676 ft (206 m)

Population (2020)
  - Total: 1,333
  - Density: 796/sq mi (307.5/km^{2})
- Time zone: UTC-6 (CST)
  - Summer (DST): UTC-5 (CDT)
- ZIP code: 60955
- Area code: 815
- FIPS code: 17-56081
- GNIS feature ID: 2399574
- Website: villageofonarga.com

Onarga is a village in Onarga Township, Iroquois County, Illinois, United States. The population was 1,333 at the 2020 census.

== History ==
Onarga was originally laid out in the mid-19th century alongside the development of the railroad from Chicago. Because of its close proximity to Spring Creek, Onarga was one of the first settled areas of Iroquois County. The town grew rapidly but it leveled off and it now maintains small population.

The name Onarga likely comes from an Iroquois name meaning "a place of rocky hills."

Onarga has tree and shrub nurseries that have been in business for over 100 years, earning Onarga the nickname, "The Nursery Capital of the Midwest." Many fields surrounding the town bear rows of trees and bushes rather than corn and soybeans, which are otherwise ubiquitous throughout the region. The prosperous nursery businesses have led to a great amount of ethnic diversity in Onarga, as many Mexican and Mexican-American migrant workers have chosen to maintain roots in the community.

Onarga celebrated its sesquicentennial with a nearly week-long festival in the summer of 2004, which included social events and a strong focus on the history of the community.

Onarga is the final resting place of Civil War spy and Pinkerton detective Timothy Webster. Onarga was also the location of Allan Pinkerton's weekend estate, The Larches.

== Geography ==
Onarga is located in western Iroquois County. U.S. Route 45 passes through the center of the village, leading north 4 miles (6 km) to Gilman and south 8 miles (13 km) to Buckley. Interstate 57 runs along the western border of the village, with access from Exit 280. I-57 leads north 31 miles (50 km) to Kankakee and south 46 miles (74 km) to Champaign. Chicago is 90 miles (140 km) to the north via I-57.

According to the 2021 census gazetteer files, Onarga has a total area of 1.67 square miles (4.33 km^{2}), all land.

=== Climate ===
Onarga has a hot-summer humid continental climate (Dfa) characterized by four distinct seasons. Winters are cold, with frequent snowfall and temperatures occasionally dropping to as low as -10 °F to -20 °F. Average high temperatures from late December through late February typically range from the mid-30s to upper 30s. Spring is generally mild but often marked by rain, wind, and cloudy skies, with high temperatures increasing from the 50s in late March to the 80s by early June. Summers are hot and humid, frequently accompanied by brief but intense thunderstorms. Average summer high temperatures are in the mid to upper 80s, with occasional highs in the lower 90s. Autumns are cooler and drier, with the first frost usually occurring by mid to late October. Onarga's summer conditions are particularly favorable for cultivating corn and soybeans, which dominate the surrounding rural landscape. The area receives an average annual precipitation of 40.44 inches.

== Business ==
Onarga has a golf course, several restaurants, and Lake Arrowhead. The only movie theater in Iroquois County is in Onarga.

Historical population
Census	Pop.	Note	%±
1880	1,061		—
1890	994		−6.3%
1900	1,270		27.8%
1910	1,273		0.2%
1920	1,302		2.3%
1930	1,469		12.8%
1940	1,413		−3.8%
1950	1,455		3.0%
1960	1,397		−4.0%
1970	1,436		2.8%
1980	1,269		−11.6%
1990	1,281		0.9%
2000	1,438		12.3%
2010	1,368		−4.9%
2020	1,333		−2.6%
U.S. Decennial Census

== Demographics ==
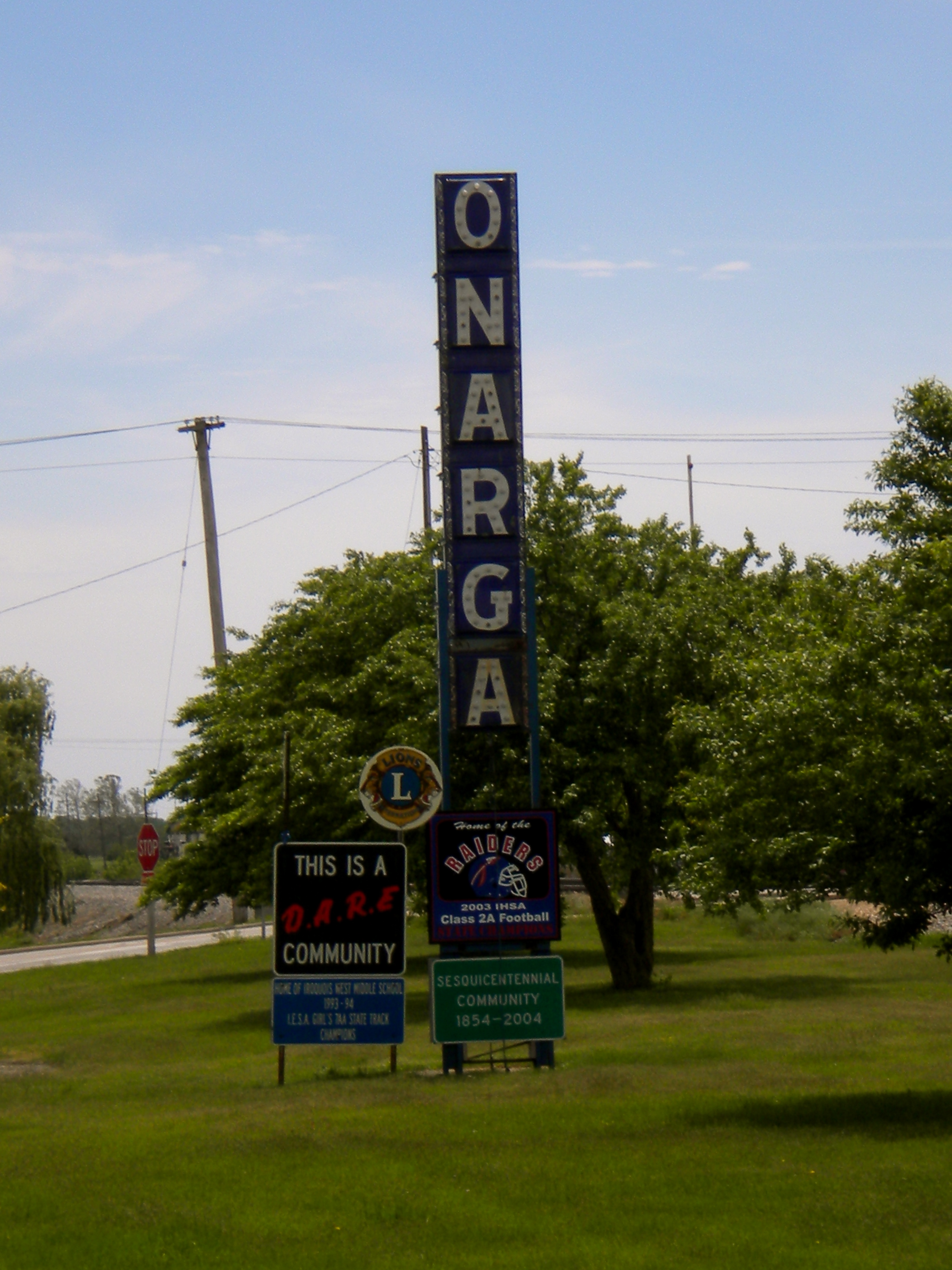
Onarga welcome sign

=== 2020 census ===
As of the 2020 census, Onarga had a population of 1,333. The median age was 35.6 years; 28.2% of residents were under the age of 18 and 14.9% were 65 years of age or older. For every 100 females, there were 104.8 males, and for every 100 females age 18 and over, there were 99.4 males age 18 and over.

The age distribution included 10.6% from 18 to 24, 20.2% from 25 to 44, and 25.9% from 45 to 64.

0.0% of residents lived in urban areas, while 100.0% lived in rural areas.

There were 450 households in Onarga, of which 35.1% had children under the age of 18 living in them. Of all households, 57.3% were married-couple households, 14.0% were households with a male householder and no spouse or partner present, and 23.1% were households with a female householder and no spouse or partner present. About 22.4% of all households were made up of individuals, and 11.3% had someone living alone who was 65 years of age or older. The average household size was 3.40 and the average family size was 2.71.

There were 493 housing units, of which 8.7% were vacant. The homeowner vacancy rate was 3.1% and the rental vacancy rate was 8.9%. The population density was 796.30 inhabitants per square mile (307.45/km^{2}), and housing density was 294.50 per square mile (113.71/km^{2}).

Racial composition as of the 2020 census
Race	Number	Percent
White	754	56.6%
Black or African American	20	1.5%
American Indian and Alaska Native	6	0.5%
Asian	7	0.5%
Native Hawaiian and Other Pacific Islander	0	0.0%
Some other race	296	22.2%
Two or more races	250	18.8%
Hispanic or Latino (of any race)	662	49.7%

=== Income and poverty ===
The median income for a household in the village was $48,024, and the median income for a family was $54,896. Males had a median income of $31,821 versus $26,563 for females. The per capita income for the village was $19,380. About 16.5% of families and 18.0% of the population were below the poverty line, including 22.5% of those under age 18 and 19.5% of those age 65 or over.

== See also ==
- List of municipalities in Illinois
