= Ash Grove Township, Iroquois County, Illinois =

Ash Grove Township
- Township
- Location in Iroquois County

- Iroquois County's location in Illinois
- Coordinates: 40°37′06″N 87°50′37″W
- Country: United States
- State: Illinois
- County: Iroquois
- Established: November 6, 1855

Area
  - Total: 61.09 sq mi (158.2 km^{2})
  - Land: 61.03 sq mi (158.1 km^{2})
  - Water: 0.06 sq mi (0.16 km^{2}) 0.10%
- Elevation: 669 ft (204 m)

Population (2020)
  - Total: 657
  - Density: 10.8/sq mi (4.16/km^{2})
- Time zone: UTC-6 (CST)
  - Summer (DST): UTC-5 (CDT)
- ZIP codes: 60924, 60926, 60953, 60955
- FIPS code: 17-075-02453

Ash Grove Township is one of twenty-six townships in Iroquois County, Illinois, United States. As of the 2020 census, its population was 657 and it contained 304 housing units.

== History ==
The first settler in the area that became Ash Grove Township was Robert Roberts, who arrived in 1833. The township was formed when township government was adopted by the county in 1855. Its current borders were established on September 15, 1868, when Fountain Creek Township was formed from a portion of Ash Grove Township.

== Geography ==
According to the 2021 census gazetteer files, Ash Grove Township has a total area of 61.09 square miles (158.22 km^{2}), of which 61.03 square miles (158.07 km^{2}) (or 99.90%) is land and 0.06 square miles (0.16 km^{2}) (or 0.10%) is water.

=== Unincorporated towns ===
- Pitchin at 40.603091°N 87.866423°W
- Schwer at 40.660592°N 87.788088°W
- Woodworth at 40.659758°N 87.845867°W

(This list is based on USGS data and may include former settlements.)

=== Cemeteries ===
The township contains these six cemeteries: Cochrans Grove Cemetery (aka Ash Grove Cemetery), Cissna Park, Immanuel Lutheran, Saint John's Ash Grove, Saint Paul Lutheran and Schwer.

=== Major highways ===
- Illinois Route 49

=== Airports and landing strips ===
- Redeker Airport

== Demographics ==
As of the 2020 census there were 657 people, 212 households, and 157 families residing in the township. The population density was 10.75 inhabitants per square mile (4.15/km^{2}). There were 304 housing units at an average density of 4.98 per square mile (1.92/km^{2}). The racial makeup of the township was 95.59% White, 0.00% African American, 0.00% Native American, 0.30% Asian, 0.00% Pacific Islander, 0.61% from other races, and 3.50% from two or more races. Hispanic or Latino of any race were 2.13% of the population.

There were 212 households, out of which 45.30% had children under the age of 18 living with them, 64.62% were married couples living together, 8.02% had a female householder with no spouse present, and 25.94% were non-families. 20.30% of all households were made up of individuals, and 11.80% had someone living alone who was 65 years of age or older. The average household size was 3.44 and the average family size was 3.82.

The township's age distribution consisted of 41.0% under the age of 18, 7.5% from 18 to 24, 24% from 25 to 44, 19.4% from 45 to 64, and 8.1% who were 65 years of age or older. The median age was 26.3 years. For every 100 females, there were 135.9 males. For every 100 females age 18 and over, there were 100.9 males.

The median income for a household in the township was $70,000, and the median income for a family was $72,344. Males had a median income of $41,607 versus $21,591 for females. The per capita income for the township was $22,219. About 10.8% of families and 9.5% of the population were below the poverty line, including 3.4% of those under age 18 and 8.5% of those age 65 or over.

Historical population
Census	Pop.	Note	%±
2000	797		—
2010	731		−8.3%
2020	657		−10.1%
U.S. Decennial Census

== School districts ==
- Cissna Park Community Unit School District 6
- Crescent Iroquois Community Unit School District 249
- Iroquois West Community Unit School District 10
- Paxton-Buckley-Loda Community Unit School District 10

== Political districts ==
- Illinois' 15th congressional district
- State House District 105
- State Senate District 53
