= Lindsay Parkhurst =

American politician

Member of the Illinois House of Representatives from the 79th district
- In office January 2017 – December 2020
- Preceded by: Kate Cloonen
- Succeeded by: Jackie Haas

Personal details
- Party: Republican
- Education: Chicago-Kent College of Law (J.D.); DePaul University (L.L.M.); University of Illinois (B.A.)
- Profession: Attorney

Lindsay Parkhurst is a Circuit Judge in the 21st Judicial Circuit of the Illinois Circuit Courts. She was previously a Republican member of the Illinois House of Representatives, representing the 79th District from 2017 to 2020. The 79th district includes all or parts of Kankakee, Bourbonnais, Bradley, Essex, Hopkins Park, Peotone, Herscher and Braceville.

She is a Kankakee native and an attorney who earned her degrees at University of Illinois Urbana-Champaign, Chicago-Kent College of Law and DePaul University College of Law.

During her tenure she was assigned to the following committees: Appropriations: General Service; Appropriations: Elementary and Secondary Education; Judiciary: Civil; Judiciary: Criminal; Transportation: Regulation, Roads Restorative Justice; Domestic Relations Law Subcommittee; Tort Liability Law Subcommittee; Juvenile Justice; System Involve

On November 14, 2019, Parkhurst announced via Facebook that she would not run for reelection in 2020. She ran for a Circuit Judge position unopposed in the 2020 General Election. She resigned the Illinois House and was sworn in a judge on December 7, 2020. One day after being sworn in a judge, she administered the oath to her successor, and Republican Representative-elect Jackie M. Haas was sworn in on December 8, 2020.
