= Kate Cloonen =

American politician

Member of the Illinois House of Representatives from the 79th district
- In office January 2013 – January 2017
- Preceded by: Lisa M. Dugan
- Succeeded by: Lindsay Parkhurst

Personal details
- Born: July 9, 1954 (age 72)
- Party: Democratic
- Education: National College of Education; Ball State University
- Profession: Small Business Owner; Teacher

Kate Cloonen (born July 9, 1954) is a former Democratic member of the Illinois House of Representatives, representing the 79th District from 2013 to 2017. The 79th district includes all or parts of Kankakee, Bourbonnais, Bradley, Essex, Hopkins Park, Peotone, Herscher and Braceville.
