= Essex Township, Illinois =

Essex Township, Illinois may refer to:

- Essex Township, Kankakee County, Illinois
- Essex Township, Stark County, Illinois

== See also ==
- Essex Township (disambiguation)
