= Union Hill, Illinois =

- Village
- Location of Union Hill in Kankakee County, Illinois

- Location of Illinois in the United States
- Coordinates: 41°06′28″N 88°08′46″W
- Country: United States
- State: Illinois
- County: Kankakee
- Township: Norton

Area
  - Total: 0.046 sq mi (0.12 km^{2})
  - Land: 0.046 sq mi (0.12 km^{2})
  - Water: 0 sq mi (0.00 km^{2})
- Elevation: 617 ft (188 m)

Population (2020)
  - Total: 55
  - Density: 1,192/sq mi (460.2/km^{2})
- Time zone: UTC-6 (CST)
  - Summer (DST): UTC-5 (CDT)
- ZIP code: 60969
- Area codes: 815 & 779
- FIPS code: 17-76771
- GNIS feature ID: 2400024
- Wikimedia Commons: Union Hill, Illinois
- Website: villageofunionhill.org

Union Hill is a village in Kankakee County, Illinois, United States. The population was 55 at the 2020 census, down from 58 in 2010. It is included in the Kankakee-Bradley, Illinois Metropolitan Statistical Area.

== History ==
The settlement of the town is credited to brothers Cornelius and John E. Schobey. With the second believed to be the town's founder when he moved to neighboring Essex Township in 1854. John Schobey opened a post office in 1861 during the start of the civil war. This inspired Mr. Schobey to make it so the settlements name had the word "union" included. After some trial and error the area became known as Union Hill around the same time. The Indiana, Illinois and Iowa Railroad (now the Kankakee Belt Route) was built through the area in 1882, which triggered the expansion of the town.

Union Hill was possibly incorporated as a village in 1903 or 1904.

== Geography ==
Union Hill is located in western Kankakee County. It is 15 miles (24 km) west of Kankakee, the county seat, and 6 miles (10 km) northwest of Herscher.

According to the 2021 census gazetteer files, Union Hill has a total area of 0.05 square miles (0.13 km^{2}), all land.

== Demographics ==
Historical population
Census	Pop.	Note	%±
1950	138		—
1960	80		−42.0%
1970	85		6.3%
1980	82		−3.5%
1990	37		−54.9%
2000	66		78.4%
2010	58		−12.1%
2020	55		−5.2%
U.S. Decennial Census

As of the 2020 census there were 55 people, 23 households, and 18 families residing in the village. The population density was 1,195.65 inhabitants per square mile (461.64/km^{2}). There were 27 housing units at an average density of 586.96 per square mile (226.63/km^{2}). The racial makeup of the village was 96.36% White, 0.00% African American, 0.00% Native American, 0.00% Asian, 0.00% Pacific Islander, 0.00% from other races, and 3.64% from two or more races. Hispanic or Latino of any race were 3.64% of the population.

There were 23 households, out of which 65.2% had children under the age of 18 living with them, 56.52% were married couples living together, 4.35% had a female householder with no husband present, and 21.74% were non-families. 21.74% of all households were made up of individuals, and none had someone living alone who was 65 years of age or older. The average household size was 3.50 and the average family size was 3.00.

The village's age distribution consisted of 39.1% under the age of 18, 15.9% from 18 to 24, 31.9% from 25 to 44, 11.5% from 45 to 64, and 1.4% who were 65 years of age or older. The median age was 22.8 years. For every 100 females, there were 155.6 males. For every 100 females age 18 and over, there were 147.1 males.

The median income for a household in the village was $64,688, and the median income for a family was $68,750. Males had a median income of $32,188 versus $35,938 for females. The per capita income for the village was $24,014. No families and 2.9% of the population were below the poverty line, including none of those under age 18 and none of those age 65 or over.
