= Lemuel Milk =

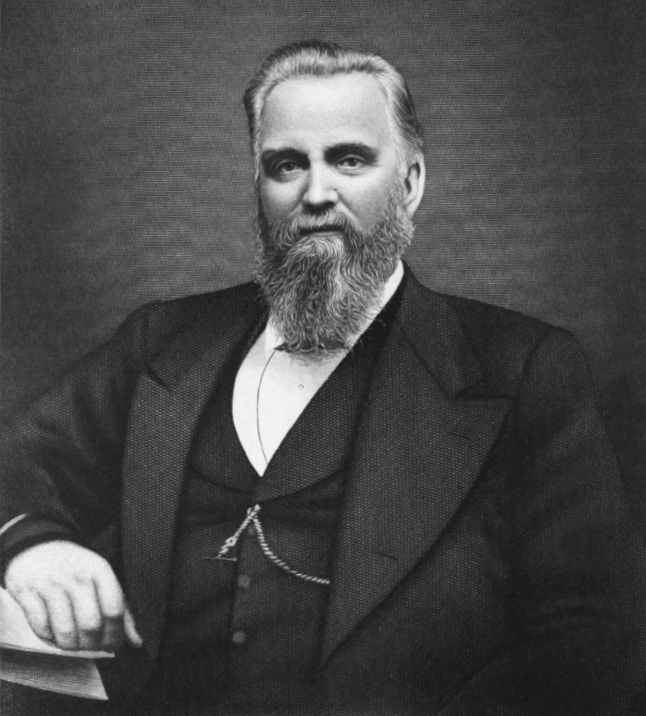
- Born: October 18, 1820; Ledyard, New York
- Died: July 19, 1893 (aged 72); Kankakee, Illinois
- Occupations: Farmer, businessman
- Spouses: Jane A. Platt (m. 1854; died 1881) May E. Sherwood (m. 1886)

Lemuel Milk (1820–1893) was an early settler to Eastern Illinois and, at one point, the largest landholder in the state. Born in New York, Milk came to Illinois after purchasing a large tract of land in Iroquois County. Milk came to own over 25,000 acres (10,000 ha) of land in Illinois, Indiana, and North Dakota. He also found success with a general store in Chebanse, Illinois and an ice harvesting company in Kankakee, Illinois. Milk is the namesake of Milks Grove Township, Iroquois County, Illinois.

== Biography ==
Lemuel Milk was born in Ledyard, New York on October 18, 1820. When he was two years old, his family moved to Fleming, New York, where Milk was raised. His parents, natives of Massachusetts, operated a farm in town. Milk took an early interest in the farm and helped his parents manage it as a child. By the time that Milk reached adulthood, he was managing his parents' farm and soon purchased the adjoining farm. He traded in horses, sheep, cattle, and swine.

Milk became a protege of Col. William Howard, a prominent local livestock trader. Howard often took trips to Ohio, Indiana, and Illinois to purchase livestock for eastern markets. In 1850, during one of these trips, Howard identified a prime tract of land in Iroquois County, Illinois. Milk trusted Howard's judgment and decided to purchase a half interest in the tract from the government. Once Milk came to his new land, he decided to sell all of his eastern interests and focus on developing the tract. Howard died in 1853 and Milk purchased the rest of the share of the land from his heirs. He also purchased adjacent tracts of land, eventually accumulating 9,000 acres (3,600 ha) in the county. Milk permanently moved to Illinois after his marriage to Jane A. Platt on June 1, 1854.

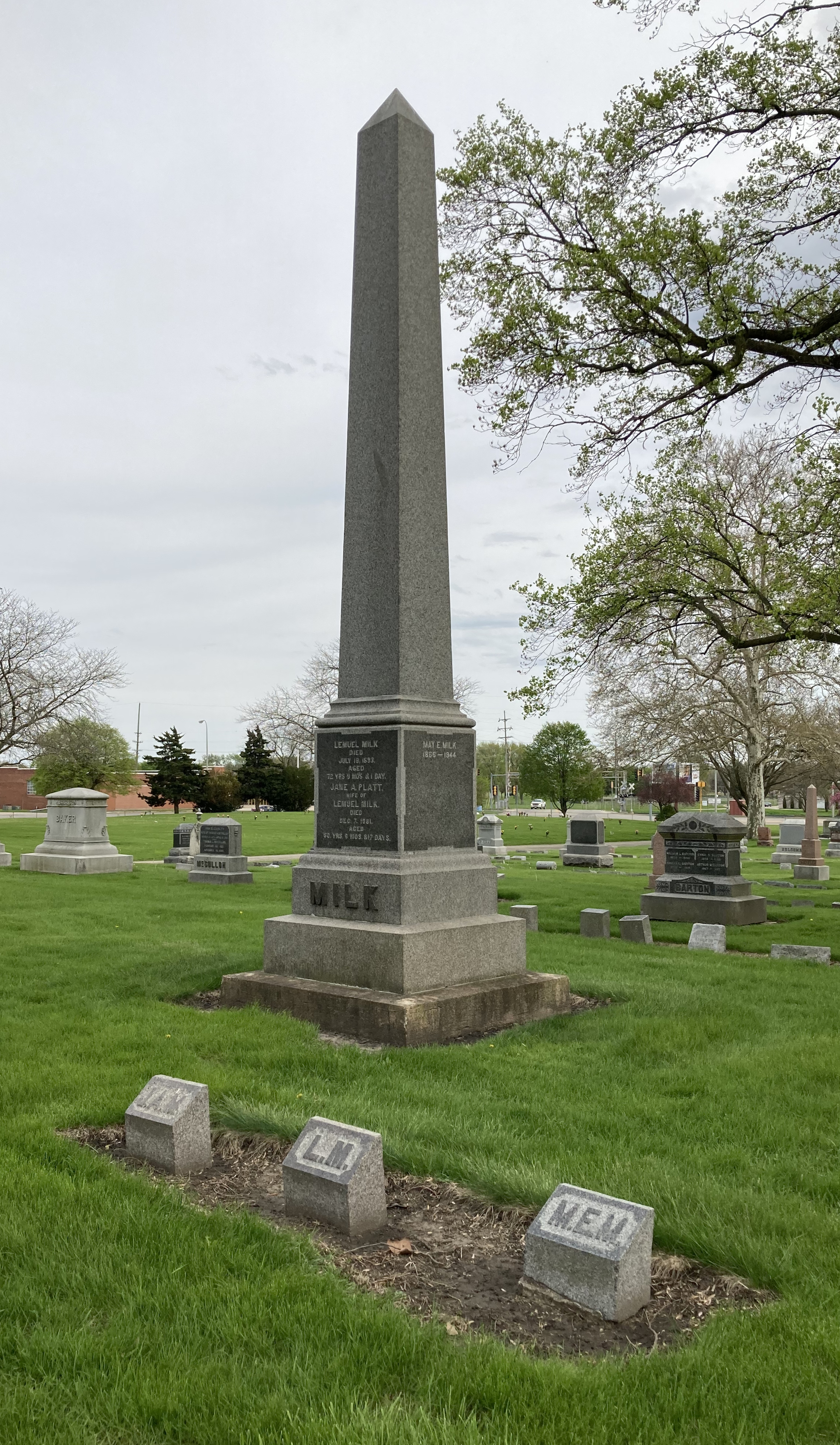
Milk's grave at Mound Grove Cemetery

Milk chose a location on the Kankakee River for his homestead. In 1868, he opened a general store in Chebanse, Illinois, which he oversaw until selling his interest in 1883. He continued to expand his holdings until he owned over 25,000 acres (10,000 ha) over one hundred and fifty farms, making him the largest landowner in the state. Milk specialized in raising Hereford cattle and Percheron horses. In the late 1870s, Milk founded the Waldron Ice Company, which harvested ice from the Kankakee River. Milk was President of the Mound City Cemetery in Kankakee, Illinois from 1882 until his death. Milk's most ambitious undertaking was to purchase and drain Beaver Lake in Newton County, Indiana. However, this move was rejected by the state, who argued that they only sold the shoreline to the lake and not the entire property. In Indiana vs. Milk, the Indiana Supreme Court ruled that the state also sold the land under the lake in the transaction.

Widowed in 1881, Milk remarried on November 30, 1886, to May E. Sherwood, a cousin of his first wife. Late in his life, Milk accumulated property in North Dakota. Milk served on the board of trustees for the Illinois Eastern Hospital for the Insane from 1884 to 1886. While there, he was part of the jury that determined that Elizabeth Packard was sane and should be released from the facility.

Lemuel Milk died at his home in Kankakee on July 19, 1893. His estate has since been largely demolished; only his former carriage house remains. It was listed on the National Register of Historic Places on June 4, 1979.

Milk is the namesake of Milks Grove Township in Iroquois County.
