= Reddick, Illinois =

- Village
- Location of Reddick in Kankakee County, Illinois
- Coordinates: 41°05′54″N 88°14′59″W
- Country: United States
- State: Illinois
- Counties: Kankakee, Livingston
- Townships: Norton, Round Grove

Area
  - Total: 0.24 sq mi (0.62 km^{2})
  - Land: 0.24 sq mi (0.62 km^{2})
  - Water: 0 sq mi (0.00 km^{2})
- Elevation: 610 ft (190 m)

Population (2020)
  - Total: 199
  - Density: 834.3/sq mi (322.11/km^{2})
- Time zone: UTC-6 (CST)
  - Summer (DST): UTC-5 (CDT)
- ZIP code: 60961
- Area codes: 815 & 779
- FIPS code: 17-63056
- GNIS feature ID: 2399052

Reddick is a village in Kankakee County, Illinois, United States. A small portion of the village extends into Livingston County. The population was 199 at the 2020 census.

The Kankakee County portion of Reddick is included in the Kankakee-Bradley, Illinois Metropolitan Statistical Area, while the small Livingston County portion is part of the Pontiac Micropolitan Statistical Area.

As of 1988, children living in the village and surrounding area attend schools in Herscher School District #2.

== History ==
Originally known as Reddick Station, the village of Reddick was platted in 1880 and incorporated in 1890 with a population of 400. By 1895, business enterprises included a tile factory, two grain elevators, a millinery and dressmaker shop, a general store, a livery stable, two hotels, lumber and coal businesses, a barber shop, blacksmith, and others. All of the land around Reddick was plotted into sections, divided into quarter sections equaling 160 acres (65 ha) each, and usually tilled by one family.

Two railroads were constructed about 1879, forming an intersection where Reddick now stands. The Wabash, St. Louis & Pacific Railroad went from Chicago to St. Louis. The second railroad ran east and west and was called the "Three I" or Illinois, Indiana, and Iowa Railroad, later the New York Central. At this railroad intersection, a business center for the rich agricultural community was developed. Because the portion of land south of the crosstracks seemed to be best due to drainage, the new settlers began building there. This placed Reddick in Norton Township in Kankakee County.

Coal was discovered under the land north of Reddick in the 1860s. Railroad spurs were built around 1888 to coal mine towns near Reddick: Clarke City, Oklahoma, Tracy, and Cardiff, but by 1918, all four were ghost towns. Strip mining was performed north of Reddick between 1950 and 1974. The first Reddick Electric Plant was opened in 1906. The General Telephone Company, originally organized as a farmer's cooperative, still required the services of an operator to switch calls until 1964.

The first school in the village was constructed in 1902 and consisted of two rooms and a library, and employed two teachers. By 1906, the library was converted into another classroom, a third teacher was hired, and a two-year high school was established. In 1915, a four-year high school course was added. In 1919 Reddick Community High School was organized, and a new building was constructed in 1921. The grade school was remodeled in 1949 and 1974. Children attended the Reddick School District, known better as "RUCE", an acronym that consisted of the villages that were part of the school district (Reddick, Union Hill, Campus, and Essex). The Reddick High School Bulldogs, whose colors were orange and black, were known for their excellence in American football. In 1988 Reddick joined the Herscher School District. An addition was added to the grade school in approximately 1996 and the high school was torn down in 1998 due to wear from aging and asbestos. The Reddick Grade School building was utilized as one of the grade schools that served children of the Herscher School District for grades K – 6. This arrangement was changed to just grades 4 and 5 in 2005. Due to financial concerns, the Herscher School District decided to close the Reddick Grade School in the summer of 2013. In 2014, Herscher Community School District decided they no longer needed the school and sold it to the Reddick Fire Department. All children in the Reddick area now attend Bonfield, Limestone, or Herscher schools in the #2 school district.

In the 1980s, Highway 17, which led traffic through Reddick, was rerouted to bypass the village. The railroad tracks were removed and made into a bike trail in the early 1990s.

== Geography ==
Reddick is located in western Kankakee County and extends west into northeastern Livingston County.

According to the 2021 census gazetteer files, Reddick has a total area of 0.24 square miles (0.62 km^{2}), all land.

By road, Reddick is 74 miles (119 km) southwest of Chicago, 22 miles (35 km) west of Kankakee, and 32 miles (51 km) east of Streator. The soil of the land in and around Reddick consists of a heavy black loam with a clay sub-soil suitable for the growing of corn, oats, clover, and timothy hay. In 1865, farmland could be purchased for $2.00 an acre; by 1904, farm land was worth $110.00 to $200.00 per acre.

== Demographics ==
Historical population
Census	Pop.	Note	%±
1900	261		—
1910	288		10.3%
1920	239		−17.0%
1930	205		−14.2%
1940	194		−5.4%
1950	208		7.2%
1960	205		−1.4%
1970	247		20.5%
1980	243		−1.6%
1990	208		−14.4%
2000	219		5.3%
2010	163		−25.6%
2020	199		22.1%
U.S. Decennial Census

As of the 2020 census there were 199 people, 69 households, and 47 families residing in the village. The population density was 832.64 inhabitants per square mile (321.48/km^{2}). There were 81 housing units at an average density of 338.91 per square mile (130.85/km^{2}). The racial makeup of the village was 92.46% White, 1.51% African American, 0.00% Native American, 0.50% Asian, 0.00% Pacific Islander, 0.00% from other races, and 5.53% from two or more races. Hispanic or Latino of any race were 4.52% of the population.

There were 69 households, out of which 44.9% had children under the age of 18 living with them, 57.97% were married couples living together, 8.70% had a female householder with no husband present, and 31.88% were non-families. 23.19% of all households were made up of individuals, and 11.59% had someone living alone who was 65 years of age or older. The average household size was 3.87 and the average family size was 3.09.

The village's age distribution consisted of 30.5% under the age of 18, 11.3% from 18 to 24, 31.9% from 25 to 44, 13.1% from 45 to 64, and 13.1% who were 65 years of age or older. The median age was 30.3 years. For every 100 females, there were 180.3 males. For every 100 females age 18 and over, there were 142.6 males.

The median income for a household in the village was $63,125, and the median income for a family was $73,125. Males had a median income of $44,219 versus $23,750 for females. The per capita income for the village was $24,782. About 0.0% of families and 0.9% of the population were below the poverty line, including 0.0% of those under age 18 and 3.6% of those age 65 or over.
