= Pilot Township, Kankakee County, Illinois =

Pilot Township
- Township
- Location in Kankakee County

- Kankakee County's location in Illinois
- Coordinates: 41°03′31″N 88°04′21″W
- Country: United States
- State: Illinois
- County: Kankakee
- Established: March 11, 1857

Government
  - Supervisor: Timothy Feller

Area
  - Total: 49.44 sq mi (128.0 km^{2})
  - Land: 49.44 sq mi (128.0 km^{2})
  - Water: 0 sq mi (0 km^{2}) 0%
- Elevation: 663 ft (202 m)

Population (2020)
  - Total: 1,979
  - Density: 40.03/sq mi (15.46/km^{2})
- Time zone: UTC-6 (CST)
  - Summer (DST): UTC-5 (CDT)
- ZIP codes: 60901, 60913, 60917, 60922, 60941
- FIPS code: 17-091-59819

Pilot Township is one of seventeen townships in Kankakee County, Illinois, USA. As of the 2020 census, its population was 1,979 and it contained 842 housing units. It was formed from a portion of Salina Township on March 11, 1857.

== Geography ==
According to the 2021 census gazetteer files, Pilot Township has a total area of 49.44 square miles (128.05 km^{2}), all land.

=== Cities, towns, villages ===
- Herscher

=== Unincorporated towns ===
- Goodrich at 41.108921°N 88.058104°W
- Lehigh at 41.11031°N 88.018103°W

(This list is based on USGS data and may include former settlements.)

=== Extinct towns ===
- Pilot Center at 41.057532°N 88.075881°W

(These towns are listed as "historical" by the USGS.)

=== Adjacent townships ===
- Salina Township (north)
- Limestone Township (northeast)
- Otto Township (east)
- Chebanse Township, Iroquois County (southeast)
- Milks Grove Township, Iroquois County (south)
- Rogers Township, Ford County (southwest)
- Norton Township (west)
- Essex Township (northwest)

=== Cemeteries ===
The township contains these seven cemeteries: Grand Prairie, Grand Prairie United, Mount Hope, Pilot Center, Saint Peter and Paul, Trinity and Zion Lutheran.

== Demographics ==
As of the 2020 census there were 1,979 people, 887 households, and 621 families residing in the township. The population density was 40.03 inhabitants per square mile (15.46/km^{2}). There were 842 housing units at an average density of 17.03 per square mile (6.58/km^{2}). The racial makeup of the township was 92.77% White, 0.45% African American, 0.15% Native American, 0.35% Asian, 0.00% Pacific Islander, 0.81% from other races, and 5.46% from two or more races. Hispanic or Latino of any race were 3.34% of the population.

There were 887 households, out of which 26.60% had children under the age of 18 living with them, 57.84% were married couples living together, 7.67% had a female householder with no spouse present, and 29.99% were non-families. 26.80% of all households were made up of individuals, and 15.70% had someone living alone who was 65 years of age or older. The average household size was 2.57 and the average family size was 3.14.

The township's age distribution consisted of 22.8% under the age of 18, 7.6% from 18 to 24, 20.3% from 25 to 44, 21.1% from 45 to 64, and 28.2% who were 65 years of age or older. The median age was 43.8 years. For every 100 females, there were 106.3 males. For every 100 females age 18 and over, there were 90.8 males.

The median income for a household in the township was $80,150, and the median income for a family was $98,542. Males had a median income of $60,083 versus $37,051 for females. The per capita income for the township was $38,865. About 4.0% of families and 6.0% of the population were below the poverty line, including 7.2% of those under age 18 and 7.4% of those age 65 or over.

Historical population
Census	Pop.	Note	%±
2000	2,050		—
2010	2,086		1.8%
2020	1,979		−5.1%
U.S. Decennial Census

== Government ==
The township is governed by an elected Town Board of a Supervisor and four Trustees. The Township also has an elected Assessor, Clerk, Highway Commissioner and Supervisor. The Township Office is located at 366 East Kay, Herscher, IL 60941.

== Political districts ==
- Illinois's 11th congressional district
- State House District 75
- State Senate District 38

== School districts ==
- Herscher Community Unit School District 2
