= Lemuel Milk Carriage House =

- U.S. National Register of Historic Places
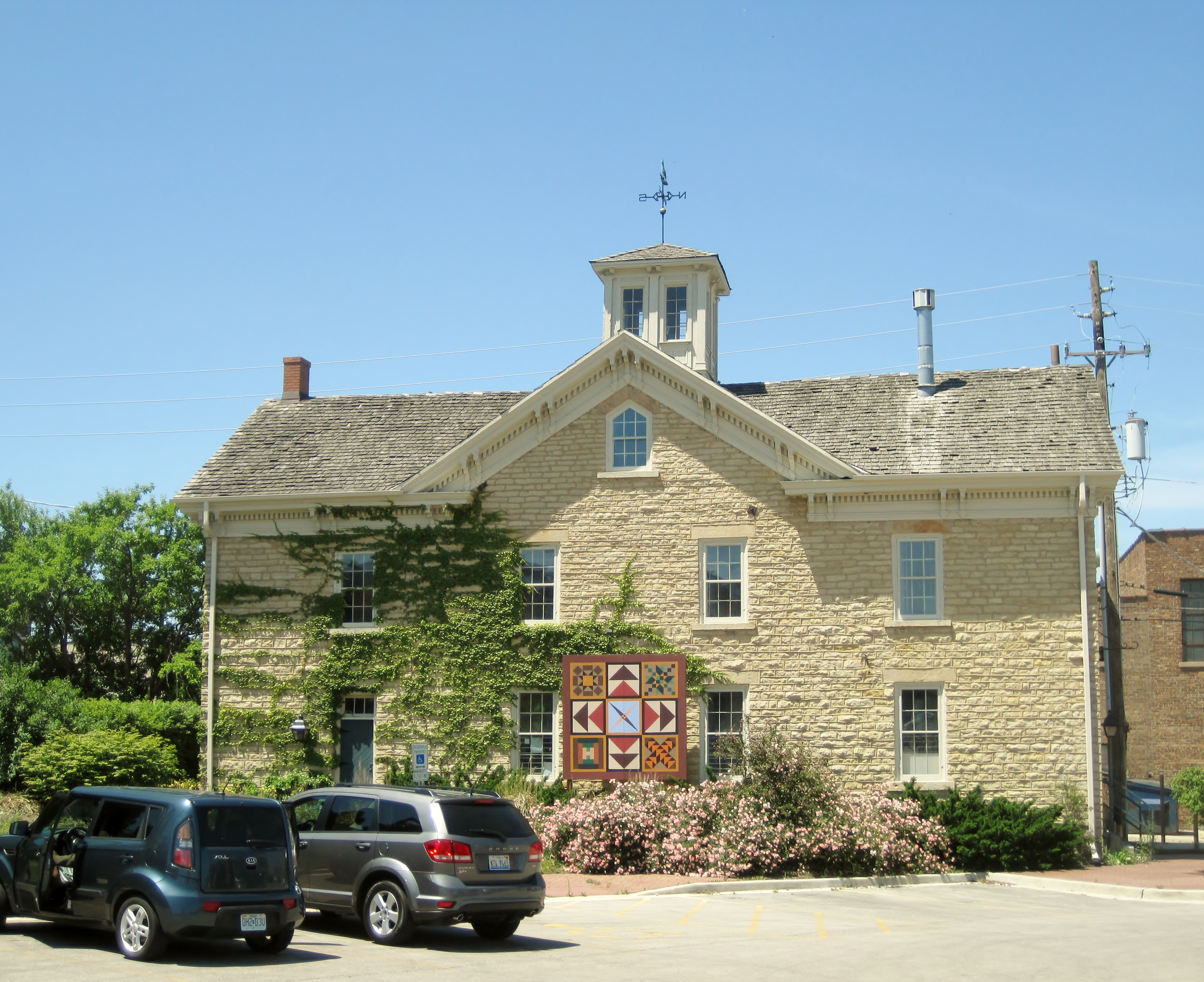

- Location within Illinois Location within the United States
- Location: 165 N. Indiana Ave., Kankakee, Illinois
- Coordinates: 41°7′16″N 87°51′41″W
- Area: less than one acre
- Built: c. 1865
- Architectural style: Italianate
- NRHP reference No.: 79000849
- Added to NRHP: June 4, 1979

The Lemuel Milk Carriage House or Stone Barn is a historic building in Kankakee, Illinois, United States. It is the last remnant of the estate of Lemuel Milk, who once owned over 25,000 acres (10,000 ha) of land.

== History ==
Lemuel Milk moved to Kankakee, Illinois from New York around 1855. An early settler to the area, Milk was among the first to drain the Kankakee region for farming. By purchasing cheap, swampy land for draining, Milk was able to amass a large estate exceeding 25,000 acres (10,000 ha). This made him one of the largest landowners in Illinois. Milk opened a department store in Chebanse in 1868, which he ran until 1883. In 1876, he founded the Waldron Ice Company, harvesting ice from the nearby Kankakee River. Milk was a trustee on the board of the Illinois Eastern Hospital for the Insane. Milk's most ambitious undertaking was the draining of Beaver Lake in Newton County, Indiana.

The carriage house, built at some point between 1861 and 1868, is the only remaining structure from Milk's large estate. Milk lived in a seventeen-room mansion at the corner of Oak and Indiana Avenues, which has since been demolished. Aside from sheltering his carriage, Milk also used the building to house livestock. The carriage house is now the third-oldest building remaining in Kankakee after the First Baptist Church and the Asbury United Methodist Church Sanctuary.

The building was used as a barn until the early 1920s, when it was used as a painting garage. It later became a warehouse for Fred Swannell Sr.'s hardware store. The building was converted to a bakery and restaurant in 1973. The restaurant quickly went out of business and the building became a meeting place for civic groups. On June 4, 1979, the carriage house was recognized by the National Park Service with a listing on the National Register of Historic Places.

== Architecture ==
The carriage house is built with locally quarried limestone. The roof features a cupola with a weather vane, placed at the crossing of the two gables. The building is largely undecorated except for a wide bracketed cornice. The interior retains its rough cut roof trusses. The floor was changed to concrete in the 1920s.
