= Bonfield, Illinois =

- Village
- Location of Bonfield in Illinois

- Location of Illinois in the United States
- Coordinates: 41°08′42″N 88°03′15″W
- Country: United States
- State: Illinois
- County: Kankakee
- Township: Salina

Area
  - Total: 0.49 sq mi (1.27 km^{2})
  - Land: 0.49 sq mi (1.27 km^{2})
  - Water: 0 sq mi (0.00 km^{2})
- Elevation: 623 ft (190 m)

Population (2020)
  - Total: 351
  - Density: 714/sq mi (275.6/km^{2})
- Time zone: UTC-6 (CST)
  - Summer (DST): UTC-5 (CDT)
- Postal code: 60913
- Area codes: 815 & 779
- FIPS code: 17-07237
- GNIS feature ID: 2398151
- Wikimedia Commons: Bonfield, Illinois
- Website: www.villageofbonfield.org

Bonfield is a village in Kankakee County, Illinois, United States. Bonfield's population was 351 at the 2020 census. It is included in the Kankakee-Bradley, Illinois Metropolitan Statistical Area.

Although founded by a quarryman, Thomas Verkler, the village was named after Thomas Bonfield, an attorney for the Kankakee & Seneca Railroad Company, which established a depot in the village. The railroad has long since disappeared into history but it had been on Johnson Street. Old railroad spikes and ties might still be found around the limestone quarry. The depot was moved about a mile and a half south of the village and converted to a barn, which remained in December 2007. The town had a high school, but it burned down in the early 1930s. Students then went to Herscher High School in Herscher.

== Geography ==
Bonfield is located in western Kankakee County and is 12 miles (19 km) west of Kankakee, the county seat.

According to the 2021 census gazetteer files, Bonfield has a total area of 0.49 square miles (1.27 km^{2}), all land.

== Demographics ==
Historical population
Census	Pop.	Note	%±
1890	150		—
1900	165		10.0%
1910	162		−1.8%
1920	126		−22.2%
1930	116		−7.9%
1940	116		0.0%
1950	143		23.3%
1960	178		24.5%
1970	241		35.4%
1980	294		22.0%
1990	299		1.7%
2000	364		21.7%
2010	382		4.9%
2020	351		−8.1%
U.S. Decennial Census

As of the 2020 census there were 351 people, 228 households, and 171 families residing in the village. The population density was 713.41 inhabitants per square mile (275.45/km^{2}). There were 145 housing units at an average density of 294.72 per square mile (113.79/km^{2}). The racial makeup of the village was 95.73% White, 0.00% African American, 1.14% Native American, 0.00% Asian, 0.00% Pacific Islander, 0.00% from other races, and 3.13% from two or more races. Hispanic or Latino of any race were 2.28% of the population.

There were 228 households, out of which 42.1% had children under the age of 18 living with them, 58.33% were married couples living together, 15.79% had a female householder with no husband present, and 25.00% were non-families. 23.68% of all households were made up of individuals, and 9.21% had someone living alone who was 65 years of age or older. The average household size was 3.05 and the average family size was 2.57.

The village's age distribution consisted of 23.0% under the age of 18, 10.2% from 18 to 24, 26.3% from 25 to 44, 26.7% from 45 to 64, and 13.7% who were 65 years of age or older. The median age was 42.6 years. For every 100 females, there were 89.6 males. For every 100 females age 18 and over, there were 79.7 males.

The median income for a household in the village was $68,750, and the median income for a family was $81,875. Males had a median income of $50,417 versus $31,583 for females. The per capita income for the village was $28,422. About 0.6% of families and 2.4% of the population were below the poverty line, including 0.0% of those under age 18 and 7.5% of those age 65 or over.

== Popular culture ==
At a time when payphones could normally be found anywhere, the single payphone in town, near the corner outside the town's only gas station and a portion of the main street, was seen in the opening scenes of The Hunter, Steve McQueen's last movie. It was mentioned in the Kankakee County Journal at the time of filming in summer 1979.
