= Norton Township, Kankakee County, Illinois =

Norton Township
- Township
- Location in Kankakee County

- Kankakee County's location in Illinois
- Coordinates: 41°03′33″N 88°11′09″W
- Country: United States
- State: Illinois
- County: Kankakee
- Established: March 11, 1857

Government
  - Supervisor: Judy Zehr

Area
  - Total: 49.77 sq mi (128.9 km^{2})
  - Land: 49.77 sq mi (128.9 km^{2})
  - Water: 0 sq mi (0 km^{2}) 0%
- Elevation: 640 ft (195 m)

Population (2020)
  - Total: 936
  - Density: 18.8/sq mi (7.26/km^{2})
- Time zone: UTC-6 (CST)
  - Summer (DST): UTC-5 (CDT)
- ZIP codes: 60917, 60919, 60941, 60961, 60969
- FIPS code: 17-091-54352

Norton Township is one of seventeen townships in Kankakee County, Illinois, USA. As of the 2020 census, its population was 936 and it contained 394 housing units. Norton Township was organized in 1857 out of Essex Township.

== Geography ==
According to the 2021 census gazetteer files, Norton Township has a total area of 49.77 square miles (128.90 km^{2}), all land.

=== Cities, towns, villages ===
- Buckingham
- Cabery (north half)
- Reddick (southeast three-quarters)
- Union Hill

=== Adjacent townships ===
- Essex Township (north)
- Pilot Township (east)
- Milks Grove Township, Iroquois County (southeast)
- Rogers Township, Ford County (south)
- Broughton Township, Livingston County (southwest)
- Round Grove Township, Livingston County (west)
- Greenfield Township, Grundy County (northwest)

=== Cemeteries ===
The township contains these five cemeteries: Coleman, Edgerville, Floridgeville, Mount Hope and Smith.

=== Major highways ===
- Illinois Route 17
- Illinois Route 115

=== Airports and landing strips ===
- Hendrix Airport
- Hugh Van Voorst Airport

== Demographics ==
As of the 2020 census there were 936 people, 384 households, and 278 families residing in the township. The population density was 18.81 inhabitants per square mile (7.26/km^{2}). There were 394 housing units at an average density of 7.92 per square mile (3.06/km^{2}). The racial makeup of the township was 94.02% White, 0.53% African American, 0.21% Native American, 0.11% Asian, 0.00% Pacific Islander, 0.21% from other races, and 4.91% from two or more races. Hispanic or Latino of any race were 3.74% of the population.

There were 384 households, out of which 40.90% had children under the age of 18 living with them, 59.38% were married couples living together, 8.85% had a female householder with no spouse present, and 27.60% were non-families. 15.90% of all households were made up of individuals, and 6.30% had someone living alone who was 65 years of age or older. The average household size was 3.02 and the average family size was 3.62.

The township's age distribution consisted of 33.3% under the age of 18, 4.7% from 18 to 24, 25.4% from 25 to 44, 24% from 45 to 64, and 12.6% who were 65 years of age or older. The median age was 37.1 years. For every 100 females, there were 123.7 males. For every 100 females age 18 and over, there were 104.0 males.

The median income for a household in the township was $65,909, and the median income for a family was $80,119. Males had a median income of $56,250 versus $28,750 for females. The per capita income for the township was $23,461. About 3.6% of families and 7.9% of the population were below the poverty line, including 7.5% of those under age 18 and 2.1% of those age 65 or over.

Historical population
Census	Pop.	Note	%±
2000	1,008		—
2010	978		−3.0%
2020	936		−4.3%
U.S. Decennial Census

== Government ==
The township is governed by an elected Town Board of a Supervisor and four Trustees. The Township also has an elected Assessor, Clerk, Highway Commissioner and Supervisor. The Township Office is located at 16930 West 6000 South Road, Buckingham, IL 60917.

== Political districts ==
- Illinois's 11th congressional district
- State House District 75
- State Senate District 38

== School districts ==
- Herscher Community Unit School District 2
- Tri Point Community Unit School District 6-J
