= Buckingham, Illinois =

- Village
- Location of Buckingham in Illinois

- Location of Illinois in the United States
- Coordinates: 41°02′49″N 88°10′30″W
- Country: United States
- State: Illinois
- County: Kankakee
- Township: Norton

Area
  - Total: 0.25 sq mi (0.65 km^{2})
  - Land: 0.25 sq mi (0.65 km^{2})
  - Water: 0 sq mi (0.00 km^{2})
- Elevation: 653 ft (199 m)

Population (2020)
  - Total: 244
  - Density: 972.0/sq mi (375.31/km^{2})
- Time zone: UTC-6 (CST)
  - Summer (DST): UTC-5 (CDT)
- ZIP Code: 60917
- Area codes: 815 & 779
- FIPS code: 17-09304
- GNIS feature ID: 2397483
- Wikimedia Commons: Buckingham, Illinois

Buckingham is a village in Kankakee County, Illinois, United States. The population was 244 at the 2020 census. The village is about 63.7 miles south west of Chicago Illinois. It is included in the Kankakee-Bradley, Illinois Metropolitan Statistical Area.

The Coal Branch line of the Kankakee and Southwestern Railroad branched off in Buckingham and ran to the now lost, nearby towns of Clarke City and Tracy.

== Geography ==
Buckingham is located in southwestern Kankakee County. It is 20 miles (32 km) southwest of Kankakee, the county seat.

According to the 2021 census gazetteer files, Buckingham has a total area of 0.25 square miles (0.65 km^{2}), all land.

== Demographics ==
Historical population
Census	Pop.	Note	%±
1890	158		—
1910	272		—
1920	165		−39.3%
1930	140		−15.2%
1940	149		6.4%
1950	140		−6.0%
1960	152		8.6%
1970	198		30.3%
1980	330		66.7%
1990	340		3.0%
2000	237		−30.3%
2010	300		26.6%
2020	244		−18.7%
U.S. Decennial Census

As of the 2020 census there were 244 people, 90 households, and 69 families residing in the village. The population density was 972.11 inhabitants per square mile (375.33/km^{2}). There were 101 housing units at an average density of 402.39 per square mile (155.36/km^{2}). The racial makeup of the village was 91.39% White, 0.00% African American, 0.00% Native American, 0.00% Asian, 0.00% Pacific Islander, 0.82% from other races, and 7.79% from two or more races. Hispanic or Latino of any race were 4.92% of the population.

There were 90 households, out of which 31.1% had children under the age of 18 living with them, 46.67% were married couples living together, 24.44% had a female householder with no husband present, and 23.33% were non-families. 21.11% of all households were made up of individuals, and 5.56% had someone living alone who was 65 years of age or older. The average household size was 3.52 and the average family size was 3.00.

The village's age distribution consisted of 23.7% under the age of 18, 5.2% from 18 to 24, 23.7% from 25 to 44, 30.7% from 45 to 64, and 16.7% who were 65 years of age or older. The median age was 41.7 years. For every 100 females, there were 94.2 males. For every 100 females age 18 and over, there were 82.3 males.

The median income for a household in the village was $63,750, and the median income for a family was $72,750. Males had a median income of $41,071 versus $39,583 for females. The per capita income for the village was $23,256. About 5.8% of families and 11.9% of the population were below the poverty line, including 21.9% of those under age 18 and 6.7% of those age 65 or over.
