= Ashkum, Illinois =

- Village
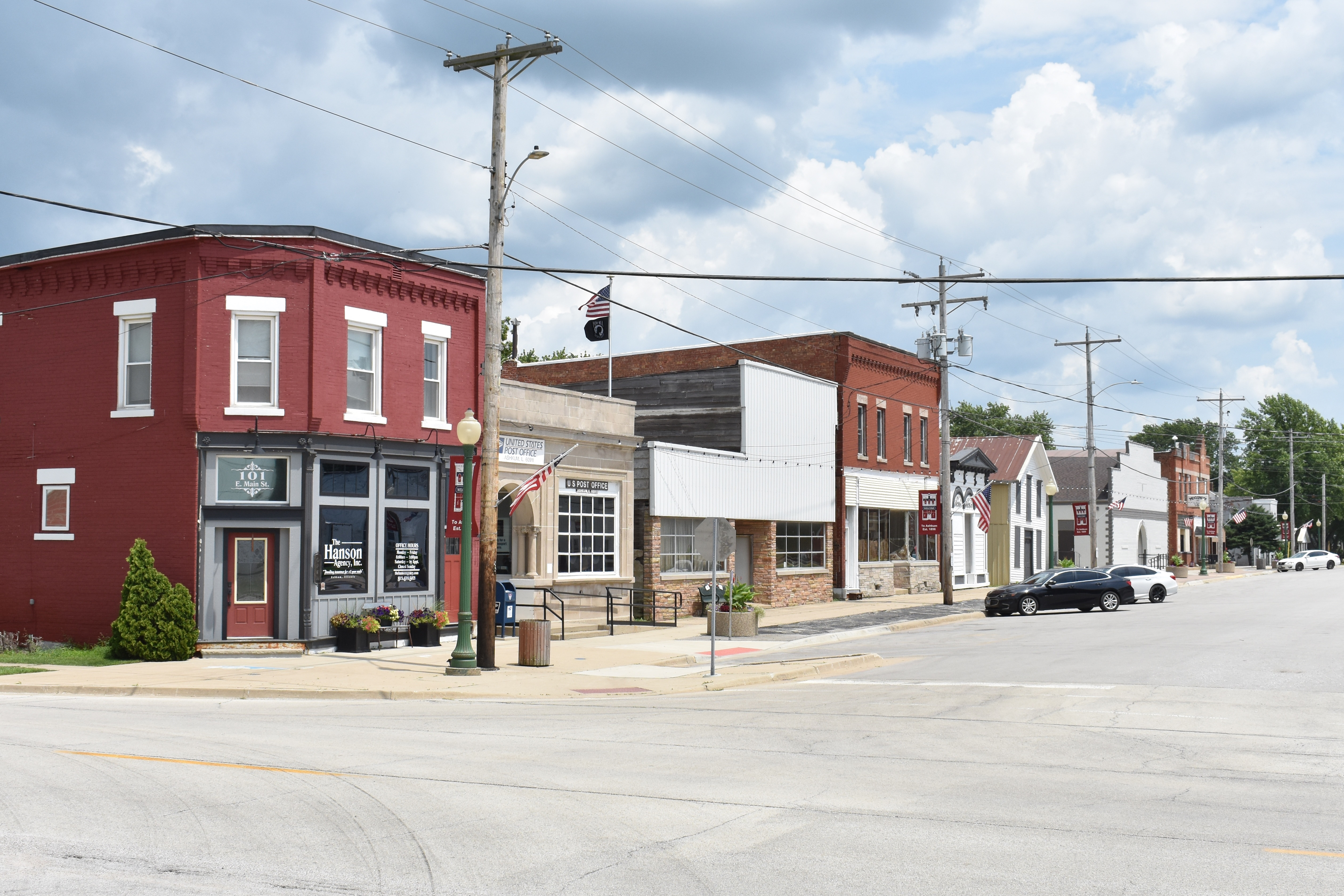
- Ashkum in July 2026

- Location of Ashkum in Iroquois County, Illinois

- Ashkum's location in Iroquois County
- Coordinates: 40°52′49″N 87°57′18″W
- Country: United States
- State: Illinois
- County: Iroquois
- Township: Ashkum

Area
  - Total: 0.83 sq mi (2.16 km^{2})
  - Land: 0.83 sq mi (2.16 km^{2})
  - Water: 0 sq mi (0.00 km^{2})
- Elevation: 659 ft (201 m)

Population (2020)
  - Total: 750
  - Density: 897.7/sq mi (346.61/km^{2})
- ZIP code: 60911
- Area codes: 815, 779
- FIPS code: 17-02479
- GNIS feature ID: 2397995
- Website: www.ashkum.net

Ashkum is a village in Ashkum Township, Iroquois County, Illinois, United States. The population was 750 at the 2020 census.

== Origin of name ==
Ashkum is said to be named after an Iroquois chief, whose name means "more and more."

== Geography ==
U.S. Route 45 passes through the village, leading east then north 21 miles (34 km) to Kankakee, and south 9 miles (14 km) to Gilman. Illinois Route 116 leads west from Ashkum 37 miles (60 km) to Pontiac. Interstate 57 crosses IL-116 at Exit 293 just west of Ashkum; it leads north 18 miles (29 km) to Kankakee and 78 miles (126 km) to Chicago, while to the south it leads 57 miles (92 km) to Champaign.

According to the 2021 census gazetteer files, Ashkum has a total area of 0.84 square miles (2.18 km^{2}), all land.

Immediate neighbors of Ashkum are Danforth (4 miles (6 km) south), Cullom (16 miles (26 km) west), and Clifton (4 miles north).

== Demographics ==
Historical population
Census	Pop.	Note	%±
1880	245		—
1890	300		22.4%
1900	429		43.0%
1910	416		−3.0%
1920	375		−9.9%
1930	319		−14.9%
1940	337		5.6%
1950	420		24.6%
1960	601		43.1%
1970	590		−1.8%
1980	735		24.6%
1990	650		−11.6%
2000	724		11.4%
2010	761		5.1%
2020	750		−1.4%
U.S. Decennial Census

As of the 2020 census there were 750 people, 330 households, and 224 families residing in the village. The population density was 898.20 inhabitants per square mile (346.80/km^{2}). There were 320 housing units at an average density of 383.23 per square mile (147.97/km^{2}). The racial makeup of the village was 93.47% White, 0.80% African American, 0.13% Native American, 0.27% Asian, 0.00% Pacific Islander, 0.93% from other races, and 4.40% from two or more races. Hispanic or Latino of any race were 2.93% of the population.

There were 330 households, out of which 33.9% had children under the age of 18 living with them, 48.48% were married couples living together, 9.70% had a female householder with no husband present, and 32.12% were non-families. 26.36% of all households were made up of individuals, and 10.00% had someone living alone who was 65 years of age or older. The average household size was 2.94 and the average family size was 2.44.

The village's age distribution consisted of 25.4% under the age of 18, 7.7% from 18 to 24, 25% from 25 to 44, 26.6% from 45 to 64, and 15.3% who were 65 years of age or older. The median age was 37.6 years. For every 100 females, there were 94.7 males. For every 100 females age 18 and over, there were 107.2 males.

The median income for a household in the village was $55,625, and the median income for a family was $72,059. Males had a median income of $42,763 versus $26,932 for females. The per capita income for the village was $27,572. About 3.6% of families and 8.0% of the population were below the poverty line, including 2.5% of those under age 18 and 15.4% of those age 65 or over.

== Communications ==
Ashkum is one of three municipalities in Iroquois County (along with Chebanse and Clifton) that are served by Comcast's South Suburban Chicago system (which is based out of Homewood and also serves the Kankakee area). This means that for local broadcast channels, Ashkum receives stations from the Chicago area and does not receive any stations from the Champaign–Springfield–Decatur market, which includes Iroquois County.
