= Scott Meents =

American basketball player (born 1964)

Personal information
- Born: January 4, 1964 (age 62) Kankakee, Illinois
- Listed height: 6 ft 10 in (2.08 m)
- Listed weight: 225 lb (102 kg)

Career information
- High school: Herscher (Herscher, Illinois)
- College: Illinois (1982–1986)
- NBA draft: 1986: 4th round, 74th overall pick
- Drafted by: Chicago Bulls
- Playing career: 1986–1998
- Position: Power forward
- Number: 50, 8

Career history
- 1986–1987: Citrosil Verona
- 1987: Pensacola Tornados
- 1987–1988: Segafredo Gorizia
- 1989–1991: Seattle SuperSonics
- 1991: Rockford Lightning
- 1991–1992: Bakersfield Jammers
- 1992–1994: Yakima Sun Kings
- 1994: Rochester Renegade
- 1995–1996: Chicago Rockers
- 1996–1997: Cocodrilos de Caracas
- 1997–1998: Gießen 46ers

Career highlights
- All-CBA Second Team (1993)
- Stats at NBA.com
- Stats at Basketball Reference

Scott Eric Meents (born January 4, 1964) is an American former professional basketball player who played in the National Basketball Association (NBA) and the Continental Basketball Association (CBA).

Meents, a 6'10" 225 power forward born in Kankakee, Illinois, played four years at the University of Illinois and was selected by the Chicago Bulls with the fourth pick in the 4th round of the 1986 NBA draft and averaged 1.8 points and 1.0 rebound per game with the Seattle SuperSonics from 1989 to 1991. Later during the 1991 offseason he signed with the Utah Jazz but was waived just days later.

Meents also played in the Continental Basketball Association (CBA) for the Pensacola Tornados, Bakersfield Jammers, Rockford Lightning, Yakima Sun Kings, Rochester Renegade and Chicago Rockers from 1987 to 1996. He was selected to the All-CBA Second Team in 1993.
