= Essex Township =

Essex Township may refer to the following places in the United States:

- Essex Township, Kankakee County, Illinois
- Essex Township, Stark County, Illinois
- Essex Township, Michigan
