= Ashkum Township, Iroquois County, Illinois =

Ashkum Township
- Township
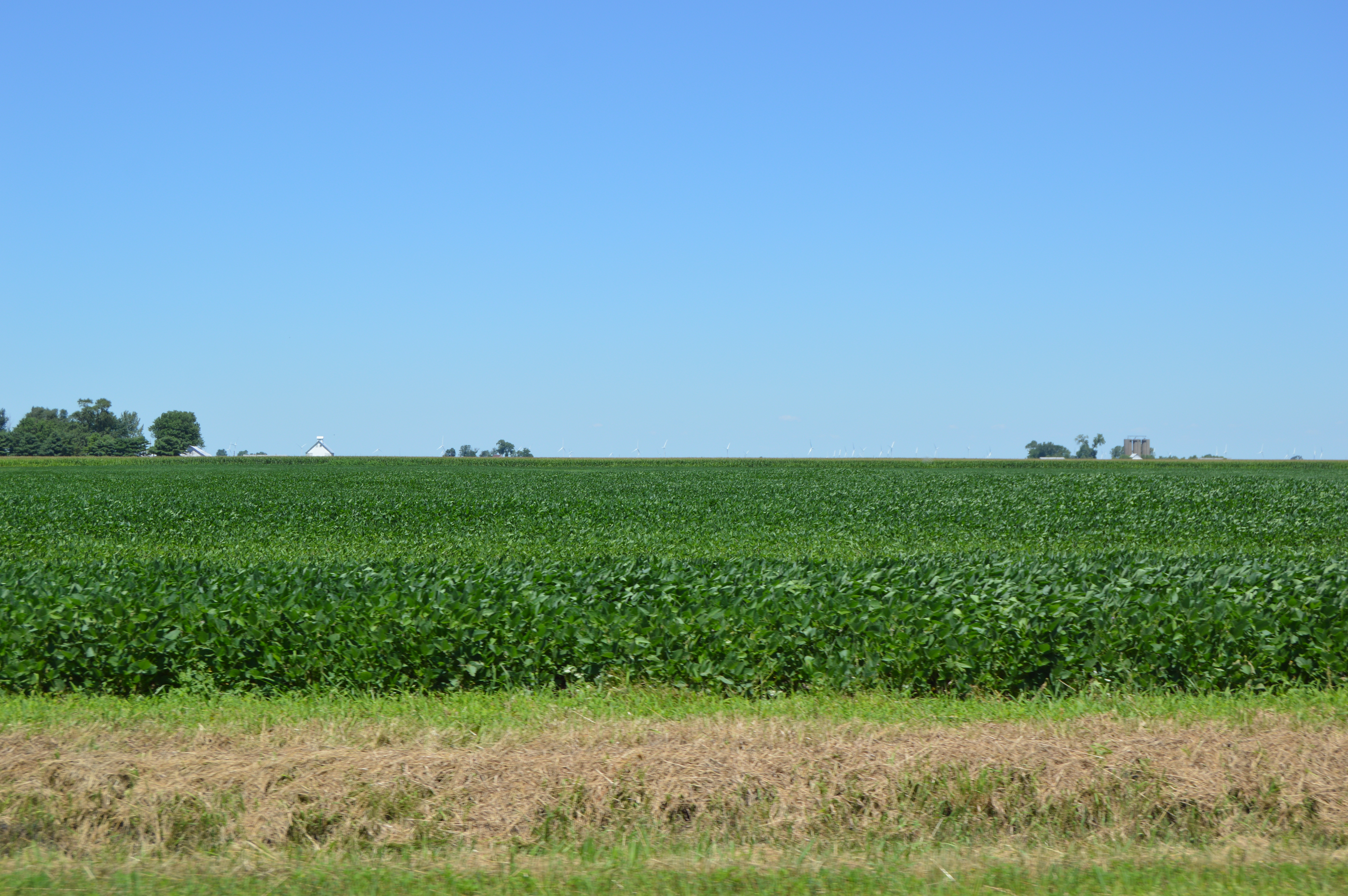
- Fields west of Ashkum

- Location in Iroquois County

- Iroquois County's location in Illinois
- Coordinates: 40°52′50″N 87°58′33″W
- Country: United States
- State: Illinois
- County: Iroquois
- Established: March 1857

Area
  - Total: 62.47 sq mi (161.8 km^{2})
  - Land: 62.37 sq mi (161.5 km^{2})
  - Water: 0.1 sq mi (0.26 km^{2}) 0.16%
- Elevation: 673 ft (205 m)

Population (2020)
  - Total: 1,420
  - Density: 22.8/sq mi (8.79/km^{2})
- Time zone: UTC-6 (CST)
  - Summer (DST): UTC-5 (CDT)
- ZIP codes: 60911, 60927, 60930
- FIPS code: 17-075-02492

Ashkum Township is one of twenty-six townships in Iroquois County, Illinois, USA. As of the 2020 census, its population was 1,420 and it contained 620 housing units. Ashkum Township formed from portions of Chebanse Township and Onarga Township in March, 1857.

== Geography ==
According to the 2021 census gazetteer files, Ashkum Township has a total area of 62.47 square miles (161.80 km^{2}), of which 62.37 square miles (161.54 km^{2}) (or 99.84%) is land and 0.10 square miles (0.26 km^{2}) (or 0.16%) is water.

=== Cities, towns, villages ===
- Ashkum

=== Unincorporated towns ===
- L'Erable at 40.9033669°N 87.8469821°W

=== Cemeteries ===
The township contains the Ashkum Cemetery and the L'Erable Catholic Cemetery.

=== Major highways ===
- Interstate 57
- U.S. Route 45
- U.S. Route 52
- Illinois Route 49
- Illinois Route 116

== Demographics ==
As of the 2020 census there were 1,420 people, 585 households, and 390 families residing in the township. The population density was 22.73 inhabitants per square mile (8.78/km^{2}). There were 620 housing units at an average density of 9.93 per square mile (3.83/km^{2}). The racial makeup of the township was 93.94% White, 0.63% African American, 0.07% Native American, 0.28% Asian, 0.00% Pacific Islander, 0.92% from other races, and 4.15% from two or more races. Hispanic or Latino of any race were 1.97% of the population.

There were 585 households, out of which 29.10% had children under the age of 18 living with them, 53.68% were married couples living together, 5.47% had a female householder with no spouse present, and 33.33% were non-families. 26.80% of all households were made up of individuals, and 14.20% had someone living alone who was 65 years of age or older. The average household size was 2.31 and the average family size was 2.73.

The township's age distribution consisted of 21.0% under the age of 18, 6.8% from 18 to 24, 24.7% from 25 to 44, 28.1% from 45 to 64, and 19.4% who were 65 years of age or older. The median age was 44.3 years. For every 100 females, there were 103.6 males. For every 100 females age 18 and over, there were 116.0 males.

The median income for a household in the township was $58,558, and the median income for a family was $79,500. Males had a median income of $45,682 versus $32,250 for females. The per capita income for the township was $31,506. About 2.1% of families and 6.3% of the population were below the poverty line, including 2.0% of those under age 18 and 10.3% of those age 65 or over.

Historical population
Census	Pop.	Note	%±
2000	1,507		—
2010	1,542		2.3%
2020	1,420		−7.9%
U.S. Decennial Census

== School districts ==
- Central Community Unit School District 4
- Iroquois West Community Unit School District 10
- Tri Point Community Unit School District 6-J

== Political districts ==
- Illinois' 2nd congressional district
- State House District 75
- State House District 105
- State Senate District 38
- State Senate District 53
- Iroquois County Board District 1
