= Clifton, Illinois =

- Village
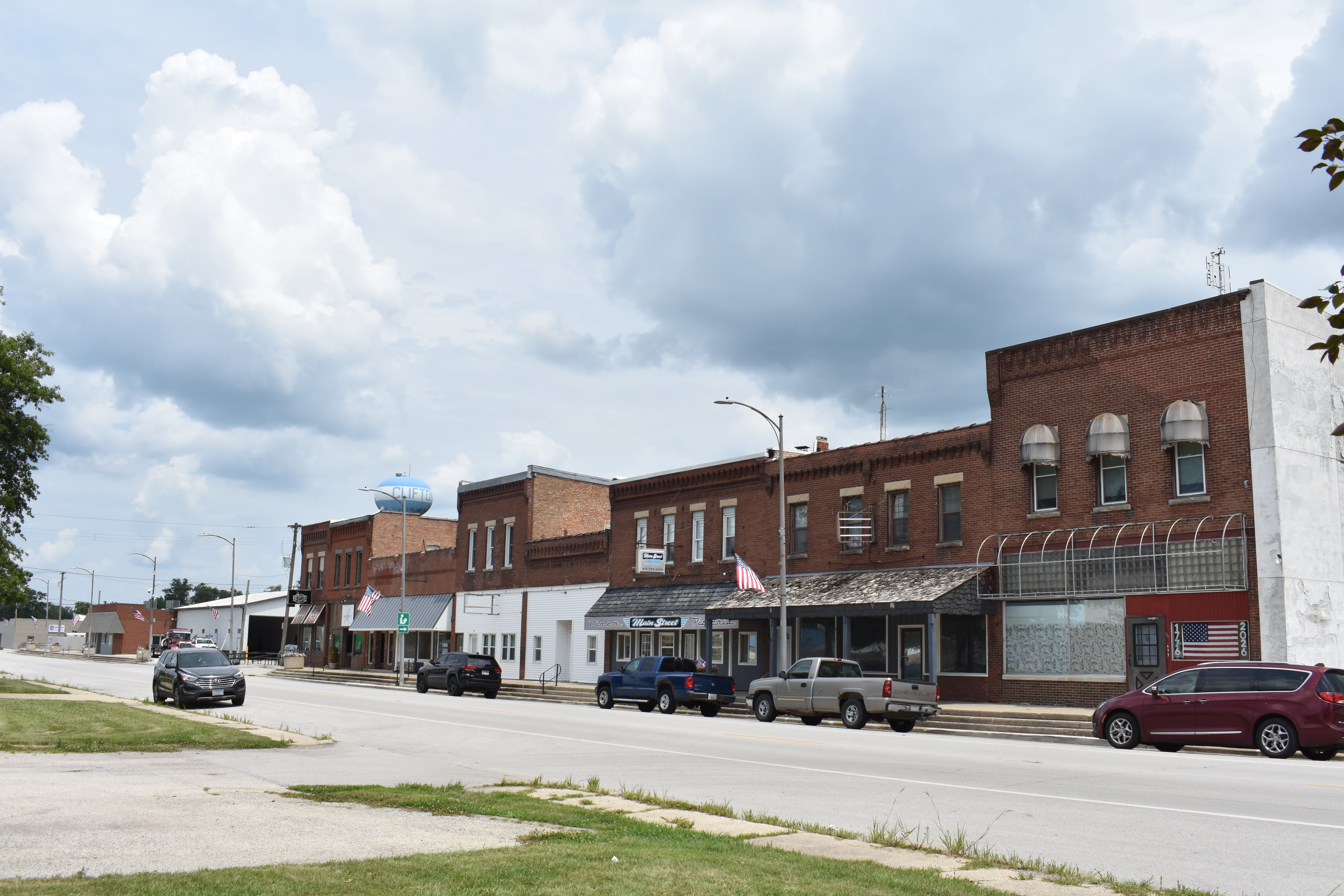
- Downtown Clifton

- Location of Clifton in Iroquois County, Illinois

- Clifton's location in Iroquois County
- Coordinates: 40°56′05″N 87°56′04″W
- Country: United States
- State: Illinois
- County: Iroquois
- Township: Chebanse

Government
  - Mayor: Jeffrey Hall

Area
  - Total: 0.93 sq mi (2.41 km^{2})
  - Land: 0.93 sq mi (2.41 km^{2})
  - Water: 0 sq mi (0.00 km^{2})
- Elevation: 669 ft (204 m)

Population (2020)
  - Total: 1,500
  - Density: 1,454.1/sq mi (561.43/km^{2})
- Time zone: UTC-6 (CST)
  - Summer (DST): UTC-5 (CDT)
- ZIP code: 60927
- Area code: 815
- FIPS code: 17-14936
- GNIS feature ID: 2397649
- Website: www.cliftonillinois.com

Clifton is a village in Chebanse Township, Iroquois County, Illinois, United States. The population was 1,352 at the 2020 census.

== History ==
Clifton was founded in 1857. The village takes its name from the Clifton Hotel in Chicago.

== Geography ==
Clifton is located in northern Iroquois County. Interstate 57 passes along the eastern side of the village, with access from Exit 297. I-57 leads north 14 miles (23 km) to Kankakee and south 61 miles (98 km) to Champaign. Chicago is 72 miles (116 km) north of Clifton.

According to the 2021 census gazetteer files, Clifton has a total area of 0.93 square miles (2.41 km^{2}), all land.

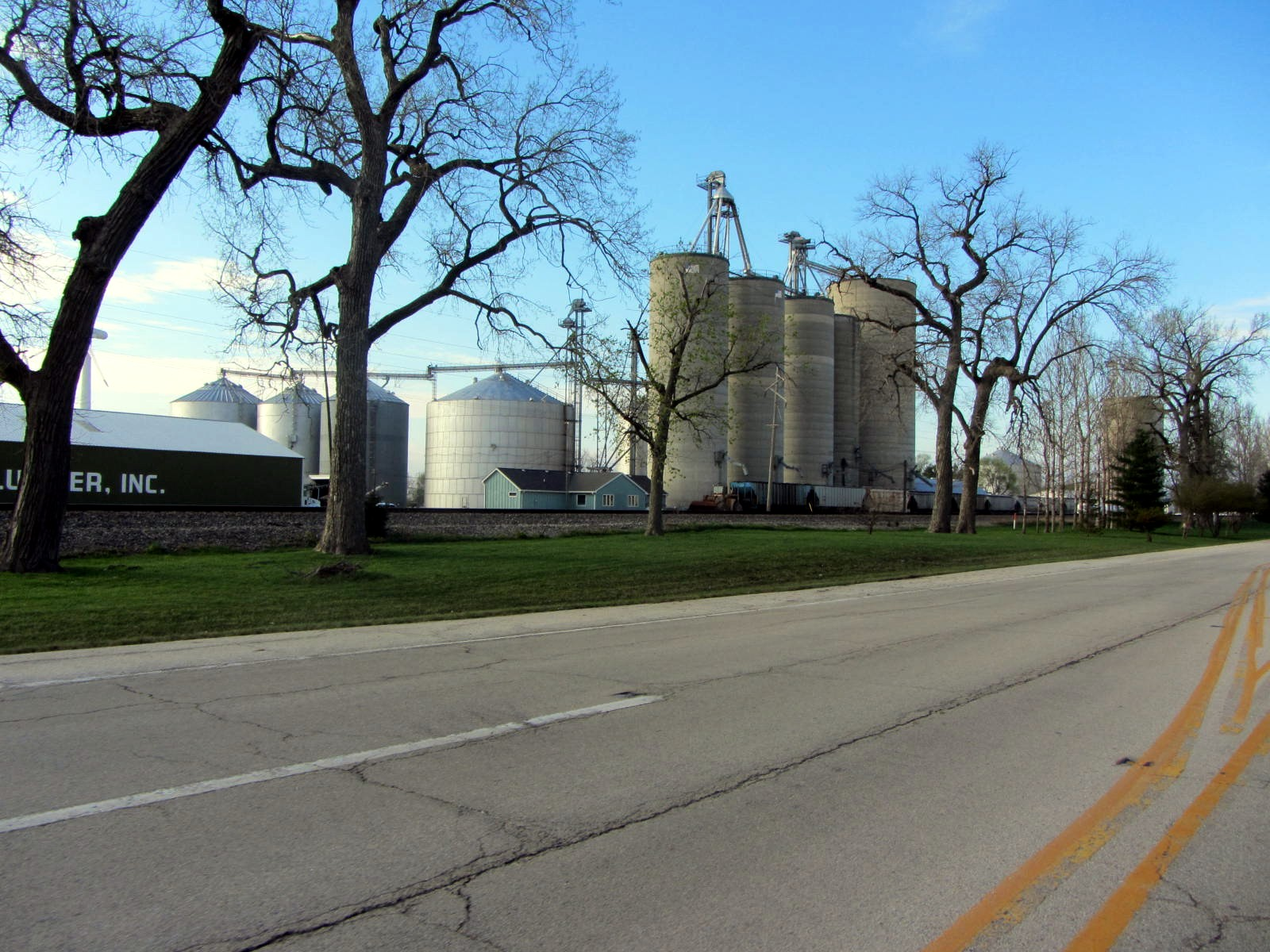
Grain silos in Clifton

== Demographics ==
Historical population
Census	Pop.	Note	%±
1880	474		—
1890	474		0.0%
1900	652		37.6%
1910	634		−2.8%
1920	638		0.6%
1930	589		−7.7%
1940	580		−1.5%
1950	734		26.6%
1960	1,018		38.7%
1970	1,339		31.5%
1980	1,390		3.8%
1990	1,347		−3.1%
2000	1,317		−2.2%
2010	1,468		11.5%
2020	1,352		−7.9%
U.S. Decennial Census

=== 2020 census ===
As of the 2020 census, Clifton had a population of 1,352, with 540 households and 336 families residing in the village. The population density was 1,453.76 inhabitants per square mile (561.30/km^{2}). There were 560 housing units at an average density of 602.15 per square mile (232.49/km^{2}). The median age was 38.9 years. 24.8% of residents were under the age of 18 and 17.0% of residents were 65 years of age or older. For every 100 females there were 99.1 males, and for every 100 females age 18 and over there were 98.6 males age 18 and over.

0.0% of residents lived in urban areas, while 100.0% lived in rural areas.

Of all households, 33.9% had children under the age of 18 living in them. 51.9% were married-couple households, 16.5% were households with a male householder and no spouse or partner present, and 24.6% were households with a female householder and no spouse or partner present. About 27.4% of all households were made up of individuals and 12.6% had someone living alone who was 65 years of age or older.

Of the housing units, 3.6% were vacant. The homeowner vacancy rate was 0.7% and the rental vacancy rate was 3.4%.

Racial composition as of the 2020 census
Race	Number	Percent
White	1,269	93.9%
Black or African American	7	0.5%
American Indian and Alaska Native	2	0.1%
Asian	2	0.1%
Native Hawaiian and Other Pacific Islander	0	0.0%
Some other race	7	0.5%
Two or more races	65	4.8%
Hispanic or Latino (of any race)	51	3.8%

=== Income and poverty ===
The median income for a household in the village was $72,188, and the median income for a family was $83,571. Males had a median income of $49,236 versus $30,144 for females. The per capita income for the village was $31,837. About 8.6% of families and 8.5% of the population were below the poverty line, including 13.4% of those under age 18 and 3.1% of those age 65 or over.

== Communications ==
Clifton is one of three municipalities in Iroquois County (along with Ashkum and Chebanse) that are served by Comcast's South Suburban Chicago system (which is based out of Homewood and also serves the Kankakee area). This means that for local broadcast channels, Clifton receives stations from the Chicago area and does not receive any stations from the Champaign–Springfield–Decatur market, which includes Iroquois County.
