= Goodrich, Illinois =

- Unincorporated community
- Location within Illinois Location within the United States
- Coordinates: 41°06′32″N 88°03′29″W
- Country: United States
- State: Illinois
- County: Kankakee
- Elevation: 636 ft (194 m)
- Time zone: UTC-6 (Central (CST))
  - Summer (DST): UTC-5 (CDT)
- Area codes: 815 & 779
- GNIS feature ID: 409153

Goodrich is an unincorporated community in Pilot Township, Kankakee County, Illinois, United States. The community is on Goodrich Road and a railway line 2.6 miles (4.2 km) south of Bonfield.
