= Essex, Illinois =

- Village
- Location of Essex in Illinois

- Location of Illinois in the United States
- Coordinates: 41°10′55″N 88°11′34″W
- Country: United States
- State: Illinois
- County: Kankakee
- Township: Essex

Area
  - Total: 2.35 sq mi (6.09 km^{2})
  - Land: 2.33 sq mi (6.03 km^{2})
  - Water: 0.027 sq mi (0.07 km^{2})
- Elevation: 591 ft (180 m)

Population (2020)
  - Total: 841
  - Density: 361.4/sq mi (139.54/km^{2})
- Time zone: UTC-6 (CST)
  - Summer (DST): UTC-5 (CDT)
- ZIP code: 60935
- Area codes: 815 & 779
- FIPS code: 17-24452
- GNIS ID: 2398841
- Website: www.villageofessex.org

Essex is a village in Kankakee County, Illinois, United States. The population was 841 at the 2020 census, up from 802 at the 2010 census. It is included in the Kankakee-Bradley, Illinois Metropolitan Statistical Area.

== History ==
Ira M. Lish (1855–1937), Illinois politician and lawyer, was born in Essex.

Unlike earlier underground coal mines exploited by coal miners living in the now lost, nearby settlements of Tracy, Oklahoma and Clarke City, open-pit mines were established near Essex.

== Geography ==
Essex is located in western Kankakee County 19 miles (31 km) northwest of Kankakee, the county seat, and 7 miles (11 km) south of Braidwood.

According to the 2021 census gazetteer files, Essex has a total area of 2.35 square miles (6.09 km^{2}), of which 2.33 square miles (6.03 km^{2}) (or 98.94%) is land and 0.03 square miles (0.08 km^{2}) (or 1.06%) is water.

== Demographics ==
Historical population
Census	Pop.	Note	%±
1890	266		—
1900	385		44.7%
1910	342		−11.2%
1920	278		−18.7%
1930	207		−25.5%
1940	211		1.9%
1950	284		34.6%
1960	328		15.5%
1970	364		11.0%
1980	463		27.2%
1990	482		4.1%
2000	554		14.9%
2010	802		44.8%
2020	841		4.9%
U.S. Decennial Census

As of the 2020 census there were 841 people, 355 households, and 277 families residing in the village. The population density was 357.57 inhabitants per square mile (138.06/km^{2}). There were 314 housing units at an average density of 133.50 per square mile (51.54/km^{2}). The racial makeup of the village was 93.58% White, 0.12% African American, 0.24% Native American, 0.24% Asian, 0.00% Pacific Islander, 1.31% from other races, and 4.52% from two or more races. Hispanic or Latino of any race were 3.80% of the population.

There were 355 households, out of which 40.3% had children under the age of 18 living with them, 66.76% were married couples living together, 4.79% had a female householder with no husband present, and 21.97% were non-families. 20.28% of all households were made up of individuals, and 5.35% had someone living alone who was 65 years of age or older. The average household size was 3.47 and the average family size was 3.05.

The village's age distribution consisted of 31.4% under the age of 18, 6.4% from 18 to 24, 27.7% from 25 to 44, 21.9% from 45 to 64, and 12.6% who were 65 years of age or older. The median age was 32.7 years. For every 100 females, there were 93.0 males. For every 100 females age 18 and over, there were 102.5 males.

The median income for a household in the village was $81,458, and the median income for a family was $101,125. Males had a median income of $78,500 versus $32,059 for females. The per capita income for the village was $35,914. About 4.0% of families and 4.7% of the population were below the poverty line, including 7.9% of those under age 18 and 12.5% of those age 65 or over.
