= Ira M. Lish =

American politician

Ira M. Lish (June 16, 1855 – June 15, 1937) was an American politician and businessman.

Lish was born in Essex, Kankakee County, Illinois. He went to the public schools. He was involved with the banking and mercantile business in Saunemin, Illinois. Lish served on the Livingston County Board of Supervisors and on the Saunemin Village Board. He was a Republican. Lish served in the Illinois House of Representatives from 1907 to 1908 and in the Illinois Senate from 1909 to 1912. Lish died at his home in Saunemin, Illinois, from a long illness.
