= Kroehler Manufacturing Company =

Furniture Company

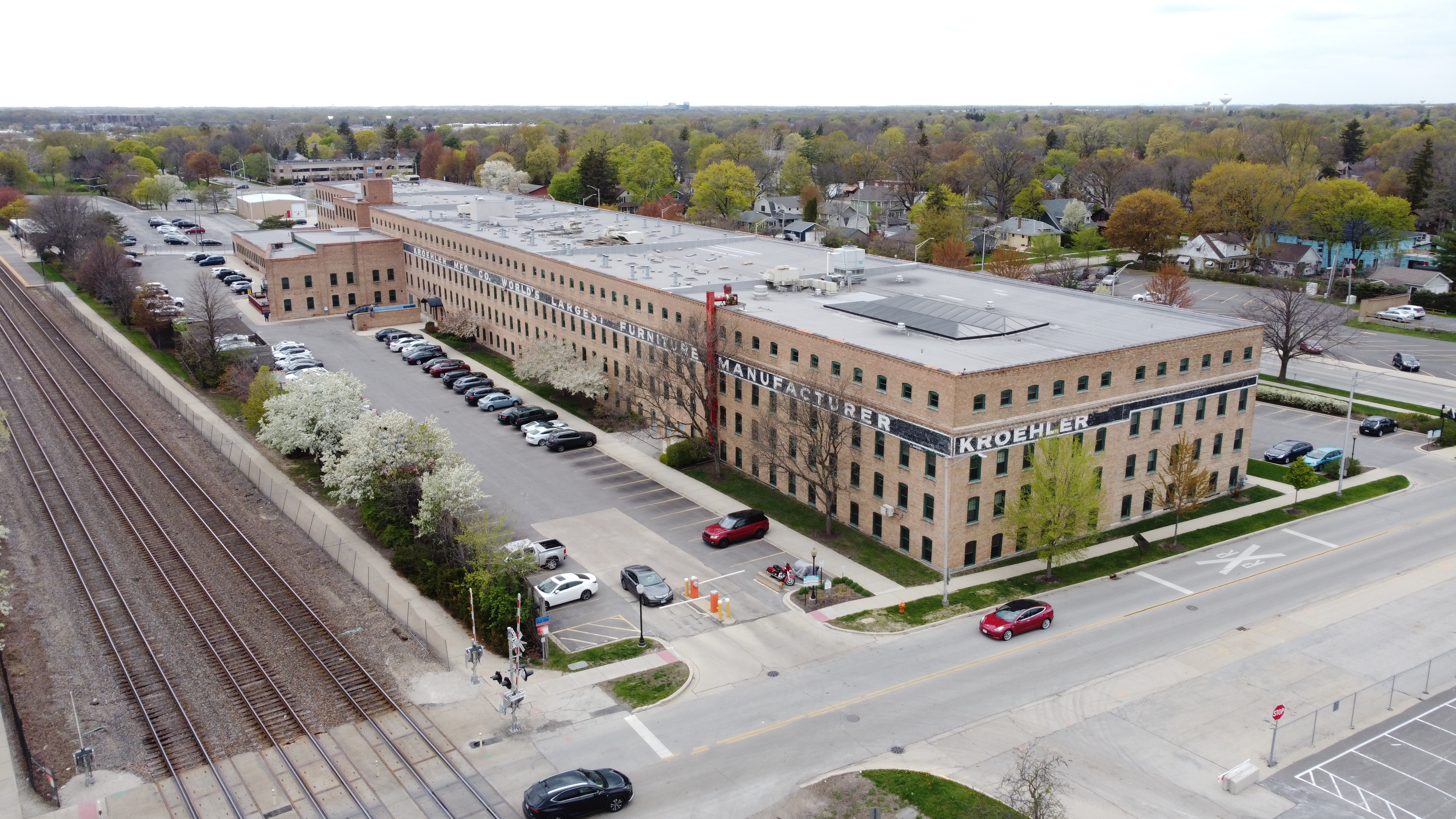
- The Former Kroehler Factory in Naperville IL, seen in 2021.
- Formerly: Naperville Lounge Company
- Company type: Private
- Founded: March 9, 1893
- Defunct: 1981
- Headquarters: 200 E 5th Ave, Naperville, IL 60563

Kroehler /ˈkreɪlə/ Manufacturing Company was a furniture company and was originally incorporated as the Naperville Lounge Company, on March 9, 1893. It was founded by ten original stockholders. In 1896, Peter Kroehler, an employee, offered to purchase the stockholder's interest at its book value. The offer was taken, and at the beginning of 1896 a new group of four partners took over the business. In 1897, the company found a new headquarters next to the C. B. & Q tracks in Naperville IL. On April 6, 1903, Peter Kroehler was made president of the company. On April 1, 1915, the name "Kroehler Manufacturing Company" was adopted, as the company had four factories now operating under various names, which was inconvenient. Kroehler Manufacturing Company later became the world's largest furniture company. During the 1970s, the company started operating at a loss, closing its historic Naperville factory in 1978 and ending its operations in the area. In 1981 Kroehler Manufacturing Company was acquired by the ATR Group of Northbrook, which sold off the furniture plants and the Kroehler name.

== History ==
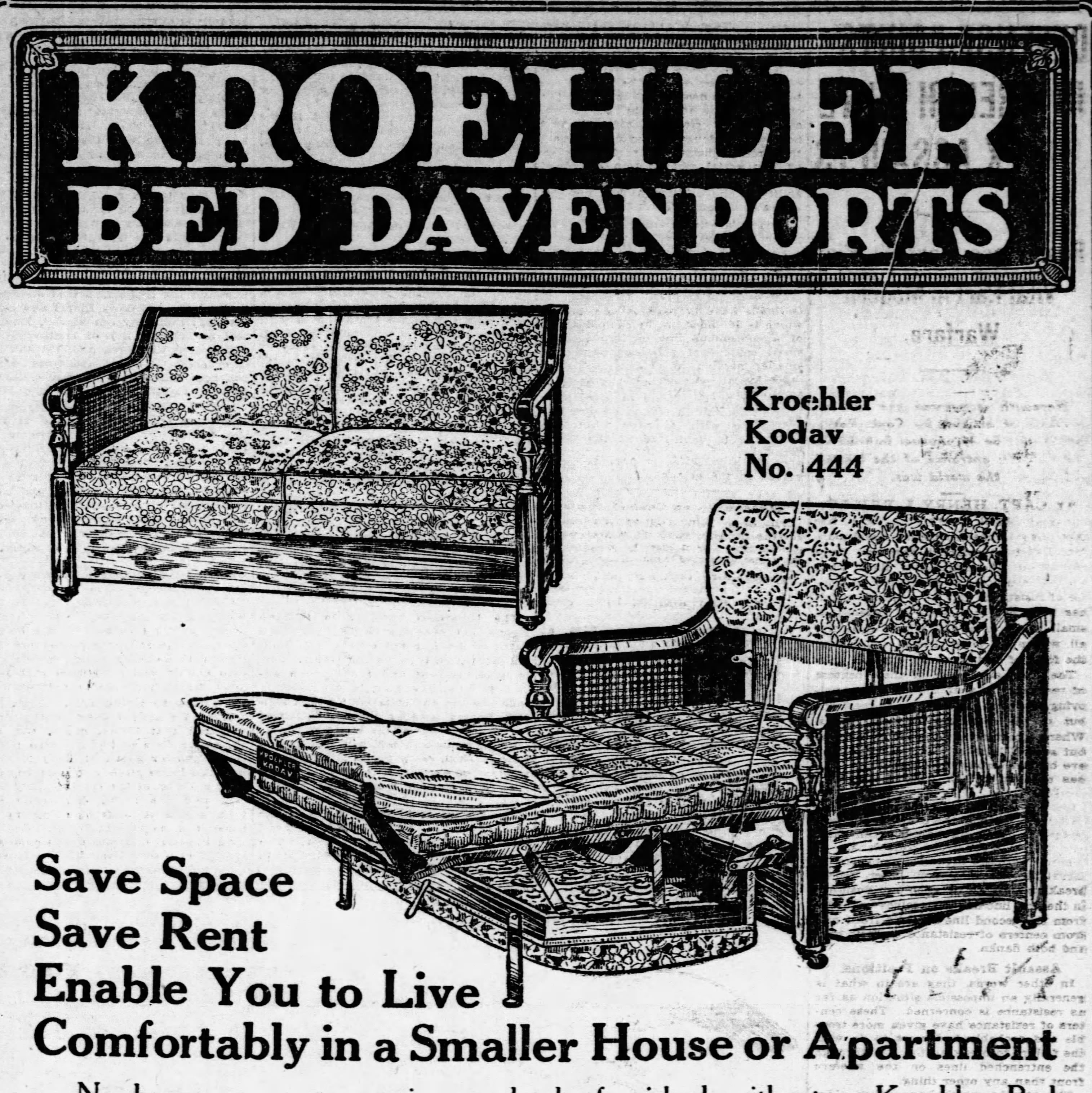
An ad for the Kroehler Davenport Bed

=== Beginning ===
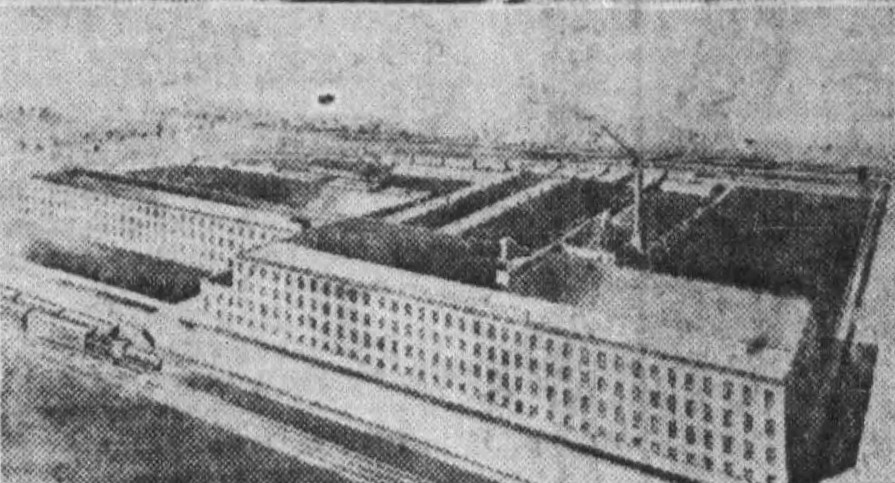
The Kroehler factory in Kankakee, IL, in 1921.

Kroehler Manufacturing Company began as a simple venture among 10 shareholders. Two of the men, Fred Long and John Kraushar, had been making furniture as a small business, but they wanted to expand. They then founded a group of 10 shareholders, and started "Naperville Lounge Company", with a starting capitol of $6,000, on March 9, 1893. The company was first headquartered in an old abandoned one-story skating rink. Peter E. Kroehler joined the company on April 3, 1893, after one of his old professors at North Central College asked him to work there, as the professor was a shareholder. Their second year of operations ended with a loss of $1100. Peter Kroehler borrowed $500 from his father, and used it to buy out other shareholders. When in the summer of 1895, a principal shareholder died, which made other investors start to lose faith in the company, Peter Kroehler bought them out at book value. 1895 ended with a profit of $600. In the summer of 1896, a new group of 4 investors, including Peter Kroehler, took over the company. In 1896, the company profited $1126.90. In July 1897 the company realized the need for a larger factory space, and they found it along the C. B. & Q tracks in Naperville, IL. A two-story-and-basement frame structure was erected, 30 x 100 feet in size. By the year 1900, the company reached $7,200 in profit; a year later, it reached $15,000. On April 6, 1903, Peter Kroehler was made president of the company with a $5,000 salary. In 1903, Sears Roebuck & Company bought out 50% of the company, with Peter Kroehler owning the other half. The day-to-day operations of the company would be run by Kroehler. Peter Kroehler's brother Benjamin Kroehler moved to Binghamton, NY, and oversaw the building and opening of the Binghamton Lounge Co., which was also involved in furniture manufacture. That plant opened on April 10, 1907, with 12 employees. Despite the different names, the Binghamton plant was operated as the eastern branch of the Illinois firm. In 1909, Kroehler invented, and obtained a patent on, a form of the Davenport Bed. These became immediately popular. Kroehler foresaw a large market for the bed, so much so that he decided to get a controlling interest, by outright purchase of companies, if necessary, in as many patents as possible. In 1911, a new plant was erected in Kankakee, Illinois, and started operations as the P. E. Kroehler Mfg. Co. In 1913, The D. T Owen Company, from Cleveland, Ohio, another davenport bed manufacturer, was purchased. That same year, the Naperville plant was partly destroyed by the "Easter Cyclone", so a new building was erected in its place. Having 4 factories under different names was undesirable, however, so on April 1, 1915, the name "Kroehler Manufacturing Company" was adopted, being named after its president. That same year, in 1915, Kroehler bought back Sears' shares in the company, for a price of 1.2 Million dollars.

=== Height of the company ===
On July 1, 1927, the Valentine-Seaver Company was purchased at a cost of $3,500,000. The company specialized in high-grade upholstered furniture and was located on the northwest side of Chicago. Luce Furniture Shops, of Grand Rapids, was purchased in 1930. With the purchase came the development of dining room and bedroom furniture in the Kroehler Catalog. During the Great Depression, the Kroehler Company was not without its financial troubles. As a response, Peter advertised the quality construction of his furniture to appeal to cost-conscious buyers, and offered incentives to stores to inspire creative window displays and increase sales. In 1938, Peter stepped down from the position of president, and was elected chairman of the Board of the Kroehler Manufacturing Company and his son, Delmar Leroy Kroehler, became president. In the middle of the 1940s, Kroehler was the second-largest furniture maker in the United States with over $20 million in annual sales. During WWII, the Kroehler Company suffered issues in getting raw materials due to rationing. As a result, they pursued contracts from the government for war work, making things like filing cabinets and duffel bags. From August 1946 to January 1947, the company suffered from its largest worker strike, with over 2500 employees protesting for higher wages. The strike cost the company over 1 million dollars. On April 25, 1946, a nearby train accident in Naperville occurred in response to which over 800 Kroehler employees helped rescue survivors and assist in the wreckage. The west end of the factory was turned into a makeshift triage area. Some of the beds that the company made were used as temporary hospital beds. In the mid-1950s, the company was delivering over 128 truckloads of furniture a day. In the 1960s, the company employed close to 8,000 people around the country, and their annual revenues passed $100 million.

=== Decline and present day ===
Smaller profit margins during the 1960s and early 1970s undermined the company's performance. The company closed the Naperville plant in 1978, as they were operating at a loss. Due to millions dollars in losses, Kroehler Manufacturing Company was sold to the ATR group in Northbrook in 1981. The plant in Bradley was and sold in 1982.

Due to the company name being sold off, nowadays there are 2 different Kroehler Furniture Companies, one in North Carolina and the other in Ontario, Canada. In the 1980s, the Naperville location was made into a converted condo building.

Conover, North Carolina-based Kroehler Furniture Co.'s manufacturing plant shut down abruptly on December 31, 2025, after giving its 275 employees only two days notice.
