= Northfield Square =

Shopping mall in Bradley, Illinois

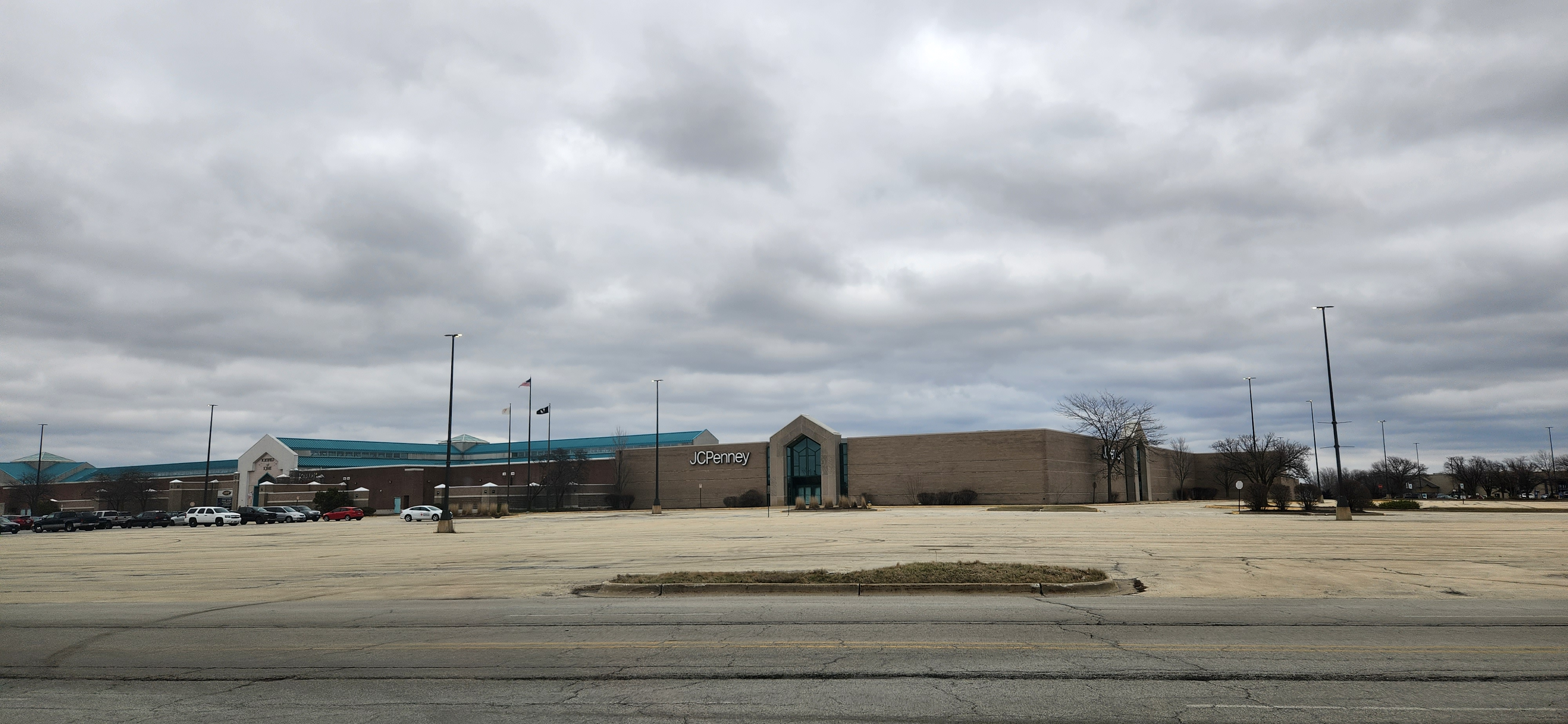
- The mall's entrance and JCPenney.
- Location: 1600 N State Route 50 Bourbonnais, IL 60419
- Coordinates: 41.1745°N 87.8474°W
- Opened: August 1, 1990
- Developer: Edward J. DeBartolo
- Manager: Village of Bradley
- Owner: Village of Bradley
- Num. of stores: 37
- Num. of anchor tenants: 5 (1 open, 4 vacant)
- Floor area: 530,325 sq ft (49,268.8 m^{2})
- Floors: 1
- Public transit: River Valley Metro Mass Transit District

Northfield Square is a shopping mall located at the intersection of Illinois Route 50 and Larry Power Road in Bradley, Illinois, United States. The mall serves Kankakee County, which includes Bourbonnais, Bradley, and Kankakee. The mall's anchor is Cinemark Theatres. There are four vacant anchor stores: two Carson Pirie Scott stores, Sears, and JCPenney.

== History ==
Northfield Square opened on August 1, 1990. The anchors were Carson Pirie Scott, JCPenney, Sears, and Venture. When the mall opened, it was 40 percent vacant. In 2012, the mall was 11.7 percent vacant. On June 20, 2018, it was announced that Express Factory Outlet would open next to Carson Pirie Scott.

Sears closed on April 9, 2018. Later that year, Carson Pirie Scott closed both locations on August 29, 2018, when parent company The Bon-Ton Stores went out of business. JCPenney closed in October 2020, leaving the mall without a traditional anchor store. Cinemark Theatres is the largest current tenant.

The Village of Bradley purchased the vacant Carson's Men's Store anchor in October 2019 for redevelopment.

The annual Kankakee County Strawberry Jazz Festival takes place at the mall.

On February 14, 2025, the Village of Bradley purchased the rest of the mall from Namdar. The Village announced plans to plan to demolish the mall to build Illinois' largest water park.
