= Valentine-Seaver Company =

American furniture company

- Industry: Furniture company
- Founder: Louis Lincoln Valentine and Andrew E. Seaver
- Successor: Kroehler Manufacturing Company (acquired the company in 1927)
- Headquarters: United States
- Products: upholstery services, furniture design and production
- Revenue: $54,000 in 1903

The Valentine-Seaver Company was an American furniture company. It was founded by Louis Lincoln Valentine and Andrew E. Seaver. In 1927 it was acquired by the Kroehler Manufacturing Company. Designs by the company are held in the collection of the Cooper-Hewitt, National Design Museum.

== Founding history ==
In 1889, Louis Lincoln Valentine and W. J. Barnhart co-founded a furniture manufacturer in Chicago, Illinois. They rented floor space in a building on Michigan Avenue. At that time, they had only two staff members: a finisher and an upholster. Barnhart sold his portion of the business, in June 1889, to Andrew E. Seaver, hence the name Valentine-Seaver. That same year, on October 18, the company incorporated.

=== Louis Lincoln Valentine ===
Louis Lincoln Valentine came to Chicago after being a farmer. He also had previous experience working at his fathers furniture business, and upon arriving in Chicago in 1886, he started working at a furniture store a sales clerk. In 1887 he became a manager at Henry Strucker Furniture Company, before moving on to sales at Wakefield Rattan Company. Eventually, he would go on to co-found the Valentine-Seaver Company, serving as secretary and treasurer.

=== Andrew E. Seaver ===
Andrew E. Seaver also worked in agriculture before becoming dedicated to the furniture industry. In 1889 he arrived in Chicago and started working at the Johnson Chair Company. His uncles worked there. Just before leaving Johnson Chair Company, he became involved in what would become Valentine-Seaver. He served as president of the company.

== Production ==
At the beginning, the company started providing upholstery services to furniture companies in Chicago. Business was successful, and eventually Valentine-Seaver moved to a new building in 1901. The number of employees grew to sixteen. By 1903, the company sales totaled $54,000.
