= Salina Township, Kankakee County, Illinois =

Salina Township
- Township
- Location in Kankakee County

- Kankakee County's location in Illinois
- Coordinates: 41°10′N 88°4′W
- Country: United States
- State: Illinois
- County: Kankakee
- Established: April 7, 1854

Government
  - Supervisor: Jerald Dau

Area
  - Total: 36.59 sq mi (94.8 km^{2})
  - Land: 36.59 sq mi (94.8 km^{2})
  - Water: 0 sq mi (0 km^{2}) 0%
- Elevation: 617 ft (188 m)

Population (2020)
  - Total: 1,223
  - Density: 33.42/sq mi (12.91/km^{2})
- Time zone: UTC-6 (CST)
  - Summer (DST): UTC-5 (CDT)
- ZIP codes: 60481, 60901, 60913, 60935, 60941
- FIPS code: 17-091-67262

Salina Township is one of seventeen townships in Kankakee County, Illinois, USA. As of the 2020 census, its population was 1,223 and it contained 534 housing units. It was formed from part of Limestone Township on April 7, 1854.

== Geography ==
According to the 2021 census gazetteer files, Salina Township has a total area of 36.59 square miles (94.77 km^{2}), all land.

=== Cities, towns, villages ===
- Bonfield

=== Unincorporated towns ===
- Frielings at 41.166°N 88.113°W

(This list is based on USGS data and may include former settlements.)

=== Adjacent townships ===
- Rockville Township (northeast)
- Limestone Township (east)
- Pilot Township (south)
- Essex Township (west)
- Custer Township, Will County (northwest)

=== Cemeteries ===
The township contains these three cemeteries: Beach, Bonfield and Maple Grove.

=== Major highways ===
- Illinois Route 17

=== Airports and landing strips ===
- Hawker Airport

=== Landmarks ===
- Kankakee River State Park

== Demographics ==
As of the 2020 census there were 1,223 people, 576 households, and 491 families residing in the township. The population density was 33.43 inhabitants per square mile (12.91/km^{2}). There were 534 housing units at an average density of 14.60 per square mile (5.64/km^{2}). The racial makeup of the township was 94.11% White, 0.00% African American, 0.82% Native American, 0.25% Asian, 0.00% Pacific Islander, 0.82% from other races, and 4.01% from two or more races. Hispanic or Latino of any race were 3.43% of the population.

There were 576 households, out of which 19.40% had children under the age of 18 living with them, 66.49% were married couples living together, 7.99% had a female householder with no spouse present, and 14.76% were non-families. 12.70% of all households were made up of individuals, and 3.60% had someone living alone who was 65 years of age or older. The average household size was 2.39 and the average family size was 2.58.

The township's age distribution consisted of 12.9% under the age of 18, 10.0% from 18 to 24, 15.4% from 25 to 44, 35.4% from 45 to 64, and 26.4% who were 65 years of age or older. The median age was 52.3 years. For every 100 females, there were 98.7 males. For every 100 females age 18 and over, there were 96.7 males.

The median income for a household in the township was $69,539, and the median income for a family was $70,893. Males had a median income of $43,542 versus $30,697 for females. The per capita income for the township was $32,984. About 2.0% of families and 2.3% of the population were below the poverty line, including 0.0% of those under age 18 and 6.6% of those age 65 or over.

Historical population
Census	Pop.	Note	%±
2000	1,326		—
2010	1,396		5.3%
2020	1,223		−12.4%
U.S. Decennial Census

== Government ==
The township is governed by an elected Town Board of a Supervisor and four Trustees. The Township also has an elected Assessor, Clerk, Highway Commissioner and Supervisor. The Township Office is located at 3388 North 10000 West Road, Bonfield, IL 60913.

== Political districts ==
- Illinois's 11th congressional district
- State House District 75
- State Senate District 38

== School districts ==
- Herscher Community Unit School District 2
