= L'Erable, Illinois =

- Unincorporated community
- Iroquois County's location in Illinois

- L'Erable's location in Iroquois County
- Coordinates: 40°54′12″N 87°50′49″W
- Country: United States
- State: Illinois
- County: Iroquois County
- Township: Ashkum Township
- Elevation: 627 ft (191 m)
- Time zone: UTC-6 (Central (CST))
  - Summer (DST): UTC-5 (CDT)
- ZIP code: 60927
- GNIS feature ID: 0411634

L'Erable is an unincorporated community in Ashkum Township, Iroquois County, Illinois, United States.

== History ==
The area was settled by French Canadians in 1853 and 1854, and given the name L'Erable after the sugar maple (érable in French), planted by the settlers there.

== Geography ==
L'Erable is located at 40°54′12″N 87°50′49″W at an elevation of 627 feet.

=== Cemeteries ===
L'Erable Catholic Cemetery.
