= Roper (company) =

American stove manufacturer

- Formerly: Moser & Wehrle, Moser Wehrle and Co, Wehrle Co, Florence-Wehrle Company, Newark Stove Company
- Company type: Private company
- Industry: Home appliances
- Founded: 1883
- Founders: J. C. Wehrle and John Moser
- Defunct: 1943
- Fate: Acquired
- Successor: Sears
- Headquarters: Newark, Ohio, United States
- Area served: Worldwide
- Products: Stoves, lawnmowers
- Owner: Sears

Roper, formerly the Newark Stove Company, was an American stove manufacturer that was founded in 1883, location in Newark, Ohio. The company, once the largest stove producer in the world was purchased by Sears and was later known for its lawn mowers sold by Sears for many years.

== History ==
=== Founding and early years ===
The company was founded in 1883 as Moser & Wehrle by J. C. Wehrle and John Moser in Newark, Ohio, with the name later being changed to Moser Wehrle and Co. The name was again changed to Wehrle Co. by 1898.

It was originally a small foundry that was operated by only a few men, but the business later expanded when a site in the west of Newark was acquired by William W. Wehrle and August Wehrle. William Wehrle was the president and active head of the company while August Wehrle was the vice president and general manager. The main building was 140 feet (43 m) wide and 1,000 feet (300 m) long, where four cupolas were in operation. In a smaller building that was 140 by 650 feet (43 by 198 m), two cupolas were in operation along with other large structures that were used for assembling, mounting, polishing, and storing their merchandise. The company produced 1,400 stoves per day at their peak output. The payroll was $100,000 to $120,000 per month.

=== Later years ===
By 1933, the company had become the largest stove producer in the United States. The plant occupied a 40-acre site that included two miles of railroad sidings. In 1936, 60% of the company was bought by Sears, Roebuck, and Co. with the rest of its stock being purchased by the Florence Stove Company. For three years, the company name was the Florence-Wehrle Company, later being renamed to the Newark Stove Company in 1939. At that point, the company was the largest stove producer in the world. The company also produced artillery shells during World War II while producing stoves at the same time.

Sears purchased the remaining 40% of the company in 1943 and during this period, the building was remodeled for $750,000. In 1951, the company produced artillery shells for the Korean War while the stoves were produced at the same time. The company started manufacturing lawnmowers in 1953. In 1958, the company was renamed to Newark Ohio Company. The company acquired the stove division of George D. Roper Company in 1964, later being named Roper. After the merger, Sears owned 33% of the company.

=== Closure ===
In February 1969, the company's office workers went on strike and the company later closed the Newark factory in the mid-1970s because of that and other problems, moving production out of state. During this period they claimed to be the world's largest manufacturer of lawn mowers.
