= Herscher High School =

High school in Illinois, United States

Coordinates: 41.056778°N 88.099736°W

Location
- 501 North Main Street; Herscher, Kankakee County, Illinois 60941; United States

Information
- Type: Public high school
- Principal: Brett Miller
- Staff: 32.90 (on an FTE basis)
- Enrollment: 533 (2023-2024)
- Student to teacher ratio: 16.20
- Colors: Gold and black
- Nickname: Tigers

Herscher High School is a public high school in Herscher, Illinois, United States.

The school's mascot is the Tiger and the school colors are gold and black.

== History ==
Herscher High School's first graduating class in 1904 numbered seven students.

== Athletics ==
Herscher is a member of the Illinois Central Eight Conference and participates in state tournaments sponsored by the Illinois High School Association.

The school sponsors interscholastic sports teams for both men and women in basketball, bowling, cross country, soccer, and track and field. The school sponsors baseball, football, and wrestling for men, while sponsoring cheerleading, softball, and volleyball for women.

The following teams have placed in the top four of their respective state tournament sponsored by the Illinois High School Association:

- Men's Baseball – State Champion (1999)
- Women's Cross Country – State Champion (1991–1992, 1992–1993, 1996–1997)
- Women's Track and Field – State Champion (1996)

== Music ==
Herscher High School sponsors the following musical activities: chamber choir, colorguard, concert band, concert choir, jazz band, marching band, orchestra, pep band, and show choir.

The school's music program has won the Illinois High School Association Music Sweepstakes title a record 32 times. This record is more than any other school, outpacing its nearest competitor by at least double as of the 2009–2010 school year. They compete in class B. In 1982, the marching band won the overall title for the Bands Of America (then known as Marching Bands Of America) Summer National Championship. The Marching Tigers have also won the overall title of the Illinois State University Invitational Marching Band Championship three times (1980, 1981 and 1982).

== Other activities ==
The school also sponsors a computer club, class plays, FFA, a math team, National Honor Society, a scholastic bowl team, a Spanish club, a speech team, and student council.

== Notable alumni ==
- Scott Meents, professional basketball player.
- Kerry Schall, competed on the reality show The Ultimate Fighter 2, retired professional MMA fighter.
- Tyler Stuart, baseball player in the Washington Nationals organization.
- Steve Reick, Illinois Representative for the 63rd District.
- Helen Nethercutt, autism activist and businesswoman.
- Travis Richards, businessman.
- Tanner Regez, regular guy.
