= Milks Grove Township, Iroquois County, Illinois =

Milks Grove Township
- Township
- Location in Iroquois County

- Iroquois County's location in Illinois
- Coordinates: 40°57′12″N 88°04′35″W
- Country: United States
- State: Illinois
- County: Iroquois
- Established: Before 1921

Area
  - Total: 36.35 sq mi (94.1 km^{2})
  - Land: 36.35 sq mi (94.1 km^{2})
  - Water: 0 sq mi (0 km^{2}) 0%
- Elevation: 669 ft (204 m)

Population (2020)
  - Total: 204
  - Density: 5.61/sq mi (2.17/km^{2})
- Time zone: UTC-6 (CST)
  - Summer (DST): UTC-5 (CDT)
- ZIP codes: 60911, 60922, 60927, 60941
- FIPS code: 17-075-49074

Milks Grove Township is one of twenty-six townships in Iroquois County, Illinois, USA. As of the 2020 census, its population was 204 and it contained 75 housing units. Milks Grove Township formed from a portion of Chebanse Township on an unknown date, but before 1921. Milks Grove is named for the late 19th-century midwestern land speculator Lemuel Milk.

== Geography ==
According to the 2021 census gazetteer files, Milks Grove Township has a total area of 36.35 square miles (94.15 km^{2}), all land.

=== Cemeteries ===
The township contains Milk's Grove Cemetery.

=== Airports and landing strips ===
- Berns Airport
- Porter Airport

== Demographics ==
As of the 2020 census there were 204 people, 100 households, and 100 families residing in the township. The population density was 5.61 inhabitants per square mile (2.17/km^{2}). There were 75 housing units at an average density of 2.06 per square mile (0.80/km^{2}). The racial makeup of the township was 87.75% White, 0.00% African American, 0.49% Native American, 0.00% Asian, 0.00% Pacific Islander, 0.49% from other races, and 11.27% from two or more races. Hispanic or Latino of any race were 2.94% of the population.

There were 100 households, out of which 53.00% had children under the age of 18 living with them, 59.00% were married couples living together, 0.00% had a female householder with no spouse present, and 0.00% were non-families. No households were made up of individuals. The average household size was 2.30 and the average family size was 2.30.

The township's age distribution consisted of 26.1% under the age of 18, 6.1% from 18 to 24, 22.6% from 25 to 44, 20.9% from 45 to 64, and 24.3% who were 65 years of age or older. The median age was 42.9 years. For every 100 females, there were 82.5 males. For every 100 females age 18 and over, there were 136.1 males.

The median income for a household in the township was $52,358, and the median income for a family was $52,358. Males had a median income of $51,006 versus $18,750 for females. The per capita income for the township was $40,389. None of the population was below the poverty line.

Historical population
| Census | Pop. | Note | %± |
|---|---|---|---|
| 2000 | 177 | | — |
| 2010 | 214 | | 20.9% |
| 2020 | 204 | | −4.7% |
U.S. Decennial Census

== School districts ==
- Central Community Unit School District 4
- Herscher Community Unit School District 2

== Political districts ==
- Illinois' 15th congressional district
- State House District 105
- State Senate District 53
- Iroquois County Board District 1
