= Tracy, Illinois =

Ghost town in Illinois, U.S.

Coordinates: 41°10′10″N 88°14′2″W

Tracy is a ghost town in Essex Township, Kankakee County, Illinois.

Tracy was a relatively small settlement, amounting to possibly a dozen buildings, which housed coal miners exploiting a nearby coal seam in the 1800s; and it disappeared quickly around 1900, when the seam ran out. According to the 1892 Map of the Illinois Central Railroad, Tracy was located just northwest of Buckingham and served as a major spur from the later.
