= Kankakee State Hospital =

Shapiro Developmental Center formerly Kankakee State Hospital
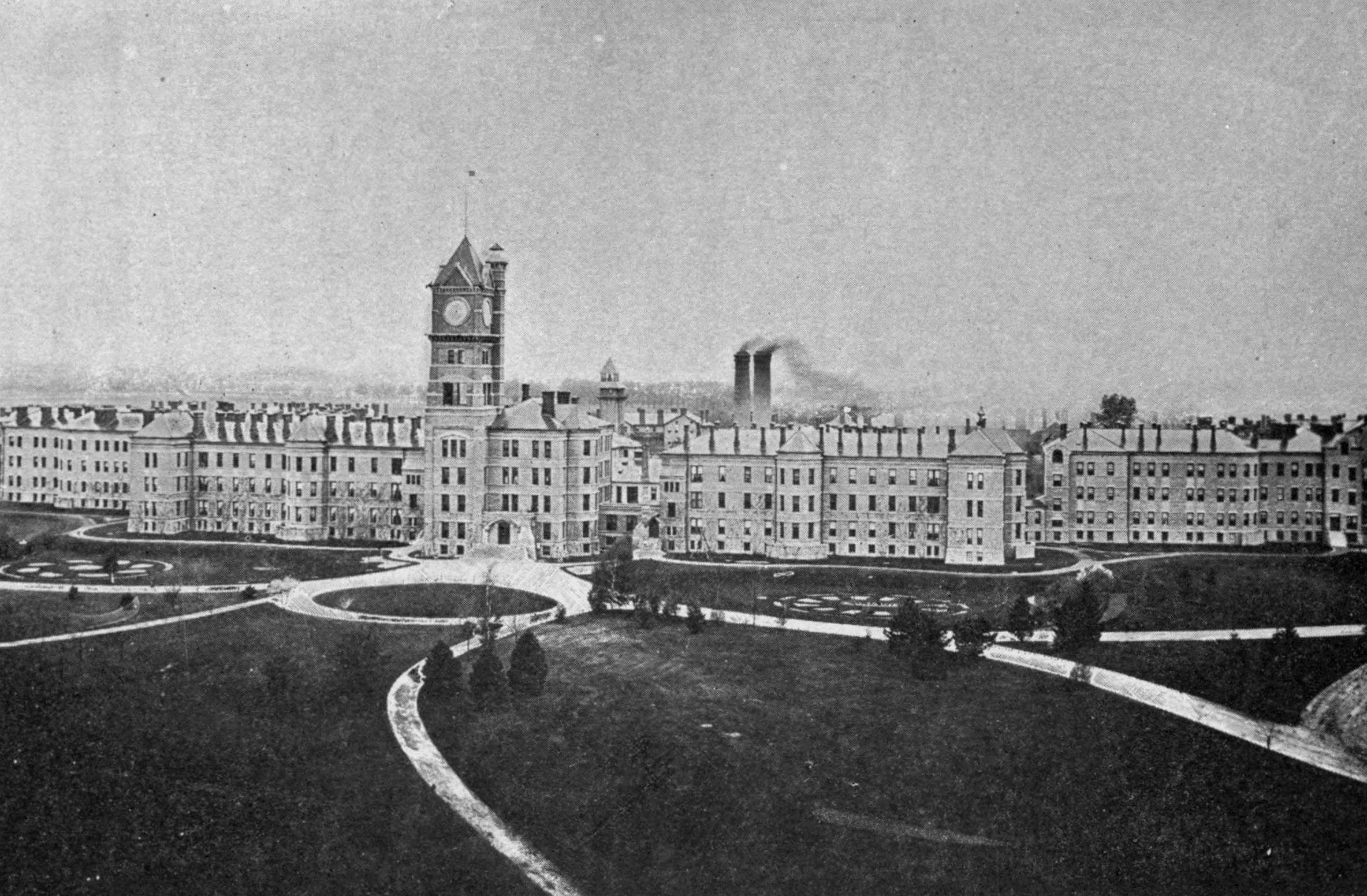
- The hospital in 1893

- Shown in Kankakee

Geography
- Location: 100 East Jeffery Street, Kankakee, Illinois, United States
- Coordinates: 41.1055021°N 87.8671829°W

Organization
- Care system: State hospital
- Type: Specialist

Services
- Speciality: Developmental Center

History
- Founded: September 4, 1879

Links
- Lists: Hospitals in Illinois
- Kankakee State Hospital Historic District
- U.S. National Register of Historic Places
- U.S. Historic district
- Location within Illinois
- Location: 100 E. Jeffery St., Kankakee, Illinois
- Area: 119 acres (48 ha)
- Built: 1879
- Architect: Willet, James R.; Cleveland, H.W.S.
- Architectural style: Romanesque, Classical Revival
- NRHP reference No.: 95000987
- Added to NRHP: August 4, 1995

Samuel H. Shapiro Developmental Center, formerly named the Kankakee State Hospital, is a developmental center in Kankakee, Illinois, on the banks of the Kankakee River.

== History ==
In 1877, the General Assembly established the Illinois Eastern Hospital for the Insane and empowered the Governor to appoint a seven-member commission to select a site within northeastern Illinois on which to locate the institution. After selection of a site in Kankakee, three trustees were appointed by the Governor to supervise planning and construction, choose a superintendent, and operate the hospital, subject to inspection by the Board of State Commissioners of Public Charities.

The hospital opened on September 4, 1879, and began to operate a training school for nurses in 1886. When the Board of State Commissioners of Public Charities was abolished in 1909, the institute was reorganized and renamed Kankakee State Hospital, effective January 1, 1910.

In 1917, the Department of Public Welfare assumed responsibility for the Kankakee State Hospital and retained control until the creation of the Department of Mental Health in 1961 (L. 1961, p. 2666). On May 10, 1974, the institution became a center for the care and treatment of the developmentally disabled only. All other patients were transferred to other mental health facilities and the institution became the Shapiro Developmental Center. It was renamed the Samuel H. Shapiro Developmental Center in honor of the Illinois Governor, Samuel H. Shapiro (1968–1969), who had resided in Kankakee.

== Today ==
As of the end of fiscal year 2010, the center had an annual budget expenditure of US$68,111,000. As of the end of fiscal year 2008, the center had 1,119 employees, 587 residents and an annual cost per resident of $175,844. The Shapiro Center was generating and submitting to the state treasury, 65% of its total operational costs.

There are underground utility tunnels leading from building to building in the facility. These tunnels were similar to nearby Manteno State Hospital's tunnels. This is a result of having a central steam plant for building heating, and it is typical of hospitals constructed under the Kirkbride Plan.

== Notable staff ==
- Adolf Meyer
