= Chebanse, Illinois =

- Village
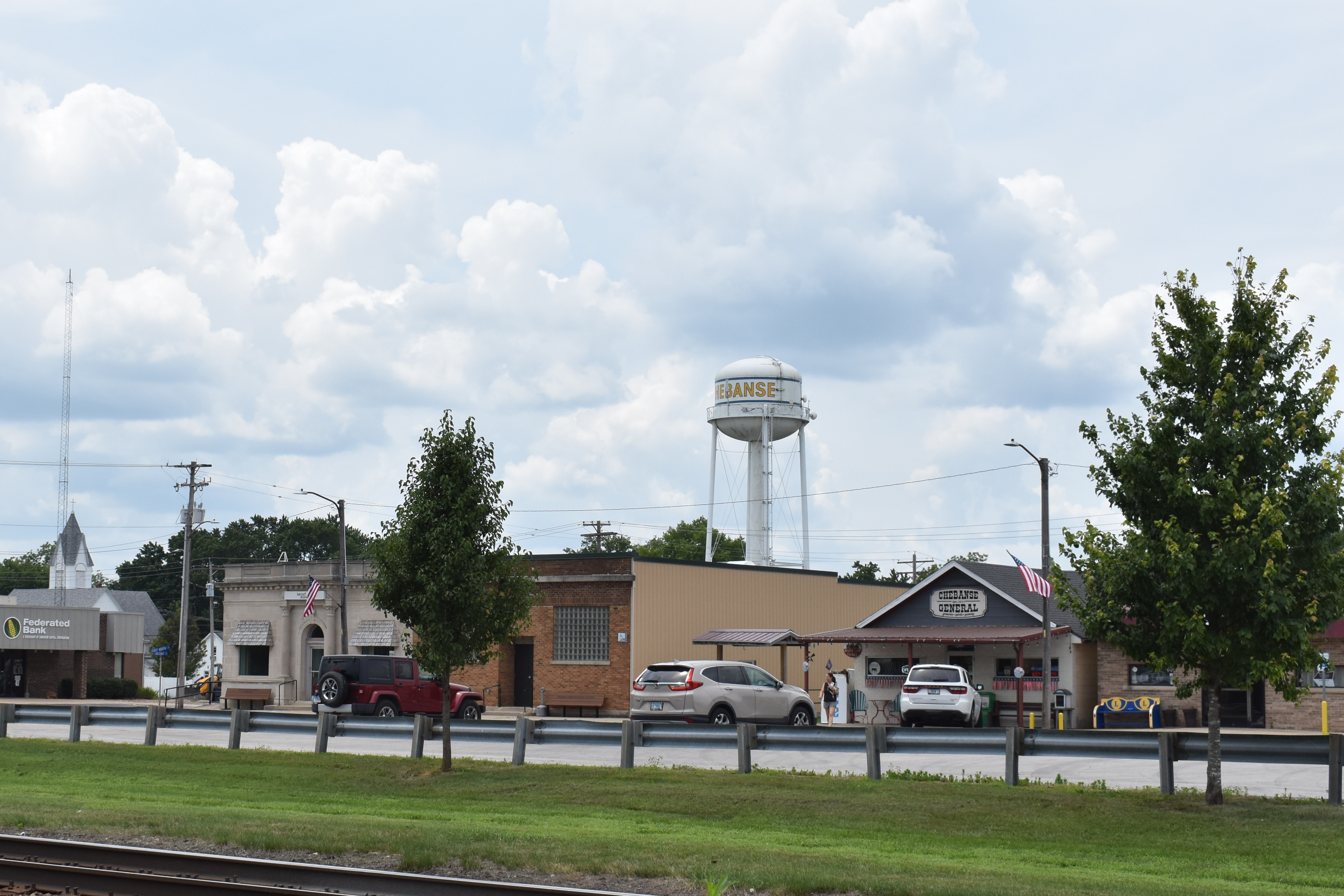
- Chebanse in July 2026

- Location of Chebanse in Iroquois County, Illinois
- Coordinates: 41°00′02″N 87°54′37″W
- Country: United States
- State: Illinois
- Counties: Iroquois, Kankakee
- Townships: Chebanse, Otto

Area
  - Total: 1.19 sq mi (3.08 km^{2})
  - Land: 1.19 sq mi (3.08 km^{2})
  - Water: 0 sq mi (0.00 km^{2})
- Elevation: 666 ft (203 m)

Population (2020)
  - Total: 1,044
  - Density: 877.6/sq mi (338.86/km^{2})
- Time zone: UTC-6 (CST)
  - Summer (DST): UTC-5 (CDT)
- ZIP code: 60922
- Area code: 815
- FIPS code: 17-12801
- GNIS feature ID: 2397609
- Website: www.chebanseillinois.org

Chebanse is a village in Iroquois and Kankakee counties in the U.S. state of Illinois. The population was 1,044 at the 2020 census. The Kankakee County portion of Chebanse is included in the Kankakee-Bradley, Illinois Metropolitan Statistical Area.

== History ==
Chebanse was established in 1854 as the first stop on the Illinois Central Railroad south of Kankakee.

"Chebanse" derives from zhishibéns, meaning "the little duck" in the Potawatomi language.

== Geography ==
Chebanse is located on the border between Iroquois and Kankakee counties. Interstate 57 passes the eastern edge of the village, with access from Exit 302. I-57 leads north 9 miles (14 km) to Kankakee and south 65 miles (105 km) to Champaign. Chicago is 68 miles (109 km) north of Chebanse.

According to the 2021 census gazetteer files, Chebanse has a total area of 1.19 square miles (3.08 km^{2}), all land.

Chebanse is partly located in Iroquois County, but a portion extends northward into Kankakee County, thus into the Chicago metropolitan area.

== Demographics ==
Historical population
Census	Pop.	Note	%±
1880	723		—
1890	616		−14.8%
1900	555		−9.9%
1910	590		6.3%
1920	541		−8.3%
1930	523		−3.3%
1940	603		15.3%
1950	739		22.6%
1960	995		34.6%
1970	1,185		19.1%
1980	1,191		0.5%
1990	1,082		−9.2%
2000	1,148		6.1%
2010	1,062		−7.5%
2020	1,044		−1.7%
U.S. Decennial Census

=== 2020 census ===
As of the 2020 census, Chebanse had a population of 1,044. The median age was 41.2 years. 23.9% of residents were under the age of 18 and 19.1% of residents were 65 years of age or older. For every 100 females there were 94.8 males, and for every 100 females age 18 and over there were 89.5 males age 18 and over.

0.0% of residents lived in urban areas, while 100.0% lived in rural areas.

There were 423 households in Chebanse, of which 34.3% had children under the age of 18 living in them. Of all households, 52.5% were married-couple households, 17.0% were households with a male householder and no spouse or partner present, and 24.1% were households with a female householder and no spouse or partner present. About 22.4% of all households were made up of individuals and 10.9% had someone living alone who was 65 years of age or older. The average household size was 2.80 and the average family size was 2.52.

There were 443 housing units, of which 4.5% were vacant. The homeowner vacancy rate was 0.0% and the rental vacancy rate was 6.5%. The population density was 877.31 inhabitants per square mile (338.73/km^{2}), and the average housing-unit density was 372.27 per square mile (143.73/km^{2}).

Racial composition as of the 2020 census
Race	Number	Percent
White	956	91.6%
Black or African American	7	0.7%
American Indian and Alaska Native	1	0.1%
Asian	6	0.6%
Native Hawaiian and Other Pacific Islander	0	0.0%
Some other race	16	1.5%
Two or more races	58	5.6%
Hispanic or Latino (of any race)	38	3.6%

=== Income and poverty ===
The median income for a household in the village was $73,239, and the median income for a family was $80,302. Males had a median income of $40,195 versus $35,083 for females. The per capita income for the village was $31,063. About 4.1% of families and 4.1% of the population were below the poverty line, including 8.6% of those under age 18 and 7.1% of those age 65 or over.

== Notable people ==
- Harold Gray, creator of the Little Orphan Annie comic strip, grew up on a farm near Chebanse
