= Essex Township, Kankakee County, Illinois =

Essex Township
- Township
- Location in Kankakee County

- Kankakee County's location in Illinois
- Coordinates: 41°09′32″N 88°11′19″W
- Country: United States
- State: Illinois
- County: Kankakee
- Established: August 1, 1855

Government
  - Supervisor: Don Babjak

Area
  - Total: 36.25 sq mi (93.9 km^{2})
  - Land: 35.65 sq mi (92.3 km^{2})
  - Water: 0.59 sq mi (1.5 km^{2}) 1.63%
- Elevation: 584 ft (178 m)

Population (2020)
  - Total: 1,512
  - Density: 42.41/sq mi (16.38/km^{2})
- Time zone: UTC-6 (CST)
  - Summer (DST): UTC-5 (CDT)
- ZIP codes: 60424, 60481, 60913, 60917, 60935, 60941, 60961
- FIPS code: 17-091-24465
- Website: www.essextownship-il.org

Essex Township is one of seventeen townships in Kankakee County, Illinois, USA. As of the 2020 census, its population was 1,512 and it contained 676 housing units.

== History ==
The now lost towns of Tracy, Oklahoma, and Clarke City, which housed coal miners in the 1800s, were located in Essex Township.

== Geography ==
According to the 2021 census gazetteer files, Essex Township has a total area of 36.25 square miles (93.89 km^{2}), of which 35.65 square miles (92.33 km^{2}) (or 98.37%) is land and 0.59 square miles (1.53 km^{2}) (or 1.63%) is water.

=== Cities, towns, villages ===
- Essex

=== Adjacent townships ===
- Reed Township, Will County (north)
- Custer Township, Will County (northeast)
- Salina Township (east)
- Pilot Township (southeast)
- Norton Township (south)
- Greenfield Township, Grundy County (west)
- Braceville Township, Grundy County (northwest)

=== Cemeteries ===
The township contains these two cemeteries: North Essex and South Essex.

=== Major highways ===
- Illinois Route 17

=== Airports and landing strips ===
- Lagrange Airport
- Rashs Acres Airport

== Demographics ==
As of the 2020 census there were 1,512 people, 589 households, and 471 families residing in the township. The population density was 41.72 inhabitants per square mile (16.11/km^{2}). There were 676 housing units at an average density of 18.65 per square mile (7.20/km^{2}). The racial makeup of the township was 92.66% White, 0.26% African American, 0.40% Native American, 0.26% Asian, 0.00% Pacific Islander, 2.45% from other races, and 3.97% from two or more races. Hispanic or Latino of any race were 4.37% of the population.

There were 589 households, out of which 35.00% had children under the age of 18 living with them, 64.35% were married couples living together, 9.85% had a female householder with no spouse present, and 20.03% were non-families. 19.00% of all households were made up of individuals, and 10.00% had someone living alone who was 65 years of age or older. The average household size was 2.80 and the average family size was 3.14.

The township's age distribution consisted of 27.4% under the age of 18, 5.0% from 18 to 24, 27.1% from 25 to 44, 24.7% from 45 to 64, and 15.7% who were 65 years of age or older. The median age was 39.3 years. For every 100 females, there were 90.8 males. For every 100 females age 18 and over, there were 100.0 males.

The median income for a household in the township was $90,250, and the median income for a family was $98,628. Males had a median income of $77,500 versus $32,074 for females. The per capita income for the township was $41,607. About 2.3% of families and 4.1% of the population were below the poverty line, including 5.9% of those under age 18 and 13.1% of those age 65 or over.

Historical population
Census	Pop.	Note	%±
2000	1,344		—
2010	1,480		10.1%
2020	1,512		2.2%
U.S. Decennial Census

== Government ==
The township is governed by an elected Town Board of a Supervisor and four Trustees. The Township also has an elected Assessor, Clerk, Highway Commissioner and Supervisor. The Township Office is located at 315 North Pine, Essex, IL 60935.

== Political districts ==
- Illinois's 11th congressional district
- State House District 75
- State Senate District 38

== School districts ==
- Herscher Community Unit School District 2
- Reed Custer Community Unit School District 255U
