= Chebanse Township, Iroquois County, Illinois =

Chebanse Township
- Township
- Location in Iroquois County

- Iroquois County's location in Illinois
- Coordinates: 40°57′33″N 87°55′04″W
- Country: United States
- State: Illinois
- County: Iroquois
- Established: November 6, 1855

Area
  - Total: 63.97 sq mi (165.7 km^{2})
  - Land: 63.77 sq mi (165.2 km^{2})
  - Water: 0.2 sq mi (0.52 km^{2}) 0.31%
- Elevation: 646 ft (197 m)

Population (2020)
  - Total: 2,862
  - Density: 44.88/sq mi (17.33/km^{2})
- Time zone: UTC-6 (CST)
  - Summer (DST): UTC-5 (CDT)
- ZIP codes: 60911, 60922, 60927
- FIPS code: 17-075-12814

Chebanse Township is one of twenty-six townships in Iroquois County, Illinois, USA. As of the 2020 census, its population was 2,862 and it contained 1,213 housing units.

== Geography ==
According to the 2021 census gazetteer files, Chebanse Township has a total area of 63.97 square miles (165.68 km^{2}), of which 63.77 square miles (165.16 km^{2}) (or 99.69%) is land and 0.20 square miles (0.52 km^{2}) (or 0.31%) is water.

=== Cities, towns, villages ===
- Chebanse (south three-quarters)
- Clifton

=== Cemeteries ===
The township contains Saint Mary & Joseph Cemetery and Evergreen Cemetery.

=== Major highways ===
- Interstate 57
- U.S. Route 45

=== Airports and landing strips ===
- Nottke Airport

== Demographics ==
As of the 2020 census there were 2,862 people, 1,207 households, and 879 families residing in the township. The population density was 44.74 inhabitants per square mile (17.27/km^{2}). There were 1,213 housing units at an average density of 18.96 per square mile (7.32/km^{2}). The racial makeup of the township was 93.40% White, 0.59% African American, 0.10% Native American, 0.35% Asian, 0.00% Pacific Islander, 0.59% from other races, and 4.96% from two or more races. Hispanic or Latino of any race were 3.56% of the population.

There were 1,207 households, out of which 30.10% had children under the age of 18 living with them, 60.98% were married couples living together, 6.38% had a female householder with no spouse present, and 27.17% were non-families. 24.80% of all households were made up of individuals, and 10.90% had someone living alone who was 65 years of age or older. The average household size was 2.34 and the average family size was 2.76.

The township's age distribution consisted of 23.9% under the age of 18, 4.2% from 18 to 24, 28.7% from 25 to 44, 23.5% from 45 to 64, and 19.7% who were 65 years of age or older. The median age was 39.3 years. For every 100 females, there were 90.8 males. For every 100 females age 18 and over, there were 96.1 males.

The median income for a household in the township was $67,798, and the median income for a family was $81,378. Males had a median income of $52,813 versus $30,956 for females. The per capita income for the township was $29,915. About 9.0% of families and 10.8% of the population were below the poverty line, including 18.0% of those under age 18 and 6.0% of those age 65 or over.

Historical population
Census	Pop.	Note	%±
2000	3,046		—
2010	3,109		2.1%
2020	2,862		−7.9%
U.S. Decennial Census

== School districts ==
- Central Community Unit School District 4

== Political districts ==
- Illinois' 15th congressional district
- State House District 75
- State House District 105
- State Senate District 38
- State Senate District 53
- Iroquois County Board District 1
