= Herscher, Illinois =

- Village
- Motto: "Small Town America at Its Best"
- Location of Herscher in Illinois

- Location of Illinois in the United States
- Coordinates: 41°02′57″N 88°06′02″W
- Country: United States
- State: Illinois
- County: Kankakee
- Township: Pilot

Government
  - Village president: Shannon Sweeney

Area
  - Total: 1.81 sq mi (4.70 km^{2})
  - Land: 1.81 sq mi (4.70 km^{2})
  - Water: 0 sq mi (0.00 km^{2})
- Elevation: 659 ft (201 m)

Population (2020)
  - Total: 1,521
  - Density: 838.8/sq mi (323.86/km^{2})
- Time zone: UTC-6 (CST)
  - Summer (DST): UTC-5 (CDT)
- ZIP code: 60941
- Area codes: 815 & 779
- FIPS code: 17-34384
- GNIS feature ID: 2398494
- Wikimedia Commons: Herscher, Illinois
- Website: https://herscher.net/

Herscher is a village in Kankakee County, Illinois, United States. The population was 1,521 at the 2020 census. It is part of the Kankakee–Bradley metropolitan area.

== Geography ==
Herscher is located in southwestern Kankakee County. Illinois Route 115 forms the northern edge of the village; the highway leads east 16 miles (26 km) to Kankakee, the county seat.

According to the 2021 census gazetteer files, Herscher has a total area of 1.81 square miles (4.69 km^{2}), all land.

== Demographics ==
Historical population
Census	Pop.	Note	%±
1880	103		—
1890	224		117.5%
1900	384		71.4%
1910	461		20.1%
1920	449		−2.6%
1930	426		−5.1%
1940	416		−2.3%
1950	515		23.8%
1960	658		27.8%
1970	988		50.2%
1980	1,214		22.9%
1990	1,278		5.3%
2000	1,523		19.2%
2010	1,591		4.5%
2020	1,521		−4.4%
U.S. Decennial Census

=== 2020 census ===
As of the 2020 census, Herscher had a population of 1,521, with 607 households and 402 families. The population density was 838.94 inhabitants per square mile (323.92/km^{2}). There were 643 housing units at an average density of 354.66 per square mile (136.93/km^{2}).

The median age was 40.0 years. 23.7% of residents were under the age of 18 and 19.9% were 65 years of age or older. For every 100 females, there were 94.8 males; for every 100 females age 18 and over, there were 90.5 males age 18 and over. 0.0% of residents lived in urban areas, while 100.0% lived in rural areas.

Of the 607 households, 31.1% had children under the age of 18 living in them. 52.1% were married-couple households, 14.0% were households with a male householder and no spouse or partner present, and 26.0% were households with a female householder and no spouse or partner present. About 26.2% of households were made up of individuals, and 17.8% had someone living alone who was 65 years of age or older. The average household size was 3.01 and the average family size was 2.43.

Of the housing units, 5.6% were vacant. The homeowner vacancy rate was 0.2% and the rental vacancy rate was 12.1%.

Racial composition as of the 2020 census
Race	Number	Percent
White	1,414	93.0%
Black or African American	8	0.5%
American Indian and Alaska Native	3	0.2%
Asian	7	0.5%
Native Hawaiian and Other Pacific Islander	0	0.0%
Some other race	13	0.9%
Two or more races	76	5.0%
Hispanic or Latino (of any race)	41	2.7%

=== Income and poverty ===
The median income for a household in the village was $67,404, and the median income for a family was $92,237. Males had a median income of $57,386 versus $40,647 for females. The per capita income for the village was $35,518. About 2.2% of families and 4.5% of the population were below the poverty line, including 2.1% of those under age 18 and 8.6% of those age 65 or over.

== Education ==
Herscher is the central location of the Herscher Community School District #2. The Village of Herscher is home to the Intermediate School (Grades 2-4) and Herscher High School (Grades 9-12). A Primary School (Grades PreK-1) and a Middle School (Grades 5-8) are located elsewhere in the 250 square mile district.

== Notable people ==
- Chris Bisaillon, College Football Hall of Fame inductee
