= Bradley, Illinois =

Bradley
- Village
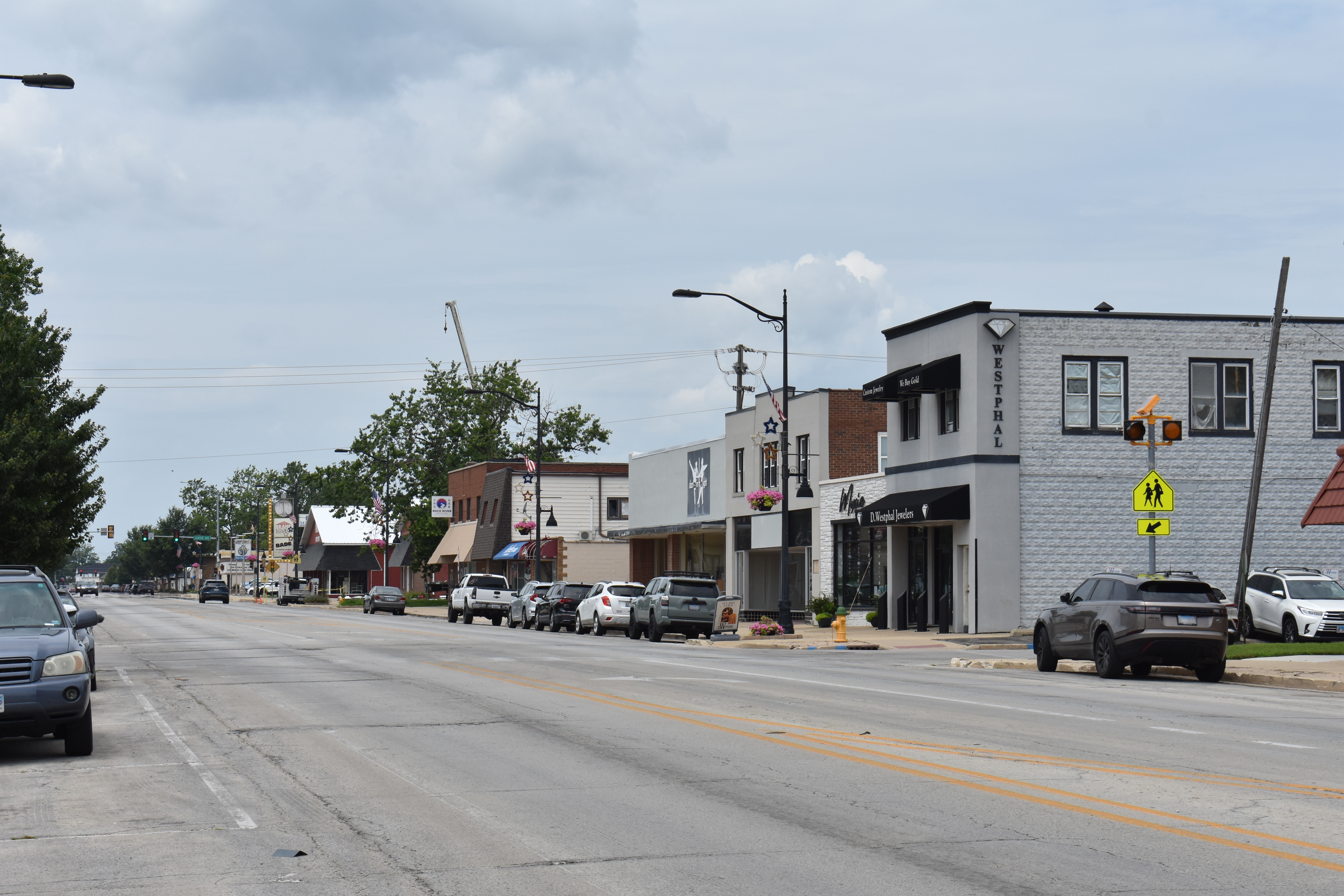
- Bradley in July 2026

- Location of Bradley in Illinois

- Location of Illinois in the United States
- Coordinates: 41°09′51″N 87°50′42″W
- Country: United States
- State: Illinois
- County: Kankakee
- Township: Bourbonnais
- Established: 1891

Government
  - Mayor: Michael Watson

Area
  - Total: 6.93 sq mi (17.95 km^{2})
  - Land: 6.93 sq mi (17.95 km^{2})
  - Water: 0 sq mi (0.00 km^{2})
- Elevation: 673 ft (205 m)

Population (2020)
  - Total: 15,419
  - Estimate (2025): 15,214
  - Density: 2,224.5/sq mi (858.87/km^{2})
- Time zone: UTC−6 (CST)
  - Summer (DST): UTC−5 (CDT)
- ZIP Code: 60915
- Area code: 815/779
- FIPS code: 17-07744
- GNIS feature ID: 2398163
- Website: www.bradleyil.org

Bradley (formerly North Kankakee) is a village in Kankakee County, Illinois, United States. It is a suburb of the city of Kankakee. The population was 15,419 at the 2020 census.

Bradley is a principal city of the Kankakee–Bradley Metropolitan Statistical Area, which includes all of Kankakee County. The county is also part of the larger Chicago–Naperville–Michigan City, IL-IN-WI Combined Statistical Area.

Bradley is home to the Northfield Square Mall.

== History ==
In 1891, North Kankakee was established when the David Bradley Plow Works established a factory, and in recognition of this, in 1895, the town changed its name to "Bradley City" (later Bradley). Bradley was mostly a blue collar town, with the Kroehler furniture factory and the Roper stove factory, a subsidiary of Sears, Roebuck, being the major employers.

In the 1980s, as elsewhere in the Midwest, these factories closed, and after their closures, parts of those factories burned to the ground. However, by the end of the decade, things changed. In 1989, a new shopping center called Bradley Square was built with Wal-Mart as the first tenant, and more shops followed. Northfield Square Mall opened in 1990.

== Geography ==
Bradley is located in central Kankakee County. It is bordered to the south by the city of Kankakee and to the west by the village of Bourbonnais. Interstate 57 passes through the village, with access from Exit 315 (Illinois Route 50). I-57 leads north 56 miles (90 km) to Chicago and south 76 miles (122 km) to Champaign.

According to the 2021 census gazetteer files, Bradley has a total area of 6.93 square miles (17.95 km^{2}), all land.

== Demographics ==
Historical population
Census	Pop.	Note	%±
1900	1,518		—
1910	1,942		27.9%
1920	2,128		9.6%
1930	3,048		43.2%
1940	3,689		21.0%
1950	5,699		54.5%
1960	8,082		41.8%
1970	9,881		22.3%
1980	11,015		11.5%
1990	10,792		−2.0%
2000	12,784		18.5%
2010	15,895		24.3%
2020	15,419		−3.0%
2025 (est.)	15,214		−1.3%
U.S. Decennial Census

=== 2020 census ===
As of the 2020 census, Bradley had a population of 15,419, with 6,208 households and 3,753 families. The median age was 37.0 years. 23.6% of residents were under the age of 18 and 14.5% of residents were 65 years of age or older. For every 100 females there were 92.7 males, and for every 100 females age 18 and over there were 90.6 males age 18 and over.

99.6% of residents lived in urban areas, while 0.4% lived in rural areas.

There were 6,208 households in Bradley, of which 32.8% had children under the age of 18 living in them. Of all households, 42.3% were married-couple households, 19.1% were households with a male householder and no spouse or partner present, and 30.2% were households with a female householder and no spouse or partner present. About 29.5% of all households were made up of individuals and 11.5% had someone living alone who was 65 years of age or older.

There were 6,592 housing units, of which 5.8% were vacant. The homeowner vacancy rate was 1.8% and the rental vacancy rate was 7.0%.

Racial composition as of the 2020 census
Race	Number	Percent
White	11,777	76.4%
Black or African American	1,463	9.5%
American Indian and Alaska Native	56	0.4%
Asian	232	1.5%
Native Hawaiian and Other Pacific Islander	0	0.0%
Some other race	663	4.3%
Two or more races	1,228	8.0%
Hispanic or Latino (of any race)	1,563	10.1%

=== Income and poverty ===
The median income for a household in the village was $54,824, and the median income for a family was $68,360. Males had a median income of $45,392 versus $29,319 for females. The per capita income for the village was $26,813. About 8.3% of families and 10.0% of the population were below the poverty line, including 13.6% of those under age 18 and 7.7% of those age 65 or over.

== Places of local interest ==
- Northfield Square Mall

== Economy ==
CSL Behring operates a large manufacturing plant near the southern portions of the village. The facility produces plasma derived medications and equipment. In 2018 it was announced that the existing plant was to undergo a massive expansion that could possibly take up to twelve years to complete. The company bought up land to the south of the existing facility that previously housed a cooking oils plant operated by Bunge Limited, and plans to build upon that open space as a part of the large upgrade. The old cooking oils plant had ceased operations in 2015. Once complete, the plant will be split into two portions- the north campus, which includes the now upgraded existing plant, and the south campus- the new property that is currently being constructed. The project is expected to create over 200 jobs and is accruing about 450 million dollars in construction expenses.

Monical's Pizza, an American regional pizza chain (locations in Illinois, Indiana, Missouri and Wisconsin), has its corporate headquarters in Bradley.

== Transportation ==
River Valley Metro provides bus service on multiple routes connecting Bradley to destinations in the Kankakee area. Bradley is located along the Illinois Central Main Line.
