= Interstate 57 =

Interstate Highway in Arkansas, Missouri, and Illinois

Interstate 57
- I-57 highlighted in red

Route information
- Maintained by ArDOT, MoDOT and IDOT
- Length: 508.92 mi (819.03 km)
- Existed: August 14, 1957–present
- NHS: Entire route

Arkansas segment
- Length: 122.80 mi (197.63 km)
- South end: I-40 / US 67 / US 167 in North Little Rock, AR
- Major intersections: I-440 in Jacksonville, AR; US 64 / US 167 in Bald Knob, AR; US 78 / AR 226 near Swifton, AR; US 63 / US 412 in Walnut Ridge, AR
- North end: US 67 / US 412 / US 412B in Walnut Ridge, AR

Original segment
- Length: 386.12 mi (621.40 km)
- South end: I-55 / US 60 in Sikeston, MO
- Major intersections: I-24 in Pulleys Mill, IL; I-64 in Mt. Vernon, IL; I-70 in Effingham, IL; I-72 / I-74 in Champaign, IL; I-80 in Country Club Hills, IL; I-294 in Blue Island, IL
- North end: I-94 in Chicago, IL

Location
- Country: United States
- States: Arkansas, Missouri, Illinois
- Counties: AR: Pulaski, Lonoke, White, Jackson, Craighead, Lawrence; MO: Scott, Mississippi; IL: Alexander, Pulaski, Union, Johnson, Williamson, Franklin, Jefferson, Marion, Fayette, Clay, Effingham, Shelby, Cumberland, Coles, Douglas, Champaign, Ford, Iroquois, Kankakee, Will, Cook

Highway system
- Interstate Highway System; Main; Auxiliary; Suffixed; Business; Future
- Arkansas Highway System; Interstate; US; State; Business; Spurs; Suffixed; Scenic; Heritage
- Missouri State Highway System; Interstate; US; State; Supplemental
- Illinois State Highway System; Interstate; US; State; Tollways; Scenic
← AR 56	AR	→ AR 57
← US 56	MO	→ Route 58
← IL 56	IL	→ IL 57
← AR 642	AR 657	→ AR 801

Interstate 57 (I-57) is a north–south Interstate Highway that exists in two segments. It runs through Arkansas, Missouri, and Illinois. I-57 parallels the old Illinois Central Railroad for much of its route east of I-55. The Interstate begins at I-40 in North Little Rock, Arkansas, traveling northward concurrently with U.S. Highway 67 (US 67) until it reaches Walnut Ridge, Arkansas, where the Interstate ends as of 2024. I-57 will run northward to meet up with the existing segment in southeastern Missouri. I-57 resumes its run from Sikeston, Missouri, at I-55 to Chicago, Illinois, at I-94. I-57 essentially serves as a shortcut route for travelers headed between the Southern United States (Memphis, New Orleans, etc.) and Chicago, bypassing St. Louis, Missouri and Springfield, Illinois.

Between the junction of I-55 and I-57 in Sikeston and the junction of I-55 and I-90/I-94 in Chicago, I-55 travels for 436 miles (702 km), while the combination of I-57 and I-94 is only 396 miles (637 km) long between the same two points. In fact, both the control cities on the overhead signs and the destination mileage signs reference Memphis along southbound I-57, even as far north as its northern origin at I-94 in Chicago. Likewise, at its southern end in Missouri, Chicago is the control city listed for I-57 on signs on northbound I-55 south of Sikeston, even though I-55 also goes to Chicago.

A southward extension of I-57 from Sikeston, Missouri to North Little Rock, Arkansas, is currently in various stages of development and completion. On November 7, 2024, 122.80 miles (197.63 km) of US 67 from North Little Rock to Walnut Ridge was officially redesignated as I-57. Signs started going up in March 2025.

== Route description ==
Lengths
	mi	km
AR	122.80	197.63
MO	21.96	35.34
IL	364.16	586.06
Total	508.92	819.03

=== Arkansas ===
In Arkansas, I-57 begins in North Little Rock at I-40, running concurrently with US 67 and US 167. I-440 westbound begins at the junction of the two Interstates in Jacksonville. I-57 continues northbound through Jacksonville, and the Interstate temporarily narrows from six lanes to four lanes at the Main Street interchange. I-57 is four lanes until it widens back to six lanes just north of the Vandenberg Boulevard interchange (exit 11). I-57 widens back to six lanes for five miles (8.0 km) northbound until an interchange with Highway 5 (AR 5) and AR 89 in Cabot. At this point, the Interstate reverts to four lanes as it continues north through Cabot. (Note: Construction to widen I-57 to six lanes between Main Street and Vandenburg Boulevard in Jacksonville and the AR 5/AR 89 interchange is ongoing and is expected to be complete sometime in 2027.) After the AR 5/AR 89 interchange in Cabot, I-57 reverts to four lanes until it ends in Walnut Ridge. In Beebe, US 64 runs concurrently with the Interstate and continues east for 27 miles (43 km) until exit 55 in Bald Knob where US 64 splits off to the east and US 167 splits off to the north to Batesville. I-57 continues northbound from Bald Knob, through Newport to Walnut Ridge, where it runs concurrently with US 412. The Interstate ends at unsigned exit 124 in Walnut Ridge, where US 67 continues north to Pocahontas and US 412 splits off to the east.

=== Missouri ===
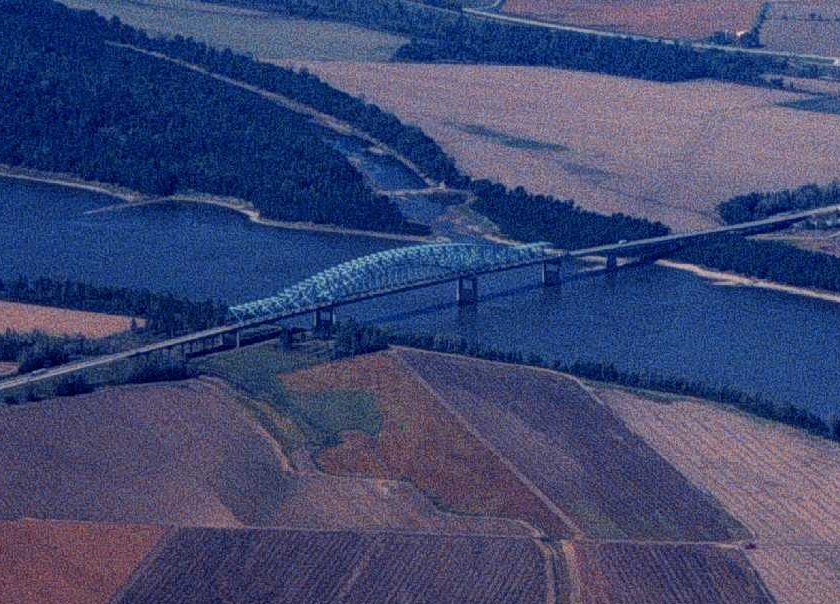
The Cairo I-57 Bridge between Missouri and Illinois

In Missouri, I-57 begins in Sikeston at a cloverleaf interchange with I-55 as a continuation of US 60 and heads east. Entering Charleston, the Interstate almost immediately interchanges with I-57 Bus./Route 105. Southeast of the city, it then turns to the northeast. To the east of Charleston, the US 60 concurrency ends after about 12 miles (19 km) when I-57 meets US 62/Route 77, with US 60 heading eastward and I-57 Bus. ending. I-57 eventually meets the Missouri–Illinois state line at the Mississippi River, crossing the Cairo I-57 Bridge into Cairo, Illinois.

=== Illinois ===
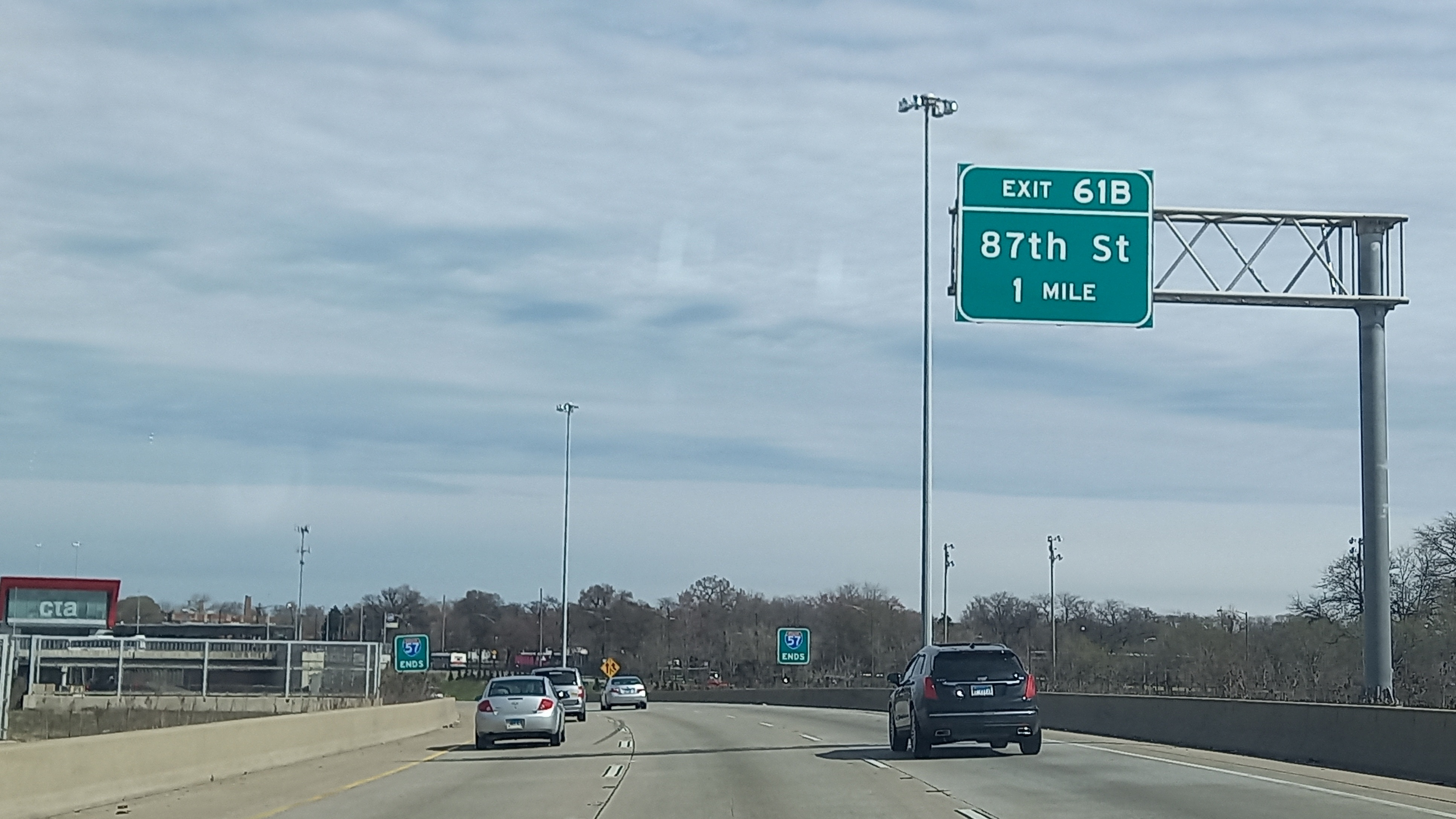
Northern terminus of I-57 at I-94

I-57 is the longest Interstate Highway in the state of Illinois, spanning 364.16 miles (586.06 km) long with Chicago being the main city along its northern route and Memphis being the southern main city along its southern route. I-57 then enters Illinois across the Mississippi River into Cairo. It passes through Mounds and Ullin, and then it makes an interchange with US 51, making US 51 depart from its temporary concurrency with the Interstate. I-57 then continues north and has an interchange with I-24 toward Nashville, Tennessee. It then continues to head toward Marion, West Frankfort, Benton, Whittington, and Ina and then heads into Mount Vernon. In Mount Vernon, I-57 has a short concurrency with I-64 while making two diamond interchanges with the city's streets. I-64 then leaves I-57 and continues its western route toward St. Louis, Missouri, while I-57 continues toward Effingham. In Effingham, I-70 joins I-57 and makes interchanges with the city's streets once again. I-70 then departs from I-57 and continues east toward Terre Haute and Indianapolis, Indiana. As for I-57, it continues and heads toward Mattoon where it has a cloverleaf interchange with US 45 and then heads toward Champaign where it meets the terminus of I-72 in a cloverleaf interchange. It then travels for another two miles (3.2 km) and then meets up with a soon to be changed from a cloverleaf interchange to a semi-directional interchange with I-74 going east toward Indianapolis (again) and west toward Bloomington. The Interstate then heads toward Kankakee and then into Cook County where it meets its own terminus with I-94 ending in Chicago.

== History ==
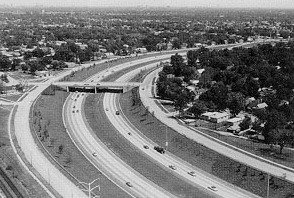
The Dan Ryan Expressway West Leg (now more commonly referred to as I-57) at 99th Street in 1970

The oldest segment of I-57 is a 6.2-mile (10.0 km) strip running east of Bradley to Kankakee labeled on the 1959 Illinois state highway map. Two years later, a 33-mile (53 km) stretch of I-57 from Dongola north to Marion opened on September 26, 1961. Another portion between the Illinois Route 121 (IL 121)/US 45 exit and the Watson–Mason exit was completed and opened prior to July 1965, linking I-57 to I-70 and running in tandem with I-70 for several miles, with access to Indianapolis, Indiana, to the east and St. Louis, Missouri, to the west. A 21.5-mile (34.6 km) section of I-57 in Jefferson County from Bonnie (using a temporary road that is still partially visible from the northbound lanes) to IL 161 later opened on December 9, 1969. The portion of I-57 in Chicago (known as the Dan Ryan West Leg Extension) was constructed and opened in segments between 1963 and 1970. It remains the most recent Interstate Highway to be established within the city. The final section of I-57 in Illinois opened in December 1971 at Paxton.

The portion of I-43 from Milwaukee to Green Bay was originally numbered as I-57. The number was changed due to the existence of I-57 in Illinois.

I-57 was widened to six lanes in Effingham from 2011 until 2016.

For many years, an interchange at the junction of I-57 with I-294 did not exist. It was one of the few places in the U.S. where Interstates cross but have no interchange. The Illinois Department of Transportation (IDOT) and Illinois State Toll Highway Authority (ISTHA) opened Phase 1 of a new interchange in 2014, providing access from I-57 north to I-294 north and from I-294 south to I-57 south. Phase 2, which four of the remaining movements (northbound-to-southbound access being served by I-80), was opened to traffic on September 11, 2022.

On November 7, 2024, after over 50 years since the completion of the original route, 122.80 miles (197.63 km) of US 67 from North Little Rock to Walnut Ridge in Arkansas was officially redesignated to I-57, finally extending the Interstate to the state of Arkansas. Signs started going up in March 2025.

== Future ==
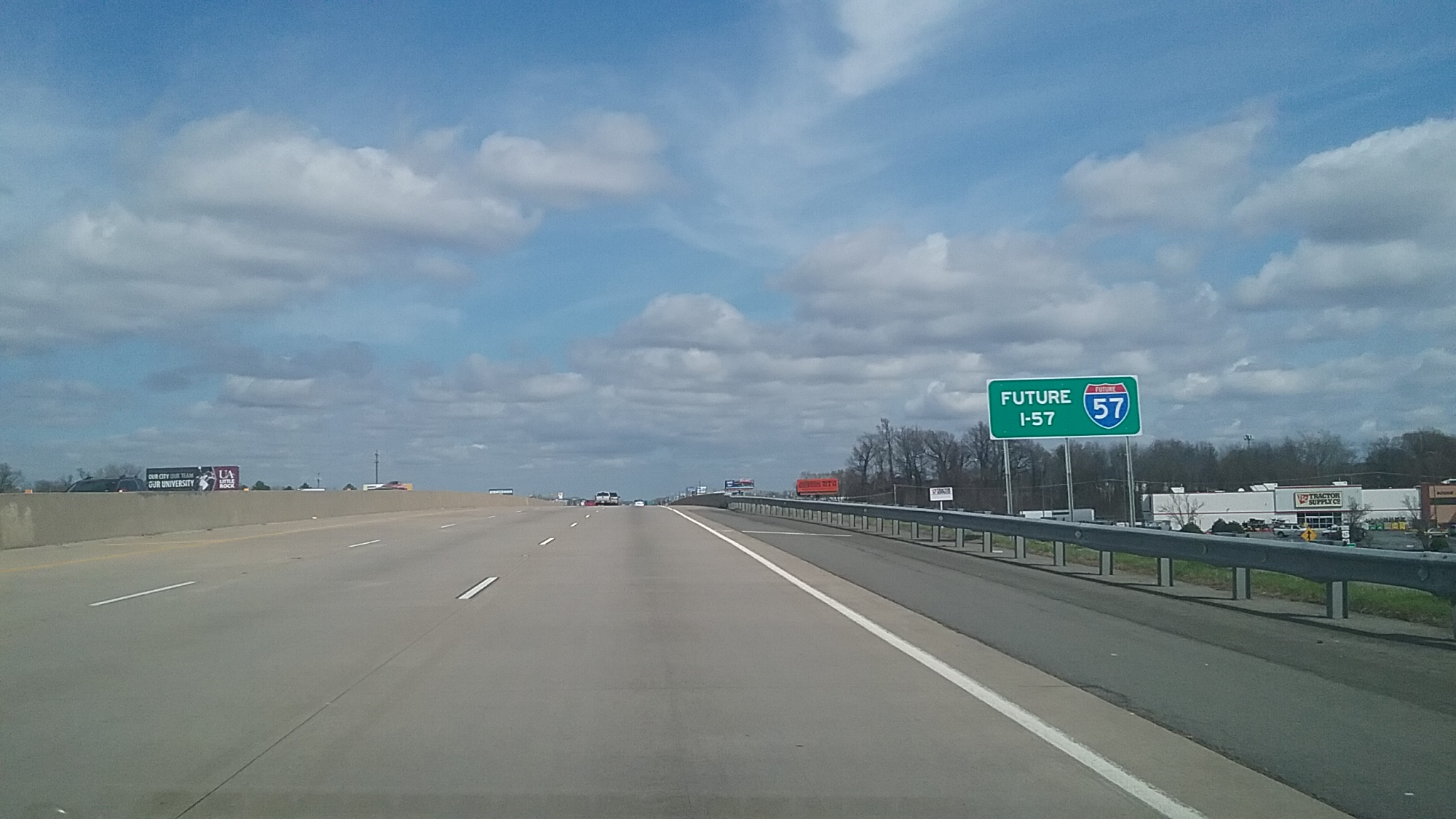
Sign for then Future I-57 in North Little Rock, Arkansas on March 1, 2018

I-57 is slated to eventually be extended west along US 60 to Poplar Bluff, Missouri, and then south along the US 67 corridor to Walnut Ridge, Arkansas, connecting to the existing (as of 2024) Arkansas segment of I-57. The extension is listed under High Priority Corridor 89, the I-57 Corridor Extension. In April 2016, a provision designating US 67 from North Little Rock to Walnut Ridge, Arkansas, as "Future I-57" was added into the federal fiscal year 2017 Transportation, Housing and Urban Development funding bill and officially became law in 2017. On November 7, 2024, the section of US 67 between North Little Rock and Walnut Ridge, Arkansas, was officially designated as I-57 by ArDOT.

Missouri has already converted 62 miles (100 km) of the US 60/US 67 corridor between Sikeston and US 160/Route 158 near Harviell to a mixture of freeway and expressway segments. All at-grade crossings along the corridor would have to be eliminated before the Interstate designation could be applied. This leaves about twelve miles (19 km) of new freeway between US 160/Route 158 to the Arkansas state line to be constructed.

In Arkansas, 118 miles (190 km) of I-57 runs from I-40 to US 412 in Walnut Ridge, leaving a segment of approximately 40 miles (64 km) of new Interstate-grade highway along US 67 that still would need to be built in northeastern Arkansas. The Arkansas Department of Transportation (ArDOT) announced in September 2023 that work to extend Future I-57 in Clay County would begin in late 2024 or early 2025 depending on when contracts are let along with completion of the final design process. The first section will be between the US 67 interchanges at Walnut Ridge and Corning while the second section (which will begin construction starting in 2025) will extend the first section northward to the Missouri state line. Plans for the Corning Bypass show Arkansas Highway 657 (AR 657) as a temporary designation for this section until other sections are completed. ARDOT broke ground on November 14, 2024 on the Corning Bypass.

== Exit list ==
State	County	Location	mi	km	Exit	Destinations	Notes
Arkansas	Pulaski	North Little Rock	0.0	0.0		I-40 west / US 67 south / US 167 south – Little Rock, Fort Smith	Southern end of US 67/US 167 concurrency; southern terminus
Arkansas	Pulaski	North Little Rock			155	I-40 east – Memphis	Southbound exit and northbound entrance; exit no. corresponds to I-40; exit 155 on I-40
Arkansas	Pulaski	North Little Rock	0.9– 1.2	1.4– 1.9	1	McCain Boulevard	Signed as exits 1A (east) and 1B (west) northbound
Arkansas	Pulaski	Sherwood	1.9	3.1	2	Trammel Road	Northbound exit only
Arkansas	Pulaski	Sherwood	3.2	5.1	3	Wildwood Avenue / Trammel Road	No northbound access to Trammel Road
Arkansas	Pulaski	Sherwood	3.9	6.3	4	AR 176Y north to Brockington Road	Northbound exit and southbound entrance; southern terminus of AR 176Y
Arkansas	Pulaski	Sherwood	4.3	6.9	5	AR 176 west (Kiehl Avenue)	Eastern terminus of AR 176
Arkansas	Pulaski	Jacksonville	6.0	9.7	6	I-440 west – Memphis, Texarkana	Current eastern terminus and exit 13 on I-440
Arkansas	Pulaski	Jacksonville	8.3	13.4	8	Redmond Road	Northbound exit and southbound entrance
Arkansas	Pulaski	Jacksonville	8.5	13.7	9	Main Street	
Arkansas	Pulaski	Jacksonville	9.2	14.8	10A	James Street	
Arkansas	Pulaski	Jacksonville	10.1	16.3	10B	1st Street / JP Wright Loop Road	
Arkansas	Pulaski	Jacksonville	10.6	17.1	11	AR 161 south / Vandenberg Boulevard	Northern terminus of AR 161
Arkansas	Lonoke		15.7– 16.0	25.3– 25.7	16	AR 5 north / AR 321 north / AR 367 north – Heber Springs, Cabot	Signed as exits 16A (AR 321) and exit 16B (AR 5) northbound
Arkansas	Lonoke	Cabot	18.4	29.6	19	AR 89 – Cabot	
Arkansas	Lonoke	Cabot	20.4	32.8	21	AR 38 east – Cabot	Western terminus of AR 38
Arkansas	Lonoke	Austin	21.6	34.8	22	AR 305 – Austin	
Arkansas	Lonoke	Ward	24.2	38.9	25	AR 319 – Ward	
Arkansas	White	Beebe	27.8	44.7	28	US 64 west / US 67B north – Beebe, Conway	Southern end of US 64 concurrency; southern terminus of US 67B
Arkansas	White	Beebe	28.8	46.3	29	AR 367S south – Beebe	Northern terminus of AR 367S
Arkansas	White	Beebe	30.1	48.4	31	US 67B south / AR 31 – Beebe, Antioch	Northern terminus of US 67B
Arkansas	White		34.6	55.7	35	AR 13 – McRae, Garner	Former AR 371
Arkansas	White	Searcy	41.6	66.9	42	US 67B north / AR 367 south – Searcy, Garner	Southern terminus of US 67B; northern terminus of AR 367
Arkansas	White	Searcy	43.2	69.5	44	AR 367 – Searcy	
Arkansas	White	Searcy	44.6	71.8	45	AR 36 west / AR 367 – Searcy	AR 367 not signed; eastern terminus of AR 36
Arkansas	White	Searcy	45.8	73.7	46	US 67B south / AR 36 east – Searcy, Kensett	Northern terminus of US 67B; western terminus of AR 36
Arkansas	White		47.4	76.3	48	AR 385 – Judsonia	
Arkansas	White		50.5	81.3	51	AR 157 – Judsonia	
Arkansas	White		54.0	86.9	54	Bald Knob Lake Road	
Arkansas	White	Bald Knob	54.9	88.4	55	US 64 east / US 167 north – Bald Knob, Batesville	Northern end of US 64/US 167 concurrency
Arkansas	White		59.5	95.8	60	Russell	Access via SE 3rd Street
Arkansas	White		64.9	104.4	65	AR 87 – Bradford	
Arkansas	Jackson		68.6	110.4	69	CR 315 – Possum Grape	
Arkansas	Jackson				Bridge over White River		
Arkansas	Jackson	Ingleside	73.5	118.3	74	AR 224 east	Western terminus of AR 224
Arkansas	Jackson		80.0	128.7	80	AR 14 / AR 224 west – Waldenburg	AR 224 not signed
Arkansas	Jackson		82.3	132.4	82	AR 17 – Newport	
Arkansas	Jackson	Newport	83.4	134.2	83	AR 384 – Newport	
Arkansas	Jackson	Newport	85.5	137.6	85	AR 18 – Newport, Grubbs	
Arkansas	Jackson		87.8	141.3	87	CR 43	
Arkansas	Jackson		96.3	155.0	95	AR 37 – Tuckerman, Grubbs	
Arkansas	Craighead		102.7	165.3	102	US 78 east / AR 226 – Jonesboro, Cash, Arkansas State University	Western terminus of US 78; former routing of US 67
Arkansas	Lawrence	Alicia	110.1	177.2	111	AR 230 to AR 91 / AR 367 – Alicia, Bono	
Arkansas	Lawrence	Walnut Ridge	120.0	193.1	121	US 63 / US 412 west – Hoxie, Jonesboro	Southern end of US 412 concurrency; signed as exits 121A (north) and 121B (south) southbound; former routing of US 67
Arkansas	Lawrence	Walnut Ridge	122.8	197.6	124	US 67 north / US 412 east / US 412B west – Paragould, Walnut Ridge	Northern end of US 67/US 412 concurrency; current northern terminus; eastern terminus of US 412B; exit number not signed
Arkansas	95.89-mile (154.32 km) gap in I-57, connection made via US 67 and US 60						
Missouri	Stoddard	Richland Township				Route 153 south / Route N north	Existing interchanges of US 60 (conversion to Interstate standards)
Missouri	Stoddard	Richland Township				Route 114	Existing interchanges of US 60 (conversion to Interstate standards)
Missouri	New Madrid	Morehouse				Route E	Existing interchanges of US 60 (conversion to Interstate standards)
Missouri	New Madrid	Sikeston				US 60 Bus. east / Route FF south (Pharris Ridge Drive)	Existing interchanges of US 60 (conversion to Interstate standards)
Missouri	New Madrid	Sikeston				US 60 Bus. west / US 61 / US 62 – Sikeston	Existing interchanges of US 60 (conversion to Interstate standards)
Missouri	Scott	Sikeston	0.000– 0.538	0.000– 0.866	1	I-55 – Memphis, St. Louis	Signed as exits 1A (south) and 1B (north); exit 66 on I-55
Missouri	Mississippi	Long Prairie Township	4.916	7.912	4	Route B – Bertrand	
Missouri	Mississippi	Charleston	10.745	17.292	10	I-57 BL north / Route 105 – Charleston, East Prairie	Southern terminus of I-57 BL
Missouri	Mississippi	Charleston	13.027	20.965	12	I-57 BL south / US 60 east / US 62 / Route 77 – Charleston, Wyatt	Northern end of US 60 concurrency; northern terminus of I-57 BL
Mississippi River			22.328 0.00	35.933 0.00	Interstate 57 Bridge; Missouri–Illinois state line		
Illinois	Alexander	Cairo	1.4	2.3	1	US 51 south / IL 3 – Cairo, Olive Branch	Southern end of US 51 concurrency
Illinois	Pulaski	Mounds	7.6	12.2	8	Mounds Road	
Illinois	Pulaski	Ullin	17.7	28.5	18	Ullin	Access via CR 7
Illinois	Union	Dongola	24.4	39.3	24	Dongola Road	
Illinois	Union	Dongola	25.0	40.2	25	US 51 north – Carbondale	Northern end of US 51 concurrency; northbound exit and southbound entrance
Illinois	Union	Anna	30.0	48.3	30	IL 146 – Anna, Vienna	
Illinois	Union	Buncombe	36.3	58.4	36	Lick Creek Road	
Illinois	Johnson	Goreville	39.7	63.9	40	Goreville Road	
Illinois	Williamson	Southern Precinct	43.9	70.7	44	I-24 east – Nashville	Western terminus of I-24
Illinois	Williamson	Southern Precinct	45.2	72.7	45	IL 148 (Refuge Road)	
Illinois	Williamson	Marion	52.9	85.1	53	Main Street – Marion	Former IL 13
Illinois	Williamson	Marion	53.6	86.3	54	IL 13 / The Hill Avenue – Carbondale, Harrisburg	Signed as exits 54A (IL 13) and 54B (The Hill Avenue) northbound
Illinois	Williamson	Johnston City	58.9	94.8	59	Johnston City, Herrin	Access via CR 1
Illinois	Franklin	West Frankfort	64.6	104.0	65	IL 149 – West Frankfort, Zeigler	
Illinois	Franklin	West City	71.6	115.2	71	IL 14 – Benton, Christopher	To IL 34
Illinois	Franklin	Ewing Township	77.5	124.7	77	IL 154 – Sesser, Whittington	
Illinois	Jefferson	Ina	82.6	132.9	83	Ina	Access via North Avenue
Illinois	Jefferson	Dodds Township	91.5	147.3	92	I-64 east – Louisville	Southern end of I-64 concurrency; exit 78 on I-64
Illinois	Jefferson	Mt. Vernon	93.7	150.8	94	Veterans Memorial Drive	
Illinois	Jefferson	Mt. Vernon	94.7	152.4	95	IL 15 – Mt. Vernon, Ashley	Future diverging diamond interchange (DDI)
Illinois	Jefferson	Mt. Vernon	96.2	154.8	96	I-64 west – St. Louis	Northern end of I-64 concurrency; exit 73 on I-64
Illinois	Jefferson	Dix	103.5	166.6	103	Dix	Access via CR 39
Illinois	Marion	Raccoon Township	109.2	175.7	109	IL 161 – Centralia	
Illinois	Marion	Salem	116.4	187.3	116	US 50 – Salem, Sandoval	
Illinois	Marion	Kinmundy Township	127.2	204.7	127	Patoka, Kinmundy	Access via CR 8
Illinois	Fayette	Farina	135.4	217.9	135	IL 185 – Farina, Vandalia	
Illinois	Clay	No major junctions					
Illinois	Effingham	Mason Township	144.7	232.9	145	Edgewood	Access via CR 29
Illinois	Effingham	Mason Township	150.7	242.5	151	Watson, Mason	Access via IL 37
Illinois	Effingham	Summit Township	157.3	253.1	157	I-70 west – St. Louis	Southern end of I-70 concurrency; exit 92 on I-70
Illinois	Effingham	Effingham	159.4	256.5	159	Fayette Avenue	
Illinois	Effingham	Effingham	160.5	258.3	160	IL 32 / IL 33 – Newton, Beecher City	Access to Lake Shelbyville and Convention Center
Illinois	Effingham	Effingham	162.2	261.0	162	US 45 – Sigel, Effingham	Access to Lake Land College and Kuthe Center
Illinois	Effingham	Teutopolis Township	163.4	263.0	163	I-70 east – Indianapolis	Northern end of I-70 concurrency; exit 98 on I-70
Illinois	Shelby	No major junctions					
Illinois	Cumberland	Neoga Township	177.0	284.9	177	US 45 – Neoga	
Illinois	Coles	Mattoon	184.4	296.8	184	US 45 / IL 121 – Mattoon, Toledo	
Illinois	Coles	Mattoon	189.6	305.1	190	IL 16 – Charleston, Mattoon	Signed as exits 190A (east) and 190B (west); access to Coles County Airport and Eastern Illinois University
Illinois	Coles	Mattoon	192.4	309.6	192	CR 18 (Mattoon-Charleston Enterprise Parkway)	
Illinois	Douglas	Arcola	203.6	327.7	203	IL 133 – Paris, Arcola	
Illinois	Douglas	Tuscola	211.7	340.7	212	US 36 – Newman, Tuscola	
Illinois	Champaign	Pesotum	219.9	353.9	220	US 45 – Tolono, Pesotum	
Illinois	Champaign	Tolono Township	228.6	367.9	229	Monticello, Savoy, Tolono	Access via CR 18; access to Willard Airport
Illinois	Champaign	Champaign Township	231.7	372.9	232	Curtis Road	
Illinois	Champaign	Champaign	235.2	378.5	235	I-72 to University Avenue – Springfield, Decatur	Signed as exits 235A (east) and 235B (west); I-72 east not signed; exit 182 on I-72
Illinois	Champaign	Champaign	237.4	382.1	237	I-74 – Indianapolis, Peoria	Signed as exits 237A (east) and 237B (west); exit 179 on I-74
Illinois	Champaign	Champaign	238.4	383.7	238	Olympian Drive	
Illinois	Champaign	Hensley Township	240.5	387.0	240	Market Street	
Illinois	Champaign	Rantoul	250.2	402.7	250	US 136 – Rantoul, Fisher	
Illinois	Ford	Paxton	260.9	419.9	261	IL 9 – Paxton, Gibson City	
Illinois	Iroquois	Artesia Township	271.9	437.6	272	Buckley, Roberts	Access via CR 9; Roberts not signed southbound
Illinois	Iroquois	Onarga Township	279.9	450.5	280	IL 54 – Onarga, Roberts	Roberts not signed northbound
Illinois	Iroquois	Gilman	282.9	455.3	283	US 24 – Gilman, Chatsworth	
Illinois	Iroquois	Ashkum Township	292.7	471.1	293	IL 116 – Ashkum, Pontiac	
Illinois	Iroquois	Clifton	296.5	477.2	297	Clifton	Access via CR 4
Illinois	Iroquois	Chebanse Township	301.6	485.4	302	Chebanse	Access via CR 37
Illinois	Kankakee	Kankakee	307.5	494.9	308	US 45 / US 52 – Kankakee	
Illinois	Kankakee	Kankakee	311.6	501.5	312	IL 17 – Kankakee, Momence	
Illinois	Kankakee	Kankakee	315.3	507.4	315	IL 50 – Bradley, Bourbonnais	
Illinois	Kankakee	Bourbonnais	318.4	512.4	318	Bourbonnais Parkway	Opened November 2, 2018
Illinois	Kankakee	Manteno	321.6	517.6	322	Manteno	Access via CR 9
Illinois	Will	Peotone Township	327.1	526.4	327	Wilmington, Peotone	Access via CR 25
Illinois	Will	Monee	335.1	539.3	335	Manhattan, Monee	Access via CR 6
Illinois	Will	University Park	337.1	542.5	337	Stuenkel Road / University Parkway	Access to Governors State University; interchange opened on October 30, 2015
Illinois	Cook	Richton Park	339.0	545.6	339	Sauk Trail	
Illinois	Cook	Matteson	340.69	548.29	340	US 30 / Lincoln Highway – Matteson	Signed as exits 340A (east) and 340B (west) southbound
Illinois	Cook	Matteson	342.21	550.73	342	Vollmer Road	Signed as exits 342A (east) and 342B (west) southbound
Illinois	Cook	Country Club Hills	344.67– 344.86	554.69– 555.00	345	I-80 to I-294 Toll – Indiana, Iowa	Signed as exits 345A (east) and 345B (west); exit 151 on I-80
Illinois	Cook	Country Club Hills	346.62	557.83	346	167th Street to IL 50 (Cicero Avenue)	Signed as exits 346A (east) and 346B (west)
Illinois	Cook	Markham	347.90	559.89	348	US 6 (159th Street) – Markham, Oak Forest	Signed as exits 348A (east) and 348B (west)
Illinois	Cook	Markham	349.62	562.66	349	I-294 Toll (Tri-State Tollway) – Wisconsin, Indiana	Signed as exits 349A (north) and 349 (south) southbound; no northbound exit to I-294 south; no southbound entrance from I-294 north; exit 7 on I-294
Illinois	Cook	Posen	350.15	563.51	350	IL 83 (147th Street / Sibley Boulevard)	
Illinois	Cook	Calumet Park	353.25	568.50	353	127th Street, Burr Oak Avenue	
Illinois	Cook	Calumet Park–Chicago line	354.25	570.11	354	119th Street	
Illinois	Cook	Chicago	355.27	571.75	355	111th Street, Monterey Avenue	
Illinois	Cook	Chicago	357.32	575.05	357	IL 1 south (Halsted Street)	Northern terminus of IL 1
Illinois	Cook	Chicago	358.47	576.90	—	I-94 east (Bishop Ford Freeway) – Indiana	Northbound exit and southbound entrance; exit 63 on I-94
Illinois	Cook	Chicago	358.57	577.06	358	Wentworth Avenue	Southbound exit only
Illinois	Cook	Chicago	359.12	577.95		I-94 west (Dan Ryan Expressway) – Chicago Loop	Northern terminus
1.000 mi = 1.609 km; 1.000 km = 0.621 mi: Concurrency terminus; Electronic toll collection; Incomplete access; Unopened

== Related routes ==
=== Arkansas Highway 657 ===
Highway 657
- Future Interstate 57
- Location: Bypass around Corning, AR
- Length: 4.1 mi (6.6 km)

Arkansas Highway 657 is a proposed state highway and a bypass around the city of Corning in Clay County, Arkansas. Construction on AR 657 started in 2025, with completion set for late 2027. Ground was broken on November 14, 2024. It will be a four lane highway built to interstate standards.

The entire route is in Clay County.

Location	mi	km	Destinations	Notes
Corning	0.0	0.0	US 62 / US 67	Southern terminus
Corning	4.1	6.6	US 67	Northern terminus
1.000 mi = 1.609 km; 1.000 km = 0.621 mi

=== Charleston business loop ===
Interstate 57 Business
- Location: Charleston, MO
- Length: 2.94 mi (4.73 km)

Interstate 57 Business (I-57 Bus.) in Charleston, begins at I-57 exit 10. From this diamond interchange, it runs north concurrently with Route 105 along South Main Street into the city center. It then turns east onto Marshall Street, which also carries US 62 and Route 77. The business route ends at I-57 exit 12. US 62 and Route 77 continue to the east with US 60.
