= Mackey Arena =

Athletic arena at Purdue University

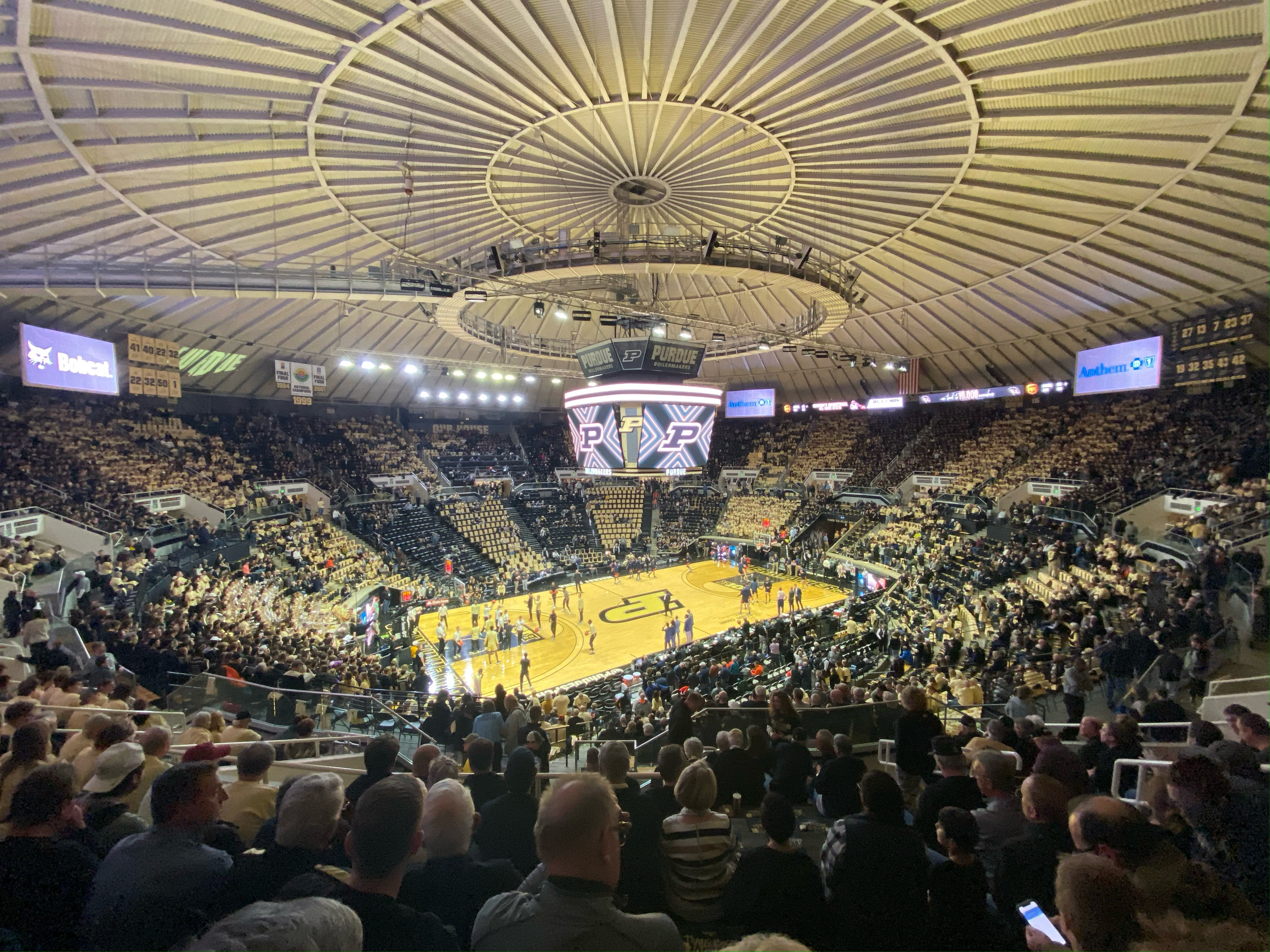
- Interactive map of Mackey Arena
- Former names: Purdue Arena (1967–72)
- Location: 900 John R. Wooden Drive; West Lafayette, IN 47907
- Coordinates: 40°25′59.96″N 86°54′58.12″W
- Owner: Purdue University
- Operator: Purdue University
- Capacity: 14,123 (1967–2011); 14,240 (2011–2012); 14,846 (2012–2016); 14,804 (2016–2022); 14,876 (2022–present)
- Surface: Hardwood

Construction
- Groundbreaking: July 1965
- Opened: December 2, 1967
- Renovated: 2007–2012
- Cost: $6 million (1967) ($57.9 million in 2025 dollars) $99.5 Million (2007–2011 renovation)
- Architects: Walter Scholer and Associates Inc. (original); HNTB (2007–2011 renovation)
- General contractor: S.N. Nielsen Co.

Tenants
- Purdue Boilermakers (men's basketball) (women's basketball)

Mackey Arena is located in West Lafayette, Indiana. Part of the Purdue University campus, it is home to the university's basketball teams, and occasionally hosts home games for the volleyball and wrestling teams. The arena opened in 1967 as a replacement home for Purdue's basketball teams for Lambert Fieldhouse, which still exists but used for other sports.

== History ==
Originally named Purdue Arena, it was renamed on March 3, 1971, to honor Purdue alumnus and longtime athletic director Guy "Red" Mackey. On December 12, 1997, the floor was renamed Keady Court in honor of longtime men's coach Gene Keady. The circular arena, similar to several built in the 1960s, seats 14,876, and is considered by many as one of the loudest arenas in the nation due to its domed aluminum roof.

=== Renovations ===
In recent years, Mackey Arena has experienced numerous upgrades and improvements, including:

- 1997 – New playing surface and basketball hoops installed
- 1998 – Roof repainted
- 2000 – New bleachers installed
- 2002 – Women's basketball locker room renovated
- 2002 – Men's basketball locker room renovated
- 2003 – Video and meeting room for women's basketball constructed
- 2003 – Team championship and Consensus All-American jersey banners hung
- 2003 – Men's basketball player lounge renovated
- 2003 – Lower press row reconstructed
- 2003 – Press conference and media work room renovated
- 2004 – Video board installed
- 2004 – Sound system installed
- 2005 – Playing surface refinished
- 2007–2012 – Mackey Complex Project
- 2011 – New playing surface installed after water damage
- 2016 – Playing surface replaced after a flood due to a broken water main
- 2017 – Center video board and stat boards replaced and upgraded, new LED ribbons installed above both baselines

=== NCAA Tournament ===
Mackey Arena hosted first and second-round games of the 1980 NCAA tournament. The arena also hosted the First Four and first-round games of the 2021 tournament.

== Mackey Arena Complex Project ==
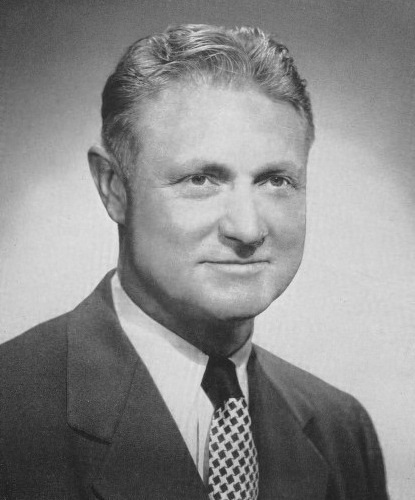
Guy Mackey c. 1963

On May 18, 2007, the university's board of trustees voted to award a contract to HNTB Architecture of Kansas City, Mo., for a $99.5 million project that extends from the outer edges of the arena north along Northwestern Avenue to Cherry Lane. A three-level structure is planned north of Mackey and currently is being referred to as the Student-Athlete Development Center. Its highlights include:

- A sports medicine facility approximately three and a half to four times larger than the current area in Mackey.
- A strength and weight training facility approximately four times larger than the existing Intercollegiate Athletic Facility weight room.
- An oversized basketball practice facility, including Danielle and Brian Cardinal Court and three breakout shooting areas.
- The Drew and Britney Brees Student Athlete Academic Center, towards which the couple donated $2 million in the fall of 2007.
- New playing surface for Keady Court
- Reseating of the Paint Crew for the 2011–2012 season
- Proposed visitors tunnel be cut into the southeast lower bowl seating area
- Interactive fan elements and coaching technologies in concourse

The concourse width will be approximately doubled, concessions will increase four times (from 12 to 48 points of sale) and restrooms will increase three times for women and by 35% for men. In addition, the lower seating sections on the east side will be modified to allow for some premium seats, with club seats (fixed padded stadium chairs) and loge seats (office-style chairs on casters) provided. A limited number of premium courtside seats will be available in the west pit area. Accessible seating will increase approximately six times. Two club spaces will be created, one for general fans on the west side and a premium club to the east.

== See also ==
- List of NCAA Division I basketball arenas
