= Hensley Township =

Hensley Township may refer to the following townships in the United States:

- Hensley Township, Champaign County, Illinois
- Hensley Township, Johnson County, Indiana
