= Dongola, Illinois =

Dongola
- Village
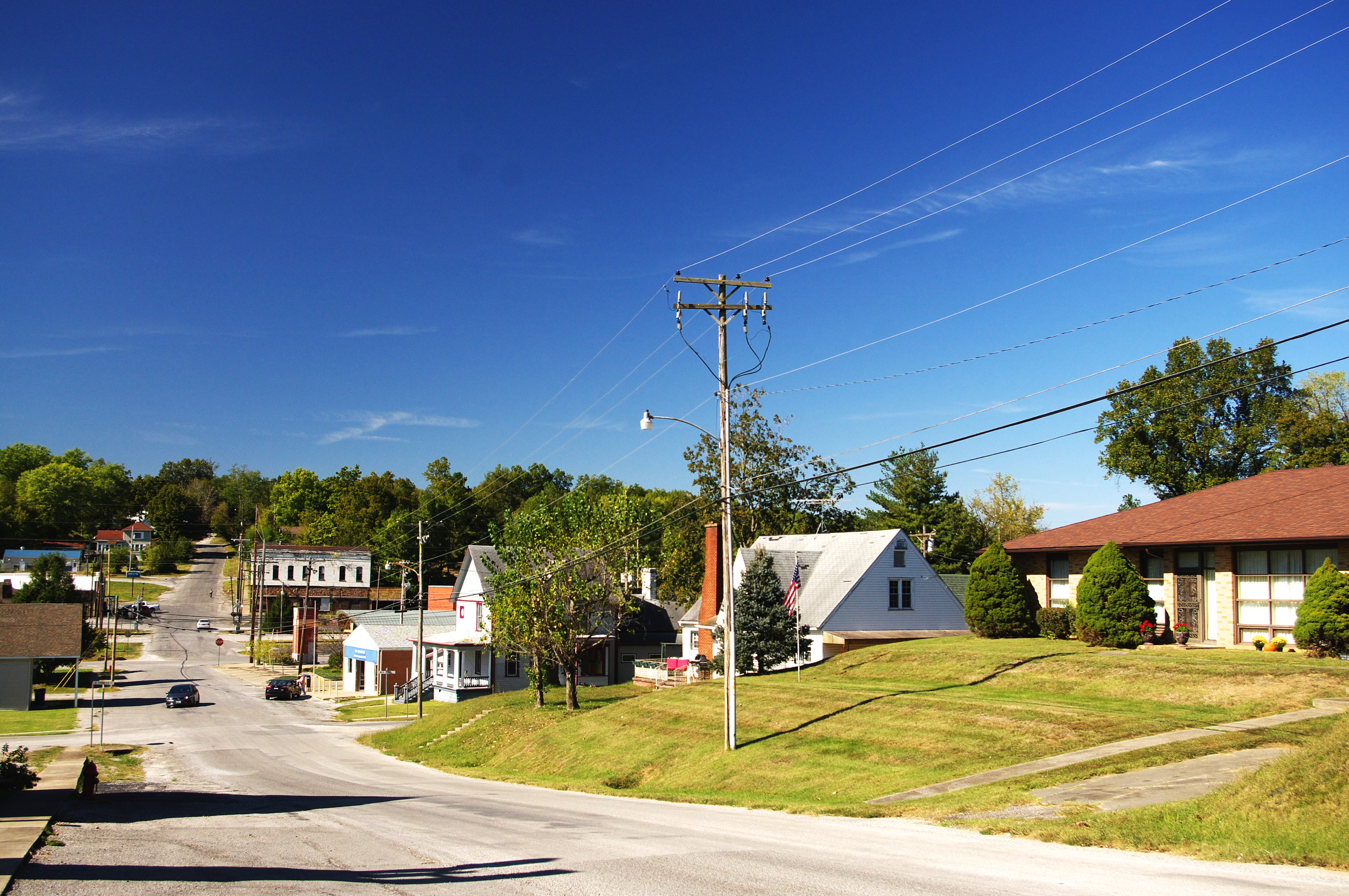
- Dongola

- Location of Dongola in Union County, Illinois.

- Location of Illinois in the United States
- Coordinates: 37°21′40″N 89°9′52″W
- Country: United States
- State: Illinois
- County: Union

Area
  - Total: 1.15 sq mi (2.97 km^{2})
  - Land: 1.09 sq mi (2.82 km^{2})
  - Water: 0.058 sq mi (0.15 km^{2})
- Elevation: 397 ft (121 m)

Population (2020)
  - Total: 661
  - Density: 607.3/sq mi (234.49/km^{2})
- Time zone: UTC-6 (CST)
  - Summer (DST): UTC-5 (CDT)
- ZIP Code(s): 62926
- Area code: 618
- FIPS code: 17-20305
- GNIS ID: 2398735
- Wikimedia Commons: Dongola, Illinois

Dongola (/dɒnˈɡoʊlə/) is a village in Union County, Illinois, United States. The population was 661 at the 2020 census.

== History ==
Dongola was laid out in 1857 as a stop along the Illinois Central Railroad. A post office known as "Unionville" had been established in 1855, but the name was changed to "Dongola," after Dongola, Sudan.

== Geography ==
Dongola is located at 37°21′40″N 89°9′52″W (37.361243, -89.164574). The village is situated north of Cairo at the intersection of Old U.S. Highway 51 (signed as Front Street in Dongola) and Interstate 57. The point at which Union, Pulaski, and Alexander counties meet is located just to the southwest. Dongola Lake, created by a small dam along Little Creek, lies to the west of Dongola.

According to the 2010 census, Dongola has a total area of 1.147 square miles (2.97 km^{2}), of which 1.09 square miles (2.82 km^{2}) (or 95.03%) is land and 0.057 square miles (0.15 km^{2}) (or 4.97%) is water.

== Demographics ==
Historical population
Census	Pop.	Note	%±
1880	599		—
1890	733		22.4%
1900	681		−7.1%
1910	702		3.1%
1920	660		−6.0%
1930	635		−3.8%
1940	638		0.5%
1950	704		10.3%
1960	757		7.5%
1970	825		9.0%
1980	886		7.4%
1990	728		−17.8%
2000	806		10.7%
2010	726		−9.9%
2020	661		−9.0%
U.S. Decennial Census

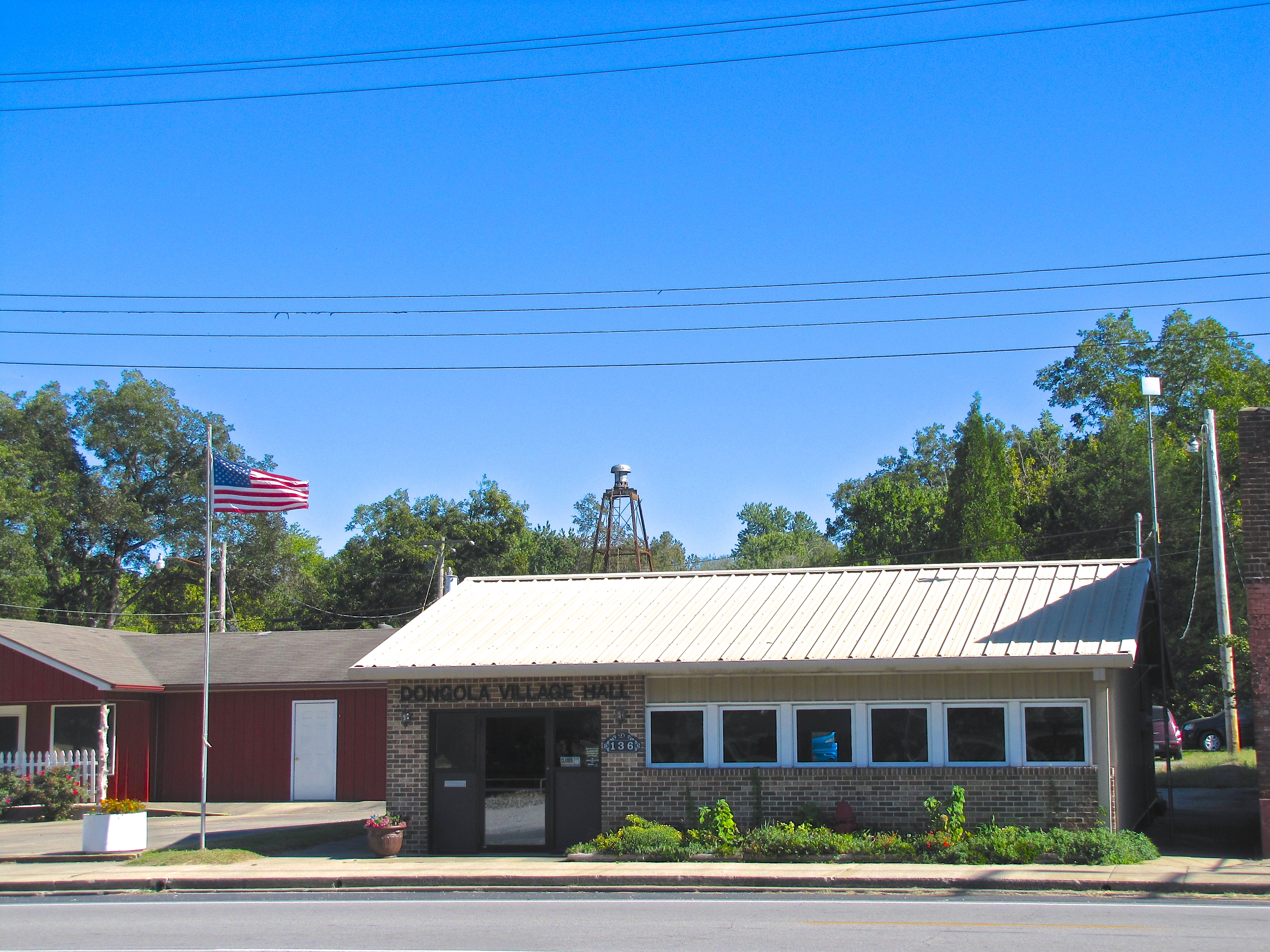
Dongola Village Hall

As of the census of 2000, there were 806 people, 330 households, and 222 families residing in the village. The population density was 728.8 inhabitants per square mile (281.4/km^{2}). There were 354 housing units at an average density of 320.1 per square mile (123.6/km^{2}). The racial makeup of the village was 95.78% White, 0.12% African American, 0.87% Native American, 0.37% Asian, 0.12% from other races, and 2.73% from two or more races. Hispanic or Latino of any race were 0.12% of the population.

There were 330 households, out of which 33.0% had children under the age of 18 living with them, 48.5% were married couples living together, 15.8% had a female householder with no husband present, and 32.7% were non-families. 30.6% of all households were made up of individuals, and 13.9% had someone living alone who was 65 years of age or older. The average household size was 2.39 and the average family size was 2.96.

In the village, the population was spread out, with 27.5% under the age of 18, 8.2% from 18 to 24, 27.8% from 25 to 44, 19.9% from 45 to 64, and 16.6% who were 65 years of age or older. The median age was 35 years. For every 100 females, there were 87.9 males. For every 100 females age 18 and over, there were 81.4 males.

The median income for a household in the village was $24,539, and the median income for a family was $32,115. Males had a median income of $30,234 versus $18,864 for females. The per capita income for the village was $11,917. About 15.2% of families and 21.5% of the population were below the poverty line, including 29.1% of those under age 18 and 9.1% of those age 65 or over.
