= Monical's Pizza =

American pizza chain

Monical Pizza Corporation
- Company type: Private
- Industry: Food
- Founded: 1959; 67 years ago
- Headquarters: Bradley, Illinois, US
- Key people: Janelle Reents, President
- Products: Pizza
- Website: www.monicals.com

Monical's Pizza is an American regional pizza chain with locations in Illinois, Indiana, Missouri and Wisconsin. About half of the restaurants are franchised and the rest are company owned. The chain began in 1959, when the Monical family opened a pizza restaurant in Tolono, Illinois, and its corporate office is in Bradley, Illinois.

== History ==
Monical's Pizza began in 1959, when the Monical family opened a thin-crust pizza restaurant in a converted pool hall in Tolono, Illinois. The company later expanded beyond its original location in central Illinois.

Monical Pizza Corporation was incorporated in Illinois in 1982 to operate and franchise Monical's Pizza restaurants, with the corporate office in Bradley, Illinois. By 2025, the company reported 58 restaurants in four Midwestern states, comprising 32 company-owned locations and 26 franchises.

Founder Ralph Monical later sold the Monical's franchise and opened other central Illinois restaurants, including Zelma's in Champaign and Roma Ralph's in Le Roy. He died in 2022.

== Products ==
The chain is known for its thin-crust pizza and a red "Sweet & Tart" salad dressing (often referred to as French dressing), which is served as a dipping sauce for pizza and sold by the bottle in retail stores.

== See also ==
- List of pizza chains of the United States
