= Cairo I-57 Bridge =

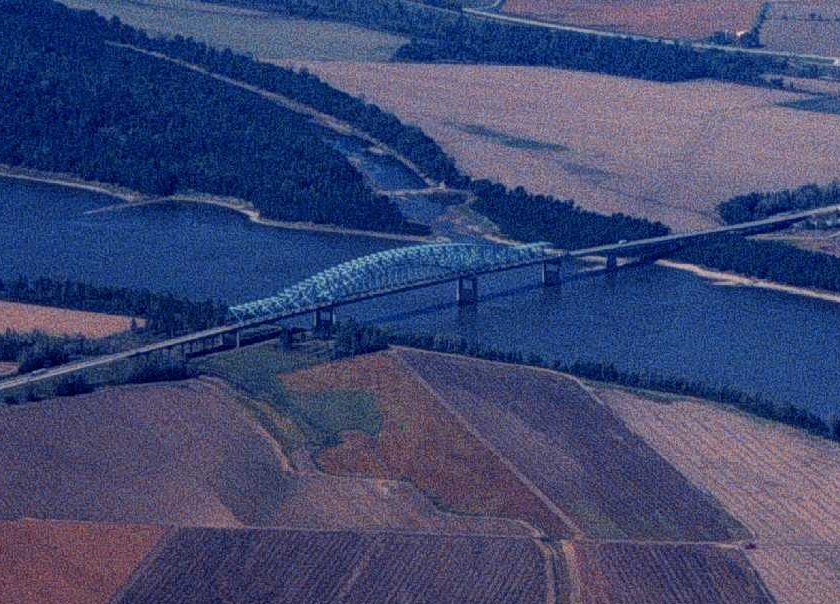
- Coordinates: 37°01′23″N 89°12′42″W
- Carries: 4 lanes of I-57
- Crosses: Mississippi River
- Locale: Charleston, Missouri and Cairo, Illinois
- Maintained by: Illinois Department of Transportation

Characteristics
- Design: Through arch bridge
- Total length: 4,089 feet (1,246 m)
- Width: 59 feet (18 m)
- Longest span: 821 feet (250 m)
- Clearance below: 107 feet (33 m)

History
- Opened: 1978

Statistics
- Daily traffic: 12,200 AADT

Location
- Interactive map of Cairo I-57 Bridge

The Cairo I-57 Bridge is a steel through arch bridge carrying four lanes of Interstate 57 across the Mississippi River at Cairo, Illinois. It was opened in 1978.

== See also ==
- List of crossings of the Upper Mississippi River
