= Rocky Ryan (American football) =

American football player (1932–2011)

No. 45
- Positions: Defensive back, end

Personal information
- Born: July 5, 1932; Tolono, Illinois, U.S.
- Died: November 3, 2011; Urbana, Illinois, U.S.
- Listed height: 6 ft 1 in (1.85 m)
- Listed weight: 202 lb (92 kg)

Career information
- High school: Unity (Tolono)
- College: Illinois (1950–1953)
- NFL draft: 1954: 2nd round, 21st overall pick

Career history
- Philadelphia Eagles (1956–1958); Chicago Bears (1958)

Awards and highlights
- Second-team All-Big Ten (1953)

Career NFL statistics
- Receptions: 6
- Receiving yards: 188
- Touchdowns: 2
- Stats at Pro Football Reference

John "Rocky" Ryan (July 5, 1932 – November 3, 2011) was an American professional football player who was a defensive back in the National Football League (NFL) in the late 1950s. Ryan played college football for the University of Illinois at Urbana-Champaign. He was selected in the second round of the 1954 NFL draft, and played professionally for the Philadelphia Eagles and Chicago Bears of the NFL.

== Early life ==
Ryan was born in Tolono, Illinois. He attended Unity High School in Tolono, Illinois from 1946 to 1950 and played both football and basketball. In addition, he won the Illinois State Pole Vault Title during the 1947–1948 school year. Ryan's pole vault championship assisted the high school track and field team in finishing tenth overall at the state meet.

== College career ==
After graduating from high school, Ryan attended the University of Illinois at Urbana-Champaign, where he joined the football team. His style of play lead to him being referred to as a "daring young Irishman". Perhaps the highlight of his collegiate football career was playing in the 1952 Rose Bowl, the first nationally televised college football game, where he caught a touchdown pass. Ryan's touchdown was Illinois' final score of the game and was part of a dominant Rose Bowl performance by the team that the University of Illinois Alumni Association would go on to name one of the top ten moments in Illini football history.

In addition to his performance on the field, Ryan became known for one significant off-field incident during his collegiate career, referred to as "The Apple Bowl." After the University of Illinois defeated the University of Iowa 33–13 in a game held on November 8, 1952, Iowa fans began to throw apples and other fruit at Illinois players as the players exited the field. Shortly thereafter, Ryan was approached by a University of Iowa fan named Richard Wolfe, and, after an exchange between the two men, Ryan punched Wolfe in the face, breaking his jaw. The incident resulted in the two schools not playing a football game against each other for fifteen years.

== Professional career ==
In 1954, he was selected 21st overall in the second round of the 1954 NFL draft by the Philadelphia Eagles. However, his entry into the NFL was delayed as he enlisted in the United States Army and served from 1954 to 1956. Ryan ultimately played for the Eagles during the 1956 and 1957 seasons but, partway through the 1958 season, left the team for the Chicago Bears. It was rumored for a period of time that Ryan was originally placed on waivers by the Eagles for a situation in which his temper "flared up" in an exchange with coach Buck Shaw. The 1958 season would be his last with the NFL, at which point he returned to Champaign, Illinois and worked a variety of jobs prior to his retirement.
