= Unity High School (Tolono, Illinois) =

Location
- 1127 County Rd 800; Tolono, Illinois 61880; United States; 39.9942°N 88.2493°W

Information
- Type: Public, Secondary
- Motto: Aim For Excellence
- School district: CUSD 7
- Principal: Bill Behrends
- Grades: 9–12
- Enrollment: 526 (2023-2024)
- Colors: Maroon, gray, and white
- Mascot: Rocket
- Rival: St. Joseph-Ogden High School
- Website: http://www.unityrockets.com

Unity High School is a public high school located in the village of Tolono in Champaign County, Illinois, United States. In 2007, 467 students attended the grades 9-12 school. It is the only high school in Community Unit School District (CUSD) Seven. Unity Junior High School, Unity West Elementary, and Unity East Elementary feed into UHS. The school serves the towns and villages of Tolono, Philo, Sidney, Sadorus, and Pesotum, as well as 173 square miles (450 km^{2}) of rural farmland. Located 10 miles (16 km) south of the Champaign-Urbana urban area, the school is over 95% Caucasian, as is typical for the rural region.

Unity is a member of the Illini Prairie Conference, an athletic conference made up of central Illinois schools with similar enrollments. Unity had been a charter member of the Okaw Valley Conference from 1958 to 1984, before rejoining the conference in 2006.

== Notable alumni ==
- Brian Cardinal, NBA basketball player with the Dallas Mavericks.
- Rocky Ryan (American football), NFL football player with the Philadelphia Eagles and the Chicago Bears.
