= Tolono Township, Champaign County, Illinois =

Tolono Township
- Township
- Location in Champaign County

- Champaign County's location in Illinois
- Coordinates: 40°01′04″N 88°17′55″W
- Country: United States
- State: Illinois
- County: Champaign
- Established: November 8, 1859

Area
  - Total: 35.69 sq mi (92.4 km^{2})
  - Land: 35.63 sq mi (92.3 km^{2})
  - Water: 0.06 sq mi (0.16 km^{2}) 0.16%
- Elevation: 715 ft (218 m)

Population (2020)
  - Total: 6,298
  - Density: 176.8/sq mi (68.25/km^{2})
- Time zone: UTC-6 (CST)
  - Summer (DST): UTC-5 (CDT)
- FIPS code: 17-019-75627

Tolono Township is a township in Champaign County, Illinois, USA. As of the 2020 census, its population was 6,298 and it contained 2,723 housing units.

== Geography ==
Tolono is Township 18 North, Range 8 East of the Third Principal Meridian.

According to the 2021 census gazetteer files, Tolono Township has a total area of 35.69 square miles (92.44 km^{2}), of which 35.63 square miles (92.28 km^{2}) (or 99.84%) is land and 0.06 square miles (0.16 km^{2}) (or 0.16%) is water.

=== Cities and towns ===
- Savoy (southwest quarter)
- Tolono

=== Cemeteries ===
The township contains these cemeteries: Bailey Memorial, Barnett, Beckman, Prairieview (Section 3), and Saint Patrick.

Historic Ash Grove Cemetery is in Section 26.

=== Churches ===
Prairieview Church (Section 3) formerly adjacent to Prairieview Cemetery is no longer standing. Located at the southeast corner of the intersection of county roads 900E and 1200N it was probably the namesake of Old Church Road (CR 1200N) in Savoy.

=== Grain elevators ===
Tolono elevator (Section 26) was built along the Wabash—Norfolk Southern railroad. Operated by Tolono Mill and Elevator in 1913; V.L. Horton in 1929; Grand Prairie Coop Inc. in 2000; Premier Coop in 2021.

=== Major highways ===
- Interstate 57
- U.S. Route 45

=== Airports and landing strips ===
- University of Illinois Willard Airport

== Demographics ==
As of the 2020 census there were 6,298 people, 2,034 households, and 1,324 families residing in the township. The population density was 176.49 inhabitants per square mile (68.14/km^{2}). There were 2,723 housing units at an average density of 76.31 per square mile (29.46/km^{2}). The racial makeup of the township was 84.36% White, 3.19% African American, 0.35% Native American, 4.49% Asian, 0.03% Pacific Islander, 1.40% from other races, and 6.18% from two or more races. Hispanic or Latino of any race were 3.27% of the population.

There were 2,034 households, out of which 31.10% had children under the age of 18 living with them, 44.30% were married couples living together, 13.82% had a female householder with no spouse present, and 34.91% were non-families. 26.10% of all households were made up of individuals, and 7.40% had someone living alone who was 65 years of age or older. The average household size was 2.66 and the average family size was 3.27.

The township's age distribution consisted of 20.0% under the age of 18, 19.2% from 18 to 24, 27.2% from 25 to 44, 24% from 45 to 64, and 9.6% who were 65 years of age or older. The median age was 36.5 years. For every 100 females, there were 78.1 males. For every 100 females age 18 and over, there were 76.6 males.

The median income for a household in the township was $70,381, and the median income for a family was $98,103. Males had a median income of $58,644 versus $30,437 for females. The per capita income for the township was $31,846. About 10.6% of families and 13.9% of the population were below the poverty line, including 15.1% of those under age 18 and 12.1% of those age 65 or over.

Historical population
Census	Pop.	Note	%±
2010	5,270		—
2020	6,298		19.5%
U.S. Decennial Census
