= University of Illinois Willard Airport =

Airport in Champaign County, Illinois, U.S.

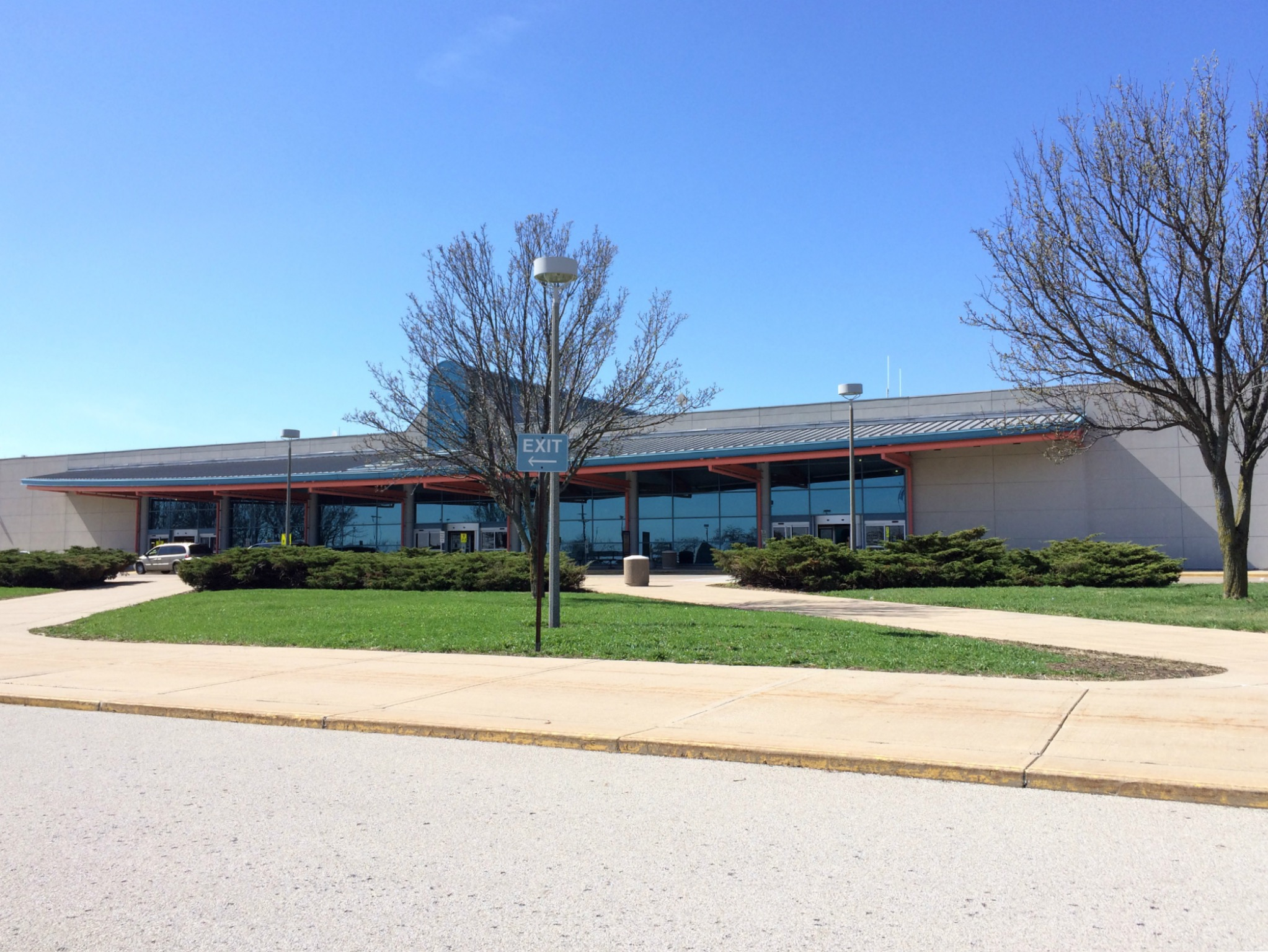
- IATA: CMI; ICAO: KCMI; FAA LID: CMI

Summary
- Airport type: Public
- Operator: University of Illinois Urbana-Champaign
- Serves: Champaign–Urbana metropolitan area
- Location: Tolono Township, Illinois, U.S.
- Elevation AMSL: 754 ft (230 m)
- Coordinates: 40°02′21″N 88°16′41″W
- Website: iflycu.com

Maps
- FAA airport diagram
- Interactive map of University of Illinois; Willard Airport

Runways
Direction	Length		Surface
Direction	ft	m	Surface
4/22	6,501	1,981	Concrete
14L/32R	8,102	2,469	Concrete
14R/32L	3,817	1,163	Asphalt
- Source: Federal Aviation Administration

University of Illinois Willard Airport (IATA: CMI, ICAO: KCMI, FAA LID: CMI), also known as Willard Airport and Champaign–Urbana Airport, is an airport south of Savoy in Tolono Township, Champaign County, Illinois, United States. It is owned and operated by the University of Illinois Urbana–Champaign and is named for former University of Illinois president Arthur Cutts Willard.

== History ==
The airport was dedicated on 26 October 1945. Airline flights began in 1954. The terminal building built in 1960 was used until the present terminal was completed in 1987. By 1969, Willard was the second-busiest airport in the state of Illinois. After the Airline Deregulation Act of 1978, many airlines found service to small airports to be inefficient. As the price differential to airfares from major hub airports such as Chicago O'Hare grew, demand for tickets from Willard fell and caused airlines to leave.

Until 2014, the airport was home to the University of Illinois Institute of Aviation, a research and pilot training facility. The university trustees voted to shutter the institute in 2011 while allowing enrolled students to complete their studies. In 2013, the university agreed to transfer the pilot training function of the institute to Parkland College, a local community college. The university continues to operate the airport and provides an annual subsidy of $433,000 for its operations.

Traffic at Willard airport declined significantly from 2005 to 2013. According to FAA published data, in CY2013 there were 84,853 passenger enplanements compared to 132,077 in 2005. Overall traffic also declined to 54,653 total Combined TRACON / Tower operations in CY 2013 compared to 123,341 in CY2005.

The airport gained some notoriety for a January 21, 1998, incident in which Air Force One became stuck in mud, requiring a backup aircraft to transport President Bill Clinton from a speaking engagement at the University of Illinois' Assembly Hall. The pilot opted to enter the main taxiway from the ramp using a feeder taxiway with an unusually large angle. Due to the wide turn, the right main gear left the taxiway and slipped into the soft turf, causing the aircraft to be lodged in the mud. The Air Force dispatched backup aircraft SAM26000, which first entered service during the Kennedy Administration and would be retired later in 1998.

In January 2023, the airport announced that larger planes will service Dallas–Fort Worth and that expanded service will be offered to Chicago O'Hare. Also, the Institute of Aviation announced an expanded pilot training program.

The airport also announced plans to expand the passenger terminal and TSA facilities as well as to upgrade the taxiway design to remain aligned with FAA standards. In addition, plans for new firefighting facilities are in the works, especially featuring the airport's first new fire truck in 19 years.

== Facilities and aircraft ==
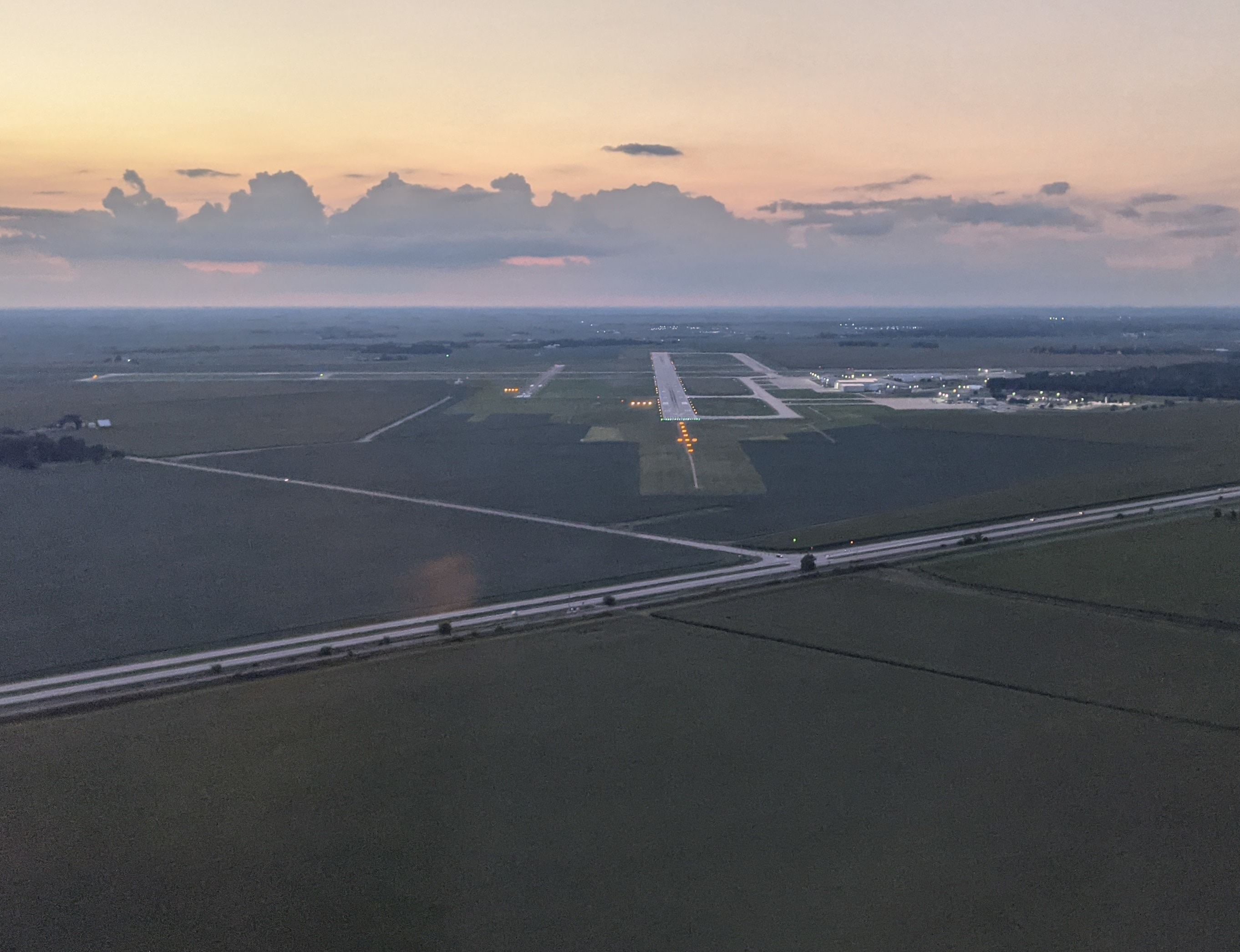
Aerial view of the airport.

Willard Airport covers 1,799 acres (728 ha) and has three runways:

- Runway 4/22: 6,502 by 150 ft (1,982 by 46 m), Grooved asphalt
- Runway 14L/32R: 8,101 by 150 ft (2,469 by 46 m), Grooved asphalt-concrete with ILS
- Runway 14R/32L: 3,816 by 75 ft (1,163 by 23 m), Asphalt

The terminal has five gates.

For the 12-month period ending December 31, 2021, the airport averaged 127 aircraft operations per day, or roughly 46,000 per year. This includes 70% general aviation, 28% air taxi, <1% military, and <1% commercial. For the same time period, there were 75 aircraft based on the field: 56 single-engine and 4 multi-engine airplanes, 12 jets, and 3 helicopters.

== Airline and destinations ==
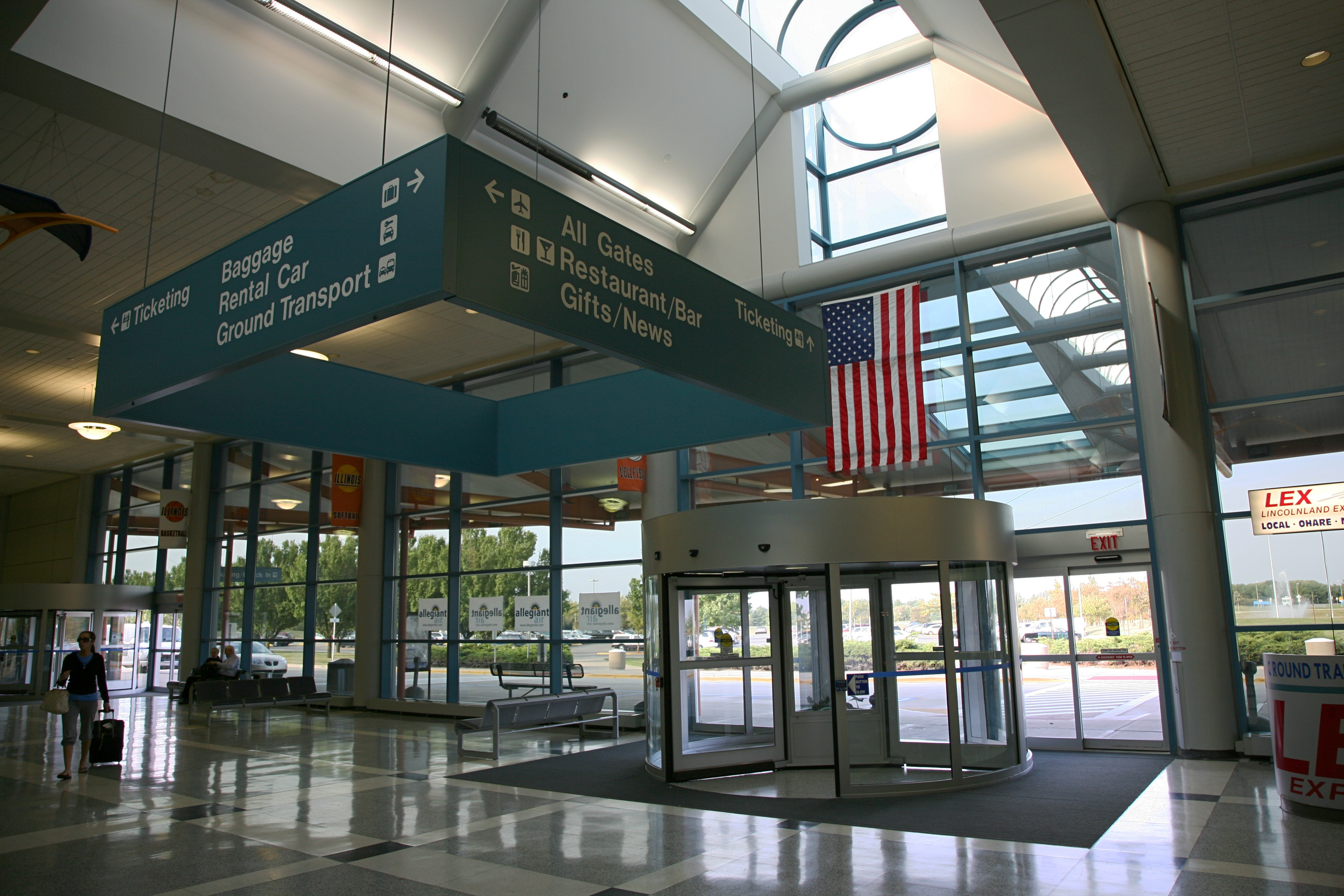
Terminal building at Willard Airport

Airlines	Destinations
American Eagle	Chicago–O'Hare, Dallas/Fort Worth

American Eagle has two daily flights to Dallas Fort Worth International Airport on 75-seat ERJs and two daily ERJ flights to Chicago's O'Hare International Airport on ERJ-170s. Those aircraft come in a dual cabin configuration offering First-Class and Economy.

Delta Air Lines dropped Willard Airport on August 31, 2010. Vision Airlines also ceased service to Willard Airport on January 6, 2012, after three weeks of service. United Airlines as well ceased service to Willard Airport on September 5, 2018, after a year of service. In January 2026, United announced plans to return to the airport in April of that year with flights to and from O'Hare.

The airport saw a 72% decrease in arrival and departure passengers during the first year of the COVID-19 pandemic. That loss cost the airport roughly $500,000. Demand had recovered by 2022, and the airport began seeking ways to attract additional flights to Washington, DC.

The airport is in the process of bringing in routes to leisure destinations, such as Las Vegas, Florida, and Arizona. This requires raising money to support a minimum revenue guarantee for prospective airlines operating these routes. As of December 2024, the airport has raised $850,000 of the $1 million they hope to raise.

== Statistics ==
=== Top destinations ===
Busiest domestic routes from CMI (March 2025 – February 2026)
Rank	Airport	Passengers	Carriers
1	Chicago–O'Hare, Illinois	41,850	American
2	Dallas/Fort Worth, Texas	41,720	American

== Ground transportation ==
As of 2023, there is no public transit service to the airport. The Champaign–Urbana Mass Transit District provides service approximately one mile to the northeast in Savoy.

Four car rental agencies have offices in the terminal building. The airport is reached from U.S. Route 45, five miles south of downtown Champaign. The nearest expressway exit is Exit 229 (Monticello Road) on Interstate 57, about a four-mile drive from the terminal. Parking facilities include a paid parking lot, rental car parking lot, and curbside loading zone.

== Economic impact ==
In 2016, the Champaign County Economic Development Corporation commissioned an Economic Impact Report with support from community sponsors. The report found that the airport had a total of $74,325,994 annual economic impact and a $204,000 daily impact within Champaign County. The 23,266 visitors coming to the area each year because of the airport helped created 112.8 jobs locally. Further, the airport was found to generate $10.2 million in annual tax receipts and $2.3 million in annual local taxes. More than $800,000 of these tax dollars go to local schools.

== Accidents and incidents ==
- On September 9, 1978, a Piper PA-31-310 Navajo crashed near CMI. The aircraft encountered an engine failure, and the pilot in command was unable to maintain the minimum safe flying speed. The plane stalled and ultimately spun, killing all six on board. The family on board was related to a football player at Northwestern University and were departing after the team's game against the University of Illinois.
- On November 12, 1994, a Cessna 210 Centurion crashed soon after a 7 p.m. take-off in inclement weather. The crash killed the pilot and 3 passengers.
- On May 17, 1997, a Piper PA-38-112 Tomahawk crashed after performing a touch and go landing. The pilot was the only occupant of the plane and was killed.
- On January 18, 2017, a Robinson R22 crashed while operating at CMI. The aircraft was attempting two auto rotations at the time when the helicopter skidded across the runway and flipped over. The student and instructor on board were not injured.

== See also ==
- List of airports in Illinois
- Illinois Terminal
