= Philo, Illinois =

- Village
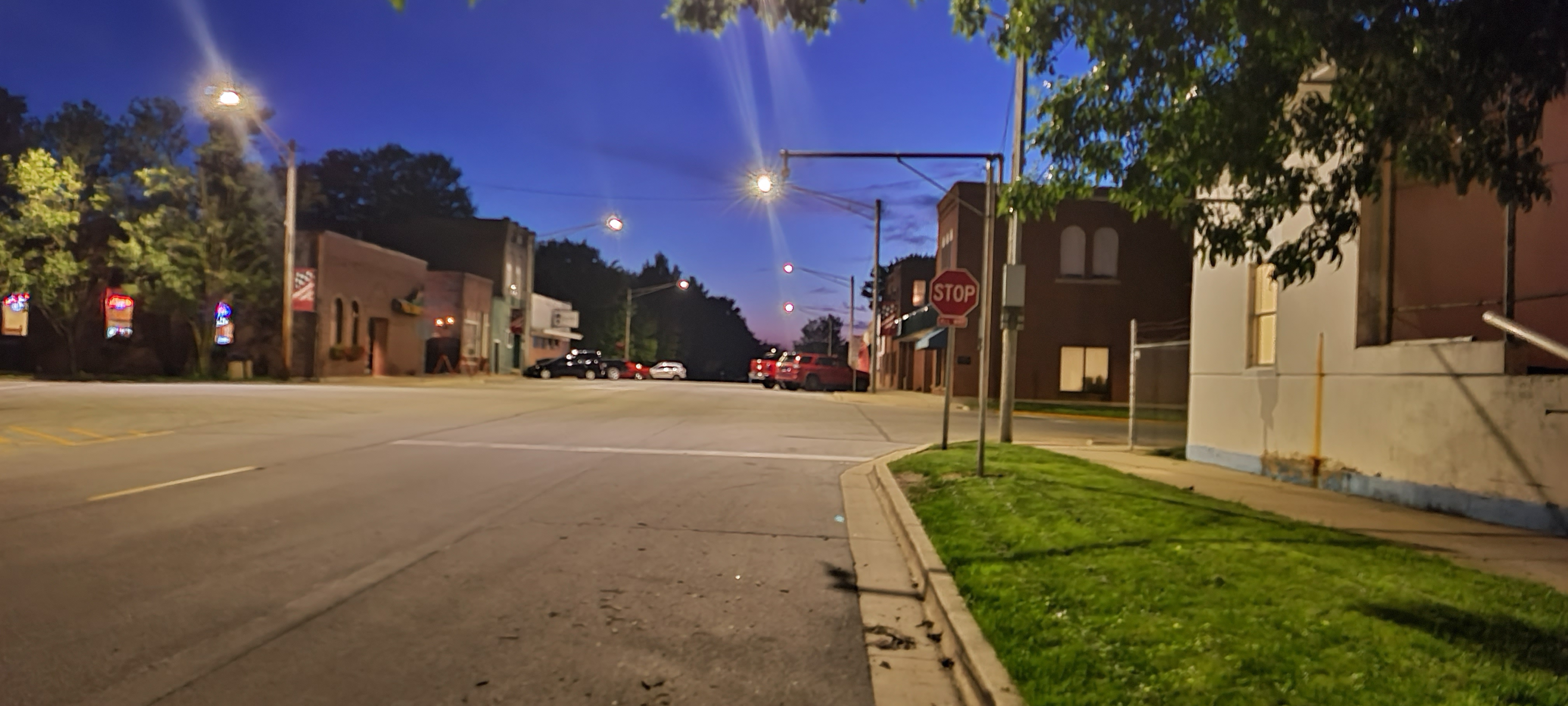
- Downtown Philo, Illinois; Philo, Illinois
- Nickname: "Center of the Universe"
- Location of Philo in Champaign County, Illinois.

- Location in Champaign County#Location in Illinois Philo, Illinois (Illinois)
- Coordinates: 40°00′05″N 88°09′23″W
- Country: United States
- State: Illinois
- County: Champaign

Area
  - Total: 0.83 sq mi (2.15 km^{2})
  - Land: 0.83 sq mi (2.15 km^{2})
  - Water: 0 sq mi (0.00 km^{2})
- Elevation: 738 ft (225 m)

Population (2020)
  - Total: 1,392
  - Density: 1,679.3/sq mi (648.39/km^{2})
- Time zone: UTC-6 (CST)
  - Summer (DST): UTC-5 (CDT)
- Zip code: 61864
- Area code: 217
- FIPS code: 17-59533
- GNIS feature ID: 2399666
- Website: http://villageofphilo.com/

Philo is a village in Champaign County, Illinois, United States. The population was 1,392 at the 2020 census.

== Geography ==
Philo is located three miles south of Urbana township and six miles south of the city of Urbana. The legend "Center of the Universe" is painted on the village water tower, along with its zipcode.

According to the 2021 census gazetteer files, Philo has a total area of 0.83 square miles (2.15 km^{2}), all land.

Philo was named after the founder Philo Hale. The main park (Hale Park), which is used for numerous functions including reserved space for family reunions, is located on the north end of the village and is named after the founder.

== Demographics ==
Historical population
| Census | Pop. | Note | %± |
|---|---|---|---|
| 1870 | 291 | | — |
| 1880 | 435 | | 49.5% |
| 1890 | 491 | | 12.9% |
| 1900 | 502 | | 2.2% |
| 1910 | 562 | | 12.0% |
| 1920 | 544 | | −3.2% |
| 1930 | 512 | | −5.9% |
| 1940 | 510 | | −0.4% |
| 1950 | 525 | | 2.9% |
| 1960 | 740 | | 41.0% |
| 1970 | 1,022 | | 38.1% |
| 1980 | 973 | | −4.8% |
| 1990 | 1,028 | | 5.7% |
| 2000 | 1,314 | | 27.8% |
| 2010 | 1,466 | | 11.6% |
| 2020 | 1,392 | | −5.0% |
U.S. Decennial Census

=== 2020 census ===
As of the 2020 census, Philo had a population of 1,392, with 532 households and 360 families residing in the village. The population density was 1,679.13 inhabitants per square mile (648.32/km^{2}). There were 561 housing units at an average density of 676.72 per square mile (261.28/km^{2}). 0.0% of residents lived in urban areas, while 100.0% lived in rural areas.

The median age was 40.1 years. 23.8% of residents were under the age of 18 and 17.9% of residents were 65 years of age or older. For every 100 females there were 92.0 males, and for every 100 females age 18 and over there were 96.1 males age 18 and over.

Among households, 32.3% had children under the age of 18 living in them. Of all households, 66.0% were married-couple households, 11.8% were households with a male householder and no spouse or partner present, and 16.4% were households with a female householder and no spouse or partner present. About 19.2% of all households were made up of individuals, and 8.2% had someone living alone who was 65 years of age or older.

Of all housing units, 5.2% were vacant. The homeowner vacancy rate was 1.7% and the rental vacancy rate was 9.7%.

Racial composition as of the 2020 census
| Race | Number | Percent |
|---|---|---|
| White | 1,321 | 94.9% |
| Black or African American | 3 | 0.2% |
| American Indian and Alaska Native | 3 | 0.2% |
| Asian | 3 | 0.2% |
| Native Hawaiian and Other Pacific Islander | 4 | 0.3% |
| Some other race | 13 | 0.9% |
| Two or more races | 45 | 3.2% |
| Hispanic or Latino (of any race) | 10 | 0.7% |

=== Income and poverty ===
The median income for a household in the village was $91,156, and the median income for a family was $93,889. Males had a median income of $43,690 versus $36,090 for females. The per capita income for the village was $36,383. No families and 3.1% of the population were below the poverty line, including 9.6% of those under age 18 and 3.6% of those age 65 or over.

== Education ==
Philo is in the Unit 7 School District, based in nearby Tolono. Residents attend Unity East Elementary, Unity Junior High, and Unity High School.

Philo also has a Catholic Grade School, St. Thomas, for grades pre-K through 8th, and in nearby Champaign is the High School of Saint Thomas More.

== Sesquicentennial ==
In July 2025, Philo marked the 150th anniversary of its founding with a four-day Sesquicentennial celebration held in Hale Park and downtown Philo. Events included a community talent show, farm-themed activities, live music, a 5K run, a parade, food vendors, and evening fireworks.
