= Institute of Aviation (University of Illinois Urbana-Champaign) =

US aviation institute

Coordinates: 40.03938°N 88.25516°W

The Institute of Aviation was an aviation institute affiliated with the University of Illinois Urbana-Champaign. Founded in 1945, it was located at the university-owned Willard Airport in Savoy, Illinois, United States. The institute was the first school in the U.S. to be certified by the Federal Aviation Administration to conduct all tests leading to the issuance of civilian pilot certificates. It had a long history of providing flight training, and was particularly well known for conducting research into aviation-related human factors. For training purposes, the institute maintained a fleet of 18 Piper Archers, 7 Piper Arrows, 3 twin-engine Piper Seminoles and two Cessna 152s.

== 2010 review of institute ==
The Institute of Aviation was placed under review by the University of Illinois in the spring of 2010. The university faced a major budget shortfall, and was owed $431 million by the state of Illinois. Closing the institute was proposed as a means of cutting costs.

== Closure of institute/transfer to Parkland College ==
On July 21, 2011 university trustees voted 6–2 to close the institute by the 2013–14 academic year, allowing current students to finish. This vote marked the end of over 60 years on campus for the institute. In the year prior to the institute's closure, there were fewer than 160 students, 34 of those were freshmen. It was also said to be the smallest degree granting unit with "some of the highest costs" on campus.

However, in September 2013, the university entered a three-year agreement with Parkland College in Champaign to transfer ownership of the institute to the community college for continued flight training. The Parkland College Institute of Aviation at the University of Illinois allows students to earn a two-year associate degree in aviation or take courses to earn FAA-approved pilot certification to various levels. Leasing the university's aircraft and facilities at Willard Airport in Savoy, Parkland’s flight institute planned to open for the fall 2014 academic semester and began accepting applications at the end of March 2014.

== Former programs of study ==
The Institute of Aviation offered a B.S. in Aviation Human Factors. This program of study focused on aircraft safety, accident prevention, and human factors psychology; the core curriculum was a mixture of flight and psychology courses. Through the flight courses, students could earn their private pilot certificate, commercial pilot certificate, instrument rating, and multi-engine rating. The psychology courses provided the students with an understanding of operator and machine interaction.

Some university students were interested in flight training, but would prefer to pursue a degree in another field. For these students, the Professional Pilot program was an option. In this program, the students were able to earn their private pilot's certificate and instrument rating while still pursuing a non aviation degree. Students then transferred to a different college at the University of Illinois in order to complete their bachelor's degree.

== Former courses offered ==
The following is a list of both flight and non-flight course options that were offered by the institute for the 2009–10 school year. For the current course options, they are listed in the Parkland College catalog excerpt as well as in the previous paragraph regarding the transfer of the institute and the new program.
