= Brian Cardinal =

American basketball player (born 1977)

Personal information
- Born: May 2, 1977 (age 49) Tolono, Illinois, U.S.
- Listed height: 6 ft 8 in (2.03 m)
- Listed weight: 240 lb (109 kg)

Career information
- High school: Unity (Tolono, Illinois)
- College: Purdue (1996–2000)
- NBA draft: 2000: 2nd round, 44th overall pick
- Drafted by: Detroit Pistons
- Playing career: 2000–2012
- Position: Power forward
- Number: 35, 14

Career history
- 2000–2002: Detroit Pistons
- 2002: Washington Wizards
- 2002–2003: Pamesa Valencia
- 2003–2004: Golden State Warriors
- 2004–2008: Memphis Grizzlies
- 2008–2010: Minnesota Timberwolves
- 2010–2012: Dallas Mavericks

Career highlights
- NBA champion (2011); ULEB Eurocup champion (2003); Second-team Big Ten (2000); 2× Third-team Big Ten (1998, 1999)

Career statistics
- Points: 2,108 (4.6 ppg)
- Rebounds: 1,050 (2.3 rpg)
- Assists: 465 (1.0 apg)
- Stats at NBA.com
- Stats at Basketball Reference
Medals
Men's basketball
Representing United States
Goodwill Games
Gold medal – first place	1998 New York	Team competition

Brian Greg Cardinal (born May 2, 1977) is an American former professional basketball player. Nicknamed "the Custodian" and "the Janitor", he played 456 games in the National Basketball Association (NBA) between 2000 and 2012, and won an NBA championship with the Dallas Mavericks in 2011. Before his NBA career, he played college basketball for the Purdue Boilermakers.

== Early life ==
Brian Cardinal attended Unity High School in Tolono, Illinois, where he played basketball with his brother, Troy. Before graduating in 1995, he led the Rockets to an 86–25 record during his high school career. He averaged 23.5 points during his Junior year, with the team going 27–1, and 24.1 points and 12.0 rebounds per game in his Senior year, with the team going 27–4. In his senior year, he scored 40 points in two different games, and was ranked as one of the Top 100 high school seniors in the United States. As a senior, he played in the Class A Illinois Basketball Coaches Association All-Star Game, and was named MVP of the game. He also played in and was named Most High Player in the Coca-Cola high school all star game, after scoring 24 points and collecting 13 rebounds for the West team.

== College career ==
After graduating from high school, Cardinal attended Purdue University in West Lafayette, Indiana, to play under head coach Gene Keady and assistant coaches Frank Kendrick and Bruce Weber. Cardinal was redshirted during his first year at Purdue but practiced daily with the team. During his Freshman season of 1996–97, Brian was one of only three Boilermakers to start all 30 games, and averaged 10.7 points a game (third on the team) and grabbed 182 rebounds on the season, ranking second on the team. He recorded his first collegiate double-double in only his second game against Western Michigan with 13 points and 12 rebounds. He finished ninth in Big Ten in steals. Along with Juniors Brad Miller and Chad Austin, he helped lead the Boilermakers to an NCAA Tournament Second Round appearance. Purdue beat Rhode Island in the first round of the tournament after Brian hit a three-point shot to send the game into overtime, a shot Brian later called his "biggest long shlong donkey kong." Purdue would lose in the next round to #1 seed Kansas.

In Brian's sophomore campaign, he averaged 12.0 points, 4.9 rebounds and 1.8 assists, and led the team in steals with 65, which tied for the third-best single season total in Purdue history. While leading Purdue to a 28–8 record (12–4 in the Big Ten), Brian was the Boilermakers' top scorer in four games. Brian was named third-team All-Big Ten by coaches and media. He helped lead the Boilers to a Sweet Sixteen appearance, with the Boilermakers beating Delaware and Detroit Mercy in the first two rounds, before losing to eventual Final Four semifinalist Stanford, by the score of 67–59.

In his junior season in 1998–99, Brian was named team captain. On the season, he averaged 11.4 points and grabbed 186 rebounds, leading the Boilermakers in rebounding 15 times. He also led the team in assists. During the season, he became Purdue's all time steals leader, and tied the school's all-time single game steals record with seven steals against South Carolina on December 22, 1998. He scored a career-high 33 points in a game against Michigan on January 23, 1999. For the second straight year, Brian was named third-team All-Big Ten. In the NCAA Tournament, Brian led Purdue to a second straight Sweet Sixteen appearance, with wins over #7 seed Texas and #2 seed Miami (FL), with Brian leading the team with 20 points in the win over the Hurricanes.

Cardinal played his last collegiate season in 1999–2000 as Boilermakers' captain for the second straight season. He finished his senior year with career season highs with 203 rebounds and 13.9 points a game. As a senior, he was named a Second Team All-Big Ten selection. He again helped lead the Boilermakers to the NCAA tournament, making it a perfect four NCAA tournament appearances in Brian's four years at Purdue. In this NCAA tournament appearance for Brian, the team would make its deepest run, nearly making the Final Four. After a narrow one point victory over #11 seed Dayton in the first round, Purdue upset #3 seed Oklahoma and defeated the #10 seed Gonzaga, before losing to Big Ten rival Wisconsin, a #8 seed, in the Elite Eight.

As of 2018, Brian Cardinal ranks 18th on the Purdue all-time scoring list, with 1,584 points. He ranks second in career starts at Purdue with 125, behind E'Twaun Moore, who started 136 games. His career 259 steals at Purdue is the second most in school history behind Chris Kramer's 260 (2006–2010). His Freshman record with 51 steals in the 1996–97 season was also surpassed by Chris Kramer's 64 a decade later. He received the nickname, "the Janitor", due to the way he cleaned the floor diving for loose balls. Brian left Purdue being the only Boilermaker to receive both the "Mr. Hustle" Award (for most determination, drive and leadership) and the "Courage" Award (for most charges taken) four years in a row.

While at Purdue, Brian won a gold medal at the 1998 Goodwill games; Team USA went 4–1. He was also a member of the 1997 22-and under National Team coached by Rick Majerus, which finished 5th in a 12-team field. For Majerus' squad, Brian averaged 2.4 points and 1.6 rebounds, shooting 53.3% from the field.

== Professional career ==
=== Detroit Pistons (2000–2002) ===
Cardinal was selected the 44th overall pick in the 2000 NBA draft by the Detroit Pistons. His career debut came on December 9, 2000, in a loss to the Portland Trail Blazers. During his rookie season, playing in only 15 games, he had his best game against the Toronto Raptors on April 11, 2001, scoring a season-high 9 points, 4 rebounds and a game high three steals in 18 minutes. Playing in a total of 23 games for the Pistons in two seasons, he averaged 2.1 points a game and shot over 80 percent from the free throw line.

=== Washington Wizards (2002) ===
On September 11, 2002, Cardinal was traded to the Washington Wizards along with Jerry Stackhouse and Ratko Varda, for Richard Hamilton, Hubert Davis and Bobby Simmons. Cardinal was waived shortly after playing in only five games for the Wizards.

=== Valencia (2002–2003) ===
Cardinal spent the rest of the 2002–03 season playing in the Spanish league for Pamesa Valencia, winning the ULEB Cup Championship.

=== Golden State Warriors (2003–2004) ===
After returning to the NBA, Cardinal signed with the Golden State Warriors. Cardinal had a breakthrough season with the Warriors, averaging nearly 10 points and 4 rebounds per game appearing in 76 games. He was a finalist for the NBA Most Improved Player Award, eventually won by Zach Randolph. On February 11, 2004, Cardinal scored a career-high 32 points against the Phoenix Suns and just three weeks later he had his career high of 14 rebounds against the Chicago Bulls on February 28.

=== Memphis Grizzlies (2004–2008) ===
After a breakthrough season in personal numbers and playing time, Cardinal signed a six-year, $34.6 million contract as a free agent with the Memphis Grizzlies, where he posted similar numbers from the previous season, averaging almost 6 points and 2.5 rebounds in the four seasons with the Grizzlies, while injuries diminished playing time. During the 2006–07 season, Brian held career highs of field goal percentage (.494) and free throw percentage (.926).

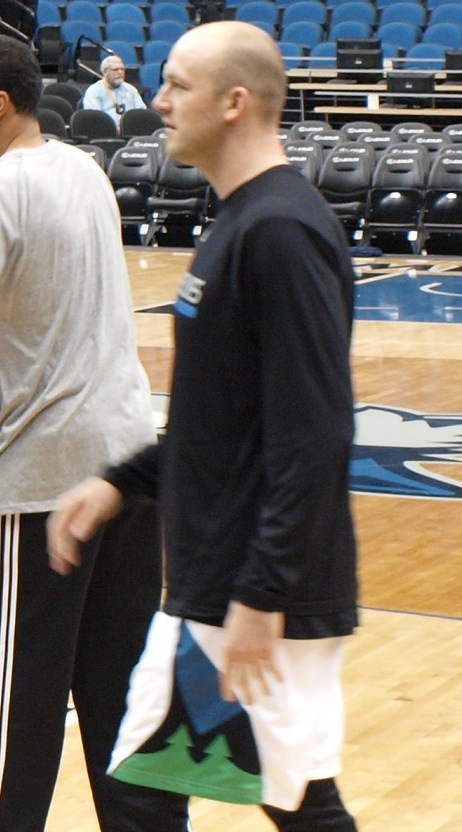
Cardinal with the Timberwolves in 2009

=== Minnesota Timberwolves (2008–2010) ===
In June 2008, Cardinal was traded to the Minnesota Timberwolves as part of an eight-player deal. Teamed with fellow forward Kevin Love in his eighth season in the NBA under head coach Kevin McHale and assistant coach Jerry Sichting, a former Boilermaker, Brian averaged 3 points, 2.2 rebounds and 1.2 assists a game for the 2008–09 season. He recorded his career-high three blocks in a game against the New York Knicks on March 13, 2009. In the 2009–10 season, while appearing in 27 games for the Wolves, he averaged a team-low 9 minutes per game and went 21–21 from the free-throw line. On February 17, 2010, Cardinal was traded to the New York Knicks for Darko Miličić. He was subsequently waived by the Knicks on February 19. On March 23, he was re-signed by the Timberwolves.

=== Dallas Mavericks (2010–2012) ===
On September 27, 2010, Cardinal was signed by the Dallas Mavericks. On May 8, 2011, Cardinal hit the 20th three-pointer in Game 4 of the Dallas Mavericks and Los Angeles Lakers series. His three-pointer tied the record for most three-pointers by a team in one playoff game with 20, which hadn't been done since the Seattle SuperSonics did it against the Houston Rockets on May 6, 1996. Cardinal won his first NBA championship with the 2011 Mavericks in a six-game playoff series against the Miami Heat. He agreed to sign a new one-year contract worth the veteran minimum on December 12, 2011. His final NBA game was in Game 3 of the 2012 Western Conference First Round on May 3, 2012, in a 79–95 loss to the Oklahoma City Thunder where he recorded 3 points and 3 rebounds. The Thunder would go on to sweep the Mavericks and eliminate them from the playoffs, with Cardinal subsequently retiring from the NBA.

== NBA career statistics ==
Legend
GP	Games played	GS	Games started	MPG	Minutes per game
FG%	Field goal percentage	3P%	3-point field goal percentage	FT%	Free throw percentage
RPG	Rebounds per game	APG	Assists per game	SPG	Steals per game
BPG	Blocks per game	PPG	Points per game	**Bold**	Career high
†	Won an NBA championship

=== Regular season ===
Year	Team	GP	GS	MPG	FG%	3P%	FT%	RPG	APG	SPG	BPG	PPG
2000–01	Detroit	15	0	8.4	.323	.000	.611	1.5	.2	.5	.1	1.0
2001–02	Detroit	8	0	5.4	.462	.429	**1.000**	.8	.3	.1	.0	2.1
2002–03	Washington	5	0	3.0	.250	.000	**1.000**	1.0	.2	.0	.0	.8
2003–04	Golden State	**76**	11	21.5	.472	.444	.878	**4.2**	1.4	.9	**.3**	**9.6**
2004–05	Memphis	58	**16**	**24.7**	.370	.352	.873	3.9	**2.0**	**1.5**	**.3**	9.0
2005–06	Memphis	36	0	11.2	.414	.448	.704	1.5	.9	.6	.0	3.4
2006–07	Memphis	28	1	11.2	**.494**	.409	.926	2.1	1.1	.8	.0	4.5
2007–08	Memphis	37	1	11.9	.341	.309	.684	2.6	.6	.3	.1	3.4
2008–09	Minnesota	64	4	14.2	.385	.326	.857	2.2	1.2	.6	.2	3.0
2009–10	Minnesota	29	0	9.2	.389	.333	.944	1.0	.8	.3	.1	1.7
2010–11†	Dallas	56	4	11.0	.430	.**483**	.944	1.1	.7	.4	.1	2.6
2011–12	Dallas	44	0	6.3	.255	.204	.833	.8	.4	.2	.0	1.0
Career		456	37	14.2	.408	.372	.861	2.3	1.0	.6	.2	4.6

=== Playoffs ===
Year	Team	GP	GS	MPG	FG%	3P%	FT%	RPG	APG	SPG	BPG	PPG
2005	Memphis	4	0	**19.5**	.391	.000	**.727**	**3.0**	**.5**	**.8**	.0	**6.5**
2006	Memphis	3	0	7.3	.500	.500	.000	1.3	.3	.3	.0	1.0
2011†	Dallas	**9**	0	4.1	**.750**	.750	.500	.3	.2	.1	.0	1.1
2012	Dallas	2	0	4.5	.500	**1.000**	.000	1.5	.0	.0	.0	1.5
Career		18	0	8.1	.452	.455	.692	1.2	.3	.3	.0	2.3

== Personal life ==
Brian's father, Rod Cardinal, was the head basketball trainer at the University of Illinois for three decades, from 1973 to 2003; he remains with the Illinois men's basketball team as their special projects coordinator. Brian served as a towel boy for the 1989 Illinois Final Four team. Brian is married to former Purdue walk-on player Danielle Bird, with whom he has a son and two daughters. Brian’s son, Bryson Cardinal plays basketball for the Butler Bulldogs.
