= Hensley Township, Champaign County, Illinois =

Hensley Township
- Township
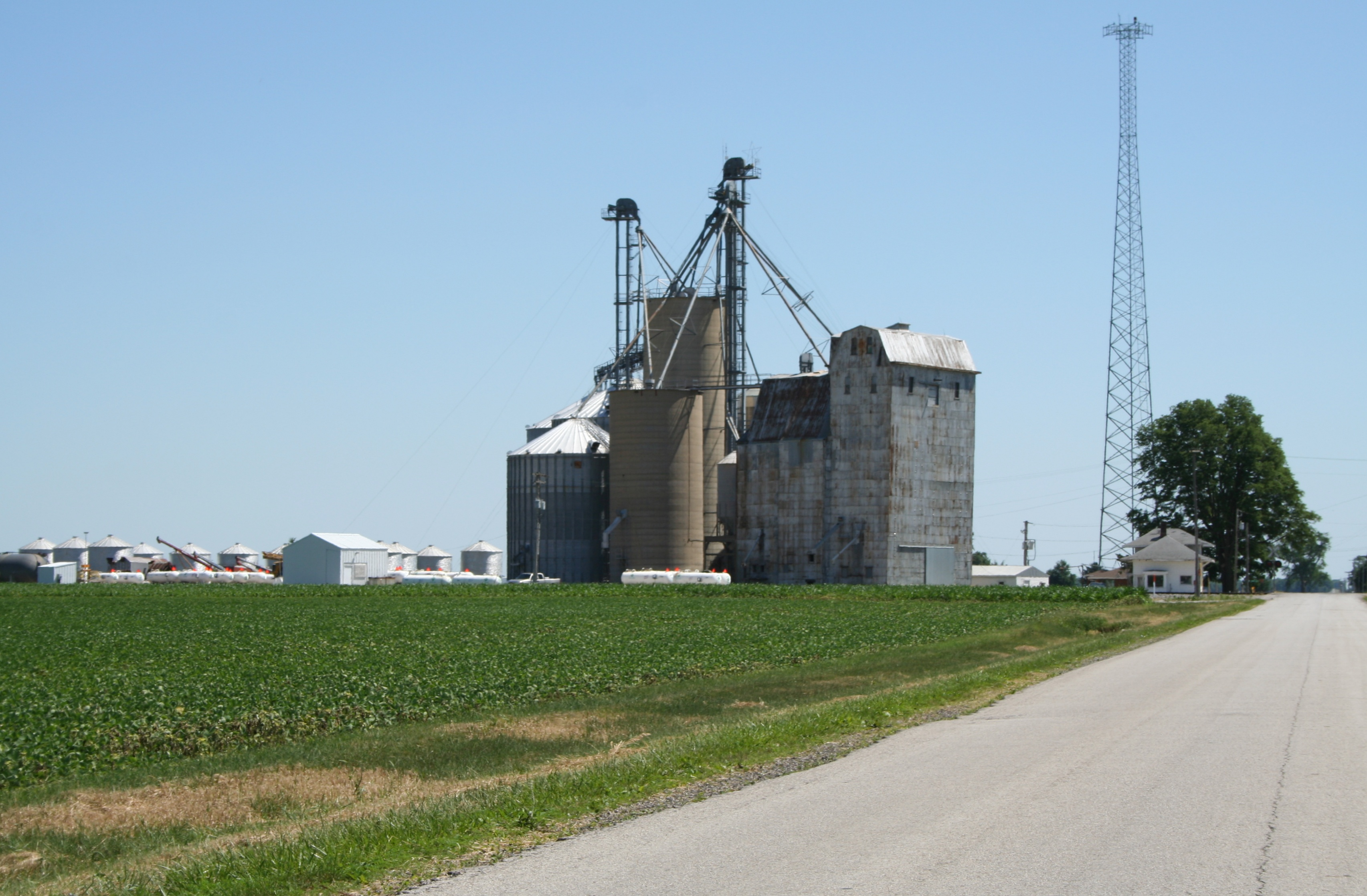
- Rising road and the Rising Farmers Grain Company elevator in the southwest corner of section 29.

- Location in Champaign County

- Champaign County's location in Illinois
- Coordinates: 40°10′42″N 88°17′12″W
- Country: United States
- State: Illinois
- County: Champaign
- Established: September 1866

Area
  - Total: 30.16 sq mi (78.1 km^{2})
  - Land: 30.16 sq mi (78.1 km^{2})
  - Water: 0 sq mi (0 km^{2}) 0%
- Elevation: 774 ft (236 m)

Population (2020)
  - Total: 1,033
  - Density: 34.25/sq mi (13.22/km^{2})
- Time zone: UTC-6 (CST)
  - Summer (DST): UTC-5 (CDT)
- FIPS code: 17-019-34189

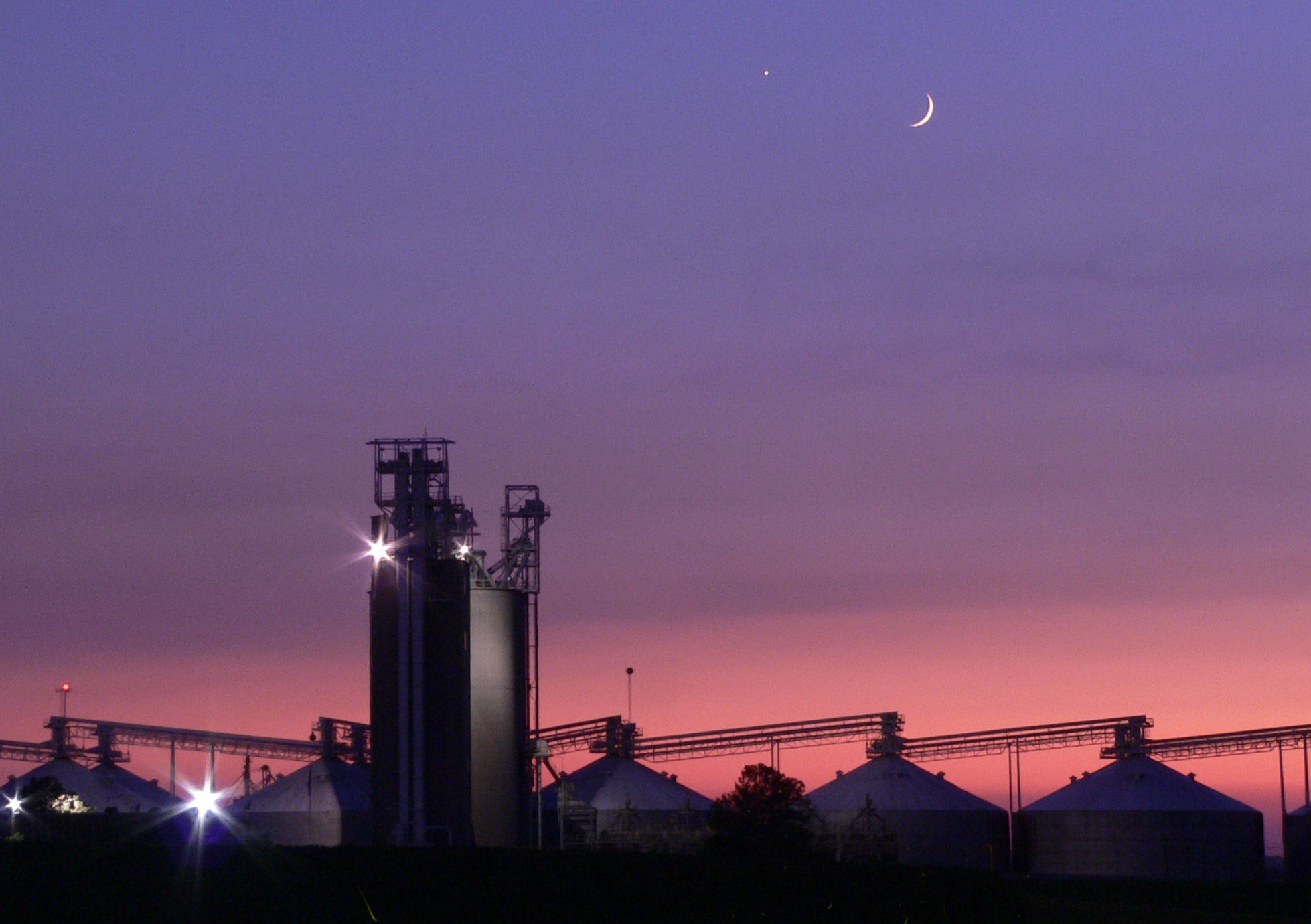
The Andersons, a grain elevator facility in section 29 of Hensley Township.

Hensley Township is a township in Champaign County, Illinois, USA. As of the 2020 census, its population was 1,033 and it contained 464 housing units.

== History ==
Hensley Township formed from Champaign Township in September, 1866 as Grant Township, but the name was changed to Hensley on an unknown date. Hensley Township received its name from Archibald P. Hensley (1806-1876), one of the earliest settlers of that part of the country.

== Geography ==
Hensley is Township 20 North, Range 8 East of the Third Principal Meridian.

According to the 2010 census, the township has a total area of 30.16 square miles (78.1 km^{2}), all land. The source of the Kaskaskia River is located in section 19 of this township, rising from the Kaskaskia ditch. The Kaskaskia watershed drains directly into the Mississippi River.

=== Cities and towns ===
- Mahomet (east edge)

=== Unincorporated towns ===
- Rising

=== Cemeteries ===
The township contains seven cemeteries: Bethlehem , Fisher , George Peters Family, Grandview Memorial Gardens , Gregory Burial and Haines Family.

=== Grain elevators ===
The Andersons Grain and Fertilizer (Section 29), 3515 North Staley Road (County Road 800 East) opened in 1968. The Andersons grain assets were sold to Total Grain Marketing of Effingham, Illinois in September 2021. It is the largest grain elevator in Illinois with more than 16 million bushels of storage capacity.

Rising Station elevator (Section 29) was built along the Big Four—Conrail System railroad in 1917. It is operated by the Rising Farmer's Grain Company. It has the original wooden elevator and several concrete silos on Rising Road (County Road 700 East).

=== Public transit ===
- Champaign–Urbana Mass Transit District

=== Major highways ===
- Interstate 57
- Interstate 74
- U.S. Route 150

=== Airports and landing strips ===
- Andrew RLA Airport
- Champaign Airport (historical)
- McCulley Airport (closed)

== Demographics ==
As of the 2020 census there were 1,033 people, 355 households, and 255 families residing in the township. The population density was 34.29 inhabitants per square mile (13.24/km^{2}). There were 464 housing units at an average density of 15.40 per square mile (5.95/km^{2}). The racial makeup of the township was 63.31% White, 21.30% African American, 0.29% Native American, 1.26% Asian, 0.00% Pacific Islander, 4.74% from other races, and 9.10% from two or more races. Hispanic or Latino of any race were 9.29% of the population.

There were 355 households, out of which 31.00% had children under the age of 18 living with them, 57.18% were married couples living together, 12.11% had a female householder with no spouse present, and 28.17% were non-families. 16.10% of all households were made up of individuals, and 8.70% had someone living alone who was 65 years of age or older. The average household size was 2.68 and the average family size was 3.12.

The township's age distribution consisted of 23.1% under the age of 18, 7.4% from 18 to 24, 20.8% from 25 to 44, 28.8% from 45 to 64, and 20.0% who were 65 years of age or older. The median age was 41.7 years. For every 100 females, there were 103.9 males. For every 100 females age 18 and over, there were 74.5 males.

The median income for a household in the township was $71,088, and the median income for a family was $82,875. Males had a median income of $41,111 versus $27,390 for females. The per capita income for the township was $32,935. About 3.5% of families and 2.4% of the population were below the poverty line.

Historical population
Census	Pop.	Note	%±
2010	1,278		—
2020	1,033		−19.2%
U.S. Decennial Census
