= Tolono, Illinois =

Tolono
- Village
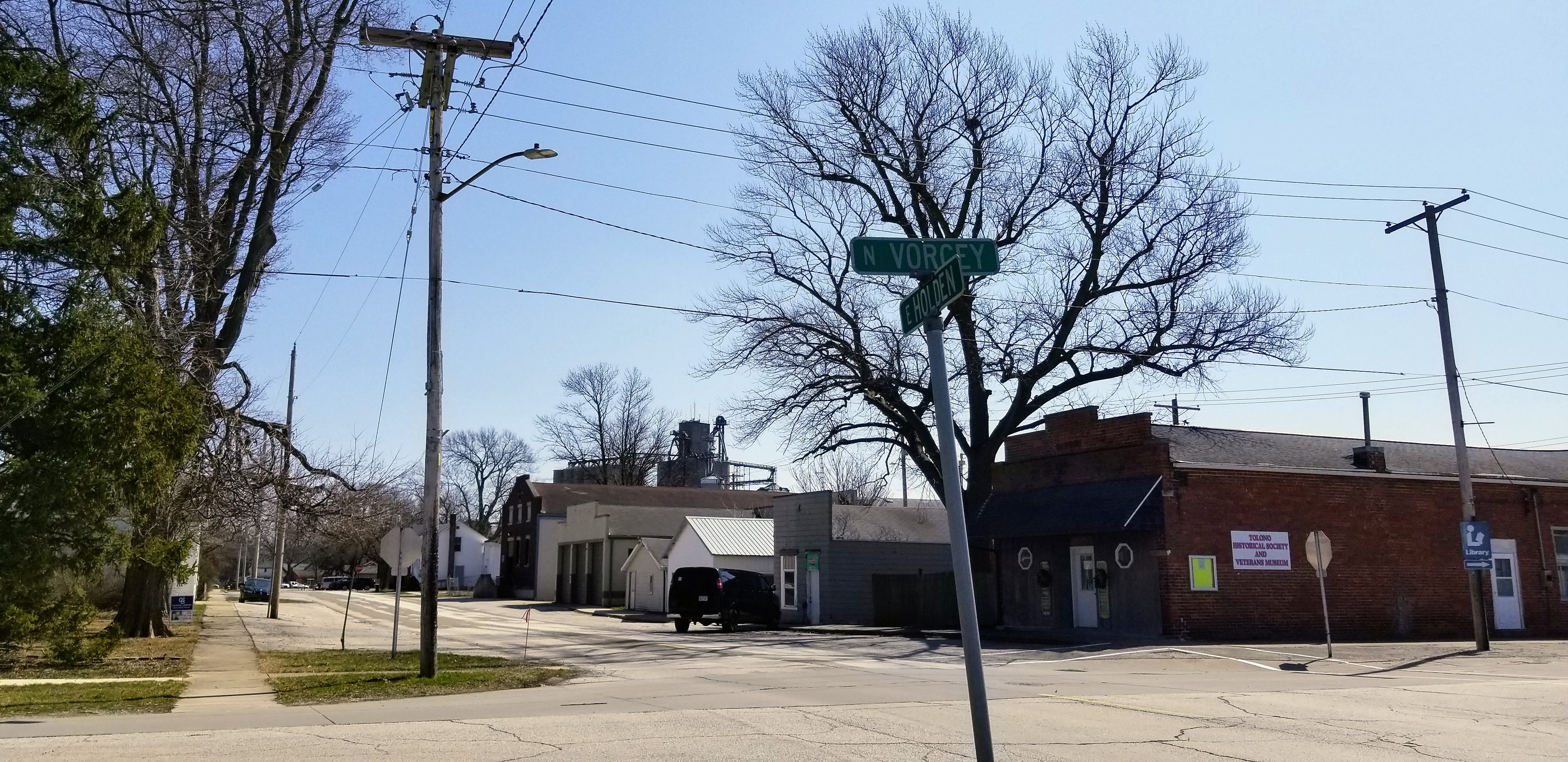
- Tolono Historical Society and Veteran's Museum

- Location of Tolono in Champaign County, Illinois.

- Location within Champaign County Tolono (Illinois)
- Coordinates: 39°59′10″N 88°15′35″W
- Country: United States
- State: Illinois
- County: Champaign
- Township: Tolono

Area
  - Total: 2.06 sq mi (5.34 km^{2})
  - Land: 2.06 sq mi (5.34 km^{2})
  - Water: 0 sq mi (0.00 km^{2})
- Elevation: 735 ft (224 m)

Population (2020)
  - Total: 3,604
  - Density: 1,748.4/sq mi (675.07/km^{2})
- Time zone: UTC-6 (CST)
  - Summer (DST): UTC-5 (CDT)
- ZIP code: 61880
- Area code: 217
- FIPS code: 17-75614
- GNIS feature ID: 2399992
- Website: http://tolonoil.us/

Tolono is a village in Tolono Township, Champaign County, Illinois, United States. The population was 3,604 at the 2020 census. Its name was fabricated by J.B. Calhoun, land commission of the Illinois Central Railroad, who wrote about it simply: "[I] placed the vowel o three times, thus o-o-o, and filling in with the consonants t-l-n."

== History ==
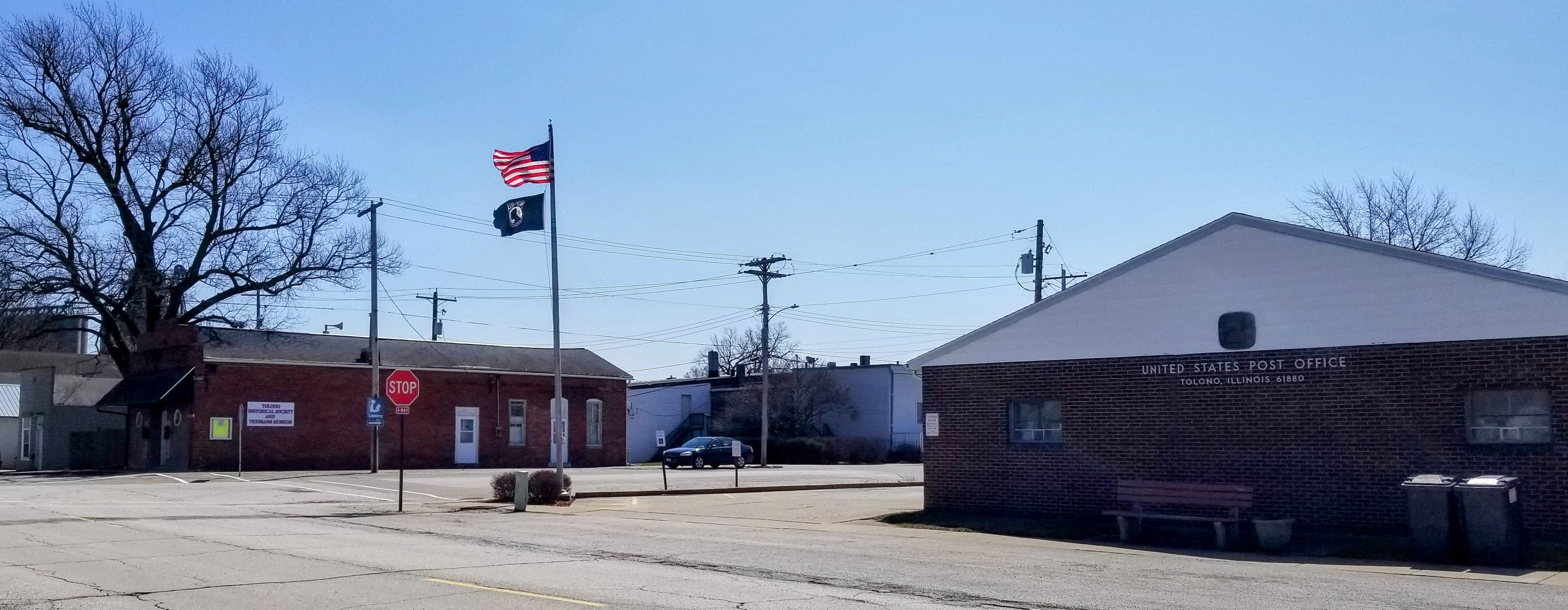
Tolono post office

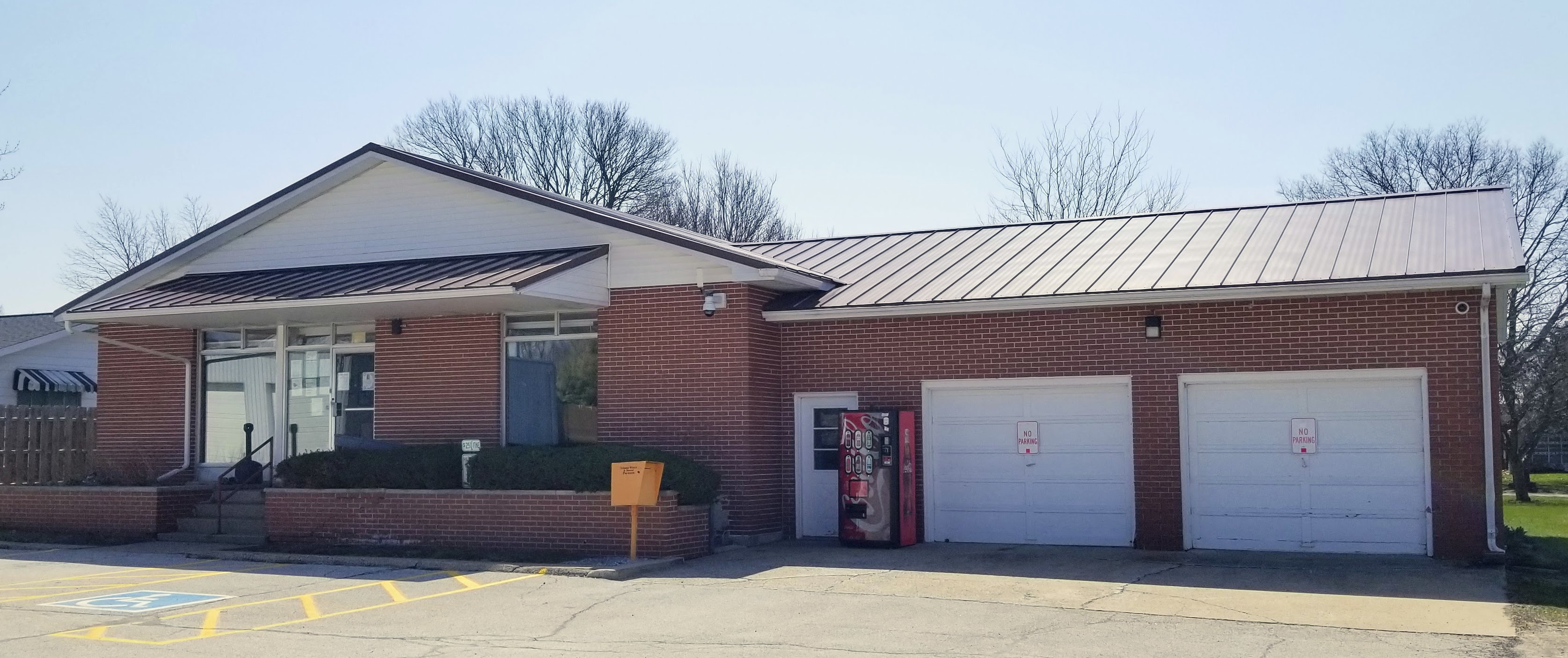
Tolono village office

Founded in the early 19th century as a result of the land-grant Illinois Central Railroad's expansion southward, Tolono was initially home to many railroad employees. Many streets bear the names of the IC's administrative staff. The original homes in the community were small and narrow filling half lots adjacent to the railroad tracks. With the intersection of an east–west railway, Tolono became a featured stop for early rail passengers. The peak of the railroad's passenger influence in Tolono occurred when Tolono became the last stop in Illinois for Abraham Lincoln as he bid farewell to his home state in a speech given from the back of his coach.

In 1959, Tolono became home to the first Monical's Pizza restaurant. Although the original location does not bear the Monical's name any longer, the buildings still stand and another Monical's Pizza is operated less than a block away. Members of the entrepreneurial Monical family still reside in the village today.

After shooting in several locations in Tolono in 2006, Mark Roberts, a Tolono native, wrapped production on his feature-length movie "Welcome To Tolono". The film was highlighted on the 2007 film festival circuit. Welcome To Tolono focuses on an Alcoholics Anonymous group that meets in the basement of a Tolono church.

== Geography ==
According to the history of Champaign County: A surveyor for the Illinois Central who was looking for a division headquarters, surveyed the Tolono area and wrote on a map 'too low, No.' and that became the name of the town established there. Tolono at one time had two or three companies making tile used to drain the land around the town, resulting in swamps on the east side of the town both on the north and south side of the Wabash Railroad.

According to the 2021 census gazetteer files, Tolono has a total area of 2.06 square miles (5.34 km^{2}), all land.

== Demographics ==
Historical population
Census	Pop.	Note	%±
1870	777		—
1880	905		16.5%
1890	902		−0.3%
1900	845		−6.3%
1910	760		−10.1%
1920	693		−8.8%
1930	790		14.0%
1940	876		10.9%
1950	1,065		21.6%
1960	1,539		44.5%
1970	2,027		31.7%
1980	2,434		20.1%
1990	2,605		7.0%
2000	2,700		3.6%
2010	3,447		27.7%
2020	3,604		4.6%
U.S. Decennial Census

=== 2020 census ===
As of the 2020 census, Tolono had a population of 3,604 and 789 families. The population density was 1,748.67 inhabitants per square mile (675.17/km^{2}). The median age was 38.5 years. 26.6% of residents were under the age of 18 and 12.9% were 65 years of age or older. For every 100 females there were 94.5 males, and for every 100 females age 18 and over there were 91.3 males age 18 and over.

0.0% of residents lived in urban areas, while 100.0% lived in rural areas.

There were 1,383 households in Tolono, of which 36.2% had children under the age of 18 living in them. Of all households, 52.7% were married-couple households, 14.0% were households with a male householder and no spouse or partner present, and 24.9% were households with a female householder and no spouse or partner present. About 25.6% of all households were made up of individuals and 11.8% had someone living alone who was 65 years of age or older.

There were 1,458 housing units, of which 5.1% were vacant. The homeowner vacancy rate was 1.6% and the rental vacancy rate was 8.6%. Housing density was 707.42 per square mile (273.14/km^{2}).

Racial composition as of the 2020 census
Race	Number	Percent
White	3,284	91.1%
Black or African American	40	1.1%
American Indian and Alaska Native	17	0.5%
Asian	15	0.4%
Native Hawaiian and Other Pacific Islander	1	0.0%
Some other race	41	1.1%
Two or more races	206	5.7%
Hispanic or Latino (of any race)	94	2.6%

=== Income and poverty ===
The median income for a household in the village was $62,788, and the median income for a family was $92,452. Males had a median income of $55,521 versus $31,643 for females. The per capita income for the village was $26,693. About 10.5% of families and 13.2% of the population were below the poverty line, including 16.4% of those under age 18 and 30.4% of those age 65 or over.

== Education ==
Community Unit School District # 7 or Unit Seven Schools is a district that serves preschool through twelfth grade in the greater Tolono area. The school district covers 173 square miles (450 km^{2}) covering the communities of Tolono, Philo, Sidney, Sadorus, and Pesotum. In August 2002, there were three new schools, Unity East Elementary (approximately 300 students from Sidney and Philo), Unity West Elementary (approximately 400 students from Pesotum, Sadorus, and Tolono), and Unity Junior High (approximately 200 students district-wide) featuring the Rocket Center gymnasium. Along with the existing High School, there are now four schools instead of seven. The district is located in a rural agricultural setting 10 miles (16 km) south of Champaign-Urbana, minutes from both Parkland College and the University of Illinois.

== Notable people ==
- George Washington Burr, Major General during World War I
- Brian Cardinal, NBA forward
- Mark Roberts, screenwriter; best known for creating the American sitcom Mike & Molly
- Rocky Ryan, NFL player with the Philadelphia Eagles and Chicago Bears
- Matt Talbott, frontman of influential rock band Hum. Owner of Loose Cobra, the Tolono bar and venue.
