= Long Prairie Township, Mississippi County, Missouri =

Township in Mississippi County, Missouri, U.S.

Coordinates: 36.8833°N 89.4603°W

Long Prairie Township is an inactive township in Mississippi County, in the U.S. state of Missouri.

Long Prairie Township was established in 1858, and named for a prairie of the same name within its borders.
