= Redinger Ditch =

Stream in northern Indiana, US

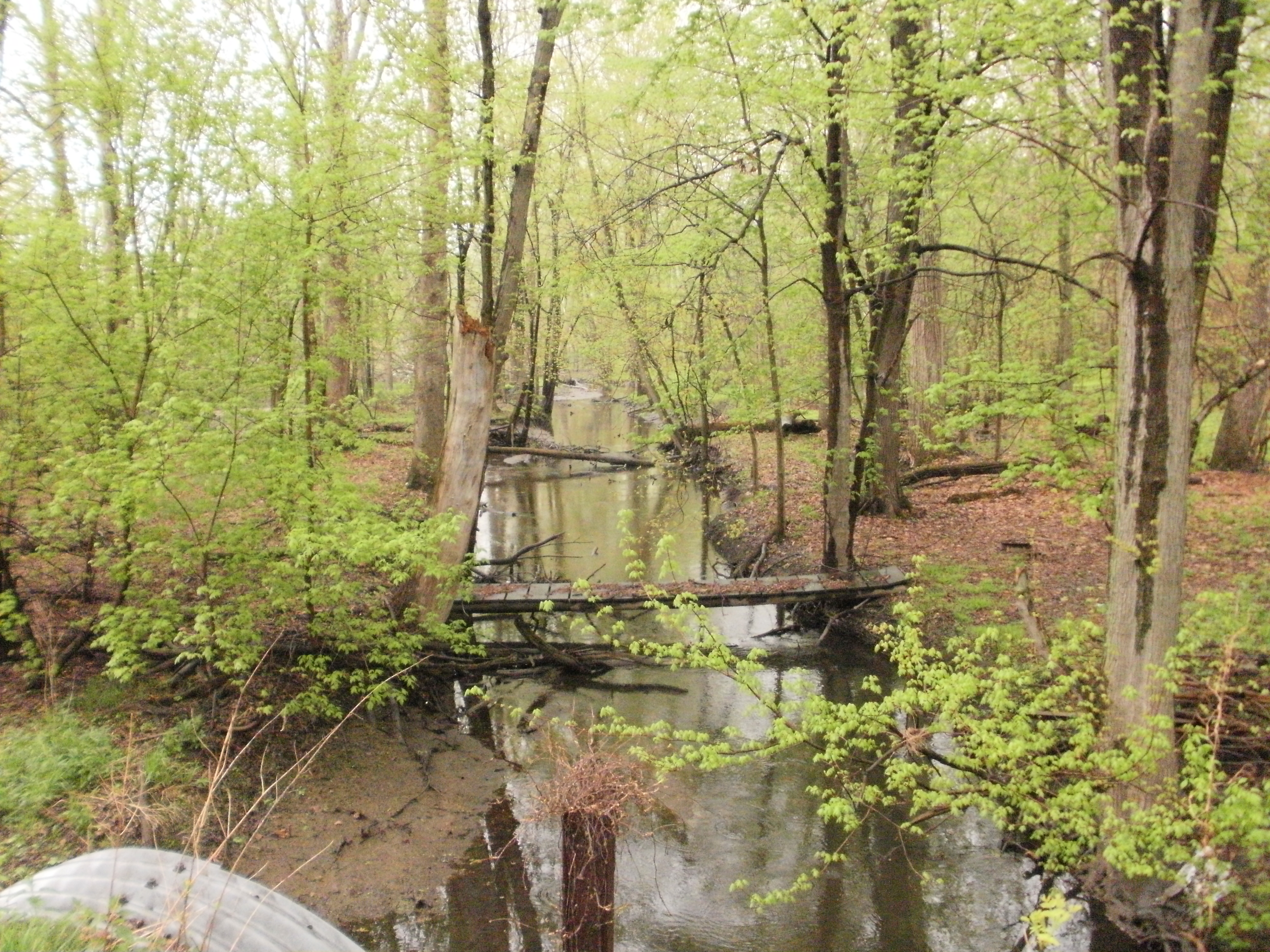
A picture of the creek just northwest of the mouth into the Tippecanoe River near Talma, Indiana.

Redinger Ditch is a creek in northern Indiana that starts near Argos and joins the Tippecanoe River in Talma. Other than those two towns, it is also near Walnut, Tiosa, Tippecanoe, Old Tip Town, Mentone, and Richland Center. It is approximately 770 feet above sea level. Its approximate coordinates are 41°10′50″N 86°10′17″W.

== Physical nature ==
It begins near Argos in south central Marshall County as a very shallow, narrow stream. As it flows along under Indiana State Road 110, it remains extremely shallow, though it widens slightly. As it reaches the Tippecanoe River, it straightens out some and begins to greatly vary in size. On the upstream side of Fulton County Road 650 North, it is about 7 feet across and 1 foot deep. Just on the other side, it is roughly 12 feet across and 3 feet deep. Just roughly 30 feet downstream from this, there's an island about 4 feet across with about 2 feet of whitewater on either side, and on one side the bank's vertical for about a foot. 10 feet later, it joins the Tippecanoe River.

A number of arrowheads and other such Indian artifacts have been found in and nearby the creek, probably from the Potawatamie tribe. The regular flooding of the creek produces very fertile soil, providing nutrition for a large amount of plants, including water mint, sycamore trees, and stinging nettles, among hundreds of others.

== Ecology ==
As a tributary to the Tippecanoe River, rated by the United States Department of Natural Resources as one of the top ten ecologically diverse and important rivers in the United States, it naturally has a wide variety of plant and animal life. These include varieties of mussels, seaweed, minnows, and algae, despite the fact that many areas have a very sandy bottom. The area nearby the creek where it is highly fertile due to yearly flooding has hundreds of species of various trees, bushes, and grasses, and this attracts many animals to the area. As with the rest of the Tippecanoe watershed, there are problems with the zebra mussel, a highly invasive species, though since the creek is not very urbanized, this is not much of a problem.

== See also ==
- List of rivers of Indiana
