= Fletcher =

Fletcher may refer to:

== People and fictional characters ==
- Fletcher (surname), including lists of people and fictional characters
- Fletcher (given name), lists of people and fictional characters
- Fletcher (occupation), a person who fletches arrows, the origin of the surname
- Fletcher (singer), American singer-songwriter Cari Fletcher (born 1994)

== Places ==
=== United States ===
- Fletcher, the original name of Aurora, Colorado, a home rule municipality
- Fletcher, Illinois, an unincorporated community
- Fletcher, Indiana, an unincorporated town
- Fletcher, Missouri, an unincorporated community
- Fletcher, North Carolina, a suburb of Asheville
- Fletcher, Ohio, a village
- Fletcher, Oklahoma, a town
- Fletcher, Vermont, a town
- Fletcher, West Virginia, an unincorporated community
- Fletcher Hills, San Diego County, California, a mountain range
- Fletcher Pond, Michigan, a man-made body of water
- Fletcher Peak, Yosemite National Park, California

=== Antarctica ===
- Fletcher Islands, George V Land
  - Fletcher Island, largest of the Fletcher Islands
- Fletcher Peninsula, Ellsworth Land
- Fletcher Ice Rise

=== Elsewhere ===
- Fletcher, New South Wales, Australia, a suburb of Newcastle
- Fletcher, Ontario, Canada, a farming community
- Fletcher Island (Nunavut), Canada
- Fletcher's Canal, Greater Manchester, England
- 3265 Fletcher, an asteroid

== Aviation ==
- Fletcher Aviation, a US aircraft manufacturer
- PAC Fletcher, a New Zealand agricultural aircraft
- Fletcher Field, a public-use airport in Coahoma County, Mississippi

== Ships ==
- Fletcher class, a type of US Navy destroyer
- USS Fletcher (DD-445), lead ship of the Fletcher class, served during World War II
- USS Fletcher (DD-992), a destroyer

== Education ==
- The Fletcher School of Law and Diplomacy, a graduate school of Tufts University, Medford, Massachusetts
- Duncan U. Fletcher High School, Neptune Beach, Florida, United States
- Fletcher High School, Gweru, Zimbabwe
- Fletcher Hall (Gainesville, Florida), a dormitory building on the campus of the University of Florida

== Other uses ==
- Fletcher Construction, a major New Zealand construction company
- Fletcher baronets, four titles, one of which is still extant
- Fletcher Collection, a collection of British postage stamps in the British Library
- Fletcher (typeface), a geometrically constructed blackletter typeface
- Needlegun or fletcher, a firearm that fires flechettes

== See also ==
- Fletcher's checksum, a checksum used to provide error-detection in computing
