= Felch =

Felch may mean:

- Felching, when semen or other fluids are sucked from the anus
- Alpheus Felch (1804–1896), Governor and U.S. Senator from Michigan
- Felch Township, Michigan, named in honor of Alpheus Felch

== See also ==
- Felchville (disambiguation)
- Fletch (disambiguation)
