= Henry Township, Indiana =

Henry Township is the name of two townships in the U.S. state of Indiana:

- Henry Township, Fulton County, Indiana
- Henry Township, Henry County, Indiana
