= Bert Leedy Round Barn =

- U.S. National Register of Historic Places
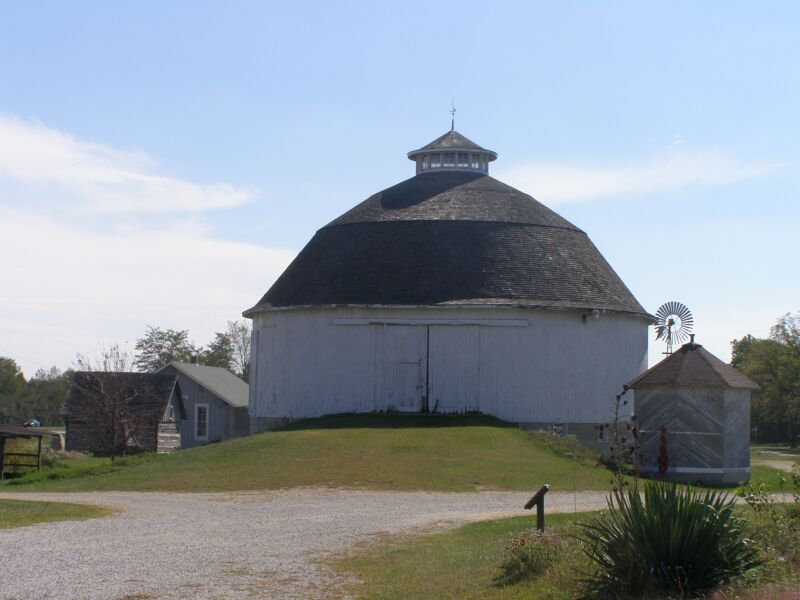
- View from U.S. Route 31

- Location within Indiana Location within the United States
- Location: Southwestern corner of the junction of County Road 375N and U.S. Route 31, north of Rochester, Richland Township, Fulton County, Indiana
- Coordinates: 41°6′28″N 86°14′26″W
- Area: Less than 1 acre (0.40 ha)
- Built: 1924
- Built by: C.V. Kindig
- Architectural style: Round barn
- MPS: Round and Polygonal Barns of Indiana MPS
- NRHP reference No.: 93000182
- Added to NRHP: April 2, 1993

The Bert Leedy Round Barn, also known as Paxton Round Barn and as Fulton County Historical Society Round Barn, is a round barn located in Richland Township near Rochester, Indiana, United States. Built in 1924, it was listed on the National Register of Historic Places in 1993. The listing was consistent with terms of a National Park Service "Multiple Property Documentation" study on "Round and Polygonal Barns of Indiana" that was prepared in 1991. The Round Barn was moved to its current site, an open-air museum, in 1989 after it was struck by a tornado.

The Fulton County Historical Society Museum, a modern building, is located approximately seventy five feet northwest of the barn. Parking for the museum is located northeast of the barn. A large earthen ramp on the north side of the barn leads to the main level entrance.

== Exterior ==
This circular, two-storied barn, constructed in 1924, is topped by a three-pitch gambrel roof that is in turn capped by a round cupola with conical roof. The cupola is composed of windows, which help provide natural light to the main interior level. The main level 's balloon frame structure, original to the barn, rests on the lower level's poured concrete walls. After the barn was moved in 1990 the roof was rebuilt using approximately two-thirds of the original roof materials. The roof surfaces of the barn are covered in wood shingle. Although, some of the materials are new, the original roof was of the same design and construction. The wall surfaces of the main level are sheathed in vertical wood siding painted white while the walls of the lower level are poured concrete.

There were two 2-pitch gambrel barns in Rochester Township built in 1914 and 1915, that survived at the time of a 1991 survey of round barns in the state. Also in the township there had been a 3-pitch gambrel barn built in 1916, but the latter has been lost.

== Interior ==
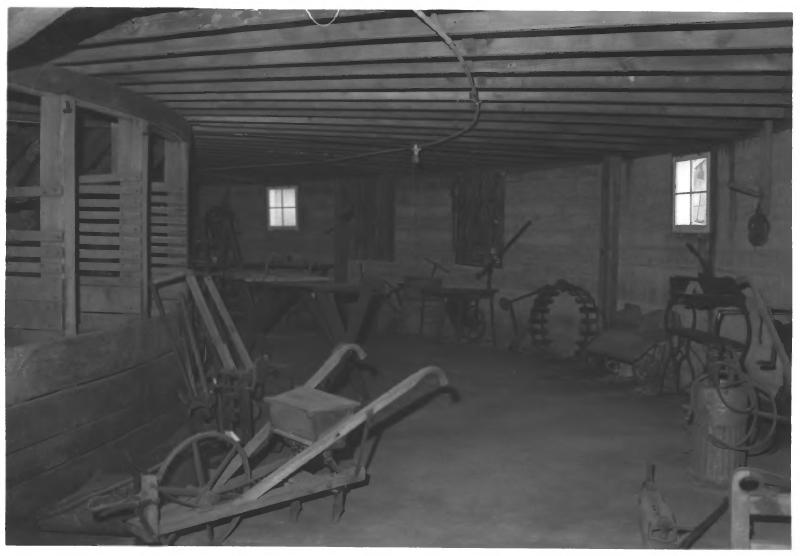
Ground floor of Bert Leedy Round Barn; Fulton County, Indiana

The main doors of vertical wood planks slide along overhead tracks and are curved to conform to the circular form of the barn. A smaller door, located in the left sliding door, permits access without opening the larger entrance. There is another main level door on the east side of the barn, without a ramp.

The lower level, unlike the main floor, contains windows spaced at regular intervals. These windows, inserted in the new foundation at the time that the barn was moved, were taken from the original foundation. The west facing door, located on this level, also slides on an overhead track. On the south side a fire door was added during the recent rehabilitation to satisfy fire codes.

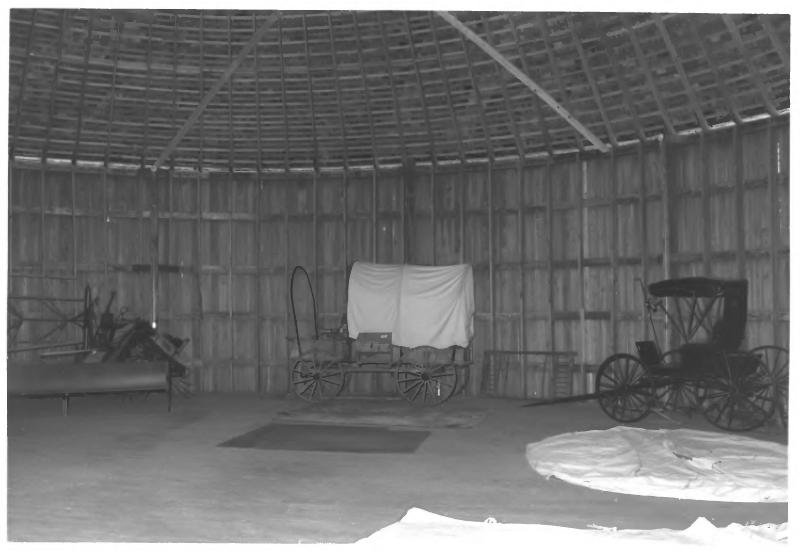
Hay Mow of Bert Leedy Round Barn; Fulton County, Indiana

The lower interior of the barn has a finished concrete floor. Originally farm animals were housed on this level. The space is organized around the central bin/storage/pen area and well lit by the perimeter windows. Laminated beams located above the centralized feed alley are in turn braced by support posts that define the outer edge of the feeding area. Posts run along either side of the central drive. The floor joists of the upper level radiate inwardly from the exterior -walls to the central drive and then run north and south over the central drive. At the center on the south side between the feed alley and central drive are pens with sliding gates. On the north side a set of permanent stairs lead to the upper haymow. The main upper level is relatively dark except for the cupola's windows. A 5 by 5 feet (1.5 by 1.5 m) square grain bin located adjacent to the stairs from the lower level stops short of the roof. The rest of the main level space is open and the balloon framing of the walls and the roof. The roof system is unsupported except for the two laminated beams found at the intersection of the three roof pitches.

== Significance ==
The barn is significant as an outstanding example of the round barn phenomenon that appeared in American farming at the end of the nineteenth and beginning of the early twentieth century. Round barn construction illustrates the application of scientific methods and modern engineering principles to agricultural building construction in order to improve the efficiency and thereby the profitability of the farm.

The barn is an excellent example and the last known example of the work of C. V. Kindig and Sons, the leading round barn builders in northwestern Indiana in the early twentieth century. One of the significant construction improvements that typifies round barns is the use of balloon framing. Without the numerous structural supports found in barns that did not use balloon framing, (typically early polygonal barns), interiors like that of the Leedy Barn could more efficiently accommodate the needs of the farmer. The belief that increased efficiency would improve a farm's profitability was an underlying principle behind the introduction of the centralized barn form.

== Owners ==
The original owner of the barn was Bert Leedy who had lost a barn to fire in September 1924. Leedy consulted with his brother, Ezra, the owner of a round barn, who convinced him that a round barn could be constructed more quickly than a conventional barn and thereby provide shelter for his equipment and livestock before the approaching winter. Bert Leedy contacted C. V. Kindig and Sons. The Kindigs were responsible for most of Fulton County's round barns. The foundation and lower level walls of concrete were poured in just three days. When completed, the lower level sheltered eight horses, thirty sheep, eight cows, eight calves and eight feeder steers. The upper level hay mow accommodated fifty to sixty loads of hay and ten to twelve loads of straw plus a wheat bin with a capacity of thirty bushels.

Bert Leedy retained ownership of the barn and farm until 1972 when he sold out to the Partridge family. Harold and Opal Partridge owned the round barn 1973–75. According to a discussion that the Fulton County Historian had with Partidge at the time, Harold died in the round barn when a lawn mower he was working on caught on fire. He yelled for Opal to bring water so she did and threw it on the mower which put it out but Harold fell over dead with a heart attack. Larry and Patty Paxton owned the round barn from 1975 to 1989. When it was damaged by tornado in 1989, they donated it to Fulton County Historical Society. Paxton offered the barn to the Society on the condition that it be moved. It was moved it to the present site on U.S. 31 beside Fulton County's history museum. The relocation began on November 30 and restoration was finished on June 20, 1990. About 2/3 of the lumber was original old lumber and about 1/3 of the round barn is new lumber. The roof is also new. Fred Carr, local carpenter, rebuilt the round barn 1990–1991. The renovation blue prints were drawn by Eugene Chudzynski, a local engineer and Purdue graduate. The barn was dedicated by the Society on June 22, 1991. The Leedy round barn was again knocked down by tornado or high wind on August 15, 2015, and again rebuilt by the Society. This time an Amish company rebuilt it for the museum.

== Bibliography ==
- Hanou, John. Research compiled on Indiana's round and polygonal barns from 1986 to present. Archived at Historic Landmarks Foundation of Indiana, 340 West Michigan Street, Indianapolis, IN 46202.
- Hood, Doris. Fulton County's Round Barns. Rochester, IN: Fulton County Round Barn Festival, 1971.
- Intensive architectural survey of Indiana's round and polygonal barns, conducted June to August 1991, conducted by Jerry McMahan, area wide survey of round and polygonal architectural and historical resources.
- Soike, Lowell J. Without Right Angles, The Round Barns of Iowa. Des Moines, IA: Iowa State Historical Department, Office of Historic Preservation, 1983.
