= Utter-Gerig Round Barn =

- U.S. National Register of Historic Places
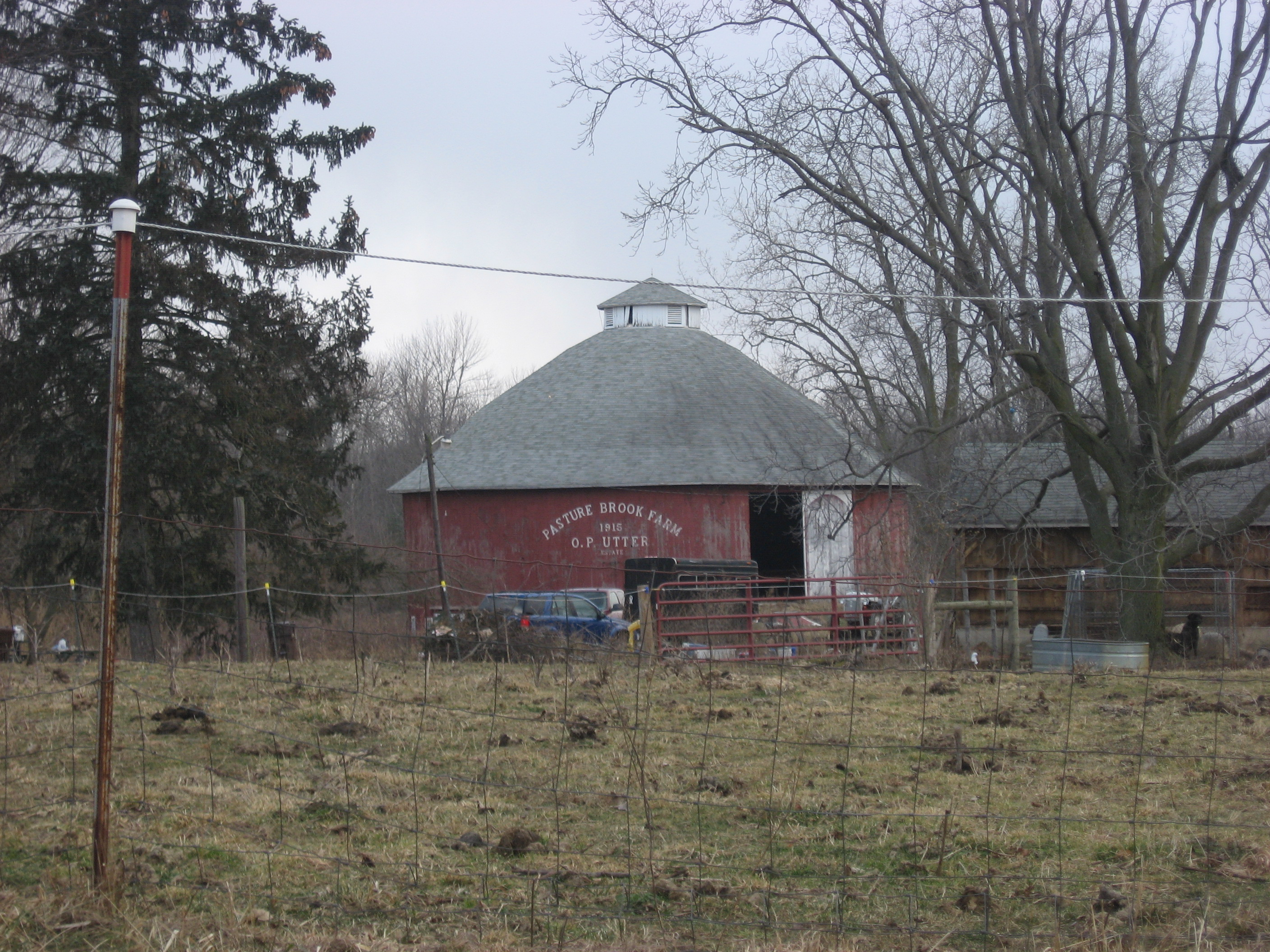
- Roadside view

- Location within Indiana Location within the United States
- Location: Near the junction of County Roads 825E and 100N, northwest of Akron, Henry Township, Fulton County, Indiana
- Coordinates: 41°3′52″N 86°5′32″W
- Area: less than one acre
- Built: 1915
- Built by: Rhodes, Courtney & Sumner
- Architectural style: Round barn
- NRHP reference No.: 90001927
- Added to NRHP: December 18, 1990

The Utter-Gerig Round Barn is a round barn located in Henry Township near Akron, Indiana. It was built in 1915, and is a wood frame barn measuring approximately 63 feet in diameter. It rests on a fieldstone foundation and has two primary floors. The second level is reached by a broad earth ramp.

It was listed on the National Register of Historic Places in 1990.
