= Richland Center =

Richland Center is the name of several places in the United States:

- Richland Center, Indiana
- Richland Center, Wisconsin
- Richland Center Township
