= Wayne Township, Fulton County, Indiana =

Wayne Township
- Township
- Location of Wayne Township in Fulton County
- Coordinates: 40°57′11″N 86°23′41″W
- Country: United States
- State: Indiana
- County: Fulton

Government
  - Type: Indiana township

Area
  - Total: 46.82 sq mi (121.3 km^{2})
  - Land: 46.74 sq mi (121.1 km^{2})
  - Water: 0.07 sq mi (0.18 km^{2})
- Elevation: 774 ft (236 m)

Population (2020)
  - Total: 545
  - Density: 12.2/sq mi (4.7/km^{2})
- FIPS code: 18-81692
- GNIS feature ID: 454029

Wayne Township is one of eight townships in Fulton County, Indiana. As of the 2020 census, its population was 545 (down from 569 at 2010) and it contained 242 housing units.

== Geography ==
According to the 2010 census, the township has a total area of 46.82 square miles (121.3 km^{2}), of which 46.74 square miles (121.1 km^{2}) (or 99.83%) is land and 0.07 square miles (0.18 km^{2}) (or 0.15%) is water.

=== Unincorporated towns ===
- Fletcher
- Grass Creek
- Marshtown

(This list is based on USGS data and may include former settlements.)

=== Adjacent townships ===
- Union Township (north)
- Rochester Township (northeast)
- Liberty Township (east)
- Bethlehem Township, Cass County (southeast)
- Harrison Township, Cass County (south)
- Boone Township, Cass County (southwest)
- Van Buren Township, Pulaski County (west)
- Harrison Township, Pulaski County (northwest)

=== Major highways ===
- Indiana State Road 17
- Indiana State Road 114

=== Cemeteries ===
The township contains eight cemeteries: Reed, Fletcher's Lake, Grass Creek, St. Anne, Bauman, Old Allison Farm, Hizer, Old A. D. Toner
