= Prill School =

- U.S. National Register of Historic Places
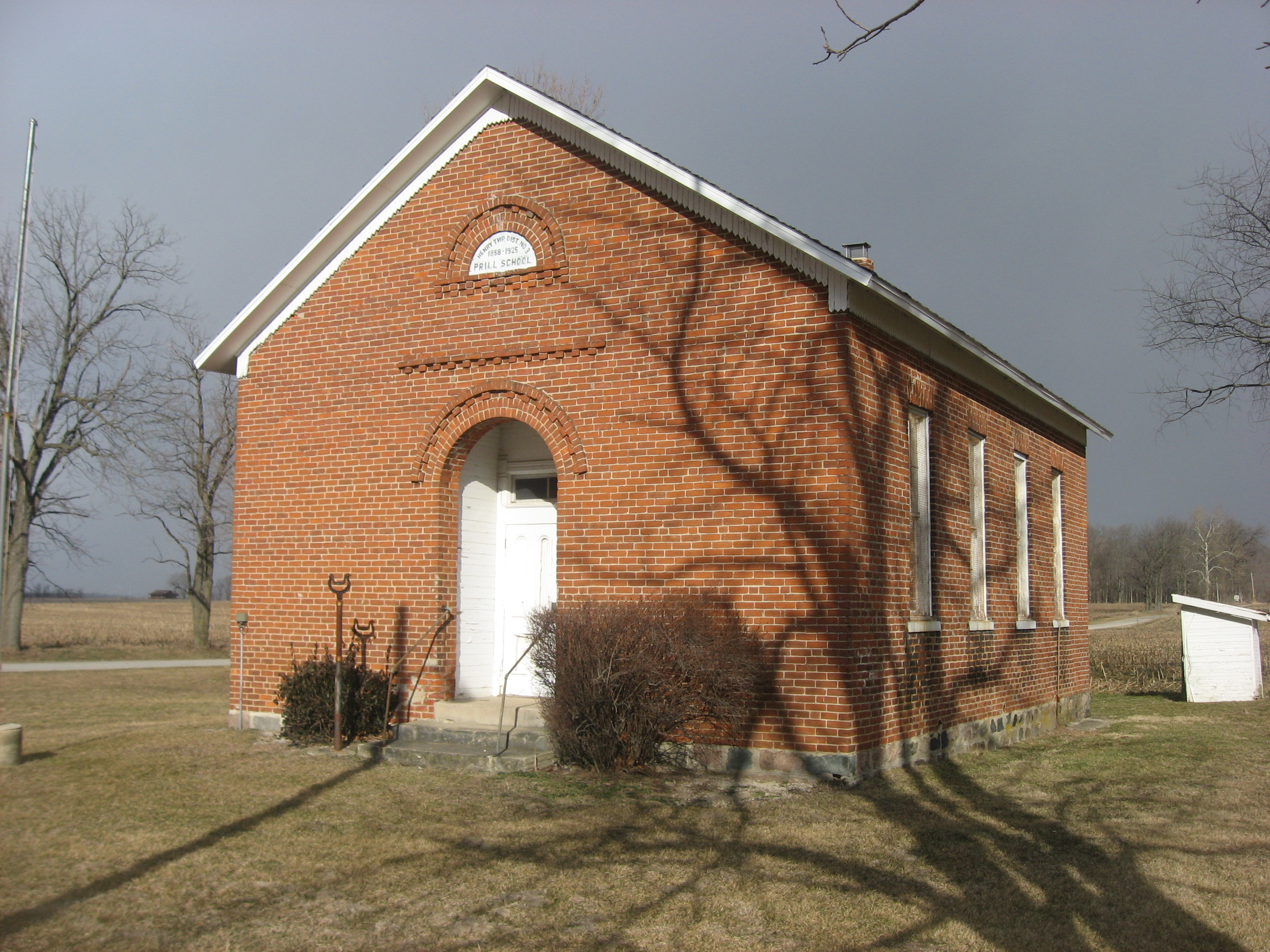
- Prill School, January 2013

- Location within Indiana Location within the United States
- Location: Northwest of Akron, Henry Township, Fulton County, Indiana
- Coordinates: 41°4′35″N 86°6′49″W
- Area: less than one acre
- Built: 1876
- NRHP reference No.: 81000012
- Added to NRHP: December 10, 1981

Prill School, also known as the Prill School Museum, is a historic one-room school building located in Henry Township near Akron, Indiana. It was built in 1876, and is a one-story, rectangular, red brick building topped by a slate gable roof. The Prill School closed in 1925. The school was restored in 1971 by a group of local citizens and opened to visitors as a museum.

It was listed on the National Register of Historic Places in 1981.
