= Talma, Indiana =

- Unincorporated community
- Location within Indiana Location within the United States
- Coordinates: 41°09′09″N 86°08′17″W
- Country: United States
- State: Indiana
- County: Fulton
- Township: Newcastle
- Bloomingsburg (later changed to Talma): June 13, 1851 (name changed on January 15, 1896)
- Founded by: Asa Coplen
- Named after: A word in a crossword puzzle
- Elevation: 774 ft (236 m)
- Time zone: Eastern
- ZIP code: 46975
- Area code: 574
- FIPS code: 18-74870
- GNIS feature ID: 2830384

Talma is an unincorporated community in Newcastle Township, Fulton County, Indiana.

== Geography and history ==
Talma is located where Redinger Ditch meets the Tippecanoe River. Indiana State Road 25 passes northeast through Talma, which is located about halfway between Rochester and Mentone.

The town was founded by Asa Coplen on June 13, 1851, and was named "Bloomingsburg". A petition was later filed to change the name because the United States Post Office wanted a shorter name for it. A local contest was held, and William Roundtree Kubley found the winning entry, Talma, in a crossword puzzle.

Talma was severely damaged by a tornado on April 3, 1974. This shut down the high school that was slated to be consolidated into Tippecanoe Valley High School later that year.

== Economy ==
Talma was home to Talma Fasteners, a manufacturer of screws and bolts and was certified by ISO 9001: 2000. The plant closed in 2014. There is also Mennonite-run Ramer's Hardwood Furniture, Sunnybrook Greenhouses, Snipes Farms, HH Diesel and OBS creative services. Most residents work in Rochester, Argos, or Mentone.

== Demographics ==
Historical population
Census	Pop.	Note	%±
2023 (est.)	154

The United States Census Bureau defined Talma as a census designated place in the 2022 American Community Survey.

== Sources ==
- Fulton County Historical Society
