= Liberty Township, Fulton County, Indiana =

Liberty Township
- Township
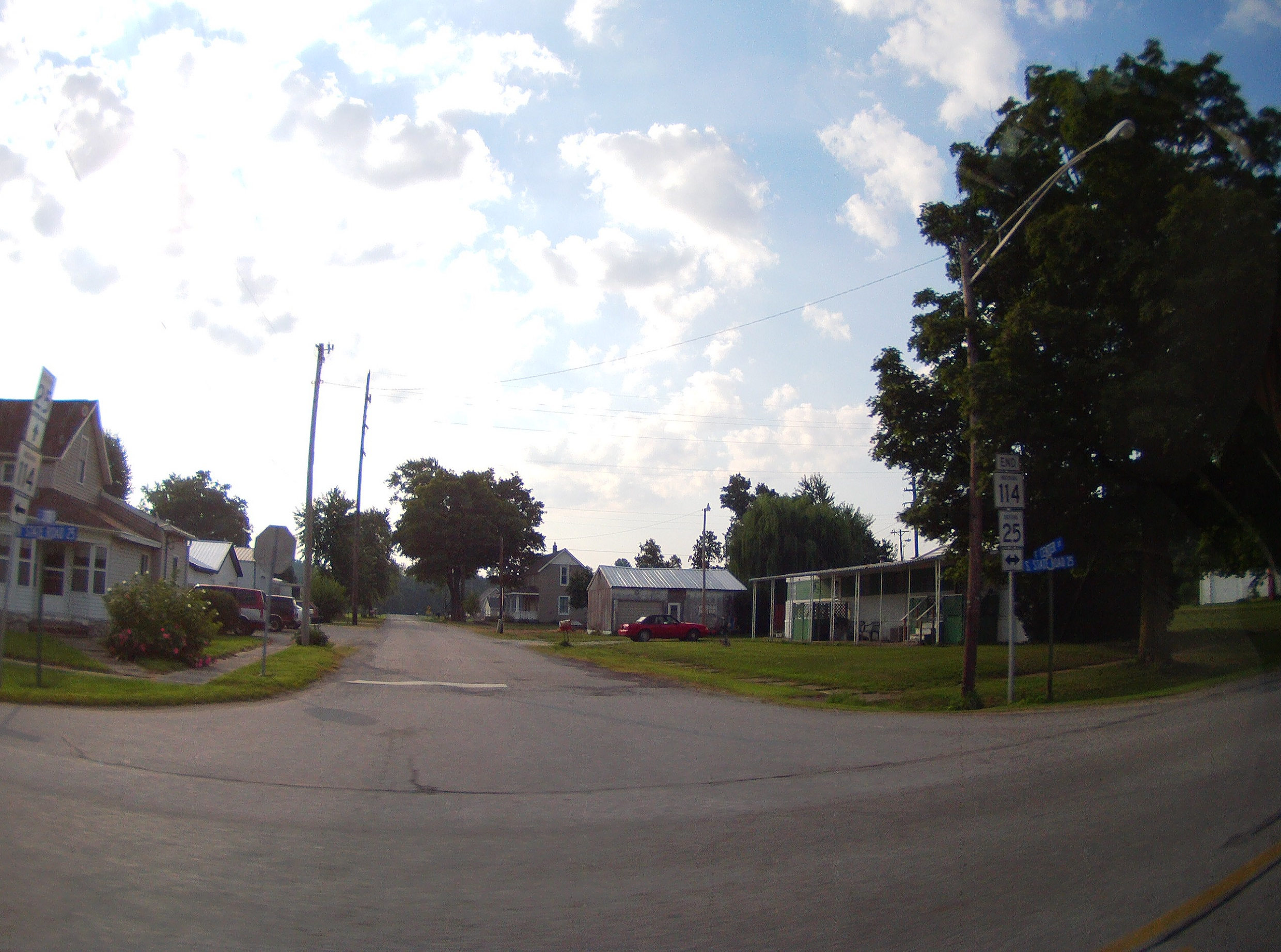
- Intersection of Highway 25 and Center Street in Fulton

- Location of Liberty Township in Fulton County
- Coordinates: 40°57′07″N 86°14′57″W
- Country: United States
- State: Indiana
- County: Fulton

Government
  - Type: Indiana township

Area
  - Total: 47.24 sq mi (122.4 km^{2})
  - Land: 46.91 sq mi (121.5 km^{2})
  - Water: 0.33 sq mi (0.85 km^{2})
- Elevation: 794 ft (242 m)

Population (2020)
  - Total: 1,540
  - Density: 34.4/sq mi (13.3/km^{2})
- FIPS code: 18-43254
- GNIS feature ID: 453553

Liberty Township is one of eight townships in Fulton County, Indiana. As of the 2020 census, its population was 1,540 (down from 1,614 at 2010) and it contained 851 housing units.

== Geography ==
According to the 2010 census, the township has a total area of 47.24 square miles (122.4 km^{2}), of which 46.91 square miles (121.5 km^{2}) (or 99.30%) is land and 0.33 square miles (0.85 km^{2}) (or 0.70%) is water.

=== Cities and towns ===
- Fulton

=== Adjacent townships ===
- Rochester Township (north)
- Allen Township, Miami County (east)
- Union Township, Miami County (southeast)
- Adams Township, Cass County (south)
- Bethlehem Township, Cass County (southwest)
- Wayne Township (west)

=== Major highways ===
- Indiana State Road 25
- Indiana State Road 114

=== Cemeteries ===
The township contains three cemeteries: Fulton, Mount Olive and Salem.
