= Aubbeenaubbee Township, Fulton County, Indiana =

Aubbeenaubbee Township
- Township
- Location of Aubbeenaubbee Township in Fulton County
- Coordinates: 41°09′00″N 86°25′00″W
- Country: United States
- State: Indiana
- County: Fulton

Government
  - Type: Indiana township

Area
  - Total: 34.69 sq mi (89.8 km^{2})
  - Land: 34.49 sq mi (89.3 km^{2})
  - Water: 0.2 sq mi (0.52 km^{2})
- Elevation: 741 ft (226 m)

Population (2020)
  - Total: 1,346
  - Density: 42/sq mi (16/km^{2})
- FIPS code: 18-02656
- GNIS feature ID: 453053

Aubbeenaubbee Township is one of eight townships in Fulton County, Indiana. As of the 2020 census, its population was 1,346 (down from 1,448 at 2010) and it contained 624 housing units.

== Geography ==
According to the 2010 census, the township has a total area of 34.69 square miles (89.8 km^{2}), of which 34.49 square miles (89.3 km^{2}) (or 99.42%) is land and 0.2 square miles (0.52 km^{2}) (or 0.58%) is water. King Lake is in this township.

=== Unincorporated towns ===
- Delong
- Leiters Ford

(This list is based on USGS data and may include former settlements.)

=== Adjacent townships ===
- Union Township, Marshall County (north)
- Richland Township (east)
- Rochester Township (southeast)
- Union Township (south)
- Harrison Township, Pulaski County (southwest)
- Tippecanoe Township, Pulaski County (west)
- North Bend Township, Starke County (northwest)

=== Major highways ===
- Indiana State Road 17
- Indiana State Road 110
- Indiana State Road 117

=== Cemeteries ===
The township contains two cemeteries: Independent Order of Odd Fellows and Moon.
