= Richland Township, Fulton County, Indiana =

Richland Township
- Township
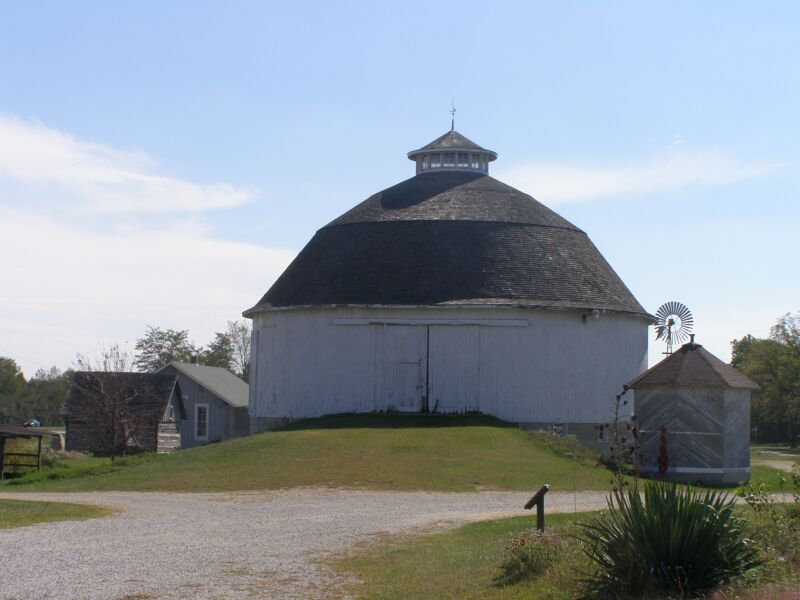
- The Bert Leedy Round Barn, a historic site in the township

- Location of Richland Township in Fulton County
- Coordinates: 41°08′06″N 86°16′13″W
- Country: United States
- State: Indiana
- County: Fulton

Government
  - Type: Indiana township

Area
  - Total: 37.6 sq mi (97 km^{2})
  - Land: 37.48 sq mi (97.1 km^{2})
  - Water: 0.12 sq mi (0.31 km^{2})
- Elevation: 843 ft (257 m)

Population (2020)
  - Total: 1,127
  - Density: 31.5/sq mi (12.2/km^{2})
- FIPS code: 18-64044
- GNIS feature ID: 453792

Richland Township is one of eight townships in Fulton County, Indiana. As of the 2020 census, its population was 1,127 (down from 1,181 at 2010) and it contained 458 housing units.

== History ==
The Bert Leedy Round Barn was listed on the National Register of Historic Places in 1993.

== Geography ==
According to the 2010 census, the township has a total area of 37.6 square miles (97 km^{2}), of which 37.48 square miles (97.1 km^{2}) (or 99.68%) is land and 0.12 square miles (0.31 km^{2}) (or 0.32%) is water.

=== Unincorporated towns ===
- Richland Center
- Tiosa

=== Adjacent townships ===
- Green Township, Marshall County (north)
- Walnut Township, Marshall County (northeast)
- Newcastle Township (east)
- Rochester Township (south)
- Aubbeenaubbee Township (west)
- Union Township, Marshall County (northwest)

=== Major highways ===
- U.S. Route 31
- State Road 110

=== Cemeteries ===
The township contains one cemetery, Sand Hill.
