= Newcastle Township, Fulton County, Indiana =

Newcastle Township
- Township
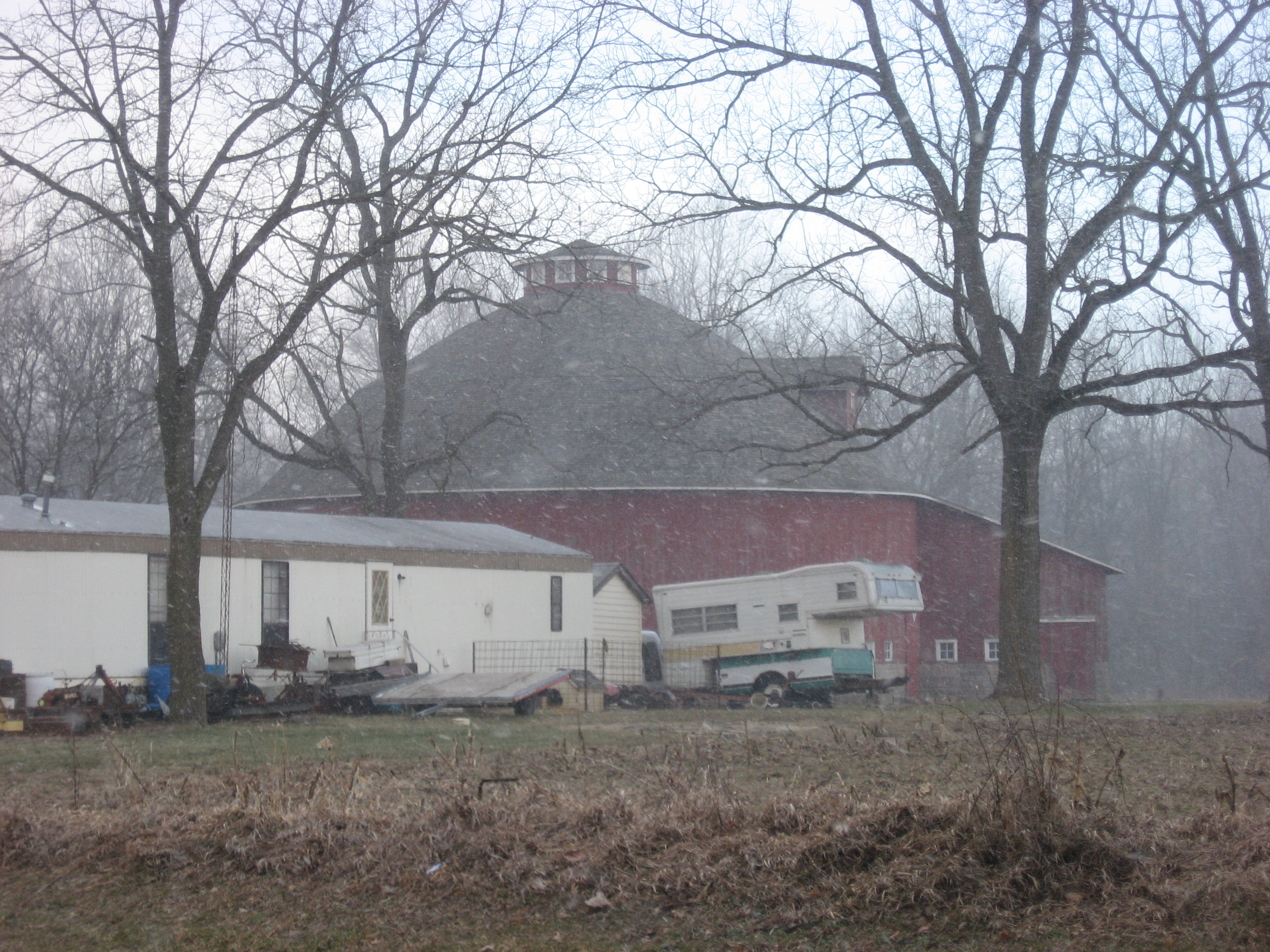
- A round barn in the township

- Location of Newcastle Township in Fulton County
- Coordinates: 41°07′40″N 86°07′46″W
- Country: United States
- State: Indiana
- County: Fulton

Government
  - Type: Indiana township

Area
  - Total: 33.26 sq mi (86.1 km^{2})
  - Land: 33.19 sq mi (86.0 km^{2})
  - Water: 0.08 sq mi (0.21 km^{2})
- Elevation: 781 ft (238 m)

Population (2020)
  - Total: 1,390
  - Density: 42.1/sq mi (16.3/km^{2})
- FIPS code: 18-52722
- GNIS feature ID: 453662

Newcastle Township is one of eight townships in Fulton County, Indiana. As of the 2020 census, its population was 1,390 (slightly down from 1,398 at 2010) and it contained 552 housing units.

== History ==
The John Haimbaugh Round Barn was listed on the National Register of Historic Places in 1993.

== Geography ==
According to the 2010 census, the township has a total area of 33.26 square miles (86.1 km^{2}), of which 33.19 square miles (86.0 km^{2}) (or 99.79%) is land and 0.08 square miles (0.21 km^{2}) (or 0.24%) is water. Barr Lake is in this township.

=== Unincorporated towns ===
- Talma

=== Adjacent townships ===
- Tippecanoe Township, Marshall County (north)
- Franklin Township, Kosciusko County (east)
- Henry Township (southeast)
- Rochester Township (southwest)
- Richland Township (west)
- Walnut Township, Marshall County (northwest)

=== Major highways ===
- Indiana State Road 25
- Indiana State Road 110
- Indiana State Road 331

=== Cemeteries ===
The township contains four cemeteries: Hamlett, Reister, Sycamore and Yellow Creek.
