= Fletch =

Fletch may refer to:

- Fletch (archery), the individual materials, such as feathers, that provide aerodynamic stabilization in arrows or darts
- Adrian "Fletch" Fletcher, a fictional character in British medical dramas Casualty and Holby City
- Andy Fletcher (musician), nicknamed "Fletch", a member of the band Depeche Mode
- Fletch (novel), the first book in a series of books by Gregory Mcdonald featuring the character Irwin Maurice Fletcher
  - Fletch (film), a 1985 comedy starring Chevy Chase, based on the novel
- Fletch (Hollyoaks), a fictional character from British soap opera Hollyoaks
- Norman Stanley Fletcher, nicknamed "Fletch", the lead character in the British sitcom Porridge
- Fletch & Vaughan, the weekday drive show of New Zealand's The Edge radio station with co-host Carl "Fletch" Fletcher
- A nickname given to a person whose surname is Fletcher

== See also ==
- Fletcher (disambiguation)
