= Delong, Indiana =

- Unincorporated community
- Location within Indiana Location within the United States
- Coordinates: 41°08′18″N 86°24′59″W
- Country: United States
- State: Indiana
- County: Fulton
- Township: Aubbeenaubbee
- Elevation: 738 ft (225 m)
- ZIP code = 46922: 46975
- FIPS code: 18-17578
- GNIS feature ID: 433458

Delong is an unincorporated community in Aubbeenaubbee Township, Fulton County, Indiana.

== History ==
Delong was originally called Marshland, and under the latter name was platted in 1884.
