= Athens, Indiana =

- Unincorporated community
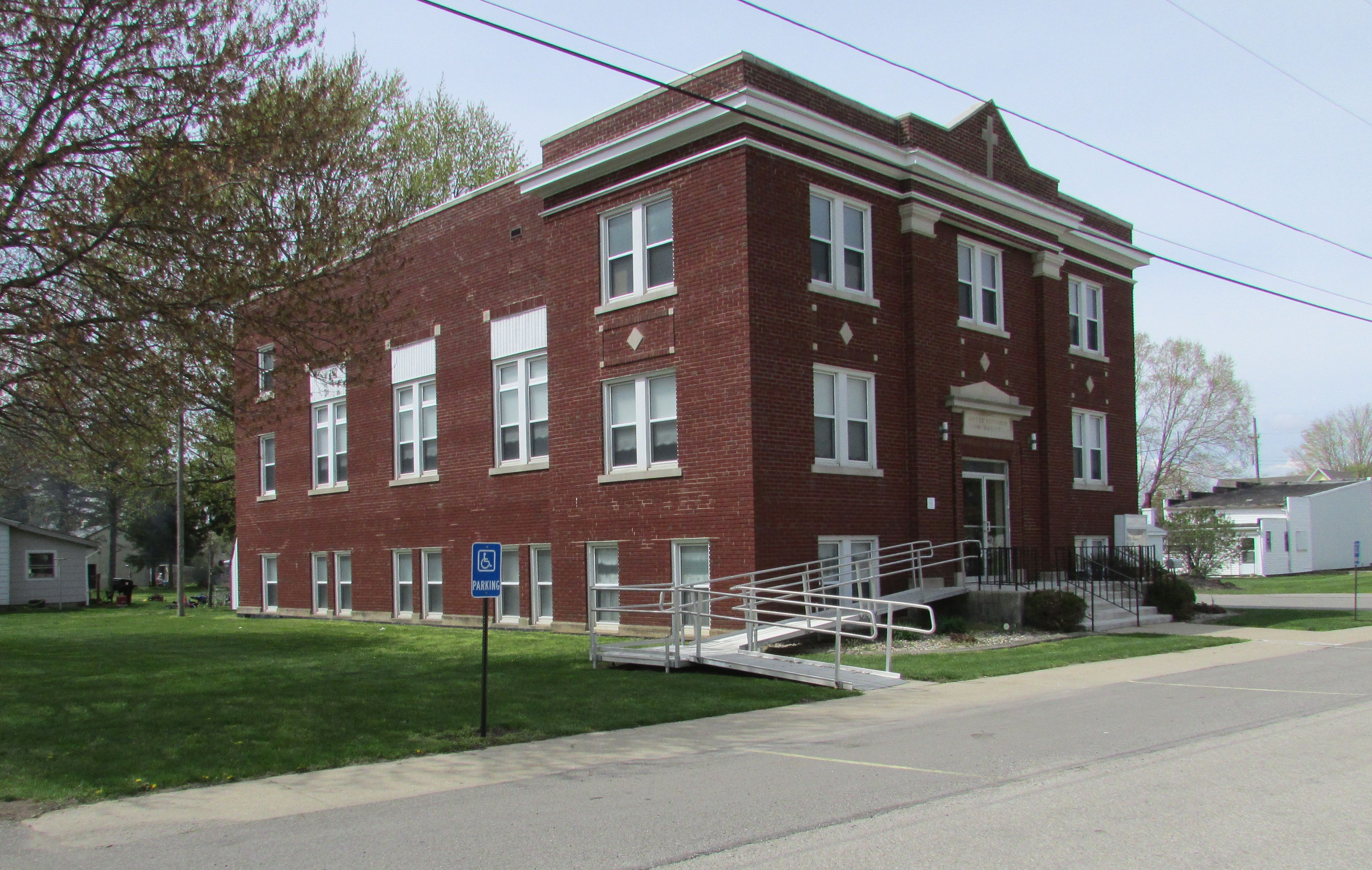
- Community Church of Athens in the old United Brethren in Christ Building

- Location within Indiana Location within the United States
- Coordinates: 41°03′14″N 86°07′27″W
- Country: United States
- State: Indiana
- County: Fulton
- Township: Henry
- Elevation: 807 ft (246 m)
- ZIP code: 46912
- FIPS code: 18-02530
- GNIS feature ID: 430320

Athens (/ˈeɪθənz/) is an unincorporated community hamlet in Henry Township, Fulton County, Indiana, originally called Hoover Station. A post office established as Grant, on December 20, 1875, was moved to Hoover Station in 1883; Hoover Station was a waystation for the Chicago and Atlantic Railway, where Jacob Hoover was the postmaster and kept a general store with his brother. Jacob was the son of Henry and Sarah (Curtis)Hoover, the first white settlers of this area. The name was changed to Athens on May 28, 1896, for Athens, Greece.

While the town is slowly being incorporated into Rochester, a tiny post office exists there for the few remaining residents who still have an Athens address.

== Geography ==
Athens is located six miles east of Rochester along Indiana State Road 14.
