= John Haimbaugh Round Barn =

Historic building in Indiana, US

- U.S. National Register of Historic Places
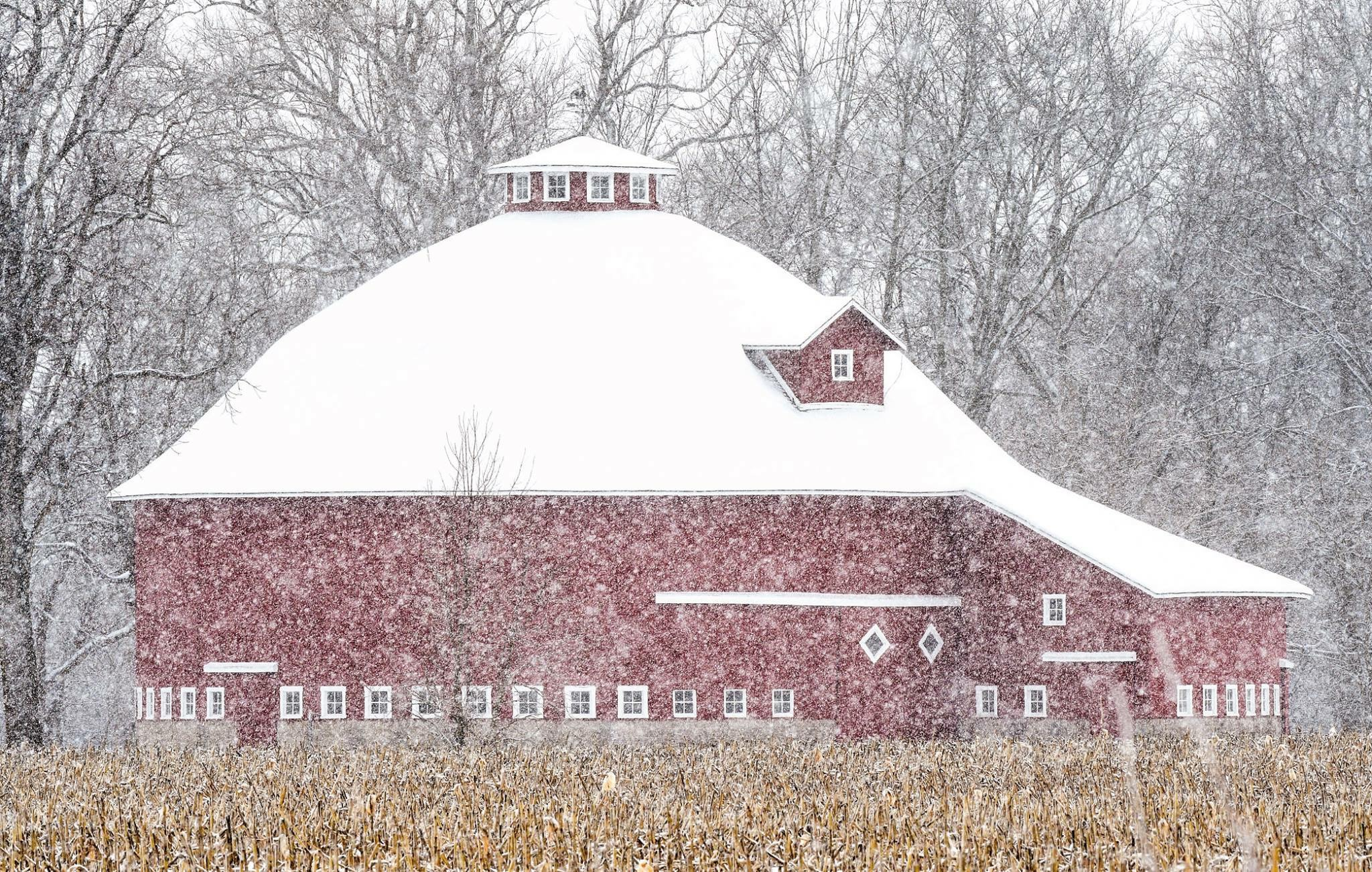
- Seen with snow falling around

- Location within Indiana Location within the United States
- Location: Junction of State Road 25 and County Road 400N, northeast of Rochester, Newcastle Township, Fulton County, Indiana
- Coordinates: 41°6′46″N 86°11′11″W
- Area: less than one acre
- Built: 1914
- Built by: Vernon Kindig
- Architectural style: True-circular barn
- MPS: Round and Polygonal Barns of Indiana MPS
- NRHP reference No.: 93000192
- Added to NRHP: April 2, 1993

The John Haimbaugh Round Barn in Newcastle Township near Rochester, Indiana, United States, is a round barn that was built in 1914. It was listed on the National Register of Historic Places in 1993.

There was another 2-pitch gambrel barn in Rochester Township, built in 1915, that was still extant at the time of a 1991 survey of round barns in the state. Also in the township there had been a 3-pitch gambrel barn built in 1916, but the latter has been lost. Brothers Vernon, Oral, and Hap Kindig built the barn in 1914 for Mr. Haimbaugh. It stands on the west side of Indiana 25. The barn is surrounded by mature trees with cultivated fields on the north and west.

== Exterior ==
The 72-foot (22 m) diameter circle is two-story structure, surrounded on the northwest by a 20-foot (6.1 m) semi-circular one story shed. The roof is a three-pitch gambrel with a dormer on the northeast. In lieu of a cupola, it has a metal aerator. The shed is covered by a gently sloping roof. The balloon framing of the walls rest on tall (about four feet tall) concrete block walls, which in turn rest on poured concrete foundations. Gravel from the farm was used in making the poured concrete. Legend has it that Mr. Haimbaugh insisted on filling the block walls with poured concrete as well, in order to insure stability. The block walls still show no signs of failure. The original wooden shingles have been replaced by asphalt shingles. The roof has modest eaves with exposed rafters. Exterior frame walls are sheathed in vertical wood siding. Simple boards are used to frame door and window openings.

The front is to the northeast. It has large sliding doors mounted on overhead tracks. The doors are vertical planks with an applied diamond panel decoration. The northwest side has a small human-sized door, allowing access without opening the large doors. A dormer is above the door. There are ten windows around each side of the barn from the main doors with another smaller door on the southeast side. There are no upper-level windows on the front. A shed juts out from the rear of the barn with two windows and a single, upper-level window centered between the lower two. The shed has a series of ten windows, followed by a door and then another set of ten windows.

== Interior ==
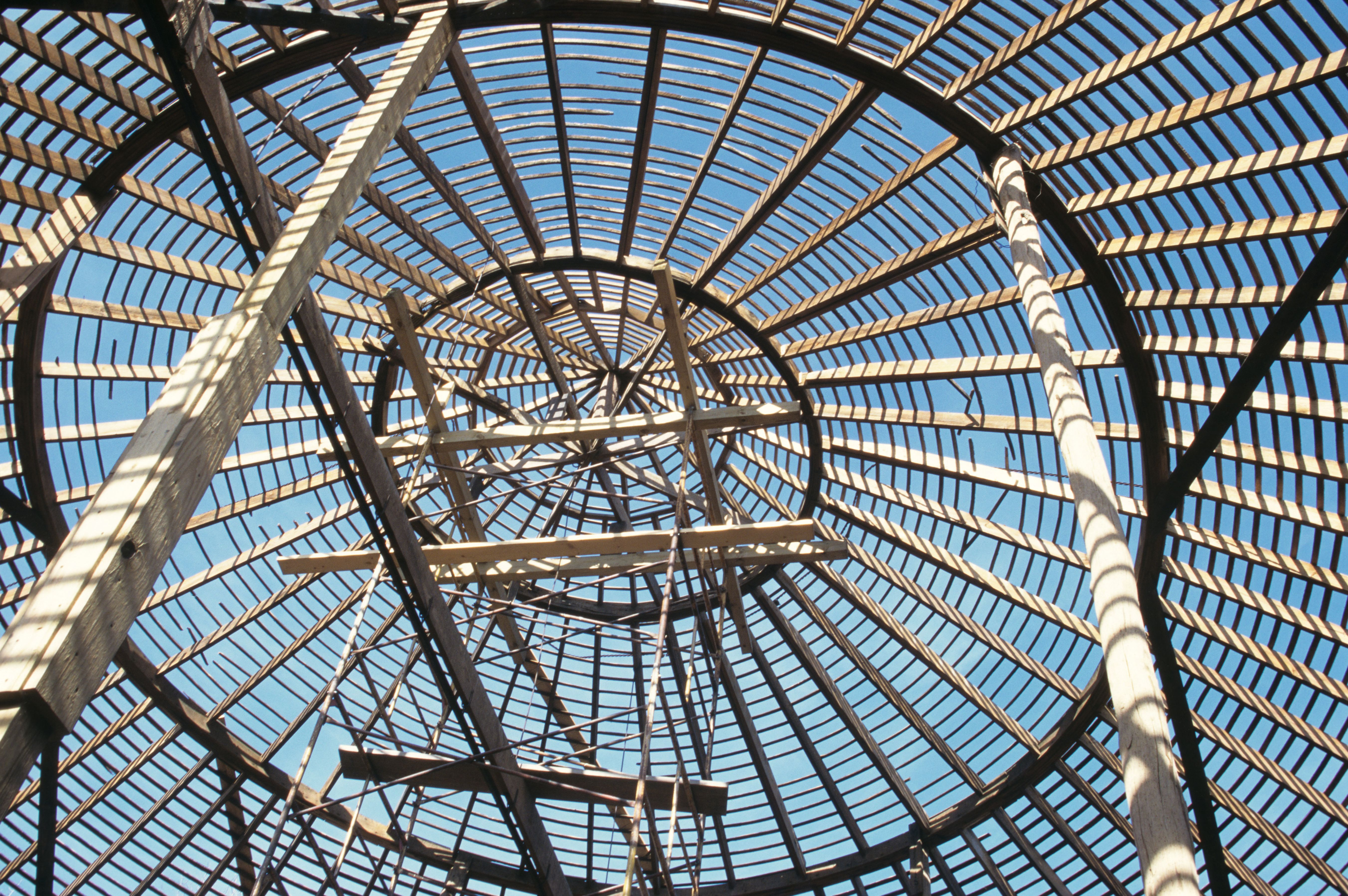
John Haimbaugh Round Barn

The interior of the barn is a composition of spaces arranged to facilitated the dairy operation. There is a central drive that runs from the main doors on the northeast and southwest. On either side of the main drive are feed alleys that are created by the central posts and a concrete feed trough, which forms a circle some 40 feet (12 m) in diameter. On the east side, a concrete trough is followed by a ring of support posts that brace a laminated beam above which helps to carry the weight of the floor joists. Stanchions for the milk herd are fitted between the posts, followed by a manure alley along the outer perimeter. The west side has a similar arrangement but there is a corncrib built into the middle of the feed alley. Finally, along the outer reaches of the west side, there are openings into the attached shed where pens could accommodate the storage of animals.

The upper level, reached by a moveable ladder. The roofing system is an elaborate series of laminated beams and support posts that brace the three roof sections and the dormer. There is an upper laminated beam at the base of the metal aerator section that is braced by a series of cross-timbers that form a web of support. A circular hay track is mounted inside of this beam and it curves gracefully into the dormer thus allowing for efficient handling of hay and straw inside of the main doors. The roof trusses are then composed of balloon frame stick lumber pieces that radiate upwards toward the barn's center. The floor area of the upper level is open, with the exception of the area just inside of the northeast doors which is left open to accommodate loading and unloading of upper level feed.

== Significance ==
It is associated with the development of agriculture in Indiana. The Haimbaugh Barn was built by locally prominent carpenters C.V. Kindig & Sons and features an unusual semi-circular attached shed section. The barn is an important and direct link to the agricultural development that occurred in Indiana from 1850 to 1936 and has changed very little since its construction in 1914. The period of greatest significance of the barn was from 1914 to 1936.

The Haimbaugh barn is quite unusual and unique among Indiana examples. Being one of the 77 remaining true circular barns of the 151 that were built (219 round and polygonal barns were built in Indiana). The barn is unique with the 20-foot (6.1 m)-deep shed that wraps halfway around the barn. Only one other Indiana example has this type of shed that was integral to the original design, the Dr. Horace Jones barn of Madison County's Boone Township. Furthermore, the decorative qualities of the barn and the attention to detail distinguish it from other examples, from its white trim to the diamond trimmed openings to the quarry-faced concrete block base. The Haimbaugh round barn has all of the essential features that were present at the time of its period of significance, from 1911 to the mid-1930s.

== Owners ==
The original owner of the barn was John Haimbaugh who commissioned prominent Fulton County builders C.V. Kindig & Sons to erect the barn. Haimbaugh operated a dairy for which the barn seemed ideal. Timber was harvested from the farm and processed at the nearby Talma sawmill. Gravel for the concrete was mined from a nearby creek. After completion, there were 38 milking stations around the lower level and numerous windows providing ample light to the interior. The Haimbaugh family has always maintained ownership of the barn. The Haimbaugh Family Trust is the current owner. The trust was established for the maintenance of the barn.

== Bibliography ==
- Hanou, John. Research compiled on Indiana's round and polygonal barns from 1986 to present. Archived at Historic Landmarks Foundation of Indiana, 340 West Michigan Street, Indianapolis, IN 46202.
- Hood, Doris. Fulton County's Round Barns. Rochester, IN: Fulton County Round Barn hestival, 1971.
- Intensive architectural survey of Indiana's round and polygonal barns. Conducted June to August 1991, conducted by Jerry McMahan, area wide survey of round and polygonal architectural and historical resources.
- Soike, Lowell J.; Without Right Angles, The Round Barns of Iowa. Des Moines, IA: Iowa State Historical Department, Office of Historic Preservation, 1983.
