= Leiters Ford, Indiana =

- Unincorporated community and Census-designated place
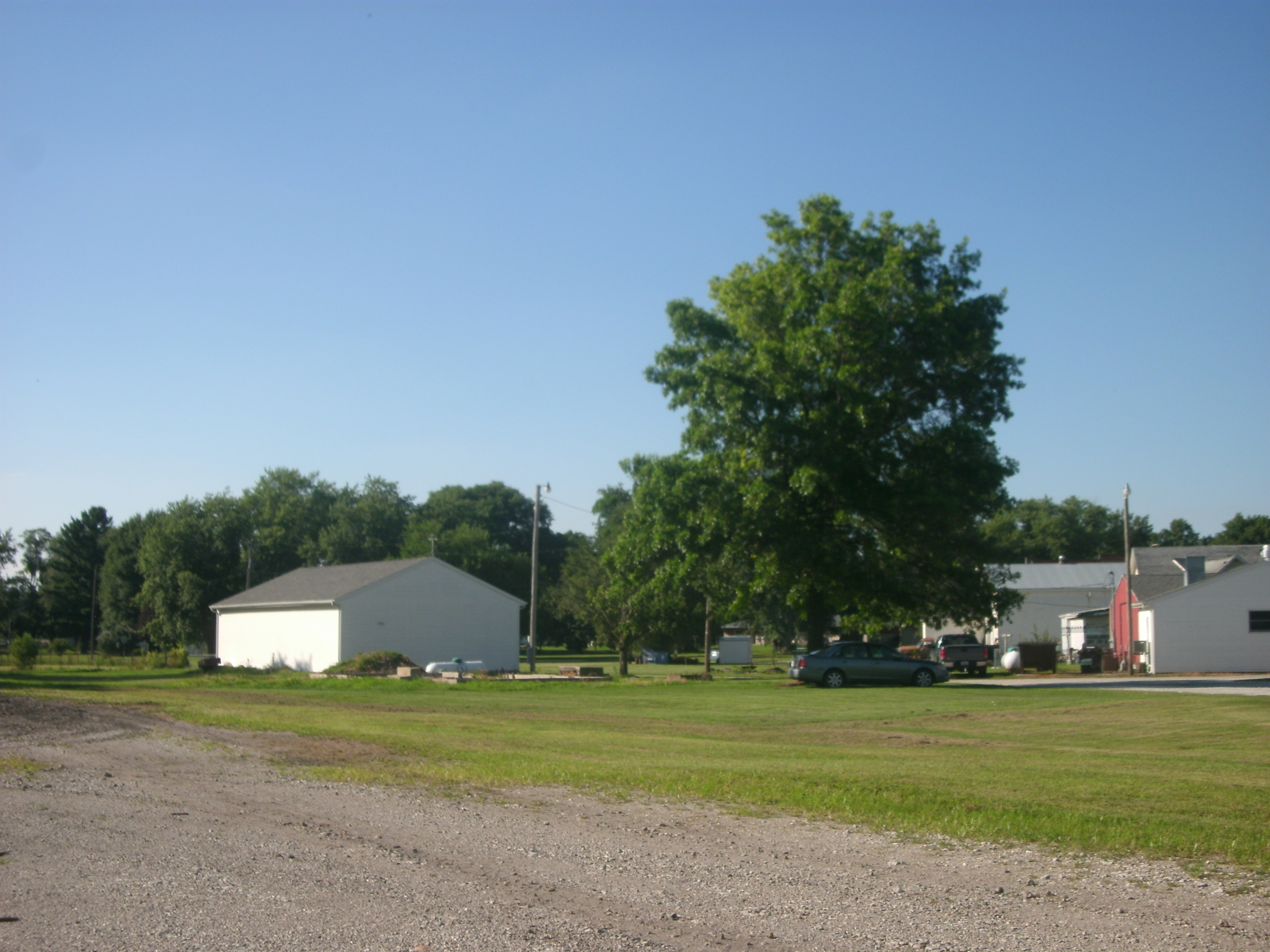
- The site of the former Erie Railroad depot site in Leiters Ford

- Location within Indiana Location within the United States
- Coordinates: 41°07′24″N 86°22′57″W
- Country: United States
- State: Indiana
- County: Fulton
- Township: Aubbeenaubbee
- Elevation: 742 ft (226 m)
- ZIP code: 46945
- FIPS code: 18-42822
- GNIS feature ID: 2830382

Leiters Ford is an unincorporated community in Aubbeenaubbee Township, Fulton County, Indiana.

== History ==
Leiters Ford, located at a ford on the Tippecanoe River, was named for John Leiter, an original owner of the town site. The Leiters Ford post office was established in 1873.

== Demographics ==
The United States Census Bureau delineated Leiters Ford as a census designated place in the 2022 American Community Survey.
