= Grass Creek, Indiana =

- Unincorporated community
- Location within Indiana Location within the United States
- Coordinates: 40°56′51″N 86°24′16″W
- Country: United States
- State: Indiana
- County: Fulton
- Township: Wayne
- Elevation: 768 ft (234 m)
- ZIP code: 46939
- FIPS code: 18-28962
- GNIS feature ID: 435336

Grass Creek is an unincorporated community in Wayne Township, Fulton County, Indiana, United States.

== History ==
Grass Creek was so named from its location at the Grassy Creek. The community contained a post office from 1884 until 1964.
