= Marshtown, Indiana =

Unincorporated community in the United States

Coordinates: 40°56′56″N 86°20′19″W

Marshtown is an unincorporated community in Fulton County, Indiana, in the United States. It is also known as Bluegrass or Blue Grass.

== History ==
The post office Marshtown once contained was called Blue Grass. The Blue Grass post office operated from 1851 until 1906.
