= Fletcher, Indiana =

- Unincorporated community
- Location within Indiana Location within the United States
- Coordinates: 40°54′43″N 86°19′58″W
- Country: United States
- State: Indiana
- County: Fulton
- Township: Wayne
- Elevation: 797 ft (243 m)
- ZIP code: 46939
- FIPS code: 18-23629
- GNIS feature ID: 434594

Fletcher or Fletcher Lake is an unincorporated community in Wayne Township, Fulton County, Indiana.

== History ==
A post office was established at Fletcher in 1888, and remained in operation until it was discontinued in 1904. The name of the community honors John Fletcher, a pioneer settler.

== Geography ==
Fletcher is located next to Fletcher Lake.
