= Fulton, Indiana =

Town of Fulton, Indiana
- Town
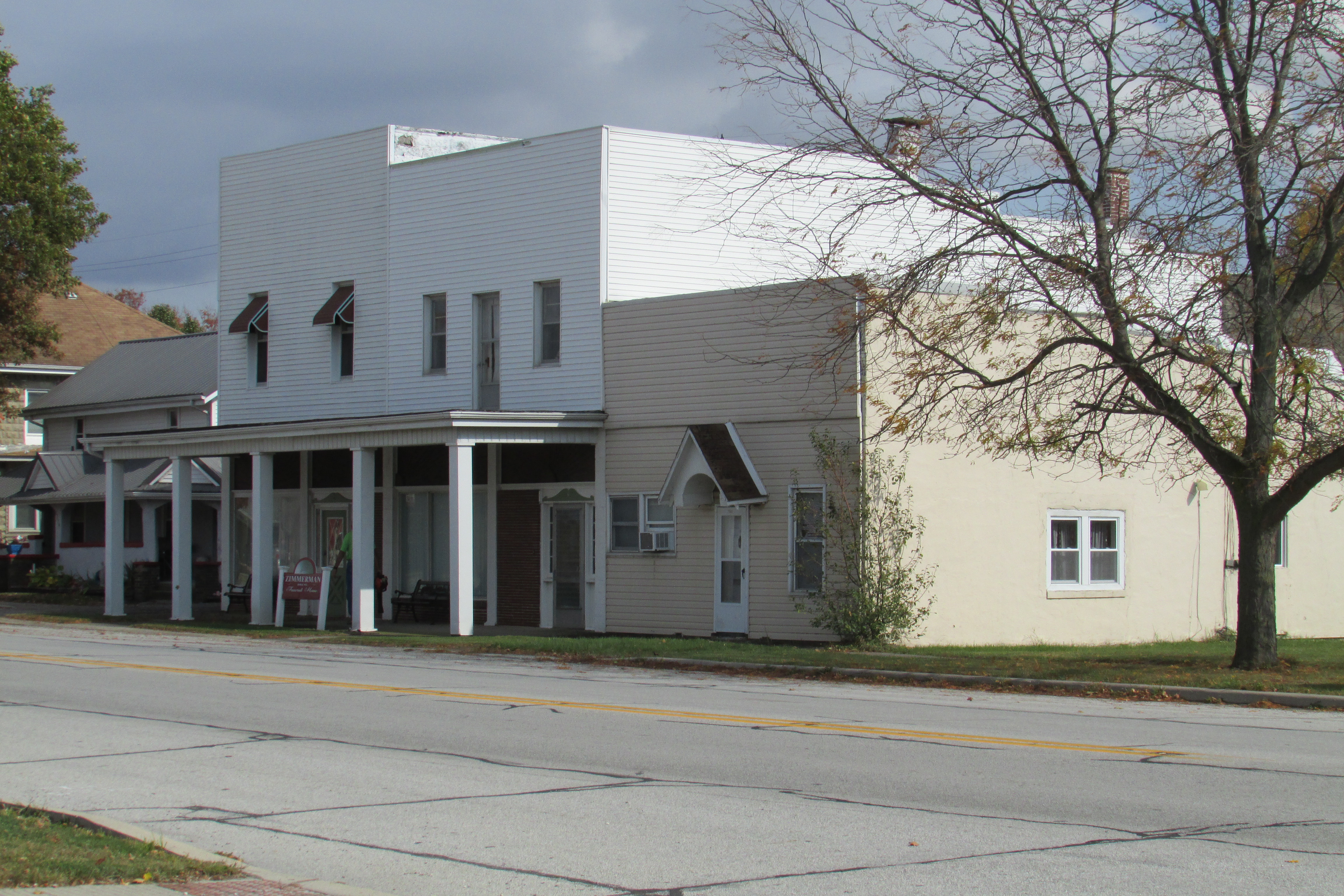
- Fulton, Indiana.

- Location of Fulton in Fulton County, Indiana.
- Coordinates: 40°56′47″N 86°15′51″W
- Country: United States
- State: Indiana
- County: Fulton
- Township: Liberty

Area
  - Total: 0.19 sq mi (0.48 km^{2})
  - Land: 0.19 sq mi (0.48 km^{2})
  - Water: 0 sq mi (0.00 km^{2})
- Elevation: 784 ft (239 m)

Population (2020)
  - Total: 303
  - Density: 1,625.2/sq mi (627.49/km^{2})
- Time zone: UTC-5 (EST)
  - Summer (DST): UTC-5 (EST)
- ZIP code: 46931
- Area code: 574
- FIPS code: 18-26152
- GNIS feature ID: 2396953

Fulton is a town in Liberty Township, Fulton County, Indiana, United States. As of the 2020 census, Fulton had a population of 303.

== History ==
Fulton took its name from Fulton County. The Fulton post office was established in 1843. In 1850 the first log cabin was erected in Fulton. Robert Aitken and family were the first occupants of the cabin and occupied a saw mill in the town. The village roads and markers were laid out in 1851 by Judge Wright of Logansport. The first schoolhouse was erected in 1845. In 1909 the first brick school was built. In 1852 the first church was erected by the Methodists. In late 1853 the Baptists also organized a church. Robert Aitken, the first settler, was appointed by the government as first postmaster in 1851. A tannery was established in 1851, and then a second tannery in 1853. Other additional businesses included a blacksmith shop, a grist mill, a carpet weaver, and an inn, erected in 1852 and eventually became a hotel. There was also a wood shop and other small businesses. The town's first doctor, Franklin C. Dielman, came to town after his graduation from medical school. The first child delivered by Dr. Dielman was Hiram Ford, the first baby girl was Kathleen Rannels Carrithers. Fulton's first bank was opened in 1907. The first newspaper, “The Fulton Leader” was established in 1901. A library was organized in 1920 and became a part of the Fulton County Library system in 1921. The Knights of Pythias was organized in 1905; The Masonic Lodge in 1906, followed by the Eastern Star in 1912. Fulton's first street lights were installed in the summer of 1916.

== Geography ==
According to the 2010 census, Fulton has a total area of 0.18 square miles (0.47 km^{2}), all land.

== Demographics ==
Historical population
Census	Pop.	Note	%±
1910	296		—
1920	361		22.0%
1930	397		10.0%
1940	373		−6.0%
1950	366		−1.9%
1960	410		12.0%
1970	372		−9.3%
1980	393		5.6%
1990	371		−5.6%
2000	326		−12.1%
2010	333		2.1%
2020	303		−9.0%
U.S. Decennial Census

=== 2010 census ===
As of the census of 2010, there were 333 people, 128 households, and 89 families residing in the town. The population density was 1,850.0 inhabitants per square mile (714.3/km^{2}). There were 145 housing units at an average density of 805.6 per square mile (311.0/km^{2}). The racial makeup of the town was 98.2% White and 1.8% from other races. Hispanic or Latino of any race were 2.1% of the population.

There were 128 households, of which 39.1% had children under the age of 18 living with them, 48.4% were married couples living together, 9.4% had a female householder with no husband present, 11.7% had a male householder with no wife present, and 30.5% were non-families. 25.8% of all households were made up of individuals, and 10.1% had someone living alone who was 65 years of age or older. The average household size was 2.60 and the average family size was 3.07.

The median age in the town was 36.9 years. 30.3% of residents were under the age of 18; 7.5% were between the ages of 18 and 24; 22.8% were from 25 to 44; 23.7% were from 45 to 64; and 15.6% were 65 years of age or older. The gender makeup of the town was 50.8% male and 49.2% female.

=== 2000 census ===
As of the census of 2000, there were 326 people, 127 households, and 93 families residing in the town. The population density was 1,797.9 inhabitants per square mile (694.2/km^{2}). There were 142 housing units at an average density of 783.1 per square mile (302.4/km^{2}). The racial makeup of the town was 99.69% White, 0.31% from other races.

There were 127 households, out of which 37.0% had children under the age of 18 living with them, 63.8% were married couples living together, 7.1% had a female householder with no husband present, and 26.0% were non-families. 24.4% of all households were made up of individuals, and 11.8% had someone living alone who was 65 years of age or older. The average household size was 2.57 and the average family size was 3.04.

In the town, the population was spread out, with 26.7% under the age of 18, 7.7% from 18 to 24, 32.5% from 25 to 44, 17.8% from 45 to 64, and 15.3% who were 65 years of age or older. The median age was 34 years. For every 100 females, there were 97.6 males. For every 100 females age 18 and over, there were 89.7 males.

The median income for a household in the town was $44,375, and the median income for a family was $47,500. Males had a median income of $32,045 versus $25,547 for females. The per capita income for the town was $16,732. About 3.3% of families and 2.4% of the population were below the poverty line, including 2.5% of those under age 18 and none of those age 65 or over.

== Education ==
Fulton has a public library, a branch of the Fulton County Public Library.
