= Fletcher (given name) =

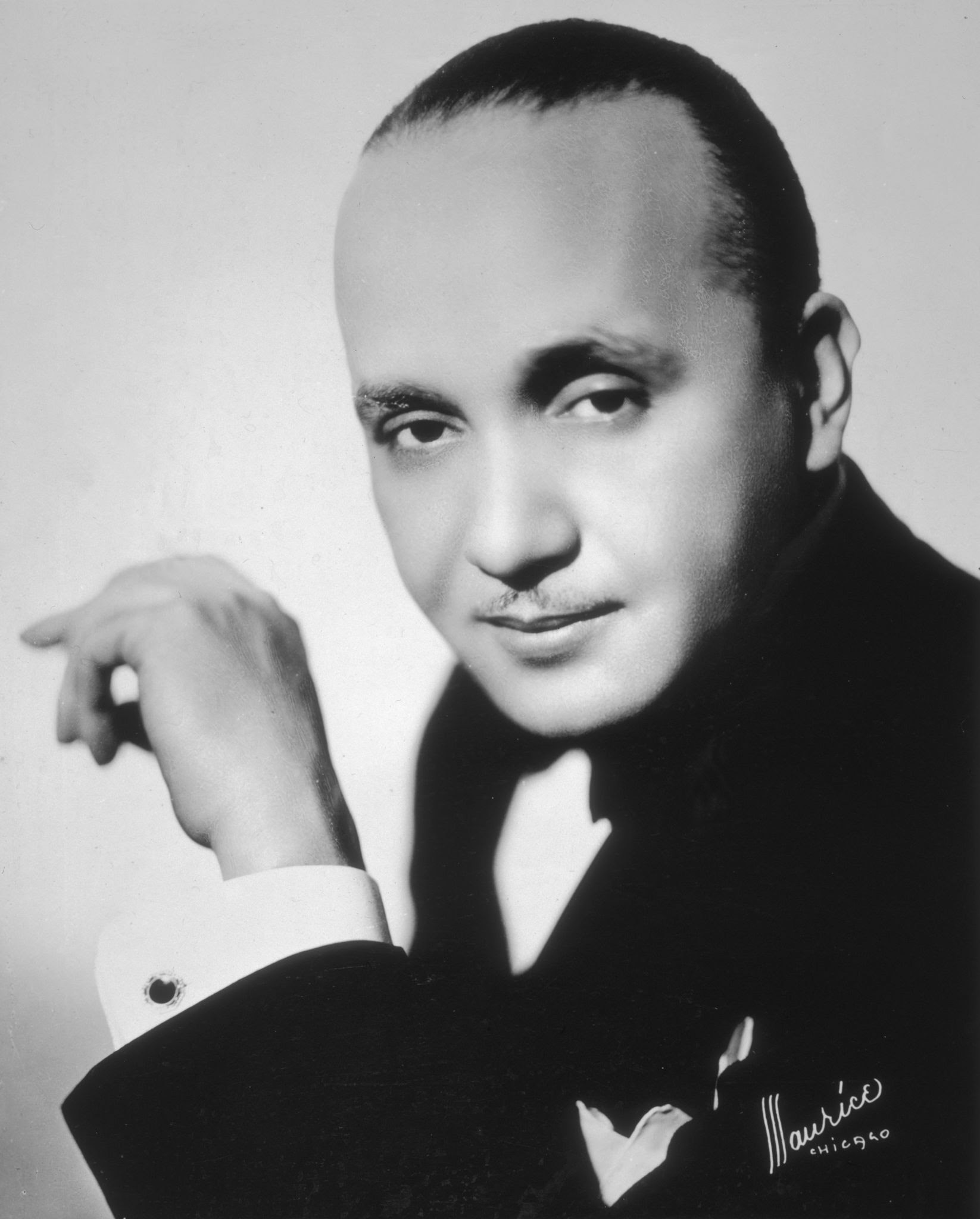
Fletcher Henderson (1897–1952), American musician

Fletcher is a masculine given name, which may refer to:

== People ==
- Fletcher Abram (born 1950), American former handball player
- Fletcher E. Adams (1921–1944), American World War II flying ace
- Fletcher Allen (1905–1995), American jazz saxophonist and clarinetist
- Fletcher Anderson (born 2002), New Zealand rugby union player
- Fletcher Benton (1931–2019), American sculptor, painter and kinetic artist
- Fletcher Bowron (1887–1968), long-serving Mayor of Los Angeles, California
- Fletcher Christian (1764–1793), mutineer who seized command of HMS Bounty
- Fletcher Cox (born 1990), American football player
- Fletcher Dragge (born 1966), lead guitar player in the band Pennywise
- Fletcher Hale (1883–1931), U.S. Representative from New Hampshire and lawyer
- Fletcher Hanks (1887–1976), a cartoonist from the Golden Age of Comic Books, creator of Stardust the Super Wizard
- Fletcher Harper (1806–1877), American publisher, founder of Harper's Weekly, Harper's Magazine and Harper's Bazaar
- Fletcher L. Hartsell Jr. (born 1947), American politician
- Fletcher Henderson (1897–1952), American pianist, bandleader, arranger and composer of big band jazz and swing music
- Fletcher Humphrys (born 1976), Australian actor
- Fletcher Jones (American entrepreneur) (1931–1972), American businessman, computer pioneer and Thoroughbred racehorse owner
- Fletcher Jones (1895–1977), Australian clothing manufacturer and retailer
- Fletcher Knebel (1911–1993), American writer of political fiction
- Fletcher Loyer (born 2003), American basketball player
- Fletcher Magee (born 1996), American basketball player
- Fletcher Markle (1921–1991), Canadian actor, screenwriter, television producer and director
- Fletcher Martin (1904–1979), American painter
- Fletcher Pratt (1897–1956), American writer of science fiction, fantasy and history
- Fletcher D. Proctor (1860–1911), American businessman, politician and governor of Vermont
- L. Fletcher Prouty (1917-2001), Chief of Special Operations for the Joint Chiefs of Staff under President John F. Kennedy, U.S. Air Force colonel and foreign policy critic
- B. Fletcher Robinson was the pen name used by Bertram Fletcher Robinson (1870–1907), the British journalist, editor, author and sportsperson
- Fletcher Sibthorp (born 1967), British painter
- Fletcher Smith (rugby union) (born 1995), New Zealand rugby union player
- Fletcher Smith (American football) (born 1943), American football safety
- Fletcher Steele (1885–1971), American landscape architect
- Fletcher Stockdale (c. 1823–1890), American politician, Governor of Texas, lawyer and railroad official
- Fletcher B. Swank (1875–1950), American politician and a U.S. Representative from Oklahoma
- Fletcher Thompson (1925–2022), American lawyer and politician
- Fletcher Webster (1818–1862), American government official and Union Army colonel, son of Daniel Webster
- Fletcher Westphal (born 2005), American football player

== Fictional characters ==
- Fletcher Reade, on the American soap opera Guiding Light played by Jay Hammer
- Fletcher Reede, the main character of the film Liar Liar played by Jim Carrey
- Fletcher Renn, a supporting character of the book series Skulduggery Pleasant by Derek Landy
- Fletcher Tringham, in the anime series Fullmetal Alchemist
- Fletcher (Fletch), a green Diesel who works for the chuggineers and shares a friendly rivalry with Tyne.
