= Rochester Township, Fulton County, Indiana =

Rochester Township
- Township
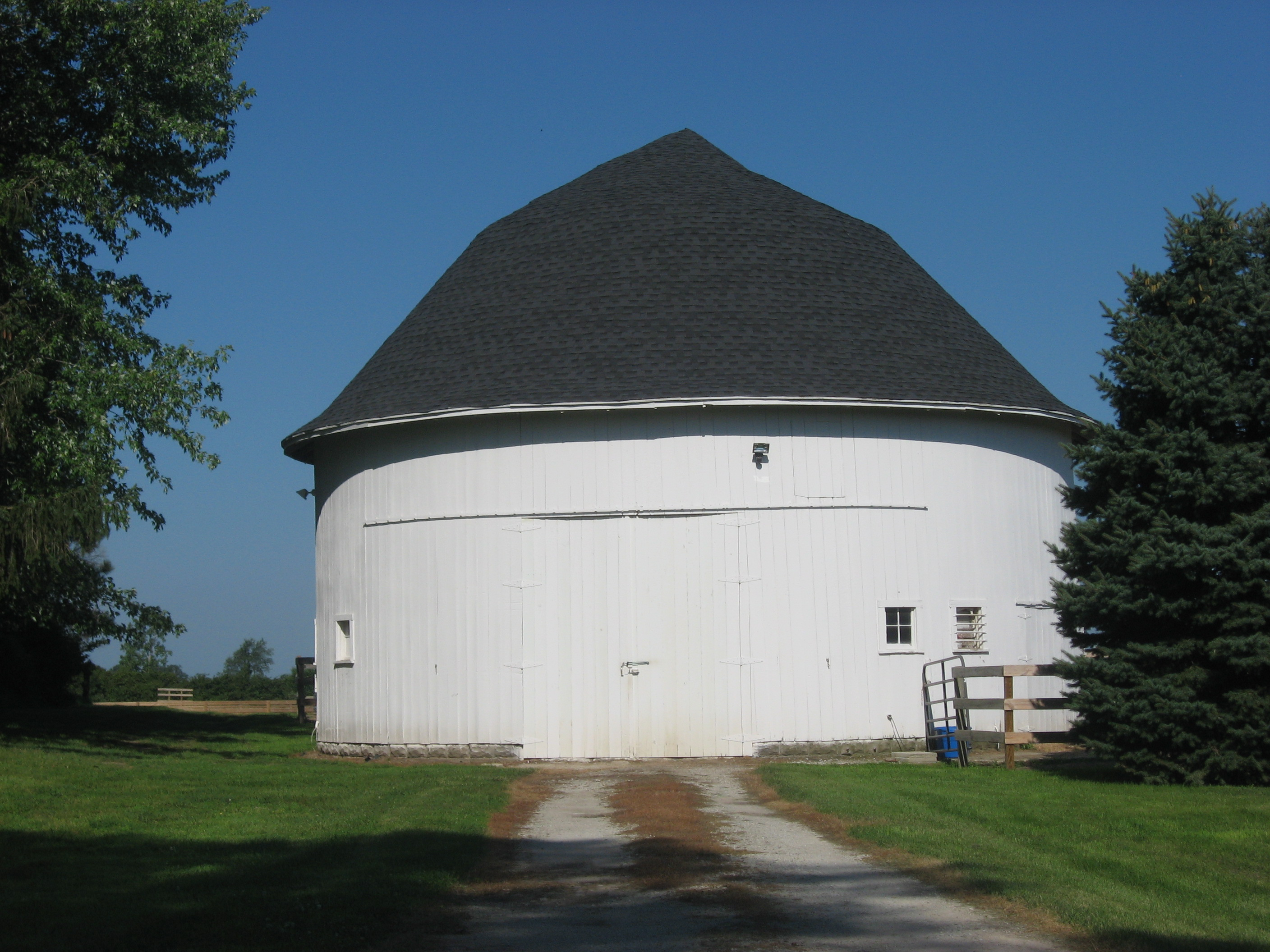
- Don Smiley Round Barn, west of Rochester

- Location of Rochester Township in Fulton County
- Coordinates: 41°03′10″N 86°14′25″W
- Country: United States
- State: Indiana
- County: Fulton

Government
  - Type: Indiana township

Area
  - Total: 83.95 sq mi (217.4 km^{2})
  - Land: 82.57 sq mi (213.9 km^{2})
  - Water: 1.38 sq mi (3.6 km^{2})
- Elevation: 774 ft (236 m)

Population (2020)
  - Total: 10,201
  - Density: 123.3/sq mi (47.6/km^{2})
- FIPS code: 18-65232
- GNIS feature ID: 453807

Rochester Township is one of eight townships in Fulton County, Indiana. As of the 2020 census, its population was 10,201 (up from 10,181 at 2010) and it contained 4,924 housing units.

== Geography ==
According to the 2010 census, the township has a total area of 83.95 square miles (217.4 km^{2}), of which 82.57 square miles (213.9 km^{2}) (or 98.36%) is land and 1.38 square miles (3.6 km^{2}) (or 1.64%) is water.

=== Cities and towns ===
- Rochester (the county seat)

=== Unincorporated towns ===
- Big Hill

(This list is based on USGS data and may include former settlements.)

=== Adjacent townships ===
- Richland Township (north)
- Newcastle Township (northeast)
- Henry Township (east)
- Allen Township, Miami County (southeast)
- Liberty Township (south)
- Wayne Township (southwest)
- Union Township (west)
- Aubbeenaubbee Township (northwest)

=== Major highways ===
- U.S. Route 31
- Indiana State Road 14
- Indiana State Road 25

=== Cemeteries ===
The township contains five cemeteries: Antioch, Citizens, Independent Order of Odd Fellows, Mount Zion and Old Shelton.
