= Fletcher Collection =

1682 Penny Post Paid Dockwra handstamp on letter posted at Lime Street to Warwick Lane in London. A prime artefact in the Fletcher Collection.

The Fletcher Collection is Hugh Greenwell Fletcher's lifetime philatelic collection of British postage stamps and British stamps used abroad including overprints and non-stamp items such as postal stationery. On his death in 1968 (aged 86), the collection was bequeathed to the Bruce Castle Museum in Tottenham, once the home of Sir Rowland Hill. The collection was donated to the British Library in 1989.

== Description ==
Half of the collection is of pre-adhesive material. There is a 1682 letter carried by the William Dockwra's original London Penny Post, and a study of the handstamps once the government took over the service. The collection includes a group of early 19th century 5th Clause Posts. The uniform rates include seventy-three examples of the 1839–1840 handstruck 4d. (including used on 5 December 1839, the first day of the new rate, from Dublin, Edinburgh, and Glasgow), and during the subsequent period of the uniform one penny rate with rare private prepaid envelopes printed by Baraclough in brown (illustrated), and by Buchanan in blue.

The remaining collection includes a wide range of stamps (mainly used), with plate reconstructions throughout the Queen Victoria period – including each of the plates of the 1840 penny black. Postal stationery is included with complete uncut sheets of Mulready 1d and 2d (envelopes and lettersheets of each value). There is a Mulready 1d lettersheet used on 2 May 1840, that were first sold on 1 May 1840. Later issues include embossed envelopes with advertising rings.

The stamps of Great Britain used abroad include covers showing mixed issue frankings from Danish West Indies, Nicaragua, and Beirut.

As of January 2008, the collection was held in 341 black boxes.

== See also ==
- British Library Philatelic Collection
- William Dockwra
