= Felchville =

Felchville may refer to:

- Felchville, Massachusetts, a populated place in Middlesex County
- Felchville, Vermont, a populated place in Windsor County
