= Tiosa, Indiana =

- Unincorporated community
- Location within Indiana Location within the United States
- Coordinates: 41°09′10″N 86°12′20″W
- Country: United States
- State: Indiana
- County: Fulton
- Township: Richland
- Elevation: 846 ft (258 m)
- ZIP code: 46975
- FIPS code: 18-75806
- GNIS feature ID: 444774

Tiosa is an unincorporated community in Richland Township, Fulton County, Indiana.

== History ==
Tiosa was established in about 1869. The community was named in honor of a Potawatomi chief. A post office was established at Tiosa in 1872, and remained in operation until it was discontinued in 1932.
