= Fletcher Sibthorp =

English painter

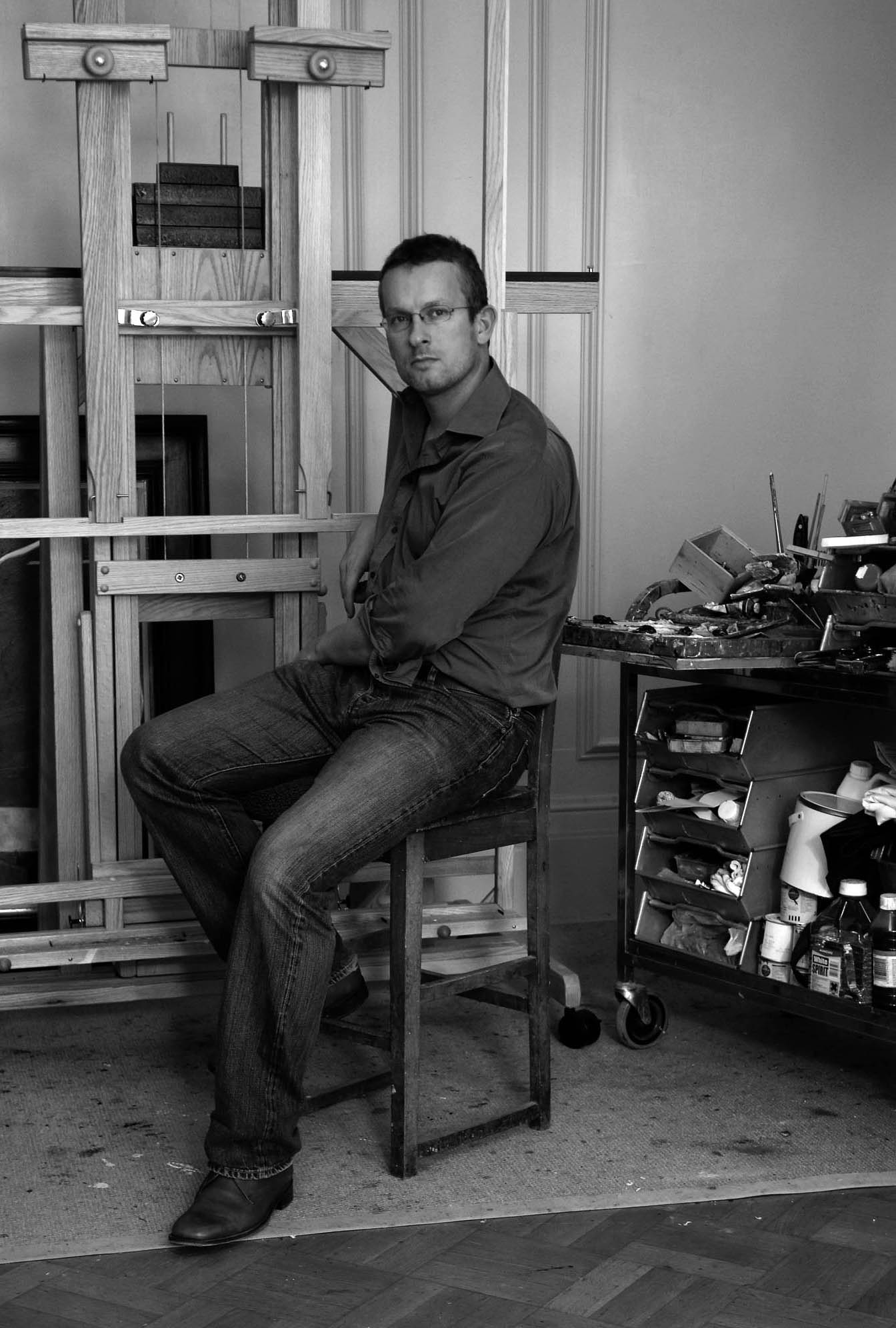
- Sibthorp in his studio
- Born: 7 March 1967 (age 59); Hertfordshire; England
- Education: Kingston University
- Known for: Painter
- Notable work: Flamenco Gold, The Sorceresses, Chroma I
- Movement: Figurative
- Awards: Communication Arts Certificates of Excellence; Winner 2006 ABT (Fine Art Guild) John Solomon Award for Best Selling Artist
- Website: fletchersibthorp.com

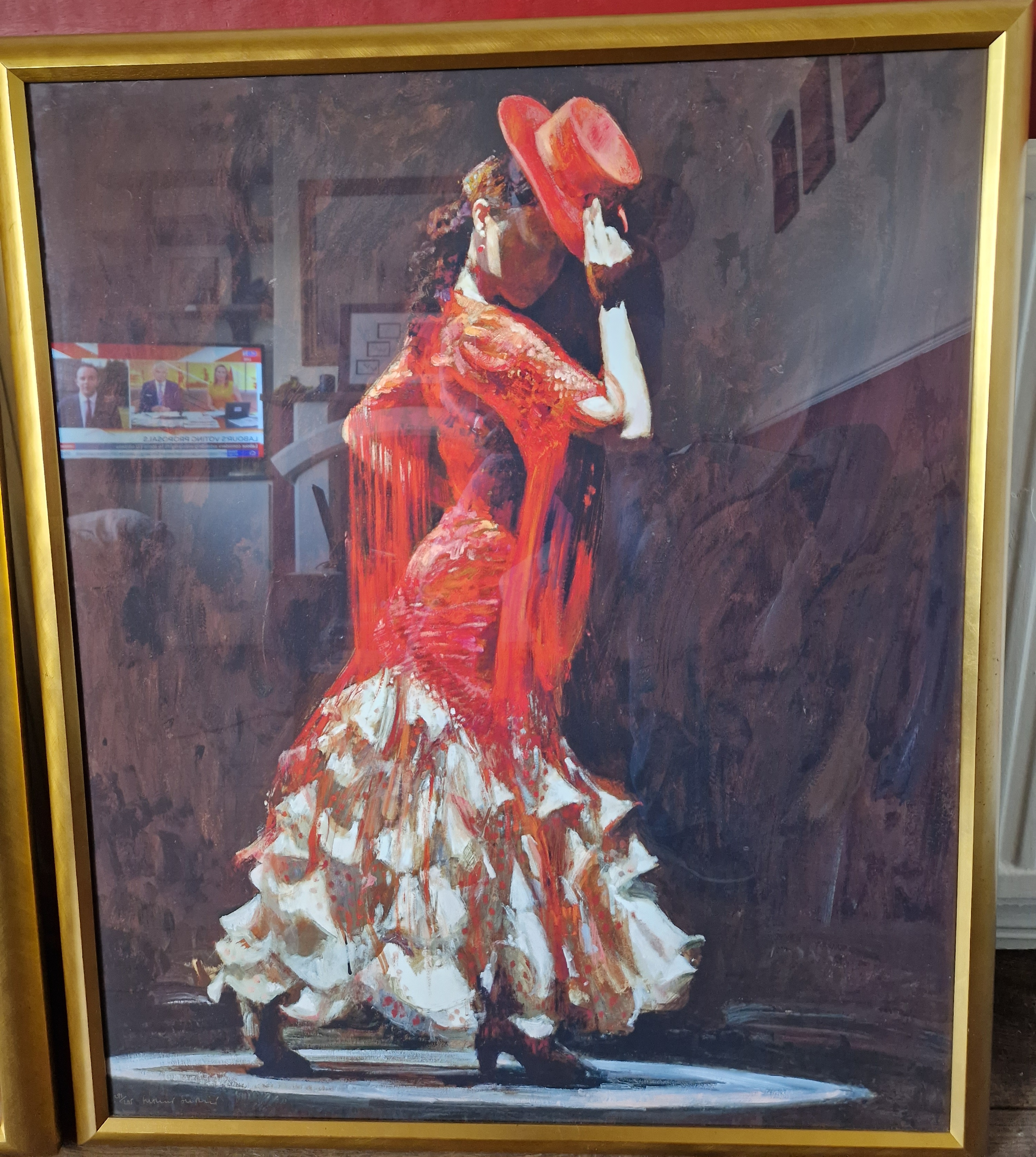
Fletcher Sibthorp

Fletcher Sibthorp (born 7 March 1967) is a British artist based in London, England. He is predominantly known for his large-scale figurative pieces, mostly in oil and usually depicting movement in the form of dance; ranging from contemporary dance through to classical ballet and flamenco. His work is housed in both private and corporate collections, mostly in the United Kingdom and Japan. He has painted several key figures in the world of dance, notably Royal Ballet principals Darcey Bussell, Sarah Lamb, Miyako Yoshida and Alina Cojocaru, and the flamenco performers, Joaquín Cortés, Eva Yerbabuena and Sara Baras.

== Early life ==
Fletcher Sibthorp was born in Bricket Wood, Hertfordshire, England and studied Illustration at Kingston University (then known as Kingston Polytechnic), graduating with Honours in 1989. During his studies there and immediately following graduation, Sibthorp developed a keen interest in exploring the idea of movement and its subsequent effect on the human form, usually experimenting in oil. His key influences at that time were the British painters Francis Bacon and Frank Auerbach, as well as artists Gustav Klimt and Edgar Degas.

== Career ==
Movement, its effect on the human form and sport

Although he worked to a large format, many of his earlier commissions were for nevertheless for book jackets, magazine articles and corporate brochures. He persisted, however, in experimenting outside of commissioned work, predominantly in the area of sport and in 1992, his efforts culminated in his first solo show, entitled ‘In Motion’, at the Stable Gallery, Wandsworth, London. Five large scale pieces from this show, portrayals of gymnasts and athletes, were acquired by a Private Sports Club for their flagship club in the City (of London), as a permanent collection.

He continued to be commissioned for figurative sport pieces for magazines, notably The Evening Standard, who asked him to illustrate the Wimbledon Tennis Championships (The Championships, Wimbledon) for the cover of their lifestyle glossy, the ES magazine, as well as large corporate companies such as British Petroleum (BP) and British Telecom (BT).

In 1997, after being awarded several Certificates of Excellence by the magazine Communication Arts he subsequently featured in three of their CA Illustration Annuals. One of these awards was for an image commissioned by the Royal Shakespeare Company for a production of Othello; another, for a portrait of Bertrand Russell used on a biographical book jacket. A New York-based advertising agency saw his work and selected him - as one of four artists - to paint 'live' for a Kirin beer campaign in New York. There followed a 4-man show of each artist's work at the Kirin Art Space in central Tokyo, Japan entitled ' New York No Otokotachi' (4 Painters from New York).

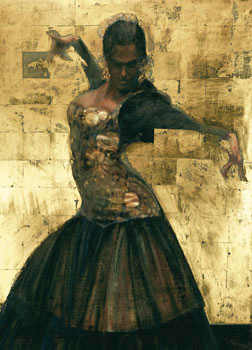
Flamenco Gold 1998. Finished painting after a series of preparatory studies. Oil and gold leaf on canvas and glass.

A move away from Sport

Fletcher had been approached by the Sadler's Wells Theatre in 1995, with a view to producing a painting of the Flamenco troupe formed by Paco Peña. This was the key starting point for his interest in all forms of dance, and a move away from depicting athletes. Although the image he produced was not eventually used, his having been invited to the press performance resulted in a very key piece and his earliest Flamenco painting "Flamenco Gold' which was used on the cover of Jason Webster's best selling book: Duende; A Journey In Search of Flamenco.

A chance meeting whilst in Japan for the Kirin show (in which Flamenco Gold was propitiously one of the pieces being exhibited), led to his being invited to hold the first of his solo exhibitions in Tokyo - "Leyenda - Studies of Joaquín Cortés and Dancers". Yearly shows in Japan have since resulted in Fletcher's work bought by private Japanese collectors, particularly his Flamenco pieces. (Flamenco as a dance form has an enormous following in Japan - with the most enthusiasts after Spain and with numerous magazines dedicated solely to the subject. Sibthorp has been interviewed for several of these specialist publications.)

In 2000 - a solo show, 'Quiet Space', at the China Club in Hong Kong, saw a temporary departure from dance as it consisted solely of very still figurative pieces. This subject matter continues to form a small but important part of his collective work.

A return to London

Although Sibthorp accepted private and corporate commissions in the UK, a gap of 13 years was to mark his absence in British galleries, as he concentrated on Japan. It was not until 2005 that he held a solo show, in the exhibition heartland of London: Cork Street in Mayfair. 'Passion' was a well-received mixed-subject show of flamenco, modern dance and portrait work, and it coincided with the publication of his first book, also entitled Passion. It was at this juncture that he began to gain real recognition from UK collectors.

Art for the 'populace'

Also known in Britain for his popular limited-edition prints of flamenco dancers, he won the Fine Art Trade Guild's poll as the most successful living British print artist of 2006, thus receiving the John Solomon Award. The previous two years had seen the hugely successful artist Jack Vettriano as holder of the title. The Guild's poll very much reflects the sharp contrast between how the public view the Turner Prize and what they actually buy to adorn walls of home and office.

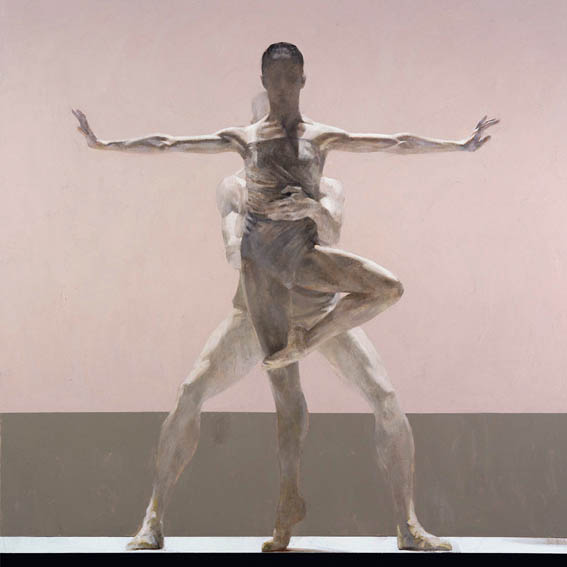
Chroma I, 2007- Finished painting, oil on board.

Balletic themes

Following the success of his 2005 show, he was approached by the respected Medici Gallery, also an established Cork Street gallery. Sibthorp held his first mixed show with them the following year and included some of his first Royal Ballet pieces. The subsequent 2007 Medici show saw a further shift in emphasis away from Flamenco with many more paintings and studies that were the result of his attending dress rehearsals and photocalls at the Royal Opera House. His most notable pieces were inspired by the modern ballet 'Chroma' by Royal Ballet 'Choreographer-In-Residence', Wayne McGregor and with sets by the British minimalist architect John Pawson, as well as the production of Danse à Grande Vitesse, by choreographer Christopher Wheeldon and featuring the principal dancer Darcey Bussell. One of the paintings from this latter production sold for £25,000, elevating Sibthorp's work to the next 'status level' in contemporary British figurative art.

The response from this show was such that Sibthorp was invited to be sole observer of the last studio rehearsals of Darcey Bussell with her regular dance partners Gary Avis and Carlos Acosta, leading up to her final acclaimed retirement performance at The Royal Opera House.

He plans to continue to study the human figure and dance in all its forms.
