= Fletcher, Ontario =

Fletcher
- Unincorporated community
- Interactive map of Fletcher
- Coordinates: 42°17′39″N 82°17′48″W
- Country: Canada
- Province: Ontario
- Municipality: Chatham-Kent
- Time zone: UTC-5 (EST)
  - Summer (DST): UTC-4 (EDT)
- Forward sortation area: N0P 1W0
- Area codes: 519 and 226
- NTS Map: 040J08
- GNBC Code: FBEII

Fletcher is a small farming community located in southwestern Ontario, Canada. It lies north of the shores of Lake Erie.

Fletcher was the home of Armstrong Brick and Tile, whose plant was remarkable for three large Beehive-style kilns. The company made drainage tile for the surrounding farmlands at a time when drainage tile was made of clay, and not today's plastic. It was run by Thomas Henry "Harry" Armstrong and his wife Annie (née Bowman). Harry fought in WWI, was a noted marksman and served at Vimy Ridge. They had two daughters Paula and Sheila. His great grandson, through Paula's son Jason and wife Linda (née Langner), was in turn named Fletcher Harrison Smith, after the town and Harry. Fletcher Smith became a track and field thrower of note. At 17 he threw shot put, discus and javelin, having won National Legion Gold For shot put and National Bronze for javelin in 2015.

If the clay was good enough and Harry felt there was demand he would make bricks and many of the surrounding towns, such as Tilbury, would have homes and city buildings made of his brick. Many of the family farms are now cropped by larger industrial-style farms. In the 2000s, members of the community have been debating the zoning of a landfill to be located within its borders.
