= Richland Center, Indiana =

- Unincorporated community
- Location within Indiana Location within the United States
- Coordinates: 41°09′23″N 86°16′14″W
- Country: United States
- State: Indiana
- County: Fulton
- Township: Richland
- Elevation: 883 ft (269 m)
- ZIP code: 46975
- FIPS code: 18-64251
- GNIS feature ID: 449716

Richland Center is an unincorporated community in Richland Township, Fulton County, Indiana, USA.

Richland Center (also spelled Richland Centre in its early years) had a post office from 1878 until 1902.
