= Henry Township, Fulton County, Indiana =

Henry Township
- Township
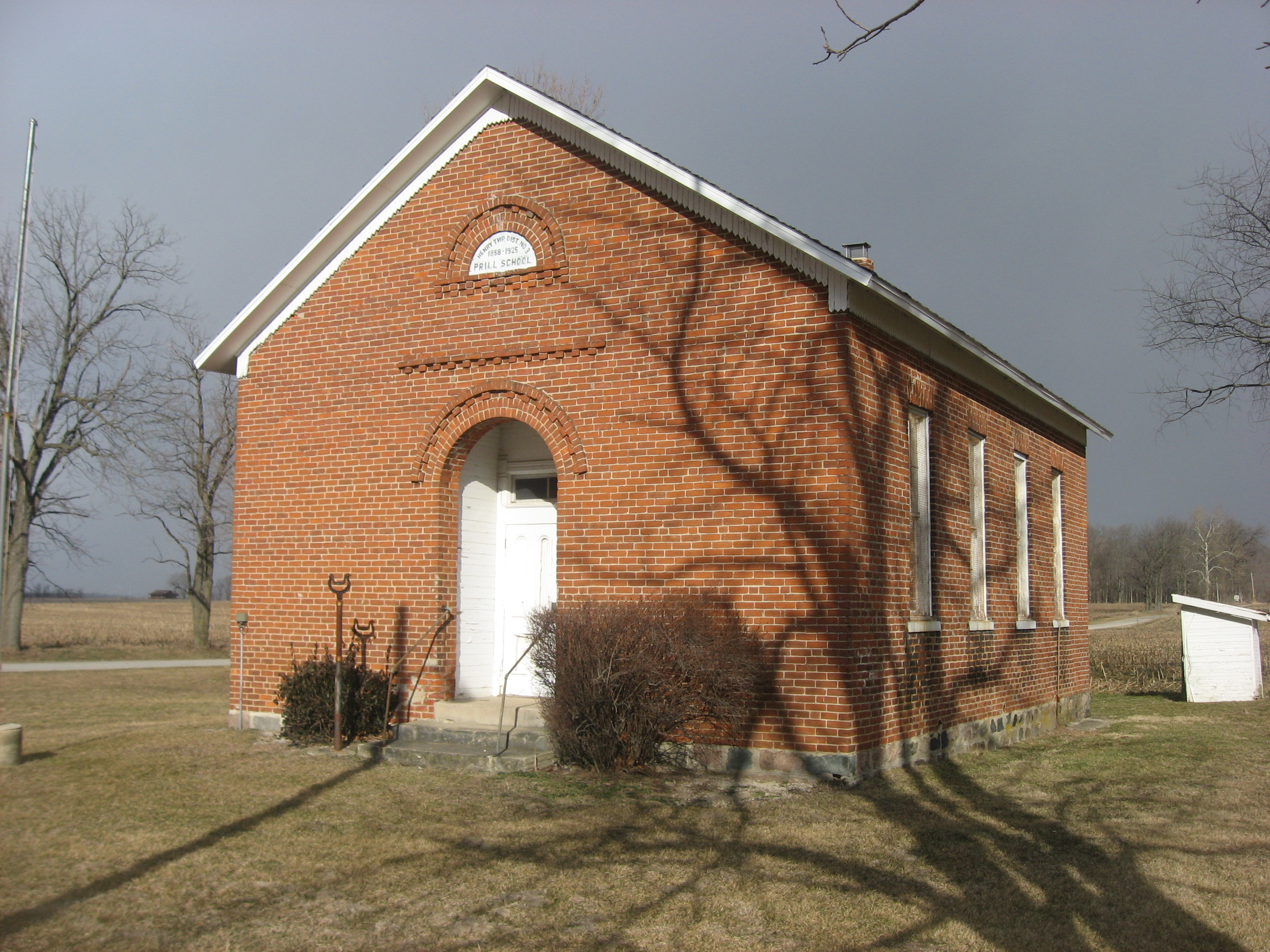
- The Prill School, a museum in the township

- Location of Henry Township in Fulton County
- Coordinates: 41°02′23″N 86°03′13″W
- Country: United States
- State: Indiana
- County: Fulton

Government
  - Type: Indiana township

Area
  - Total: 46.75 sq mi (121.1 km^{2})
  - Land: 46.45 sq mi (120.3 km^{2})
  - Water: 0.3 sq mi (0.78 km^{2})
- Elevation: 833 ft (254 m)

Population (2020)
  - Total: 3,072
  - Density: 65.6/sq mi (25.3/km^{2})
- FIPS code: 18-33106
- GNIS feature ID: 453406

Henry Township is one of eight townships in Fulton County, Indiana. As of the 2020 census, its population was 3,072 (up from 3,048 at 2010) and it contained 1,190 housing units.

== History ==
When Fulton County was organized in January 1836, Henry Township was a part of Rochester Township, and remained this way until 1838. However, no one settled in the township until February 1836, when four men settled there with their families. Henry Township is named after Henry Hoover, who was, at the time of naming, the oldest resident of the township.

The Prill School and Utter-Gerig Round Barn are listed on the National Register of Historic Places.

== Geography ==
According to the 2010 census, the township has a total area of 46.75 square miles (121.1 km^{2}), of which 46.45 square miles (120.3 km^{2}) (or 99.36%) is land and 0.3 square miles (0.78 km^{2}) (or 0.64%) is water.

=== Cities and towns ===
- Akron

=== Unincorporated towns ===
- Athens
- Lowman Corner

(This list is based on USGS data and may include former settlements.)

=== Adjacent townships ===
- Franklin Township, Kosciusko County (north)
- Seward Township, Kosciusko County (northeast)
- Pleasant Township, Wabash County (east)
- Perry Township, Miami County (southeast)
- Allen Township, Miami County (southwest)
- Rochester Township (west)
- Newcastle Township (northwest)

=== Major highways ===
- Indiana State Road 14
- Indiana State Road 19
- Indiana State Road 114

=== Cemeteries ===
The township contains two cemeteries: Independent Order of Odd Fellows and Mount Hope Athens.

== Education ==
Henry Township residents may obtain a free library card from the Akron Carnegie Public Library in Akron.
