= Akron, Indiana =

- Town
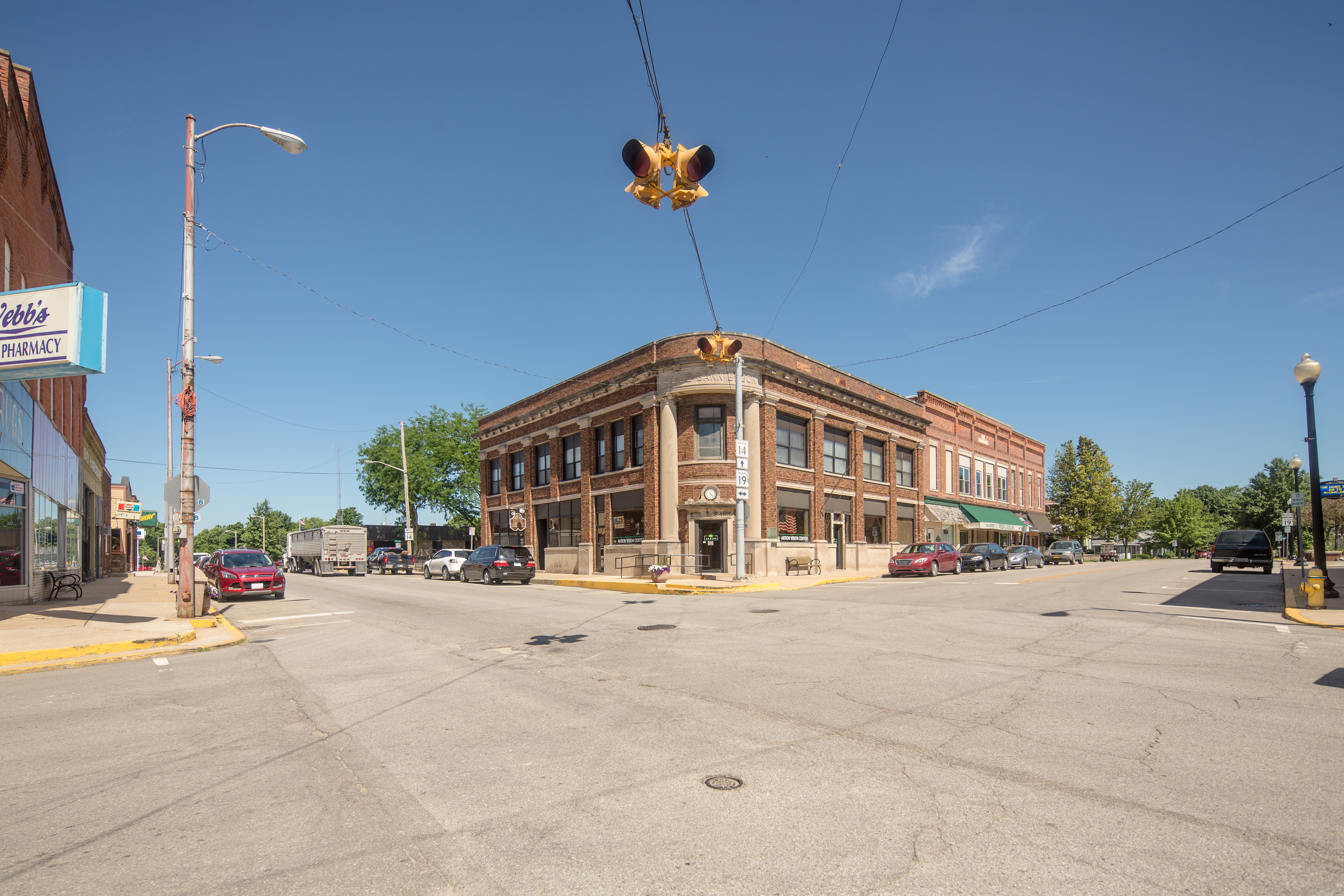

- Location of Akron in Fulton County, Indiana.

- Location within Indiana Location within the United States Location within North America
- Coordinates: 41°02′20″N 86°01′30″W
- Country: United States
- State: Indiana
- County: Fulton
- Township: Henry
- Established: July 4, 1836
- Incorporated: 1909

Area
  - Total: 0.46 sq mi (1.19 km^{2})
  - Land: 0.46 sq mi (1.19 km^{2})
  - Water: 0 sq mi (0.00 km^{2})
- Elevation: 856 ft (261 m)

Population (2020)
  - Total: 1,125
  - Density: 2,451.9/sq mi (946.69/km^{2})
- Time zone: UTC−5 (EST)
  - Summer (DST): UTC−5 (EST)
- ZIP code: 46910
- Area code: 574
- FIPS code: 18-00748
- GNIS ID: 2397420
- Website: www.akronindiana.com

Akron is a town in Henry Township, Fulton County, Indiana, United States. The population was 1,125 at the 2020 census.

== History ==
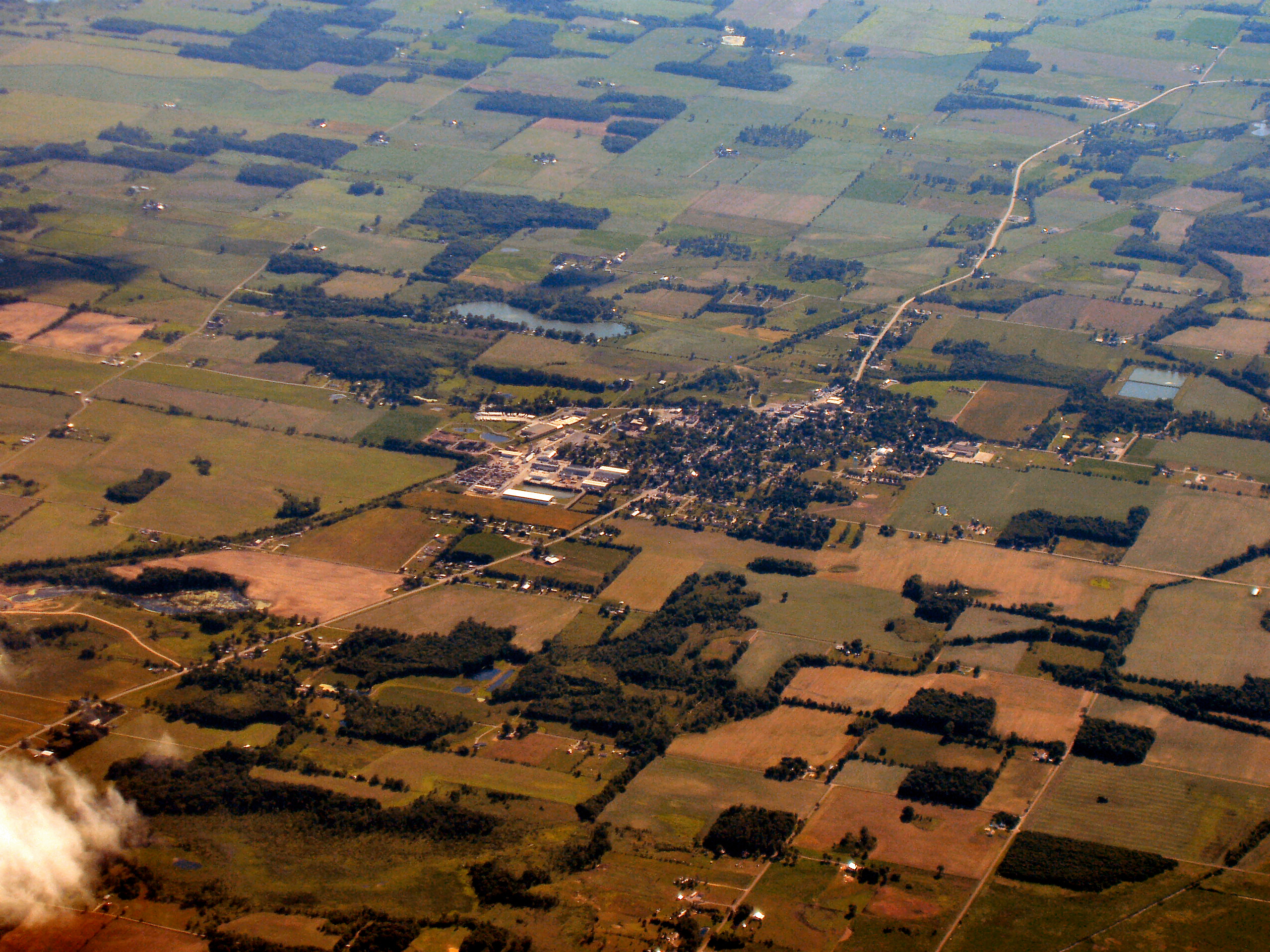
Akron from the air, looking west

Akron is located at the crossroad of SR 14 and SR 19. Akron was originally named Newark by settlers from Newark, Ohio; the name was changed to Akron in 1855, for the Ohio city. It was founded by Dr. Joseph Sippy on July 4, 1836 when he brought a group of settlers to what was then the crossing of the Pottawatomie and Miami Indian trails. The first building was constructed where the Methodist church stands now. Dr. Sippy's house, which once stood across the street from Viking Foods, was a stop on the Underground Railroad.

Akron was incorporated as a town in 1909.

== Geography ==
According to the 2010 census, Akron has a total area of 0.46 square miles (1.19 km^{2}), all land.

== Demographics ==
Historical population
Census	Pop.	Note	%±
1880	193		—
1910	768		—
1920	930		21.1%
1930	932		0.2%
1940	990		6.2%
1950	946		−4.4%
1960	958		1.3%
1970	1,019		6.4%
1980	1,045		2.6%
1990	1,001		−4.2%
2000	1,076		7.5%
2010	1,167		8.5%
2020	1,125		−3.6%
U.S. Decennial Census

=== 2020 census ===
As of the 2020 census, Akron had a population of 1,125. The median age was 33.1 years. 30.5% of residents were under the age of 18 and 12.0% of residents were 65 years of age or older. For every 100 females there were 94.0 males, and for every 100 females age 18 and over there were 91.7 males age 18 and over.

0.0% of residents lived in urban areas, while 100.0% lived in rural areas.

There were 394 households in Akron, of which 45.4% had children under the age of 18 living in them. Of all households, 55.3% were married-couple households, 13.2% were households with a male householder and no spouse or partner present, and 22.6% were households with a female householder and no spouse or partner present. About 18.0% of all households were made up of individuals and 8.8% had someone living alone who was 65 years of age or older.

There were 429 housing units, of which 8.2% were vacant. The homeowner vacancy rate was 1.4% and the rental vacancy rate was 6.9%.

Racial composition as of the 2020 census
Race	Number	Percent
White	850	75.6%
Black or African American	4	0.4%
American Indian and Alaska Native	8	0.7%
Asian	3	0.3%
Native Hawaiian and Other Pacific Islander	0	0.0%
Some other race	129	11.5%
Two or more races	131	11.6%
Hispanic or Latino (of any race)	387	34.4%

=== 2010 census ===
As of the 2010 Census, there were 1,167 people, 411 households, and 296 families living in the town. The population density was 2,537.0 inhabitants per square mile (979.5/km^{2}). There were 472 housing units at an average density of 1,026.1 per square mile (396.2/km^{2}). The racial makeup of the town was 74.2% White, 1.9% Native American, 22.5% from other races, and 1.5% from two or more races. Hispanic or Latino of any race were 30.1% of the population.

There were 411 households, of which 42.1% had children under the age of 18 living with them, 55.7% were married couples living together, 10.9% had a female householder with no husband present, 5.4% had a male householder with no wife present, and 28.0% were non-families. 24.6% of all households were made up of individuals, and 15.8% had someone living alone who was 65 years of age or older. The average household size was 2.84 and the average family size was 3.40.

The median age in the town was 33 years. 29.6% of residents were under the age of 18; 9.1% were between the ages of 18 and 24; 26.9% were from 25 to 44; 19.6% were from 45 to 64; and 14.7% were 65 years of age or older. The gender makeup of the town was 48.8% male and 51.2% female.

=== 2000 census ===
As of the 2000 Census, there were 1,076 people, 404 households, and 290 families living in the town. The population density was 2,365.8 inhabitants per square mile (913.4/km^{2}). There were 434 housing units at an average density of 954.3 per square mile (368.5/km^{2}). The racial makeup of the town was 91.45% White, 0.28% African American, 0.28% Native American, 7.16% from other races, and 0.84% from two or more races. Hispanic or Latino of any race were 14.68% of the population.

Of the 404 households, 36.1% had children under the age of 18 living with them, 55.0% were married couples living together, 10.6% had a female householder with no husband present, and 28.0% were non-families. 25.0% of all households were made up of individuals, and 15.8% had someone living alone who was 65 years of age or older. The average household size was 2.66 and the average family size was 3.13.

In the town, the population was spread out, with 29.6% under the age of 18, 11.3% from 18 to 24, 28.5% from 25 to 44, 14.9% from 45 to 64, and 15.7% who were 65 years of age or older. The median age was 33 years. For every 100 females, there were 98.2 males. For every 100 females age 18 and over, there were 89.5 males.

The median income for a household in the town was $12,406, and the median income for a family was $18,833. Males had a median income of $12,250 versus $10,170 for females. The per capita income for the town was $14,878. About 5.6% of families and 7.6% of the population were below the poverty line, including 4.7% of those under age 18 and 16.3% of those age 65 or over.

== Education ==
The town has a free lending library, the Akron Carnegie Public Library.
