= Fulton County, Indiana =

County in Indiana, United States

- County
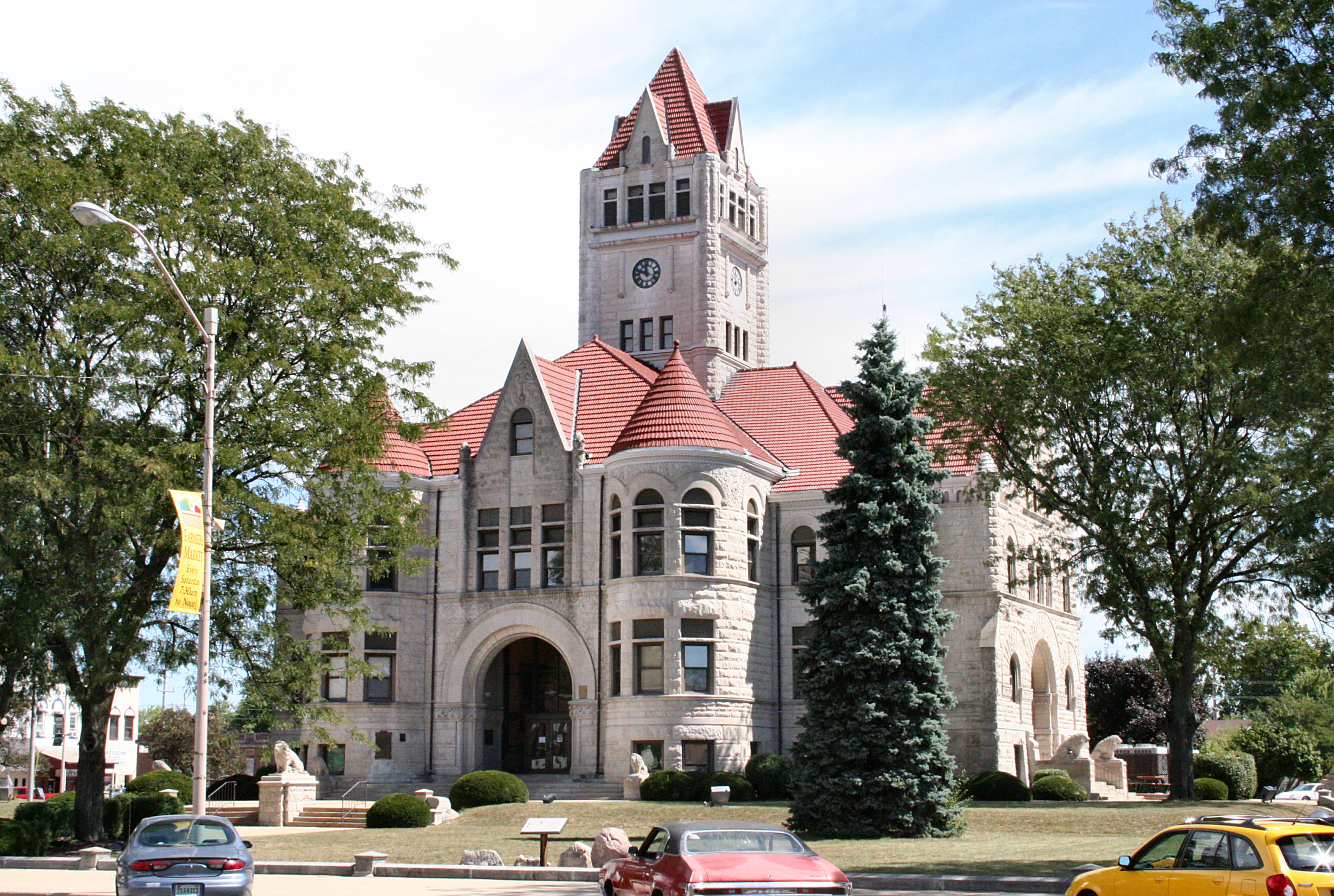
- Fulton County Courthouse in Rochester

- Location within the U.S. state of Indiana
- Coordinates: 41°02′N 86°16′W
- Country: United States
- State: Indiana
- Founded: 1836
- Named for: Robert Fulton
- Seat: Rochester
- Largest city: Rochester

Area
  - Total: 371.26 sq mi (961.6 km^{2})
  - Land: 368.39 sq mi (954.1 km^{2})
  - Water: 2.88 sq mi (7.5 km^{2}) 0.78%

Population (2020)
  - Total: 20,480
  - Estimate (2025): 20,091 ▼
  - Density: 55.59/sq mi (21.46/km^{2})
- Time zone: UTC−5 (Eastern)
  - Summer (DST): UTC−4 (EDT)
- Congressional district: 2nd
- Website: www.co.fulton.in.us
- Indiana county number 25

Fulton County is a county located in the U.S. state of Indiana. As of 2020, the population was 20,480. The county seat is Rochester.

== History ==
The first non-Native Americans to ever set foot in what is now Fulton County, Indiana, were French traders. Few of them remained permanently as year-round residents of the area and by the 1830s there was no French population in what is now Fulton County.

In the 1820s and 1830s, migrants from New England began moving to what is now Indiana in large numbers (though there was a trickle of New England settlers who arrived before this date). These were “Yankee” settlers, that is to say they were descended from the English Puritans who settled New England during the colonial era. While most of them came to Indiana directly from New England, there were many who came from upstate New York. These were people whose parents had moved from New England to upstate New York in the immediate aftermath of the American Revolution. Due to the prevalence of New Englanders and New England transplants from upstate New York, the northern third of Indiana was very culturally contiguous with early New England culture for much of its early history.

The Yankee migration to Indiana was a result of several factors, one of the overpopulation of New England. The old stock Yankee population had large families, often bearing up to ten children in one household. Most people were expected to have their own piece of land to farm, and due to the massive and nonstop population boom, land in New England became scarce as every son claimed his own farmstead. As a result, there was not enough land for every family to have a self-sustaining farm, and Yankee settlers began leaving New England for the Midwestern United States.

They were aided in this effort by the construction and completion of the Erie Canal which made traveling to the region much easier, causing an additional surge in migrants coming from New England. Added to this was the end of the Black Hawk War, which made the region much safer to travel through and settle in for White settlers.

In the case of Fulton County, there were no attempts by United States settlers to permanently settle the area until the conclusion of the Blackhawk War. Fulton County's first permanent non-Native American settlers arrived in September and October 1832, most of whom came from New England though some of whom were New England transplants from upstate New York. Most of Fulton County's New England settlers came from Franklin County, Massachusetts, Grafton County, New Hampshire and Orange County, Vermont, as well as several farming families from Maine and the rural northern region of Connecticut. At first, virtually all of these settlers were farmers.

These settlers were primarily members of the Congregational Church, though due to the Second Great Awakening, many of them had converted to Methodism, and some had become Baptists before coming to what is now Cook County. The Congregational Church has subsequently gone through many divisions, and some factions, including those in Cook County, are now known as the Church of Christ and the United Church of Christ.

When the New Englanders arrived, there was nothing but dense virgin forest and wild prairie. They laid out farms, constructed roads, erected government buildings and established post routes. By the spring of 1833 the settlement was a successful and thriving farming community. Rochester was laid out in 1835. The founder Alexander Chamberlain named it for his former hometown of Rochester, New York. The Rochester post office was established in 1836.

Fulton County was formed in 1836. It was named for Robert Fulton, inventor of the steamboat. Native Americans in the county believed that a terrible monster lived in Lake Manitou and for that reason they never lived around the lake. Early settlers called it the Devil's Lake and there were many reported sightings of a monster.

The Potawatomi Trail of Death came through the town in 1838.

The 178-acre Moore Farm, then located two miles south of Rochester, was purchased in 1871 for use as the Fulton County Poor Farm. The County Home was closed on December 31, 1965, and the entire property was sold on December 17, 1966, by the county commissioners to State Senator Robert E. Peterson of Rochester.

== Geography ==
According to the 2010 census, the county has a total area of 371.26 square miles (961.6 km^{2}), of which 368.39 square miles (954.1 km^{2}) (or 99.23%) is land and 2.88 square miles (7.5 km^{2}) (or 0.78%) is water.

=== Cities and towns ===
- Akron
- Athens (unincorporated)
- Delong (unincorporated)
- Fulton
- Grass Creek (unincorporated)
- Kewanna
- Leiters Ford (unincorporated)
- Rochester (county seat)
- Tiosa (unincorporated)

=== Townships ===
- Aubbeenaubbee
- Henry
- Liberty
- Newcastle
- Richland
- Rochester
- Union
- Wayne

=== Major highways ===
- U.S. Route 31
- State Road 14
- State Road 17
- State Road 19
- State Road 25
- State Road 114

=== Railroads ===
- Fulton County Railroad

=== Adjacent counties ===
- Marshall County (north)
- Kosciusko County (northeast)
- Wabash County (east)
- Miami County (southeast)
- Cass County (south)
- Pulaski County (west)
- Starke County (northwest)

== Climate and weather ==
Rochester, Indiana

Climate chart (precipitation, max. and min. temperature)
J	F	M	A	M	J	J	A	S	O	N	D
2 30 15	1.7 35 18	2.7 47 28	3.8 59 38	4.2 71 49	4.1 80 59	3.8 84 63	3.7 82 60	3.4 75 52	2.9 63 41	3.4 48 32	2.7 36 21
- █ Average max. and min. temperatures in °F
- █ Precipitation totals in inches
- Source: The Weather Channel
Metric conversion
J	F	M	A	M	J	J	A	S	O	N	D
52 −1 −9	44 2 −8	69 8 −2	97 15 3	106 22 9	105 27 15	97 29 17	95 28 16	85 24 11	73 17 5	87 9 0	70 2 −6
- █ Average max. and min. temperatures in °C
- █ Precipitation totals in mm

In recent years, average temperatures in Rochester have ranged from a low of 15 °F (−9 °C) in January to a high of 84 °F (29 °C) in July, although a record low of −25 °F (−32 °C) was recorded in January 1985 and a record high of 103 °F (39 °C) was recorded in July 1980. Average monthly precipitation ranged from 1.74 inches (44 mm) in February to 4.16 inches (106 mm) in May.

== Government ==
The county government is a constitutional body, and is granted specific powers by the Constitution of Indiana, and by the Indiana Code.

County Council: The county council is the legislative branch of the county government and controls all the spending and revenue collection in the county. Representatives are elected from county districts. The council members serve four-year terms. They are responsible for setting salaries, the annual budget, and special spending. The council also has limited authority to impose local taxes, in the form of an income and property tax that is subject to state level approval, excise taxes, and service taxes.

Board of Commissioners: The executive body of the county is made of a board of commissioners. The commissioners are elected county-wide, in staggered terms, and each serves a four-year term. One of the commissioners, typically the most senior, serves as president. The commissioners are charged with executing the acts legislated by the council, collecting revenue, and managing the day-to-day functions of the county government.

Court: The county maintains a small claims court that can handle some civil cases. The judge on the court is elected to a term of four years and must be a member of the Indiana Bar Association. The judge is assisted by a constable who is also elected to a four-year term. In some cases, court decisions can be appealed to the state level circuit court.

County Officials: The county has several other elected offices, including sheriff, coroner, auditor, treasurer, recorder, surveyor, and circuit court clerk. Each of these elected officers serves a term of four years and oversees a different part of county government. Members elected to county government positions are required to declare party affiliations and to be residents of the county.

Fulton County is part of Indiana's 2nd congressional district and in 2015 was represented by Jackie Walorski in the United States Congress. It is also part of Indiana Senate district 18; and Indiana House of Representatives districts 16 and 23.

After a stretch of very narrow Democratic Party victories in the last four presidential elections of the 19th century, Fulton County became and has remained a Republican Party stronghold in presidential elections. The only exceptions to this have been Woodrow Wilson's plurality in 1912 thanks to a divided Republican vote and Franklin D. Roosevelts narrow majority in 1932 in the midst of his national landslide victory. FDR actually lost the county in 1936 even as Indiana as a whole was swept up in his 46-state landslide. The Democrats have only come reasonably close to carrying the county once since then, when Barry Goldwater won it over Lyndon Johnson by only 36 votes. This is one of only four times since 1936 that the Democrats have managed as much as 40 percent of the county's vote.

United States presidential election results for Fulton County, Indiana
Year	Republican		Democratic		Third party(ies)	
Year	No.	%	No.	%	No.	%
1888	2,053	47.79%	2,163	50.35%	80	1.86%
1892	2,053	46.06%	2,247	50.42%	157	3.52%
1896	2,349	49.00%	2,409	50.25%	36	0.75%
1900	2,313	48.49%	2,358	49.43%	99	2.08%
1904	2,394	50.02%	2,182	45.59%	210	4.39%
1908	2,426	49.34%	2,350	47.79%	141	2.87%
1912	1,427	32.18%	2,022	45.60%	985	22.21%
1916	2,325	48.72%	2,231	46.75%	216	4.53%
1920	4,618	53.99%	3,602	42.11%	334	3.90%
1924	4,329	55.53%	3,244	41.61%	223	2.86%
1928	4,627	61.09%	2,881	38.04%	66	0.87%
1932	3,787	43.42%	4,794	54.96%	141	1.62%
1936	4,541	50.43%	4,322	48.00%	141	1.57%
1940	5,532	58.40%	3,879	40.95%	61	0.64%
1944	5,190	61.28%	3,201	37.80%	78	0.92%
1948	4,930	58.70%	3,233	38.50%	235	2.80%
1952	6,247	68.09%	2,799	30.51%	129	1.41%
1956	6,258	67.59%	2,945	31.81%	56	0.60%
1960	6,038	66.11%	3,047	33.36%	48	0.53%
1964	4,410	50.01%	4,374	49.60%	34	0.39%
1968	5,145	60.72%	2,561	30.22%	768	9.06%
1972	6,170	73.82%	2,150	25.72%	38	0.45%
1976	5,083	58.41%	3,488	40.08%	132	1.52%
1980	5,458	62.53%	2,788	31.94%	482	5.52%
1984	6,057	70.14%	2,527	29.26%	51	0.59%
1988	5,234	65.01%	2,788	34.63%	29	0.36%
1992	3,982	46.70%	2,552	29.93%	1,993	23.37%
1996	3,934	48.75%	2,956	36.63%	1,180	14.62%
2000	5,218	62.66%	2,960	35.55%	149	1.79%
2004	6,027	69.25%	2,607	29.96%	69	0.79%
2008	5,147	57.15%	3,702	41.11%	157	1.74%
2012	5,317	65.43%	2,621	32.25%	188	2.31%
2016	6,010	71.23%	1,960	23.23%	467	5.54%
2020	6,694	73.18%	2,280	24.93%	173	1.89%
2024	6,633	74.73%	2,097	23.63%	146	1.64%

== Demographics ==
Historical population
Census	Pop.	Note	%±
1840	1,993		—
1850	5,982		200.2%
1860	9,422		57.5%
1870	12,726		35.1%
1880	14,301		12.4%
1890	16,746		17.1%
1900	17,453		4.2%
1910	16,879		−3.3%
1920	16,478		−2.4%
1930	15,038		−8.7%
1940	15,577		3.6%
1950	16,565		6.3%
1960	16,957		2.4%
1970	16,984		0.2%
1980	19,335		13.8%
1990	18,840		−2.6%
2000	20,511		8.9%
2010	20,836		1.6%
2020	20,480		−1.7%
2025 (est.)	20,091	▼	−1.9%
U.S. Decennial Census; 1790-1960 1900-1990; 1990-2000 2010

=== Racial and ethnic composition ===
Fulton County, Indiana – Racial and ethnic composition Note: the US Census treats Hispanic/Latino as an ethnic category. This table excludes Latinos from the racial categories and assigns them to a separate category. Hispanics/Latinos may be of any race.
Race / Ethnicity (NH = Non-Hispanic)	Pop 1980	Pop 1990	Pop 2000	Pop 2010	Pop 2020	% 1980	% 1990	% 2000	% 2010	% 2020
White alone (NH)	19,009	18,469	19,503	19,438	18,452	98.31%	98.03%	95.09%	93.29%	90.10%
Black or African American alone (NH)	155	151	154	144	141	0.80%	0.80%	0.75%	0.69%	0.69%
Native American or Alaska Native alone (NH)	39	47	76	73	64	0.20%	0.25%	0.37%	0.35%	0.31%
Asian alone (NH)	39	33	76	101	76	0.20%	0.18%	0.37%	0.48%	0.37%
Native Hawaiian or Pacific Islander alone (NH)	x	x	5	5	0	x	x	0.02%	0.02%	0.00%
Other race alone (NH)	8	5	8	8	43	0.04%	0.03%	0.04%	0.04%	0.21%
Mixed race or Multiracial (NH)	x	x	216	185	636	x	x	1.05%	0.89%	3.11%
Hispanic or Latino (any race)	85	135	473	882	1,068	0.44%	0.72%	2.31%	4.23%	5.21%
Total	19,335	18,840	20,511	20,836	20,480	100.00%	100.00%	100.00%	100.00%	100.00%

=== 2020 census ===
As of the 2020 census, the county had a population of 20,480. The median age was 41.9 years. 23.9% of residents were under the age of 18 and 20.1% of residents were 65 years of age or older. For every 100 females there were 98.8 males, and for every 100 females age 18 and over there were 96.6 males age 18 and over.

The racial makeup of the county was 92.0% White, 0.7% Black or African American, 0.4% American Indian and Alaska Native, 0.4% Asian, <0.1% Native Hawaiian and Pacific Islander, 1.7% from some other race, and 4.7% from two or more races. Hispanic or Latino residents of any race comprised 5.2% of the population.

35.8% of residents lived in urban areas, while 64.2% lived in rural areas.

There were 8,209 households in the county, of which 29.8% had children under the age of 18 living in them. Of all households, 51.6% were married-couple households, 17.2% were households with a male householder and no spouse or partner present, and 23.4% were households with a female householder and no spouse or partner present. About 27.5% of all households were made up of individuals and 13.4% had someone living alone who was 65 years of age or older.

There were 9,532 housing units, of which 13.9% were vacant. Among occupied housing units, 76.6% were owner-occupied and 23.4% were renter-occupied. The homeowner vacancy rate was 1.6% and the rental vacancy rate was 5.9%.

=== 2010 census ===
As of the 2010 United States census, there were 20,836 people, 8,237 households, and 5,736 families residing in the county. The population density was 56.6 inhabitants per square mile (21.9/km^{2}). There were 9,708 housing units at an average density of 26.4 per square mile (10.2/km^{2}). The racial makeup of the county was 95.0% white, 0.7% black or African American, 0.5% Asian, 0.5% American Indian, 2.2% from other races, and 1.1% from two or more races. Those of Hispanic or Latino origin made up 4.2% of the population. In terms of ancestry, 28.7% were German, 19.0% were American, 10.9% were Irish, and 10.0% were English. Those citing "American" ancestry in Fulton County are of overwhelmingly English extraction, however most English Americans identify simply as having American ancestry because their roots have been in North America for so long, in some cases since the 1600s.

Of the 8,237 households, 32.2% had children under the age of 18 living with them, 54.2% were married couples living together, 10.2% had a female householder with no husband present, 30.4% were non-families, and 25.8% of all households were made up of individuals. The average household size was 2.50 and the average family size was 2.97. The median age was 40.3 years.

The median income for a household in the county was $47,697 and the median income for a family was $47,972. Males had a median income of $40,110 versus $28,417 for females. The per capita income for the county was $21,119. About 8.5% of families and 11.3% of the population were below the poverty line, including 15.1% of those under age 18 and 6.9% of those age 65 or over.

== Education ==
Public schools in Fulton County are administered by the Caston School Corporation, the Rochester Community School Corporation, Culver Community School Corporation, and the Tippecanoe Valley School Corporation.

High Schools and Middle Schools

- Caston Jr./Sr. High School
- Rochester Community High School
- Rochester Middle School
- Tippecanoe Valley High School
- Tippecanoe Valley Middle School

Elementary Schools

- Akron Elementary
- Caston Elementary School
- Columbia Elementary School
- Riddle Elementary School

== See also ==
- National Register of Historic Places listings in Fulton County, Indiana
