= National Register of Historic Places listings in Marshall County, Indiana =

Location of Marshall County in Indiana

This is a list of the National Register of Historic Places listings in Marshall County, Indiana.

This is intended to be a complete list of the properties and districts on the National Register of Historic Places in Marshall County, Indiana, United States. Latitude and longitude coordinates are provided for many National Register properties and districts; these locations may be seen together on a map.

There are 33 properties and districts listed on the National Register in the county. Another three properties were once listed but have been removed.

Properties and districts located in incorporated areas display the name of the municipality, while properties and districts in unincorporated areas display the name of their civil township. Properties and districts split between multiple jurisdictions display the names of all jurisdictions.

This National Park Service list is complete through NPS recent listings posted April 24, 2026.

== Current listings ==
| | Name on the Register | Image | Date listed | Location | City or town | Description |
|---|---|---|---|---|---|---|
| 1 | Argos Downtown Historic District | Argos Downtown Historic District | September 16, 2001 (#01000991) | Western side of Michigan St. between Smith and Williams, and the eastern side between Smith and Walnut; 41°14′12″N 86°14′43″W | Argos | |
| 2 | Argos Izaak Walton League Historic District | Argos Izaak Walton League Historic District | December 15, 2011 (#11000914) | 7184 E. 16th Rd., east of Argos; 41°14′43″N 86°11′44″W | Walnut Township | |
| 3 | Argos Northside Historic District | Argos Northside Historic District | September 18, 2017 (#100001613) | N. Michigan St. between Smith and north of North St., and Maple St. between Church and Poplar Sts. 41°14′28″N 86°14′47″W | Argos | |
| 4 | Isaac and Ruth Arnold House | | September 4, 2018 (#100002864) | 1003 N. Main St. 41°18′11″N 86°06′59″W | Bourbon | |
| 5 | Lewis and Sarah Boggs House | Lewis and Sarah Boggs House | June 15, 2012 (#12000337) | 9564 14th Rd., north of Argos; 41°16′29″N 86°14′33″W | Center Township | |
| 6 | Bourbon Commercial Historic District | Bourbon Commercial Historic District | June 12, 2017 (#100001061) | Parts of Main and Center Sts. 41°17′44″N 86°06′58″W | Bourbon | |
| 7 | Bourbon Residential Historic District | Bourbon Residential Historic District | June 12, 2017 (#100001062) | Main between Park and Shaffer Sts. in blocks bounded by Sunset St. and Park Ave. between Thompson and Harris Sts., and also along Park Ave. 41°17′59″N 86°06′58″W | Bourbon | |
| 8 | Bremen Commercial Historic District | Bremen Commercial Historic District | March 7, 2017 (#100000715) | Between Jackson, Washington, North, and South Sts. 41°26′47″N 86°08′46″W | Bremen | |
| 9 | Bremen Residential Historic District | Bremen Residential Historic District | March 7, 2017 (#100000716) | Between Bowen, Montgomery, South, and Bike Sts. 41°26′51″N 86°09′10″W | Bremen | |
| 10 | Bremen Water Tower | Bremen Water Tower | January 9, 2013 (#12001152) | Western side of the 100 block of S. Jackson St. 41°26′46″N 86°08′52″W | Bremen | |
| 11 | Center Street Stone & Concrete Arch Bridge | | March 2, 2026 (#100012761) | Center Street over Armey Ditch; 41°27′04″N 86°08′47″W | Bremen vicinity | |
| 12 | Culver Commercial Historic District | Culver Commercial Historic District | January 11, 1996 (#95001530) | Roughly bounded by Washington St., the north-south alley east of Main St., Madison St., and Ohio St. 41°13′00″N 86°25′25″W | Culver | |
| 13 | Dietrich-Bowen House | Dietrich-Bowen House | November 21, 1978 (#78000023) | 304 N. Center St. 41°26′54″N 86°08′46″W | Bremen | |
| 14 | East Laporte Street Footbridge | East Laporte Street Footbridge | July 23, 1981 (#81000001) | Spans the Yellow River; 41°20′25″N 86°18′15″W | Plymouth | |
| 15 | East Shore Historic District | East Shore Historic District | August 14, 1998 (#98001054) | Roughly E. Shore Dr. southeast of Culver from W. 18th Rd., to the eastern turn of State Road 117, including Maxinkuckee Country Club; 41°12′10″N 86°23′27″W | Union Township | |
| 16 | Erwin House | Erwin House | March 15, 2016 (#16000080) | 2518 14-B Rd. 41°16′01″N 86°06′18″W | Tippecanoe Township | |
| 17 | Forest Place Historic District | Forest Place Historic District | June 15, 2000 (#00000671) | Forest Place, between College Ave. and Lake Shore Dr. 41°13′14″N 86°25′01″W | Culver | |
| 18 | Gaskill-Erwin Farm | Gaskill-Erwin Farm | March 17, 2015 (#15000078) | 2595 14-B Rd. 41°15′59″N 86°06′23″W | Tippecanoe Township | |
| 19 | Heminger Travel Lodge | Heminger Travel Lodge | January 11, 2001 (#00001629) | 800 Lincolnway East; 41°20′35″N 86°17′59″W | Plymouth | |
| 20 | Hoham-Klinghammer-Weckerle House and Brewery Site | Hoham-Klinghammer-Weckerle House and Brewery Site | June 15, 2012 (#12000338) | 1715 Lake Ave. 41°20′07″N 86°19′43″W | Center Township and Plymouth | |
| 21 | Jacoby Church and Cemetery | Jacoby Church and Cemetery | January 25, 2007 (#06001291) | Western side of N. King Rd., south of 8A Rd. and east of Plymouth; 41°21′16″N 86°15′42″W | Center Township | |
| 22 | Marshall County Court House | Marshall County Court House | June 30, 1983 (#83000139) | 117 W. Jefferson St. 41°20′37″N 86°18′40″W | Plymouth | |
| 23 | Marshall County Infirmary | Marshall County Infirmary | October 9, 2000 (#00001139) | 10924 Lincoln Highway, southeast of Plymouth; 41°19′58″N 86°16′08″W | Center Township | |
| 24 | Chief Menominee Memorial Site | Chief Menominee Memorial Site | December 27, 2010 (#10001082) | S. Peach Rd., north of W. 13th Rd. and southwest of Plymouth; 41°17′43″N 86°21′43″W | West Township | |
| 25 | Norris Farm-Maxinkuckee Orchard | Norris Farm-Maxinkuckee Orchard | June 7, 2016 (#16000337) | 18799 Peach Rd. 41°12′21″N 86°21′52″W | Union Township | |
| 26 | Plymouth Downtown Historic District | Plymouth Downtown Historic District | December 17, 1998 (#98001524) | Roughly bounded by Center, Washington, and Water Sts., and the Yellow River; also 110, 112, 116, 120 Washington, 101 Michigan & the blk. bounded by Garro, Water, LaPorte & Michigan Sts. 41°20′27″N 86°18′34″W | Plymouth | |
| 27 | Plymouth Northside Historic District | Plymouth Northside Historic District | September 25, 2013 (#13000760) | Center and Michigan Sts. between Adams and Novelty Sts., and the blocks surrounding the courthouse square 41°20′42″N 86°18′40″W | Plymouth | |
| 28 | Plymouth Southside Historic District | Plymouth Southside Historic District | December 31, 2013 (#13001016) | S. Michigan St. roughly bounded by the former Pennsylvania Railroad line and Oakhill Ave. 41°20′11″N 86°18′25″W | Plymouth | |
| 29 | Plymouth Fire Station | Plymouth Fire Station | July 9, 1981 (#81000002) | 220 N. Center St. 41°20′29″N 86°18′37″W | Plymouth | |
| 30 | Polk Township District No. 2 School | Polk Township District No. 2 School | January 9, 2013 (#12001153) | 18998 W. 2A Rd., southeast of Walkerton; 41°26′40″N 86°25′30″W | Polk Township | |
| 31 | Ramsay-Fox Round Barn and Farm | Ramsay-Fox Round Barn and Farm | April 10, 2012 (#12000187) | 18889 9th Rd., west of Plymouth; 41°20′45″N 86°25′20″W | West Township | |
| 32 | Sults-Quivey-Hartman Polygonal Barn and Farm | Sults-Quivey-Hartman Polygonal Barn and Farm | September 3, 2019 (#100004367) | 15605 S. Olive Trail; 41°15′03″N 86°20′16″W | Plymouth | |
| 33 | Tippecanoe Twp. District No. 3 Schoolhouse and Cemetery | Tippecanoe Twp. District No. 3 Schoolhouse and Cemetery | June 24, 2008 (#08000567) | State Road 10 at Birch Rd., northeast of Tippecanoe; 41°14′44″N 86°05′05″W | Tippecanoe Township | |

== Former listings ==
| | Name on the Register | Image | Date listed | Date removed | Location | City or town | Description |
|---|---|---|---|---|---|---|---|
| 1 | Bourbon Community Building-Gymnasium | Bourbon Community Building-Gymnasium | December 15, 2015 (#15000888) | May 13, 2021 | 800 N. Harris St. 41°18′08″N 86°06′48″W | Bourbon | Demolished in 2020 |
| 2 | Marshall County Jail | | October 25, 1973 (#73000250) | October 13, 1983 | 601 N. Center St. | Plymouth | |
| 3 | Woodbank | Woodbank | December 2, 1982 (#82000022) | September 5, 2014 | 2738 East Shore Lane, along Lake Maxinkuckee southeast of Culver; 41°11′25″N 86°23′36″W | Union Township | |

== See also ==
- List of National Historic Landmarks in Indiana
- National Register of Historic Places listings in Indiana
- Listings in neighboring counties: Elkhart, Fulton, Kosciusko, Pulaski, St. Joseph, Starke
- List of Indiana state historical markers in Marshall County
