= Indiana State Road 110 =

State highway in Indiana, United States

State Road 110
- SR 110 highlighted in red

Route information
- Maintained by INDOT
- Length: 18.880 mi (30.384 km)

Western segment
- Length: 2.485 mi (3.999 km)
- West end: SR 10 at Deer Park
- East end: US 231 at Kniman

Eastern segment
- Length: 16.395 mi (26.385 km)
- West end: SR 17 near Culver
- Major intersections: US 31 at Walnut
- East end: SR 25 at Talma

Location
- Country: United States
- State: Indiana
- Counties: Fulton, Jasper, Marshall

Highway system
- Indiana State Highway System; Interstate; US; State; Scenic
← SR 109	→ SR 111

State Road 110 (SR 110) is an east–west state road, that consists of two discontinuous sections, in the northern part of the US state of Indiana. The western portion of SR 110 is just under 2.5 miles (4.0 km) long and connects SR 10 with U.S. Route 231 (US 231) in Jasper County. The eastern portion runs along the border between Fulton County and Marshall County; it is approximately 16.4 miles (26.4 km) long and connects SR 17 at the west end with SR 25 at the east end. Neither segment passes through any towns or cities and passes through mostly rural agriculture land.

The SR 110 designation was first used in the early 1940s along the modern route of SR 110 in Jasper County. The eastern segment was added by the mid-1940s, running between SR 17 and US 31. The eastern terminus became SR 25 by the mid-1950s and the entire roadway was paved by the mid-1960s.

== Route description ==
=== Western segment ===
The western segment of SR 110 begins at an intersection with SR 10 and SR 110 head east passing through agriculture land. The road has an intersection with a county road before an intersection with US 231. The SR 110 designation ends at US 231 but the roadway continues east as a county road. The highest traffic count for the western segment of SR 110 in 2015 was at its western end, where 4,299 vehicles travel the highway on average each day. The lowest traffic count during 2015 was at the eastern end of the western segment of SR 110, where 3,714 vehicles travel the highway on average each day.

=== Eastern segment ===
The eastern segment of SR 110 begins at an intersection with SR 17. SR 110 heads east along the Fulton-Marshall county line having an intersection with the southern end of SR 117. The road continues east passing through farmland, before an intersection with US 31. The road crosses a railroad track, while the landscape along the road become more woodland. SR 110 crosses over the Tippecanoe River before bending southeast off of the county line and into Fulton County. In Fulton County SR 110 ends at an intersection with SR 25, just west of an intersection between SR 25 and SR 331. The highest traffic count for the eastern segment of SR 110 in 2016 was just west of US 31, where 1,414 vehicles travel the highway on average each day. The lowest traffic count during 2016 was at the western end of the eastern segment of SR 110, where 984 vehicles travel the highway on average each day.

== History ==
The first segment of SR 110 to be designation is the western segment designated in either 1941 or 1942. At the time of designation SR 110 was routed along its modern routing between SR 10 and SR 53, now US 231. The eastern section was added to the state road system between 1942 and 1945, originally routed along modern SR 110 from SR 17 to US 31. SR 110 was extended east to SR 25 between 1953 and 1956. The entire route was paved in either 1963 or 1964.

== Major intersections ==
County	Location	mi	km	Destinations	Notes
Jasper	Keener Township	0.000	0.000	SR 10	Western terminus of SR 110
Jasper	Walker Township	2.485	3.999	US 231 – Crown Point, Rensselaer	Eastern terminus of the western section of SR 110
Gap in route
Marshall–Fulton county line	Union–Aubbeenaubbee township line	2.486	4.001	SR 17 – Logansport, Plymouth	Western terminus of the eastern section of SR 110
Marshall–Fulton county line	Union–Aubbeenaubbee township line	5.324	8.568	SR 117 north – Maxinkuckee	Southern terminus of SR 117
Marshall–Fulton county line	Walnut–Richland township line	12.552	20.200	US 31 – Indianapolis, South Bend	
Fulton	Newcastle Township	18.880	30.384	SR 25 – Rochester, Talma, Warsaw, Mentone	Eastern terminus of SR 110
1.000 mi = 1.609 km; 1.000 km = 0.621 mi
