= List of Indiana state historical markers in Marshall County =

Location of Marshall County in Indiana

This is a list of the Indiana state historical markers in Marshall County.

This is intended to be a complete list of the official state historical markers placed in Marshall County, Indiana, United States by the Indiana Historical Bureau. The locations of the historical markers and their latitude and longitude coordinates are included below when available, along with their names, years of placement, and topics as recorded by the Historical Bureau. There are 3 historical markers located in Marshall County.

== Historical markers ==
| Marker title | Image | Year placed | Location | Topics |
|---|---|---|---|---|
| Trail of Death | | 1949 | Junction of State Road 17 and County Road 12, 1.3 miles northeast of the junction of State Roads 8 and 17, and 2 miles west of Twin Lakes; 41°18′10″N 86°24′26″W | American Indian/Native American, Military |
| Second Principal Meridian | | 1966 | 1.6 miles west of the junction of State Roads 17 and 110 on the northern side of Marshall County Line Road/Fulton County Road 1200W/Pulaski County Road 800N/Starke County Road 900S; 41°10′17.4″N 86°28′1″W | Early Settlement and Exploration |
| Benack's Village | | 2011 | Potawatomi Wildlife Park, 16998 IN-331, Bourbon; 41°13′50.9″N 86°06′19.3″W | American Indian, Early Settlement and Exploration |

== See also ==
- List of Indiana state historical markers
- National Register of Historic Places listings in Marshall County, Indiana
