= Jessie Hull Mayer =

American painter and muralist

- Born: Jessie Hull; July 28, 1910; New Haven, Connecticut
- Died: July 1, 2009 (aged 98); Essex, Connecticut
- Occupation: artist
- Years active: 1932–1993
- Known for: United States post office murals, maritime scenes

Jessie Hull Mayer (July 28, 1910 – July 1, 2009) was an American painter and muralist who won four federal commissions to complete post office murals, as part of the Section of Painting and Sculpture′s projects, later called the Section of Fine Arts, of the Treasury Department. She continued to paint after the New Deal art projects ended, focusing on botanicals, landscapes and maritime themes.

== Early life ==
Jessie Hull was born July 28, 1910, in New Haven, Connecticut, to Anna (née Goetz) and William H. Hull. Her family had several farms in New Haven County, Connecticut, and as a child, she spent time at the farms in Branford and North Haven. After completing her education at Mrs. Day's School in 1927, Hull enrolled in the Yale School of Fine Arts to study with Eugene Savage. While attending Yale, she met Henrik Martin Mayer. They were married at the family farm, Shepherds Point in Branford, on July 2, 1932, soon after her graduation with a bachelor's degree in fine arts. The couple lived in New York City for a year after their marriage and then moved to Indianapolis, Indiana.

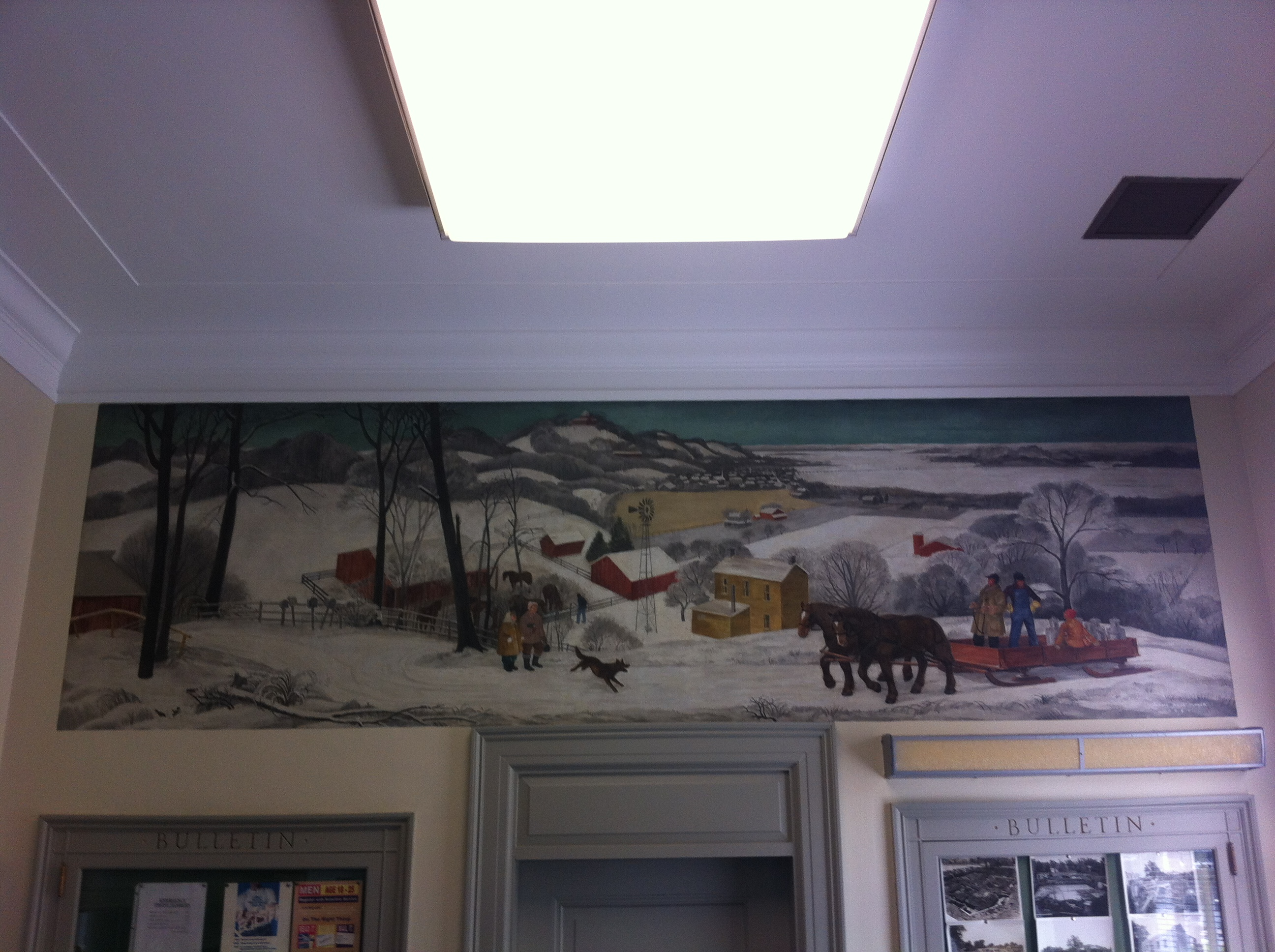
Mural in Canton, MO post office

== Career ==
While the couple was in New York, they worked together on a project to decorate the New York Cosmopolitan Club. Henrik was the lead designer on the project for the solarium murals and Mayer assisted him. In Indianapolis, Mayer began working as a curator at the Indianapolis Museum of Art and painted four murals for the Section of Painting and Sculpture. She entered the competition for the post office in Lafayette, Indiana, but lost the commission to her husband. Instead, she was given the commission to paint the mural for the post office in Culver. Arrival of the Mail in Culver was completed in 1938 and featured students from the military academy and other residents looking at their mail. The post office and mural have been designated as part of the Culver Commercial Historic District on the National Register of Historic Places.

In 1939, Mayer won a second commission to paint the mural for the post office in Jasper, Indiana. Indiana Farming Scene in Late Autumn depicts a harvest scene on a farmstead, with no indication of the town. The oil on canvas painting was featured in a 1975 film, Art for Main Street: The Indiana Post Office Murals, produced by the Indiana Historical Society. Her third successful mural proposal was for the post office in Canton, Missouri. Mayer's oil and tempera painting, Winter Landscape was installed in 1940 and had restoration work completed in both 1971 and 2005. In 1941, Mayer's mural Corn School was hung in the post office in LaGrange, Indiana. The mural depicts the LaGrange County Courthouse and the annual fall festival hosted by the town.

After World War II, the couple relocated to Essex, Connecticut, where Mayer continued to paint, focusing on botanical, landscape and marine subjects. She participated in gallery showings as well as juried exhibits, until at least 1993.

== Death and legacy ==
Mayer died on July 1, 2009, in Essex.
