= Indiana State Road 117 =

State highway in Indiana, United States

State Road 117
- East Shore Drive
- SR 117 highlighted in red

Route information
- Maintained by INDOT
- Length: 4.434 mi (7.136 km)

Major junctions
- South end: SR 110 southeast of Culver
- North end: SR 10 east of Culver

Location
- Country: United States
- State: Indiana
- Counties: Marshall

Highway system
- Indiana State Highway System; Interstate; US; State; Scenic
← SR 116	→ SR 119

State Road 117 (SR 117) is a state road in the northern section of the U.S. state of Indiana. Running for about 4.4 miles (7.1 km) in a general north–south direction, connecting Lake Maxinkuckee to SR 110 and SR 10, in Marshall County. SR 117 was originally introduced in the early 1950s routed along its modern routing. The road was paved in the 1960s.

== Route description ==
SR 117 starts at an intersection with SR 110, at the Fulton–Marshall county line, southeast of Culver. The highway heads north, passing between a golf course and farmland, before curving and becoming an east–west roadway. The roadway heads west towards Lake Maxinkuckee, before another curve turning the road back towards the north. North of the curve the road runs along the east side of the lake, passing by mostly houses. As the lake ends, SR 117 passes through Culver Military Academy, before ending at an intersection with SR 10, east of Culver. The highest traffic count for SR 117 in 2015 was at its northern end, where 1,215 vehicles travel the highway on average each day. The lowest traffic count during 2015 was at the southern end of SR 117, where 474 vehicles travel the highway on average each day.

== History ==
Indiana State Highway Commission added SR 117 to the state system between 1950 and 1951, running along its modern routing. The entire roadway was paved between 1962 and 1963. No major changes have occurred to SR 117 since it was paved.

== Major intersections ==
The entire route is in Union Township, Marshall County.

mi	km	Destinations	Notes
0.000	0.000	SR 110	Southern terminus of SR 117
4.434	7.136	SR 10	Northern terminus of SR 117
1.000 mi = 1.609 km; 1.000 km = 0.621 mi
