= Woodbank =

Woodbank may refer to:

United Kingdom

- Woodbank, Cheshire, a village
- Woodbank, Stockport, a villa and garden in Greater Manchester
- Woodbank, a listed building in Partickhill, Glasgow, Scotland

United States

- Woodbank (Culver, Indiana), listed on the National Register of Historic Places
