= Center Township, Marshall County, Indiana =

Center Township
- Township
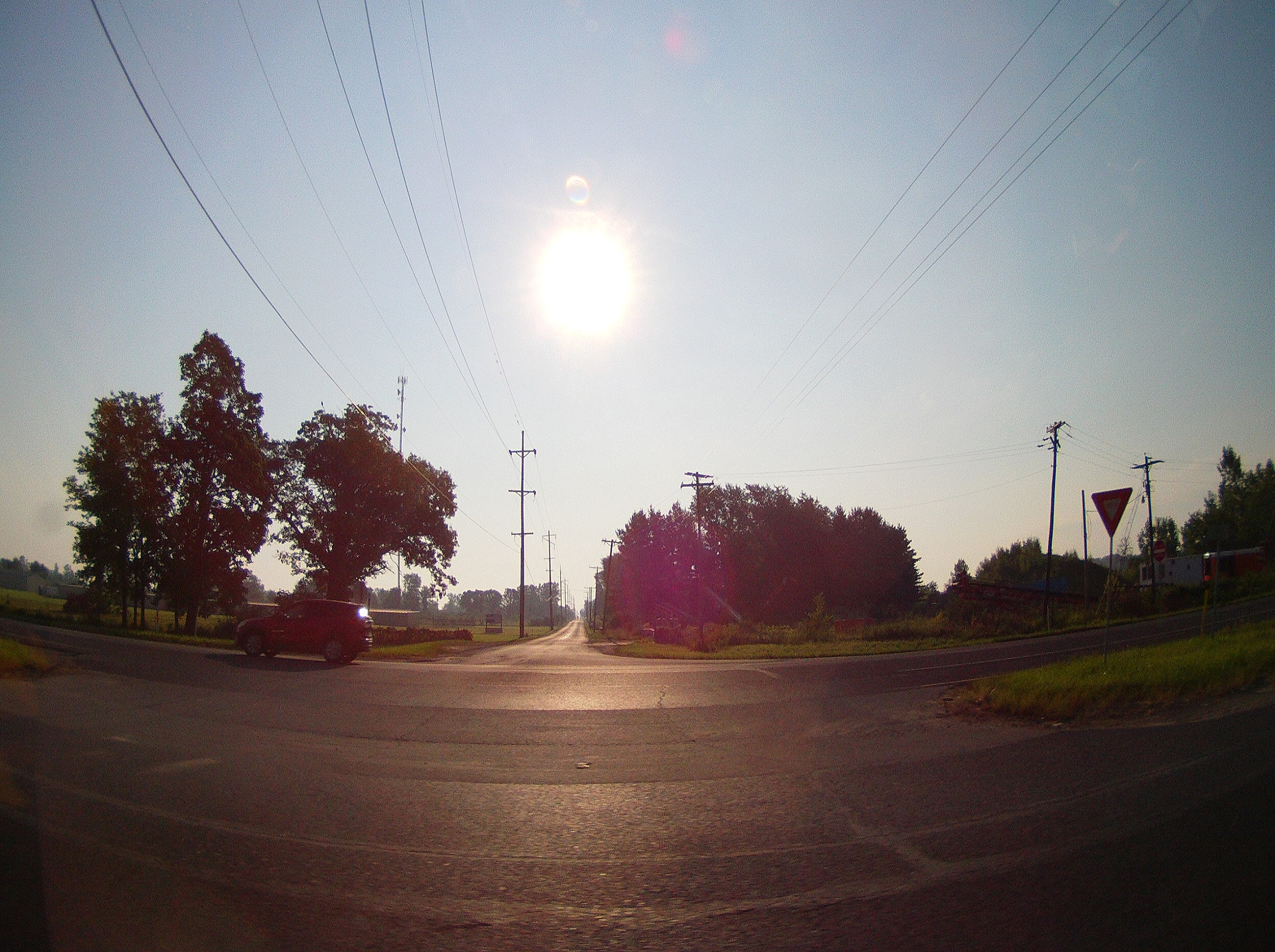
- Intersection of U.S. 31 and 11th Road, in Center Township

- Location in Marshall County
- Coordinates: 41°19′53″N 86°16′07″W
- Country: United States
- State: Indiana
- County: Marshall

Government
  - Type: Indiana township

Area
  - Total: 59.79 sq mi (154.9 km^{2})
  - Land: 59.31 sq mi (153.6 km^{2})
  - Water: 0.48 sq mi (1.2 km^{2}) 0.80%
- Elevation: 827 ft (252 m)

Population (2020)
  - Total: 15,601
  - Density: 262.9/sq mi (101.5/km^{2})
- ZIP codes: 46501, 46504, 46563
- GNIS feature ID: 0453187

Center Township is one of ten townships in Marshall County, Indiana, United States. As of the 2020 census, its population was 15,601 (up from 15,593 at 2010) and it contained 6,447 housing units.

Center Township was established in 1836.

== Geography ==
According to the 2010 census, the township has a total area of 59.79 square miles (154.9 km^{2}), of which 59.31 square miles (153.6 km^{2}) (or 99.20%) is land and 0.48 square miles (1.2 km^{2}) (or 0.80%) is water.

=== Cities, towns, villages ===
- Plymouth (vast majority)

=== Unincorporated towns ===
- Inwood at 41.317545°N 86.203058°W

(This list is based on USGS data and may include former settlements.)

=== Cemeteries ===
The township contains these five cemeteries: Nighthart, Oak Hill, Saint Michaels, Salem and Tabor.

=== Major highways ===
- US 30
- US 31
- SR 17

=== Airports and landing strips ===
- Plymouth Municipal Airport
- Tri State Airport

=== Lakes ===
- Dixon Lake
- Lawrence Lake

=== Landmarks ===
- Centennial Park
- The Lewis and Sarah Boggs House, Jacoby Church and Cemetery, Marshall County Infirmary, and Hoham-Klinghammer-Weckerle House and Brewery Site are listed on the National Register of Historic Places.

== Education ==
- Plymouth Community School Corporation

Center Township residents may obtain a free library card from the Plymouth Public Library in Plymouth.

== Political districts ==
- Indiana's 2nd congressional district
- State House District 17
- State Senate District 5
