= East Shore Historic District =

Historic district in Indiana, United States

- U.S. National Register of Historic Places
- U.S. Historic district
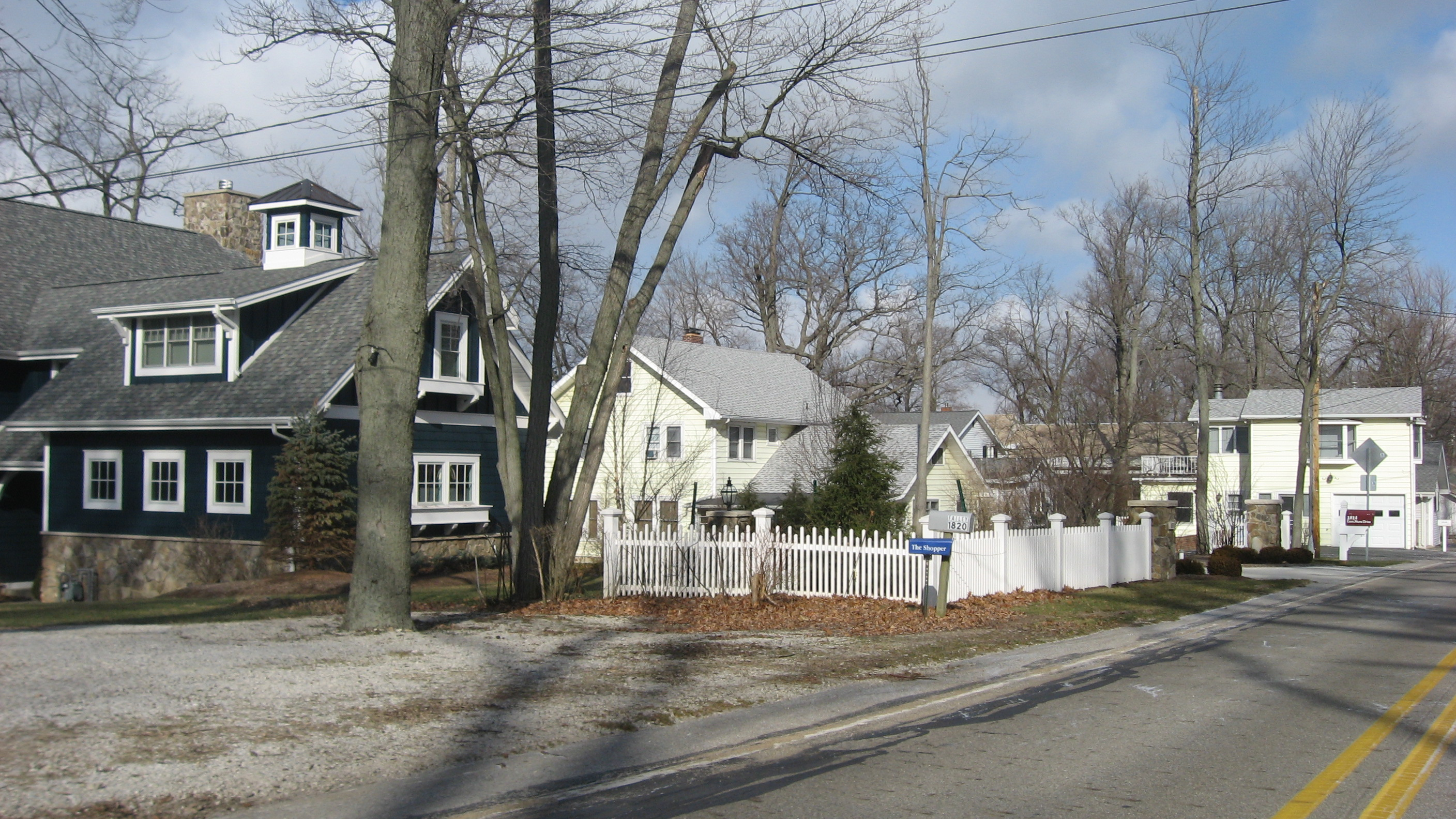
- East Lake Shore Drive off Maxinkuckee, January 2013

- Location within Indiana Location within the United States
- Location: Roughly E. Shore Dr. southeast of Culver from W. 18th Rd., to the eastern turn of State Road 117, including Maxinkuckee Country Club, Union Township, Marshall County, Indiana
- Coordinates: 41°12′10″N 86°23′27″W
- Area: 1,860 acres (750 ha)
- Architectural style: Late Victorian, Colonial Revival, Bungalow/craftsman
- MPS: Historic Resources of the Culver-Lake Maxinkuckee Area MPS
- NRHP reference No.: 98001054
- Added to NRHP: August 14, 1998

East Shore Historic District, also known as Lake Maxinkuckee Historic District, is a national historic district located in Union Township, Marshall County, Indiana. The district encompasses 114 contributing buildings, 3 contributing sites, and 1 contributing structure in a resort development along the shore of Lake Maxinkuckee. It developed between about 1873 and 1945, and includes examples of Late Victorian, Colonial Revival, and Bungalow / American Craftsman style architecture. The district includes Maxinkuckee Country Club. Notable buildings include the Norris Farmhouse (Maple Grove Hotel), Trone Cottage (c. 1920), Roach-Rockwood Cottage (c. 1923), Elliott Cottage (c. 1875), Gates-Holliday Cottage (1897), Marmon Cottage (c. 1880), and Norman Perry House.

It was listed in the National Register of Historic Places in 1998.
