= Teegarden, Indiana =

- Census-designated place
- Location within Indiana Location within the United States
- Coordinates: 41°27′54″N 86°22′39″W
- Country: United States
- State: Indiana
- County: Marshall
- Township: Polk

Area
  - Total: 0.10 sq mi (0.26 km^{2})
  - Land: 0.10 sq mi (0.26 km^{2})
  - Water: 0.0 sq mi (0 km^{2})
- Elevation: 787 ft (240 m)
- ZIP code: 46574 (Walkerton)
- FIPS code: 18-75194
- GNIS feature ID: 444620

Teegarden is an unincorporated community and census-designated place (CDP) in Polk Township, Marshall County, Indiana, United States.

== History ==
Teegarden was platted in 1873. Teegarden has the last name of a family of settlers.

== Geography ==
Teegarden is located in northwestern Marshall County, 1 mile (1.6 km) north of U.S. Route 6, 5 miles (8 km) east of Walkerton, and 11 miles (18 km) north-northwest of Plymouth, the Marshall county seat.

The Teegarden CDP as defined by the U.S. Census Bureau has an area of 0.10 square miles (0.26 km^{2}), all land. The community drains northwest toward Yellow Bank Creek, flowing west toward the Kankakee River, part of the Illinois River watershed.

== Demographics ==
Historical population
Census	Pop.	Note	%±
2023 (est.)	34

The United States Census Bureau defined Teegarden as a census designated place in the 2022 American Community Survey.
