= Tyner, Indiana =

- Census-designated place
- Location within Indiana Location within the United States
- Coordinates: 41°24′35″N 86°24′09″W
- Country: United States
- State: Indiana
- County: Marshall
- Township: Polk
- Established

Area
  - Total: 0.10 sq mi (0.26 km^{2})
  - Land: 0.10 sq mi (0.26 km^{2})
  - Water: 0.0 sq mi (0 km^{2})
- Elevation: 804 ft (245 m)
- ZIP code: 46572
- FIPS code: 18-77030
- GNIS feature ID: 449740

Tyner is an unincorporated community and census-designated place (CDP) in Polk Township, Marshall County, Indiana, United States. Originally named "Tyner City", it is named after Thomas Tyner, who died in 1880 and is buried in the town's cemetery.

== History ==
Tyner was originally called "Tyner City", and under the latter name was platted in 1855. It was named for one of its founders, Thomas Tyner. The post office was called "Tyner City" from 1856 until 1894, when it was renamed Tyner.

== Geography ==
Tyner is located in northwestern Marshall County at 41°24′35″N 86°24′09″W. Several of the streets of Tyner are named after the main thoroughfares in Cincinnati. Tyner is 8 miles (13 km) northwest of Plymouth, the county seat, and the same distance southeast of Walkerton.

According to the U.S. Census Bureau, the Tyner CDP has an area of 0.40 square miles (1.04 km^{2}), of which 0.001 square miles (0.003 km^{2}), or 0.02%, are water. The community drains northwest toward tributaries of Pine Creek, which continues northwest to the Kankakee River beyond Walkerton.

== Demographics ==
Historical population
Census	Pop.	Note	%±
2023 (est.)	224

The United States Census Bureau defined Tyner as a census designated place in the 2022 American Community Survey.

== Notable people ==
- Lambert Hillyer, film director
- Lydia Knott, film actress
- Scott Skiles, NBA player and coach
