= Woodbank (Culver, Indiana) =

Historic house in Indiana, United States

- Formerly listed on the U.S. National Register of Historic Places
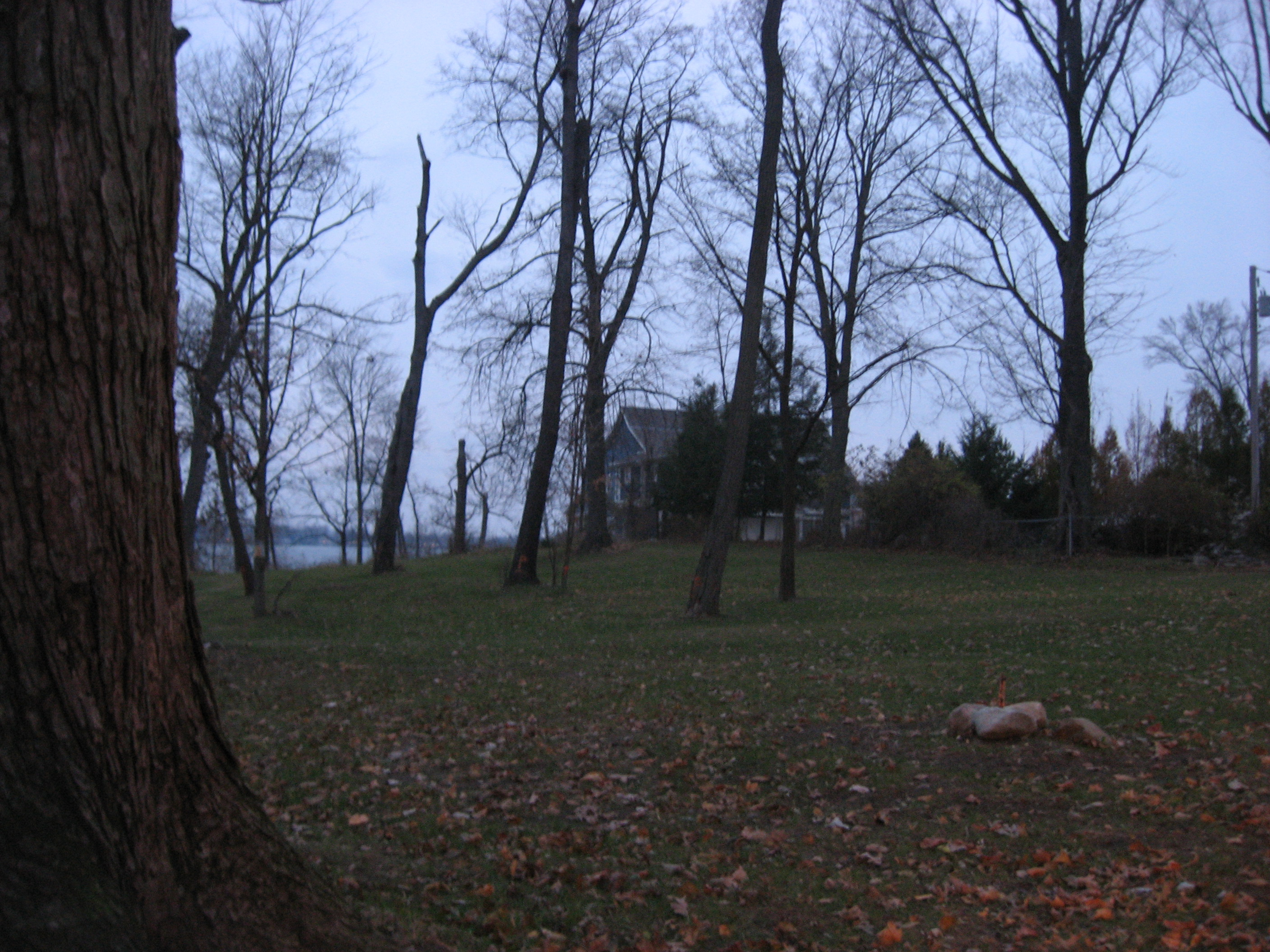
- Site of the cottage

- Location within Indiana Location within the United States
- Location: 2738 East Shore Lane, along Lake Maxinkuckee southeast of Culver, Indiana
- Coordinates: 41°11′25″N 86°23′36″W
- Built: 1894
- Architectural style: Late Victorian
- NRHP reference No.: 82000022

Significant dates
- Added to NRHP: December 2, 1982
- Removed from NRHP: September 5, 2014

Woodbank, also known as Rasmussen Cottage, was a historic home located on Lake Maxinkuckee in Union Township, Marshall County, Indiana. It was a 2 1/2-story, Late Victorian style summer cottage built in 1894. It has been demolished.

It was listed on the National Register of Historic Places in 1982, and removed in 2014.
