= Burr Oak, Marshall County, Indiana =

Burr Oak, Indiana
- Unincorporated community
- Location within Indiana Location within the United States
- Coordinates: 41°15′23″N 86°24′55″W
- Country: United States
- State: Indiana
- County: Marshall
- Township: Union
- Elevation: 774 ft (236 m)
- ZIP code: 46511
- FIPS code: 18-09424
- GNIS feature ID: 449628

Burr Oak is an unincorporated community in Union Township, Marshall County, Indiana.

Burr Oak was platted in 1882.

== Geography ==
Burr Oak is located at 41°15′23″N 86°24′55″W.
