= Lewis and Sarah Boggs House =

Historic house in Indiana, United States

- U.S. National Register of Historic Places
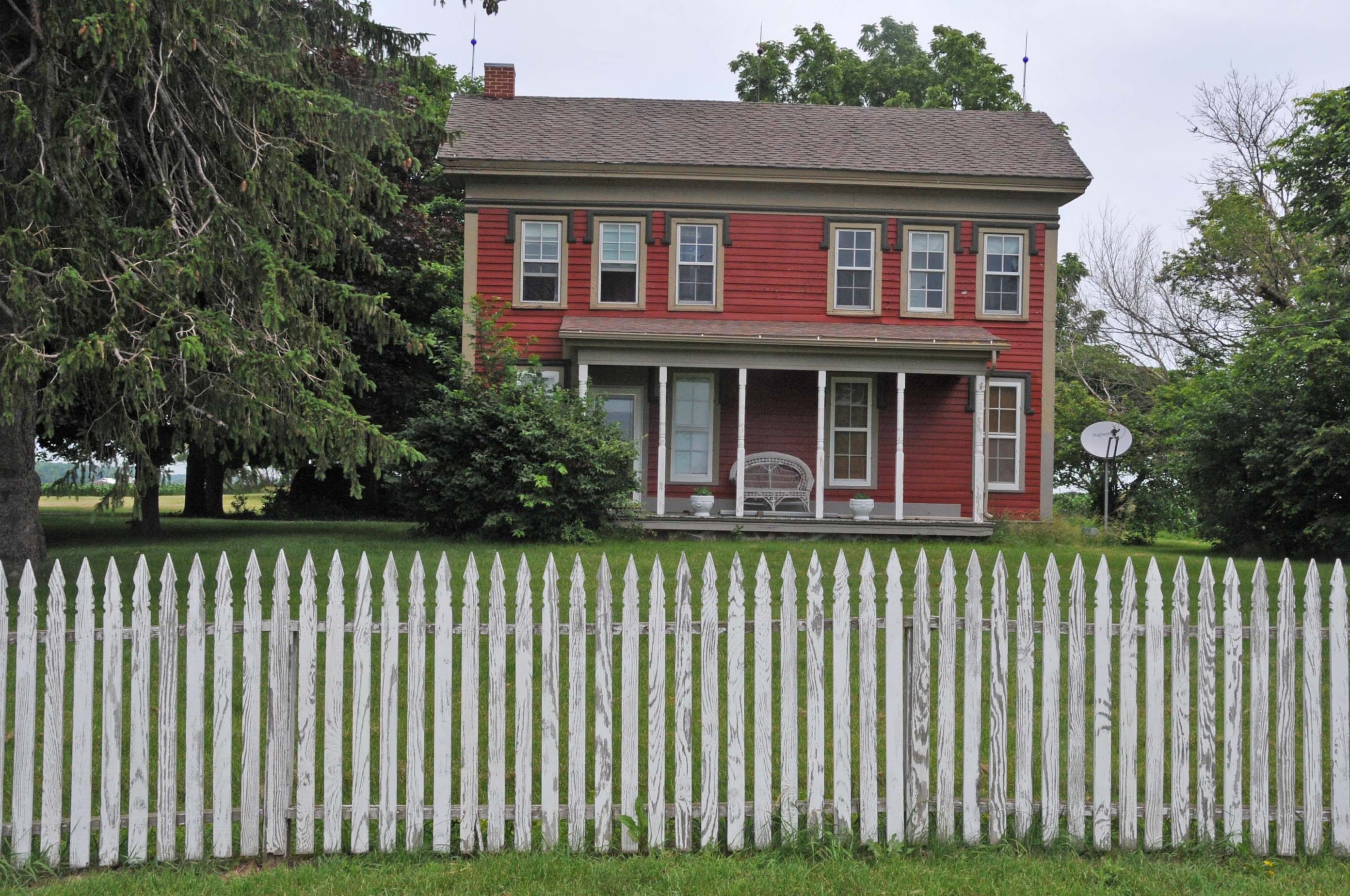
- Lewis and Sarah Boggs House, June 2013

- Location within Indiana Location within the United States
- Location: 9564 14th Rd., north of Argos, Indiana
- Coordinates: 41°16′29″N 86°14′33″W
- Area: 2.1 acres (0.85 ha)
- Built: c. 1855
- Built by: Boggs, Lewis
- Architectural style: Greek Revival
- NRHP reference No.: 12000337
- Added to NRHP: June 15, 2012

Lewis and Sarah Boggs House is a historic home located in Center Township, Marshall County, Indiana. It was built circa 1855, and is a two-story, Greek Revival style I-house with a rear ell. It has a side gable roof and sits on a split-face granite foundation. It features corner boards that form Doric order pilasters.

It was listed on the National Register of Historic Places in 2012.
