= Inwood, Indiana =

Unincorporated community in Indiana, U.S.

Coordinates: 41°19′03″N 86°12′11″W

Inwood is an unincorporated community in Marshall County, Indiana, in the United States.

== History ==
Inwood was originally called Pearsonville, and under the latter name was platted and laid out in 1854. When the railroad was built through the settlement two years later, it was given the shorter Inwood by the railroad company for its forested setting.
