= Hibbard, Indiana =

- Unincorporated community
- Location within Indiana Location within the United States
- Coordinates: 41°15′12″N 86°23′13″W
- Country: United States
- State: Indiana
- County: Marshall
- Township: Union
- Elevation: 771 ft (235 m)
- ZIP code: 46511
- FIPS code: 18-33304
- GNIS feature ID: 436083

Hibbard is an unincorporated community in Union Township, Marshall County, Indiana.

== History ==
Hibbard was originally called Dante, in honor of the Italian poet Dante Alighieri, and under that name was platted in 1883. A post office called Hibbard was established in 1887, and remained in operation until it was discontinued in 1958.

Hibbard was a station on the New York, Chicago and St. Louis Railroad.

== Geography ==
Hibbard is located at 41°15′12″N 86°23′13″W.
