= Polk Township District No. 2 School =

- U.S. National Register of Historic Places
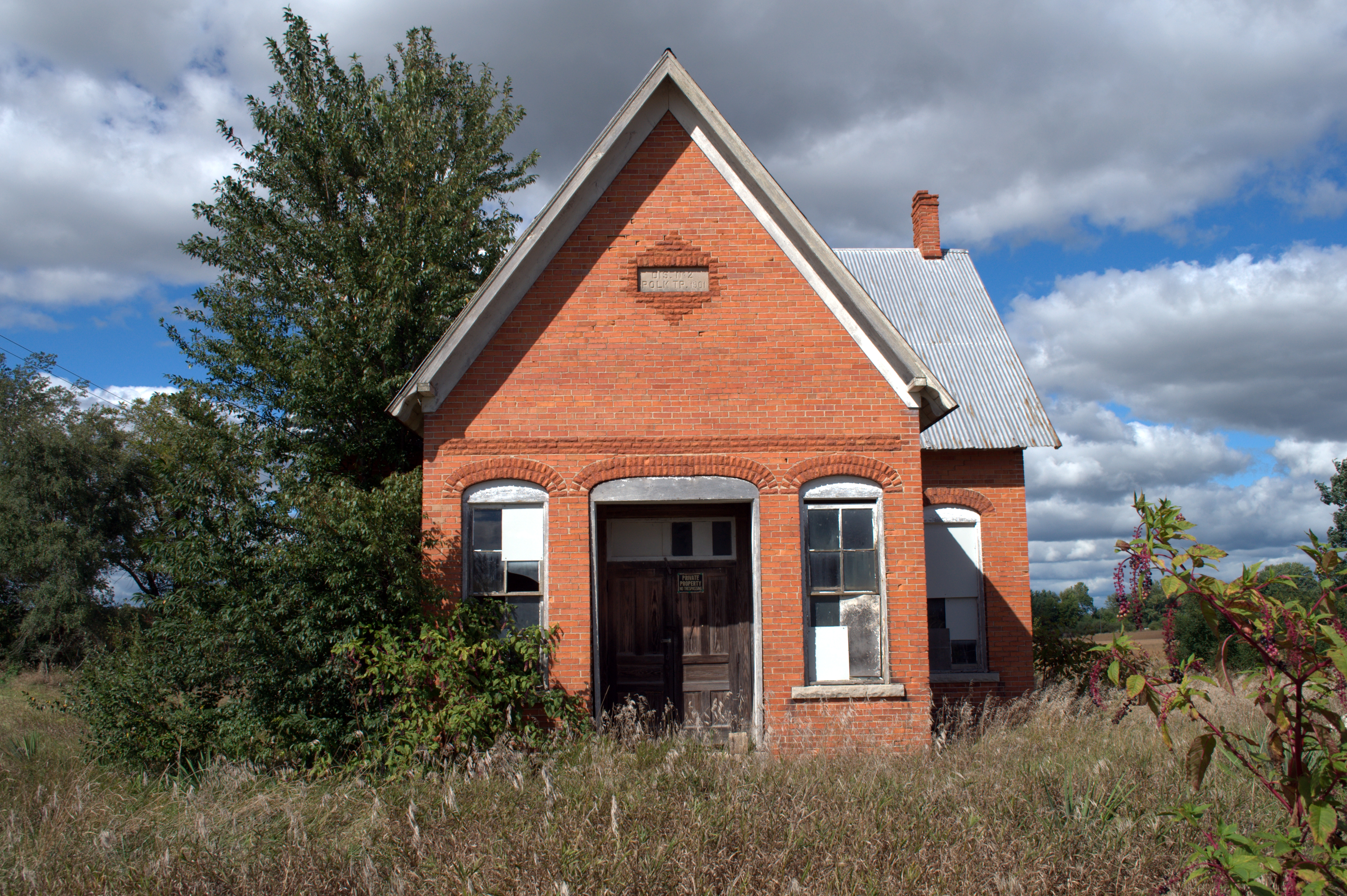
- Polk Township Polk Township District No. 2, September 2013

- Location within Indiana Location within the United States
- Location: 18998 W. 2A Rd., southeast of Walkerton, Indiana
- Coordinates: 41°26′40″N 86°25′30″W
- Area: 0.62 acres (0.25 ha)
- Built: 1901
- Built by: Bennett, Frank; Mead, H.P.; Burnside, Joe
- Architectural style: Queen Anne
- NRHP reference No.: 12001153
- Added to NRHP: January 9, 2013

Polk Township District No. 2 School, also known as the Barber School, is a historic one-room school located in Polk Township, Marshall County, Indiana. It was built about 1901, and is a one-story, "T"-plan brick building with Queen Anne style detailing. The building consists of front cloak room section with a single large classroom. Both sections have high pitched gable roofs. The building features patterned brick details and rafter tails with cut scroll designs. The school closed in 1925, with local school consolidation.

It was listed on the National Register of Historic Places in 2013.
