= Argos Izaak Walton League Historic District =

Historic district in Indiana, United States

- U.S. National Register of Historic Places
- U.S. Historic district
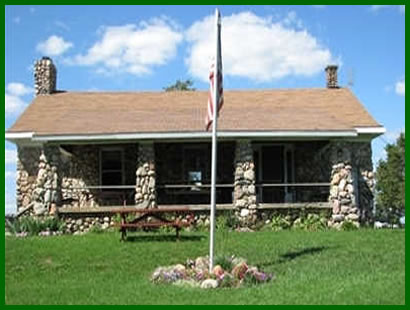
- Argos Izaak Walton League Historic District Clubhouse

- Location within Indiana
- Location: 7184 E. 16th Road east of Argos, Indiana
- Coordinates: 41°14′43″N 86°11′44″W
- Architectural style: Craftsman-style
- NRHP reference No.: 11000914
- Added to NRHP: December 15, 2011

The Argos Izaak Walton League Historic District is an Indiana chapter location of the Izaak Walton League of America. The Izaak Walton League of America is a conservation organization established in 1922 with a mission to conserve, maintain, protect and restore the soil, forest, water and air. The Argos Chapter of the Izaak Walton League of America, also referred to as the Argos Ikes, was formed just after the original establishment in 1926. The Argos Ikes’ founders were community leaders interested in environmentalism. The first few acres of property were purchased in 1929 with fishing ponds and structures erected to develop a fishing hatchery. Additional acres were purchased in 1934 increasing the property to a total of 17 acres. Signing an agreement with the United States Bureau of Fisheries, under the New Deal Act, the members were able to build a clubhouse and additional structures.

In December 2011, the Argos Chapter of the Izaak Walton League was inducted into the National Register of Historic Places listings in Marshall County, Indiana. The contributing structures date back to the New Deal construction and include the clubhouse, storage building, stone gateway, two artesian wells, three stone picnic tables with benches, and a sluice. The National Park Service, nps.gov, featured the Argos Ikes in the National Register of Historic Places Program Weekly Highlight.

== Gallery ==
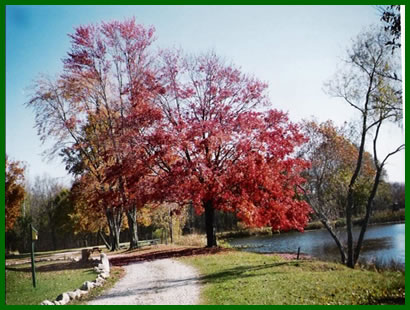
Site Grounds at the Argos Chapter of the Izaak Walton League

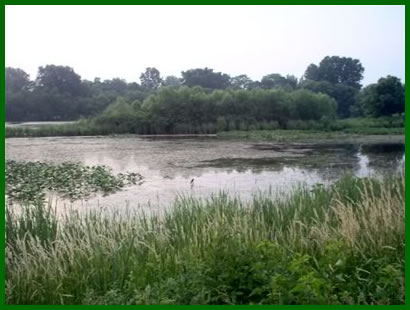
Wetlands at the Argos Izaak Walton League Historic District
