= Culver Academies =

Prep school in Culver, Indiana, US

Culver Military Academy / Culver Girls Academy

Location
- 1300 Academy Road No. 157; Culver, Marshall County, Indiana 46511; United States; 41°13′18″N 86°24′25″W

Information
- Type: Private, Boarding
- Established: 1894, 132 years ago 1971 (co-ed)
- Head of Schools: Douglas W. Bird
- Commandant of Cadets: Colonel Michael Squires (US Army Ret.)
- Teaching staff: 108 (on a FTE basis)
- Grades: 9–12
- Enrollment: 830 (2021)
- Student to teacher ratio: 7.7
- Campus: 1,850 acres (7.5 km^{2}); 44 buildings
- Athletics: 19 Interscholastic Sports
- Athletics conference: Independent
- Nickname: Eagles
- Endowment: $540M (2022)
- Website: www.culver.org

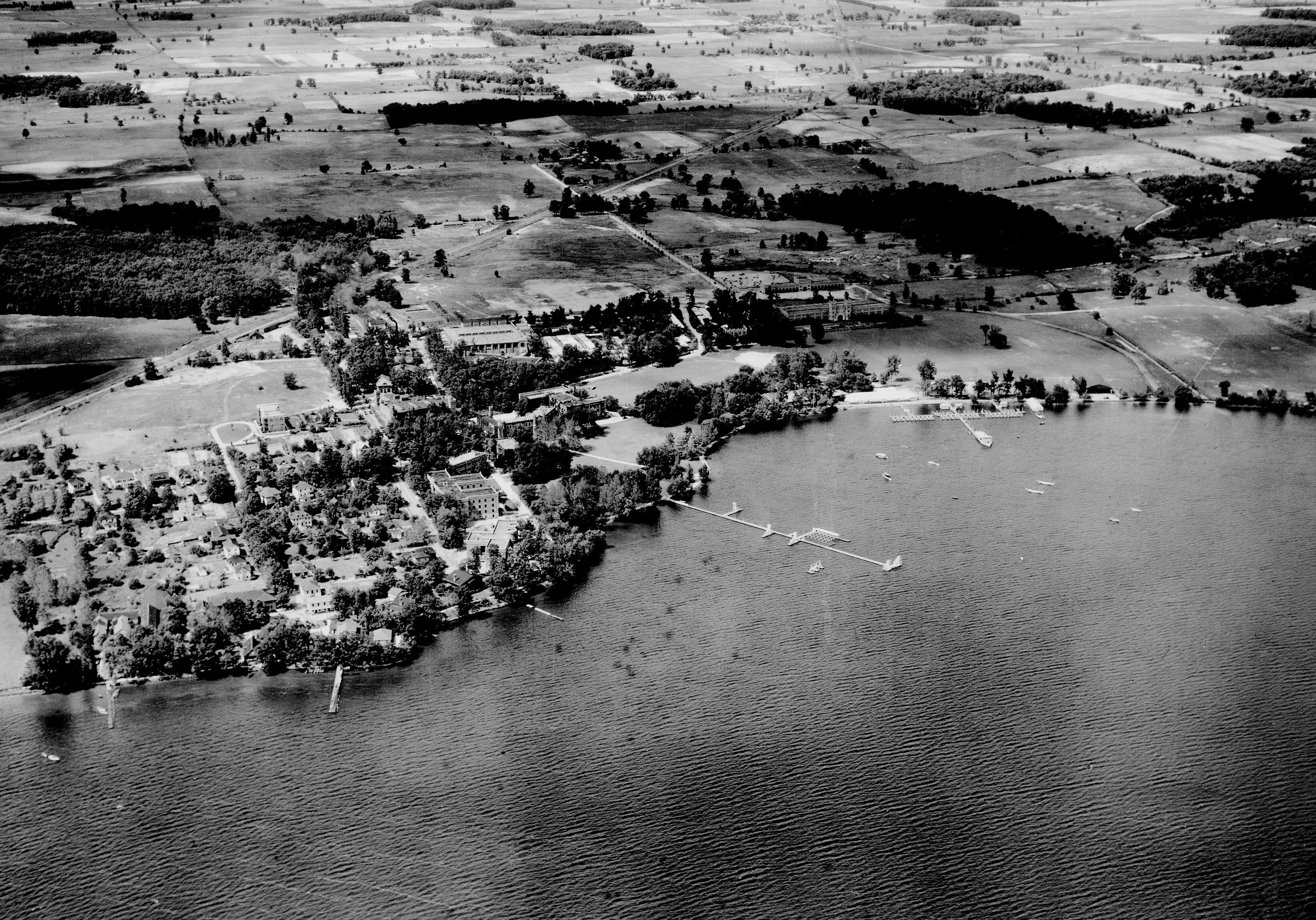
Aerial image, 1930s

Culver Academies is a college preparatory boarding school in Culver, Indiana, which is composed of three entities: Culver Military Academy (CMA) for boys, Culver Girls Academy (CGA), and the Culver Summer Schools and Camps (CSSC). Culver Military Academy was founded in 1894 by Henry Harrison Culver.

== Facilities ==
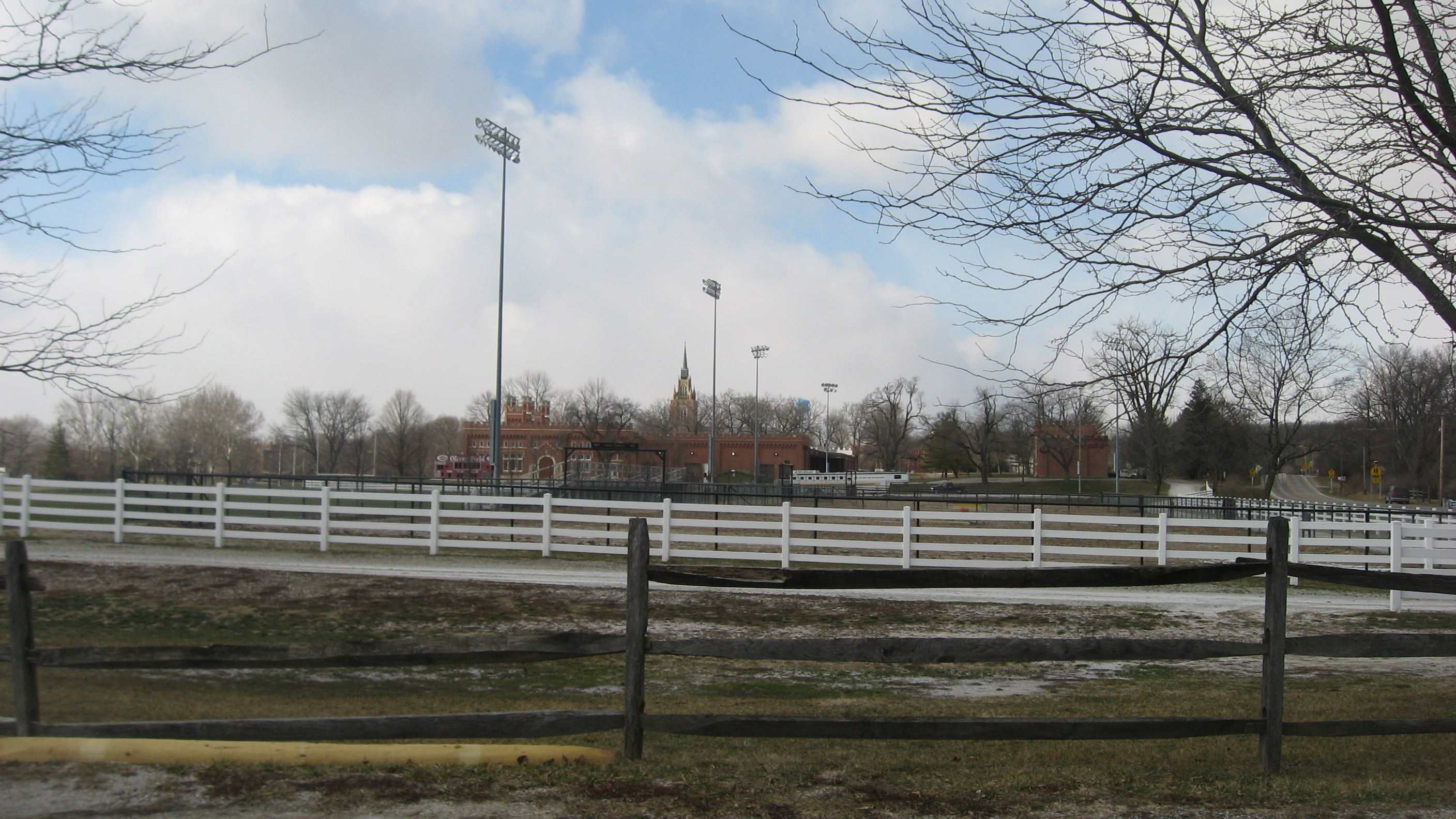
Fields at the Academies, with buildings in the background

The Eugene C. Eppley Foundation donated the funds for three classroom buildings that comprise the Gignilliat Memorial Quadrangle.

Eppley Auditorium, built in 1959, seats 1,492 people.

The Steinbrenner Performing Arts Center consists of a scene shop, dance studio, and private dance studio.

The 47,000-sq.-ft. Huffington Library opened on October 1, 1993. The building provides a southern terminus to the academic quadrangle; it has views of Lake Maxinkuckee. It houses a collection of about 55,000 volumes and the academies' information technology resources.

Henderson Arena is home to Culver Military Academy and Culver Girls Academy hockey teams.

On October 5, 2012, Culver dedicated the White-Devries Rowing Center for the men's and women's crew teams.

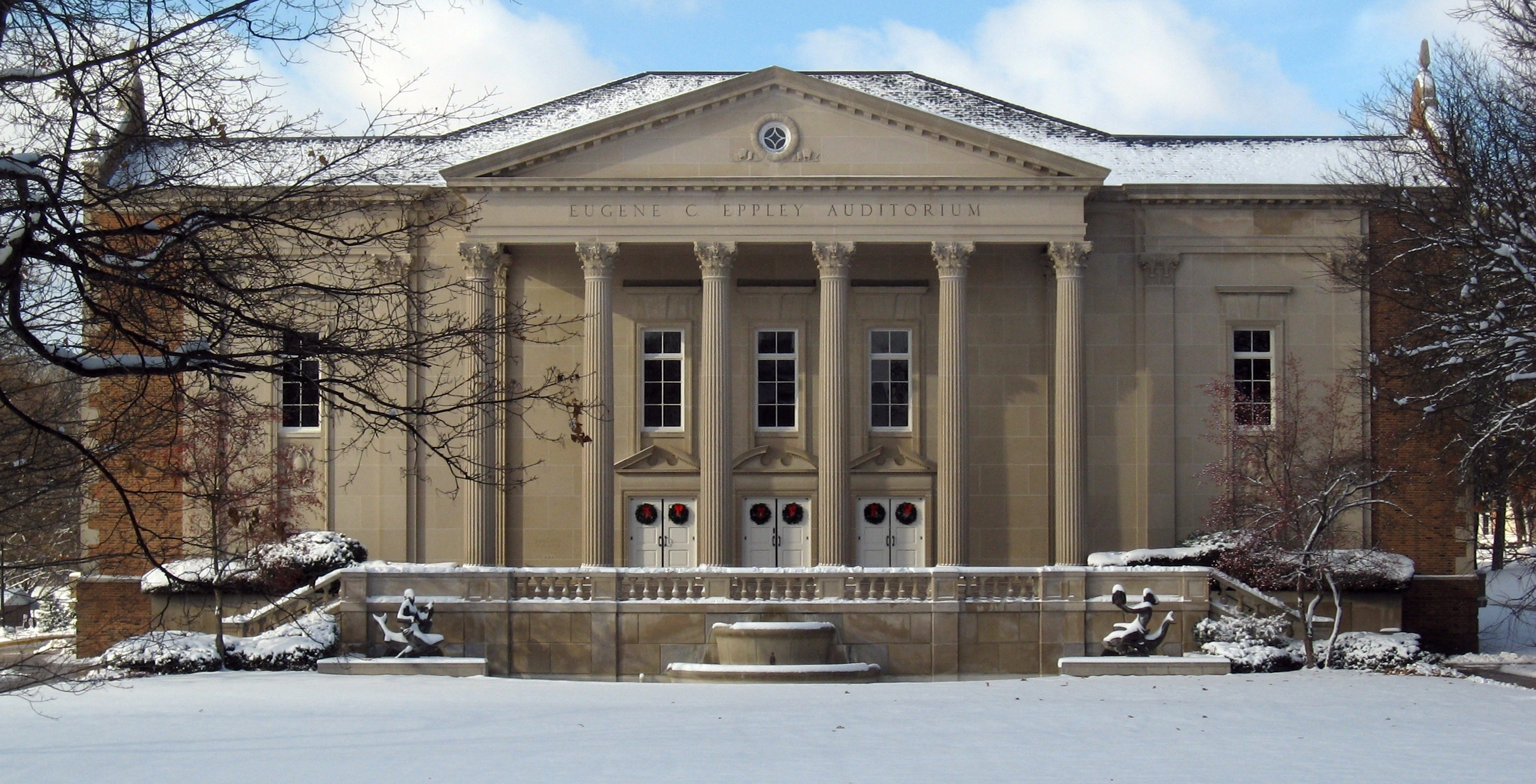
Eppley Auditorium in the winter.

In 2022, Culver Military Academy alumnus George Roberts '62 donated $65 million to replace the Main, North, and East barracks with Roberts Residential Quadrangle.

== See also ==
- Skyland Camp-Bowman Lake Ranger Station in Glacier National Park, built by the Culver Military Academy
- Delmar T. Spivey, Superintendent, 1956–1967
- John W. Carpenter, Superintendent, 1970–1974
- The Spirit of Culver a 1939 movie made about Culver starring Jackie Cooper and Freddie Bartholomew.
- Tom Brown of Culver, a 1932 movie made about Culver featuring a young Tyrone Power
- List of high schools in Indiana
