= Marshall County Infirmary =

- U.S. National Register of Historic Places
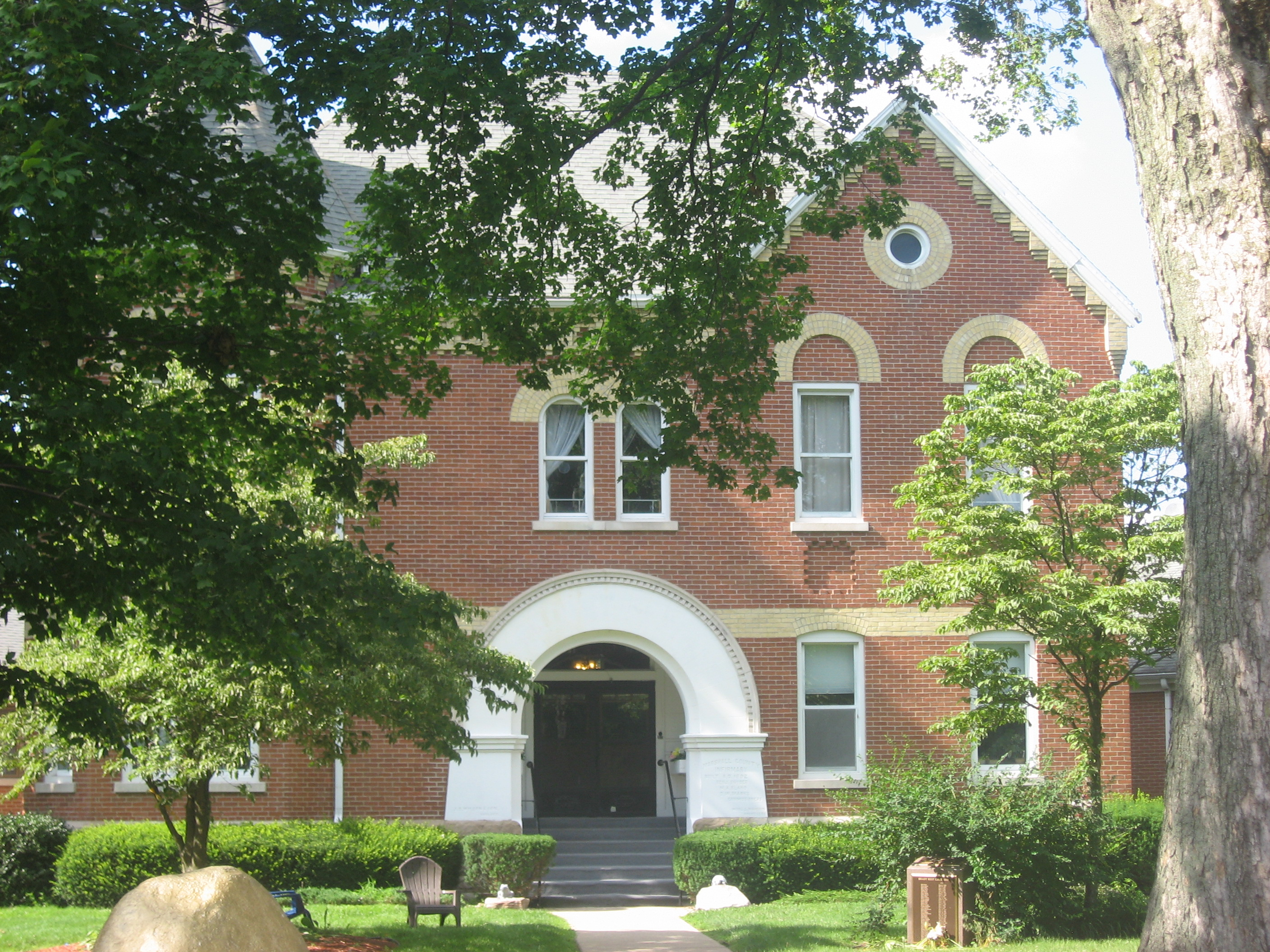
- Marshall County Infirmary, July 2013

- Location within Indiana Location within the United States
- Location: 10924 Lincoln Highway, southeast of Plymouth, Indiana
- Coordinates: 41°19′58″N 86°16′08″W
- Area: 7.8 acres (3.2 ha)
- Built: 1892-1920
- Built by: Wilson, J.D. & Son
- Architect: Wing & Mahurin
- Architectural style: Romanesque, Basement barn
- NRHP reference No.: 00001139
- Added to NRHP: October 9, 2000

Marshall County Infirmary, also known as the Shady Rest Home, is a historic poor farm complex located in Center Township, Marshall County, Indiana. The complex includes three buildings constructed between 1893 and 1920. The Superintendent's Quarters was built in 1895, and is a two-story, Romanesque Revival style brick structure over a full basement. It has a two-story, rear wing that may have been constructed as early as 1893. The house features a corner tower with conical roof and round arched windows. Also on the property are the contributing well house (c. 1920) and large four portal basement barn (1893).

It was listed on the National Register of Historic Places in 2000.
