= Culver, Indiana =

- Town
- Logo

- Location of Culver in Marshall County, Indiana.
- Coordinates: 41°13′2″N 86°25′18″W
- Country: United States
- State: Indiana
- County: Marshall
- Township: Union

Area
  - Total: 1.16 sq mi (3.0 km^{2})
  - Land: 1.16 sq mi (3.0 km^{2})
  - Water: 0.0 sq mi (0 km^{2})
- Elevation: 764 ft (233 m)

Population (2020)
  - Total: 1,129
  - Density: 973.3/sq mi (375.8/km^{2})
- Time zone: UTC-5 (EST)
  - Summer (DST): UTC-4 (EDT)
- ZIP code: 46511
- Area code: 574
- FIPS code: 18-16300
- GNIS feature ID: 0433239
- Website: www.in.gov/towns/culver/

Culver is a town in Marshall County, Indiana, United States. Culver is part of Union Township, which also includes the communities of Burr Oak, Hibbard, Maxinkuckee and Rutland. The population of Culver was 1,129 at the 2020 United States census.

== History ==
The Potawatomi tribe had a recorded settlement in the area during the 18th century. In 1783, the Potawatomi tribe was one of more than thirty tribes at the Grand Council of the Western Alliance who sought to establish the Ohio River as the boundary between Native land and the encroaching United States. These negotiations were ultimately unsuccessful, leading to the removal of the Potawatomi via the Trail of Death in 1838. The chief at the time, known as Nas-wau-kee, lived on a reservation near Lake Maxinkuckee.The time leading up to their removal was chronicled and illustrated by artist George Winter. A historical marker was erected in 2021 commemorating Nas-wau-kee's life and removal from Culver as well as the establishment of a multi-family pioneer camp in the same area.

Culver was laid out as Union Town in 1844. It was later renamed for Henry Harrison Culver, who in 1894 founded the Culver Military Academy—today a college preparatory boarding school known as the Culver Academies.

The Culver Commercial Historic District and Forest Place Historic District are listed on the National Register of Historic Places. One of the buildings covered in the National Register is the post office, which contains a mural completed by Jessie Hull Mayer as part of the Section of Painting and Sculpture′s projects, later called the Section of Fine Arts, of the Treasury Department. Arrival of the Mail in Culver, completed in 1938, portrays students from the military academy and other residents looking at their mail.

== Geography ==
Culver is located at 41°13′2″N 86°25′18″W (41.217340, -86.421726).

According to the 2020 census, Culver has a total area of 1.16 square miles (3.00 km^{2}), all land.

== Demographics ==
Historical population
Census	Pop.	Note	%±
1900	505		—
1910	810		60.4%
1920	1,080		33.3%
1930	1,502		39.1%
1940	1,605		6.9%
1950	1,563		−2.6%
1960	1,558		−0.3%
1970	1,783		14.4%
1980	1,601		−10.2%
1990	1,404		−12.3%
2000	1,539		9.6%
2010	1,353		−12.1%
2020	1,129		−16.6%
US Decennial Census

=== 2020 census ===
As of the 2020 census, Culver had a population of 1,129. The population density was 973.3 inhabitants per square mile (375.8/km^{2}). There were 950 housing units at an average density of 819.0 per square mile (316.2/km^{2}).

The median age was 54.4 years. 15.8% of residents were under the age of 18; 6.3% were between the ages of 18 and 24; 16.8% were from 25 to 44; 30.9% were from 45 to 64; and 30.2% were 65 years of age or older. For every 100 females, there were 81.5 males, and for every 100 females age 18 and over there were 78.8 males age 18 and over. The sex makeup of the town was 44.9% male and 55.1% female.

There were 549 households, of which 19.9% had children under the age of 18 living in them. Of all households, 40.6% were married-couple households, 17.5% were households with a male householder and no spouse or partner present, and 37.2% were households with a female householder and no spouse or partner present. About 39.5% of all households were made up of individuals, and 19.3% had someone living alone who was 65 years of age or older. The average household size was 2.10 people.

There were 950 housing units, of which 42.2% were vacant. The homeowner vacancy rate was 1.6% and the rental vacancy rate was 20.6%. 0.0% of residents lived in urban areas, while 100.0% lived in rural areas.

Racial composition as of the 2020 census
Race	Number	Percent
White	1,021	90.4%
Black or African American	9	0.8%
American Indian and Alaska Native	6	0.5%
Asian	11	1.0%
Native Hawaiian and Other Pacific Islander	0	0.0%
Some other race	23	2.0%
Two or more races	59	5.2%
Hispanic or Latino (of any race)	31	2.7%

=== 2010 census ===
As of the 2010 United States census, there were 1,353 people, 598 households, and 354 families in the town. The population density was 1,503.3 inhabitants per square mile (580.4/km^{2}). There were 897 housing units at an average density of 996.7 per square mile (384.8/km^{2}). The racial makeup of the town was 95.8% White, 1.2% African American, 0.4% Asian, 0.9% from other races, and 1.8% from two or more races. Hispanic or Latino of any race were 2.4% of the population.

There were 598 households, of which 25.3% had children under the age of 18 living with them, 44.1% were married couples living together, 10.4% had a female householder with no husband present, 4.7% had a male householder with no wife present, and 40.8% were non-families. 37.1% of all households were made up of individuals, and 17.9% had someone living alone who was 65 years of age or older. The average household size was 2.15 and the average family size was 2.77.

The median age in the town was 47.7 years. 19.2% of residents were under the age of 18; 7% were between the ages of 18 and 24; 18.6% were from 25 to 44; 29.6% were from 45 to 64; and 25.6% were 65 years of age or older. The sex makeup of the town was 45.4% male and 54.6% female.

=== 2000 census ===
As of the 2000 United States census, there were 1,539 people, 655 households, and 410 families in the town. The population density was 1,961.7 inhabitants per square mile (757.4/km^{2}). There were 932 housing units at an average density of 1,188.0 per square mile (458.7/km^{2}). The racial makeup of the town was 96.04% White, 0.91% African American, 0.65% Native American, 0.58% Asian, 0.06% Pacific Islander, 0.71% from other races, and 1.04% from two or more races. Hispanic or Latino of any race were 2.21% of the population.

There were 655 households, out of which 26.0% had children under the age of 18 living with them, 48.7% were married couples living together, 10.2% had a female householder with no husband present, and 37.4% were non-families. 35.0% of all households were made up of individuals, and 18.0% had someone living alone who was 65 years of age or older. The average household size was 2.25 and the average family size was 2.88.

The town population contained 22.5% under the age of 18, 5.8% from 18 to 24, 23.9% from 25 to 44, 24.6% from 45 to 64, and 23.1% who were 65 years of age or older. The median age was 43 years. For every 100 females, there were 88.8 males. For every 100 females age 18 and over, there were 80.2 males.

The median income for a household in the town was $33,047, and the median income for a family was $46,190. Males had a median income of $34,583 versus $24,453 for females. The per capita income for the town was $18,938. About 8.5% of families and 10.4% of the population were below the poverty line, including 11.5% of those under age 18 and 7.0% of those age 65 or over.

== Education ==
The town has a lending library, the Culver-Union Township Public Library.

== Notable residents ==
- Donald B. Easum – American diplomat (1923–2016)
