= Walnut Township, Marshall County, Indiana =

Walnut Township
- Township
- Location in Marshall County
- Coordinates: 41°13′31″N 86°12′25″W
- Country: United States
- State: Indiana
- County: Marshall

Government
  - Type: Indiana township

Area
  - Total: 37.75 sq mi (97.8 km^{2})
  - Land: 37.71 sq mi (97.7 km^{2})
  - Water: 0.04 sq mi (0.10 km^{2}) 0.11%
- Elevation: 817 ft (249 m)

Population (2020)
  - Total: 2,873
  - Density: 72.8/sq mi (28.1/km^{2})
- ZIP codes: 46501, 46504, 46563, 46570
- GNIS feature ID: 0453970

Walnut Township is one of ten townships in Marshall County, Indiana, United States. As of the 2020 census, its population was 2,873 (up from 2,747 at 2010) and it contained 1,140 housing units.

== History ==
Walnut Township was organized in 1859.

The Argos Izaak Walton League Historic District was listed on the National Register of Historic Places in 2011.

== Geography ==
According to the 2010 census, the township has a total area of 37.75 square miles (97.8 km^{2}), of which 37.71 square miles (97.7 km^{2}) (or 99.89%) is land and 0.04 square miles (0.10 km^{2}) (or 0.11%) is water.

=== Cities, towns, villages ===
- Argos (vast majority)

=== Unincorporated towns ===
- Walnut at 41.176154°N 86.211946°W

=== Cemeteries ===
The township contains these two cemeteries: Maple Grove and McGrew.

=== Major highways ===
- US 31
- SR 10

=== Airports and landing strips ===
- Scott Airfield

== Education ==
- Argos Community Schools

Walnut Township residents may obtain a free library card from the Argos Public Library in Argos.

== Political districts ==
- Indiana's 2nd congressional district
- State House District 17
- State Senate District 5
