= Forest Place Historic District =

Historic district in Indiana, United States

- U.S. National Register of Historic Places
- U.S. Historic district
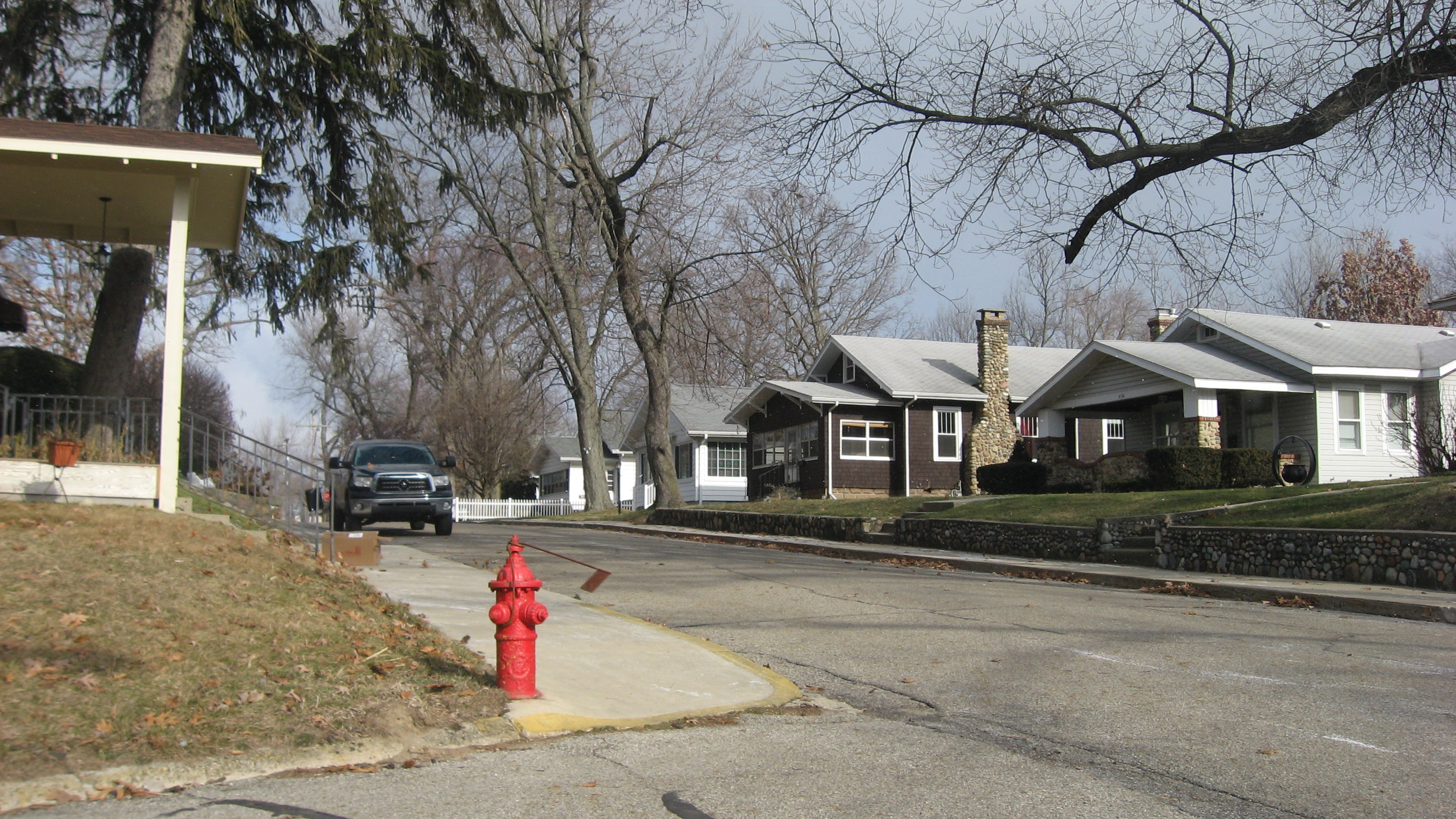
- Forest Place Historic District, January 2013

- Location within Indiana Location within the United States
- Location: Forest Place, bet. College Ave. and Lake Shore Dr., Culver, Indiana
- Coordinates: 41°13′14″N 86°25′1″W
- Area: 4.9 acres (2.0 ha)
- Architect: Stahl, Albert; Burns, David
- Architectural style: Bungalow/craftsman
- NRHP reference No.: 00000671
- Added to NRHP: June 15, 2000

Forest Place Historic District is a national historic district located at Culver, Indiana. The district encompasses 14 contributing buildings in a residential section of Culver. It developed between about 1917 and 1922, and includes examples of Bungalow / American Craftsman style architecture. The houses are small 1 1/2-story frame dwellings, with either front gabled, side gabled, or hipped roofs.

It was listed on the National Register of Historic Places in 2000.
