= Norris Farm–Maxinkuckee Orchard =

- U.S. National Register of Historic Places
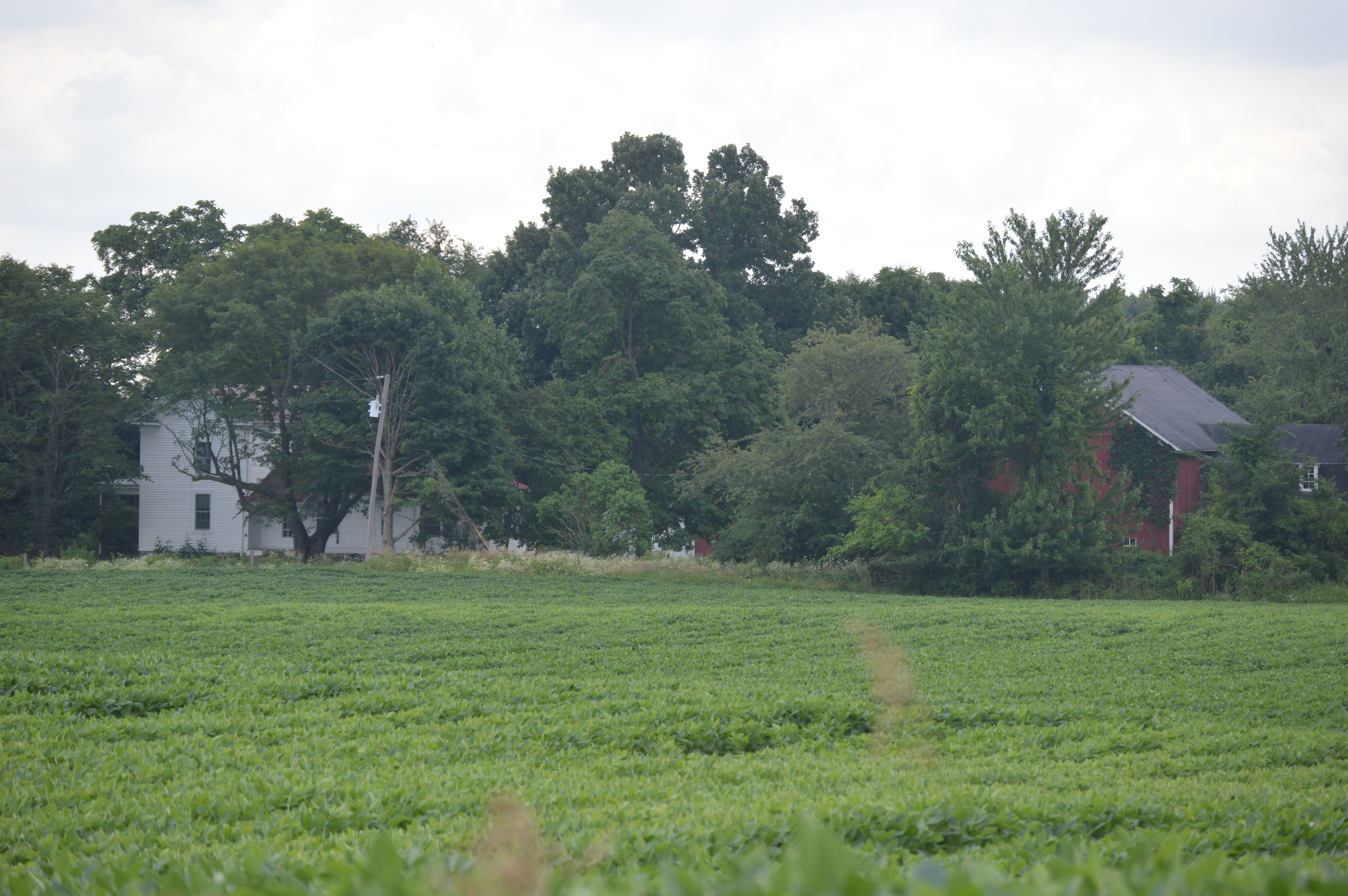
- Norris Farm–Maxinkuckee Orchard, July 2016

- Location within Indiana Location within the United States
- Location: 18799 Peach Rd., Union Township, Marshall County, Indiana
- Coordinates: 41°12′21″N 86°21′52″W
- Area: 7 acres (2.8 ha)
- Built: c. 1854
- Architectural style: Greek Revival, English barn, I-house
- NRHP reference No.: 16000337
- Added to NRHP: June 7, 2016

Norris Farm–Maxinkuckee Orchard is a historic home and farm located in Union Township, Marshall County, Indiana. The farmhouse was built in 1855, and is a two-story, vernacular Greek Revival style frame I-house with a one-story rear ell. It sits on a fieldstone foundation and is sheathed in clapboard. Also on the property are the contributing garage & milk house annex (c. 1915 & c. 1925), English barn (c. 1905/c.1925), bull shed (c. 1925), apple storage barn (1935, 1955), pasture and orchard fencing (c. 1925), and sundial (c. 1910).

It was listed on the National Register of Historic Places in 2016.
