= Maxinkuckee, Indiana =

- Unincorporated community
- Location within Indiana Location within the United States
- Coordinates: 41°12′30″N 86°22′53″W
- Country: United States
- State: Indiana
- County: Marshall
- Township: Union
- Elevation: 791 ft (241 m)
- ZIP code: 46511
- FIPS code: 18-47700
- GNIS feature ID: 438747

Maxinkuckee is an unincorporated community in Union Township, Marshall County, Indiana.

A post office was established at Maxinkuckee in 1857, and remained in operation until it was discontinued in 1902. The community took its name from Lake Maxinkuckee.

== Geography ==
Maxinkuckee is located at 41°12′30″N 86°22′53″W.
