= Henry Harrison Culver =

American businessman

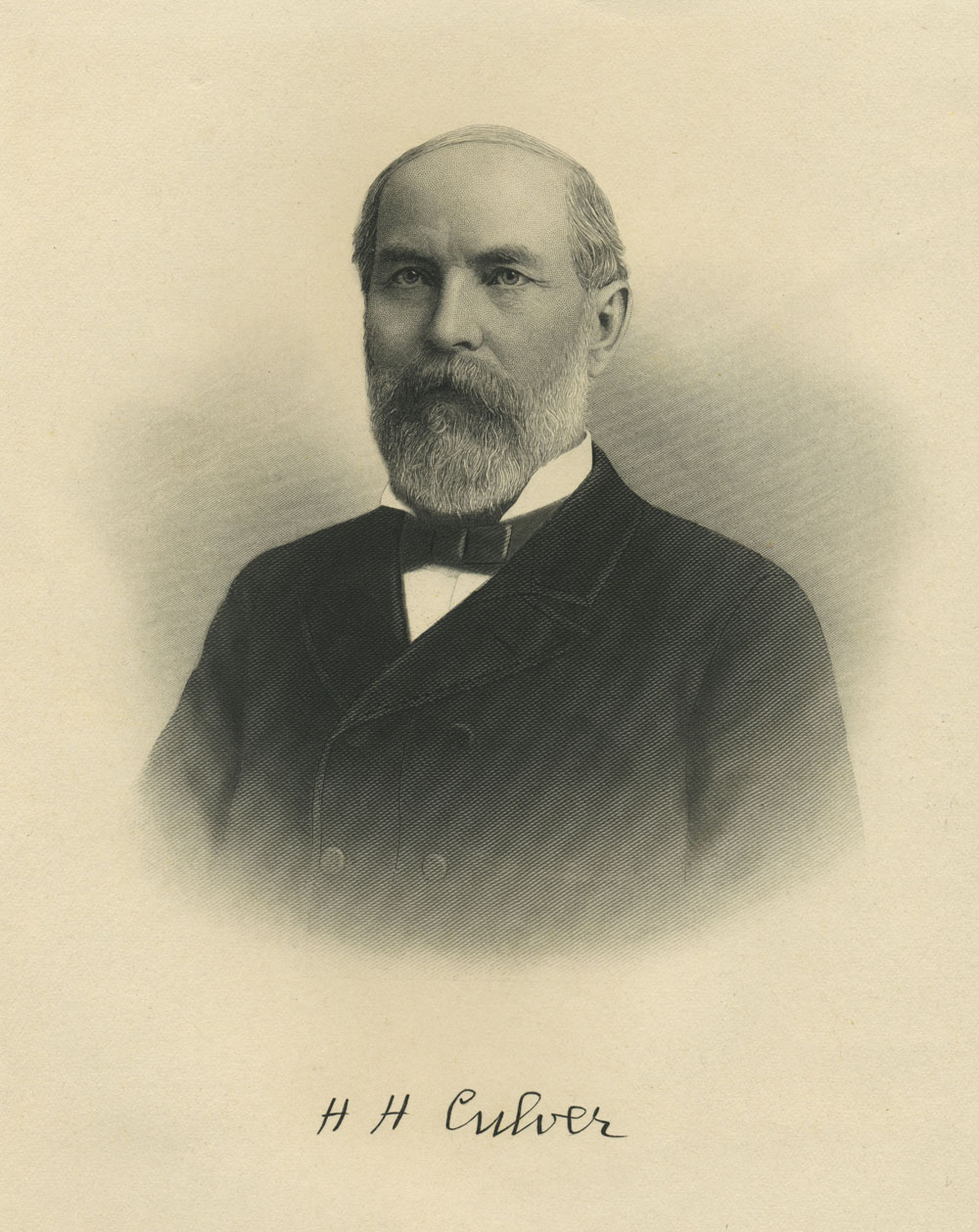
- Lithograph of Culver
- Born: August 9, 1840; London, Ohio, U.S.
- Died: September 27, 1897 (aged 57)
- Occupations: Businessman, philanthropist
- Known for: Founder of the Culver Academies
- Spouse: Emily Hand
- Parent(s): John Milton Culver; Lydia Howard Culver

Henry Harrison Culver (August 9, 1840 – September 27, 1897) was an American businessman and philanthropist. He is best known for founding the Culver Academies.

== Early life ==
Henry Harrison Culver was born near London, Ohio, on August 9, 1840.

== Career ==
Culver started a cooking range company with two of his brothers, Walter and Licius, which they incorporated in 1881 as the Wrought Iron Range Company in St. Louis. The company was very successful and Culver amassed a substantial fortune. After becoming ill, he retired in 1883 to the north shore of Lake Maxinkuckee, close to his wife's childhood home.

== Philanthropy ==
In 1894, Culver founded a college preparatory school on his property near Lake Maxinkuckee. It was modelled after West Point. It is now known as Culver Academies.

== Personal life and death ==
Culver married Emily Hand. They had five sons and one daughter. He died on September 27, 1897.
