= Polk Township, Marshall County, Indiana =

Polk Township
- Township
- Location in Marshall County
- Coordinates: 41°25′44″N 86°24′39″W
- Country: United States
- State: Indiana
- County: Marshall

Government
  - Type: Indiana township

Area
  - Total: 42.24 sq mi (109.4 km^{2})
  - Land: 42.09 sq mi (109.0 km^{2})
  - Water: 0.16 sq mi (0.41 km^{2}) 0.38%
- Elevation: 738 ft (225 m)

Population (2020)
  - Total: 2,781
  - Density: 67.1/sq mi (25.9/km^{2})
- ZIP codes: 46563, 46574
- GNIS feature ID: 0453755

Polk Township is one of ten townships in Marshall County, Indiana, United States. As of the 2020 census, its population was 2,781 (down from 2,824 at 2010) and it contained 1,170 housing units.

== History ==
Polk Township was organized on March 4, 1845. The date of the township's organization coincided with the inauguration of James K. Polk, hence the name.

The Polk Township District No. 2 School was listed on the National Register of Historic Places in 2013.

== Geography ==
According to the 2010 census, the township has a total area of 42.22 square miles (109.3 km^{2}), of which 42.02 square miles (108.8 km^{2}) (or 99.64%) is land and 0.16 square miles (0.41 km^{2}) (or 0.38%) is water.

=== Unincorporated towns ===
- Koontz Lake (east edge)
- Teegarden at 41.465046°N 86.377509°W
- Tyner at 41.409767°N 86.402509°W

=== Cemeteries ===
The township contains Barber Cemetery Blissville Cemetery and Tyner Cemetery.

=== Major highways ===
- US 6

=== Airports and landing strips ===
- Stuntz and Hochstetler Pines Airport

== School districts ==
- John Glenn School Corporation

== Political districts ==
- Indiana's 2nd congressional district
- State House District 17
- State Senate District 5
