= Walnut, Indiana =

- Unincorporated community
- Location within Indiana Location within the United States
- Coordinates: 41°10′34″N 86°12′43″W
- Country: United States
- State: Indiana
- County: Marshall
- Township: Walnut
- Elevation: 850 ft (260 m)
- ZIP code: 46501
- FIPS code: 18-79802
- GNIS feature ID: 445403

Walnut is an unincorporated community in Walnut Township, Marshall County, Indiana.

== History ==
Walnut was originally called Fredericksburg, and under the latter name was laid out and platted in 1866. When the railroad was built through the settlement in 1868, it was renamed Walnut, after Walnut Township. A post office was established as Walnut in 1869, and remained in operation until it was discontinued in 1906.

== Geography ==
Walnut is located at 41°10′34″N 86°12′43″W.
