= Jacoby Church =

Historic site in Marshall County, Indiana

- Jacoby Church and Cemetery
- U.S. National Register of Historic Places
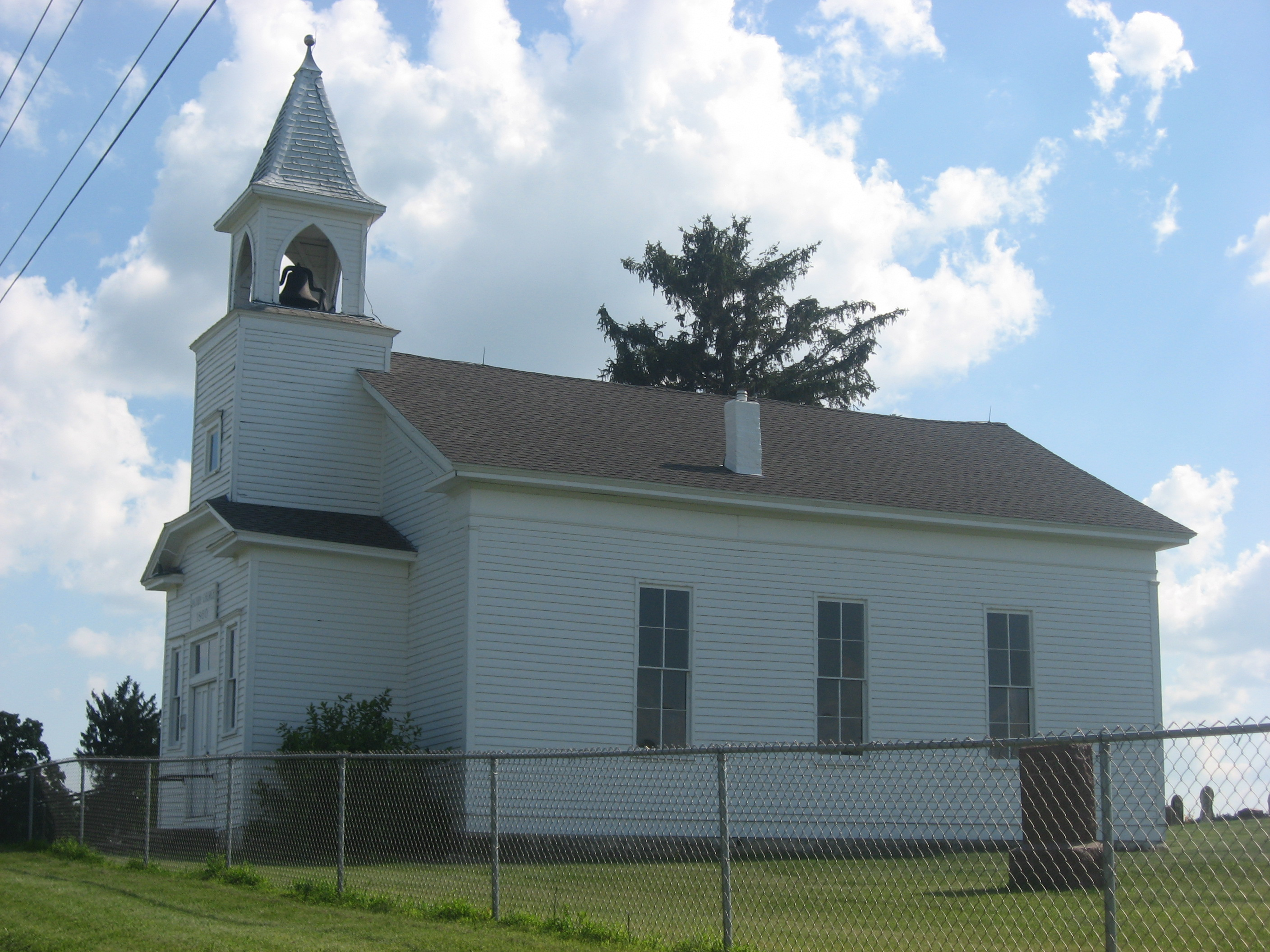
- Jacoby Church, July 2013

- Location within Indiana Location within the United States
- Location: Western side of N. King Rd., south of 8A Rd. and east of Plymouth, Indiana
- Coordinates: 41°18′34″N 86°15′43″W
- Area: less than one acre
- Built: 1860, 1910
- Built by: Fesser, John
- Architectural style: Greek Revival
- NRHP reference No.: 06001291
- Added to NRHP: January 25, 2007

Jacoby Church and Cemetery is a historic community church and cemetery located in Center Township, Marshall County, Indiana. The church was built in 1860, and is a one-story, Greek Revival style frame building, measuring 32 feet by 40 feet. The front facade features a projecting bell tower / vestibule added in 1910. The cemetery was established in 1850, and contains approximately 166 burials.

It was listed in the National Register of Historic Places in 2007.
