= Union Township, Marshall County, Indiana =

Union Township
- Township
- Location in Marshall County
- Coordinates: 41°13′24″N 86°24′25″W
- Country: United States
- State: Indiana
- County: Marshall

Government
  - Type: Indiana township

Area
  - Total: 43.95 sq mi (113.8 km^{2})
  - Land: 40.8 sq mi (106 km^{2})
  - Water: 3.16 sq mi (8.2 km^{2}) 7.19%
- Elevation: 771 ft (235 m)

Population (2020)
  - Total: 2,771
  - Density: 75.7/sq mi (29.2/km^{2})
- ZIP codes: 46511, 46563
- GNIS feature ID: 0453924
- Website: uniontwpin.org

Union Township is one of ten townships in Marshall County, Indiana, United States. As of the 2020 census, its population was 2,771 (down from 3,088 at 2010) and it contained 1,949 housing units.

== History ==
Union Township was organized in 1840. It was likely named after Union County, Indiana, the former home of some of the early settlers.

The East Shore Historic District and Norris Farm-Maxinkuckee Orchard are listed on the National Register of Historic Places. Woodbank was delisted in 2014.

== Geography ==
According to the 2010 census, the township has a total area of 43.95 square miles (113.8 km^{2}), of which 40.8 square miles (106 km^{2}) (or 92.83%) is land and 3.16 square miles (8.2 km^{2}) (or 7.19%) is water.

=== Cities, towns, villages ===
- Culver

=== Unincorporated towns ===
- Burr Oak at 41.256431°N 86.415285°W
- Hibbard at 41.253376°N 86.386951°W
- Maxinkuckee at 41.208376°N 86.381395°W
- Rutland at 41.244487°N 86.357228°W

(This list is based on USGS data and may include former settlements.)

=== Cemeteries ===
The township contains these five cemeteries: Burr Oak, Cromley, Masonic, Washington and Zion.

=== Airports and landing strips ===
- Culver Airport
- Fleet Field
- Jacks Field

=== Lakes ===
- Lake Maxinkuckee
- Houghton Lake
- Lost Lake
- Moore Lake

=== Major highways ===
- SR 10
- SR 17
- SR 117

== Education ==
- Culver Community Schools Corporation

The township is served by the Culver-Union Township Public Library.

== Political districts ==
- Indiana's 2nd congressional district
- State House District 17
- State Senate District 5
