= Culver Commercial Historic District =

Historic district in Indiana, United States

- U.S. National Register of Historic Places
- U.S. Historic district
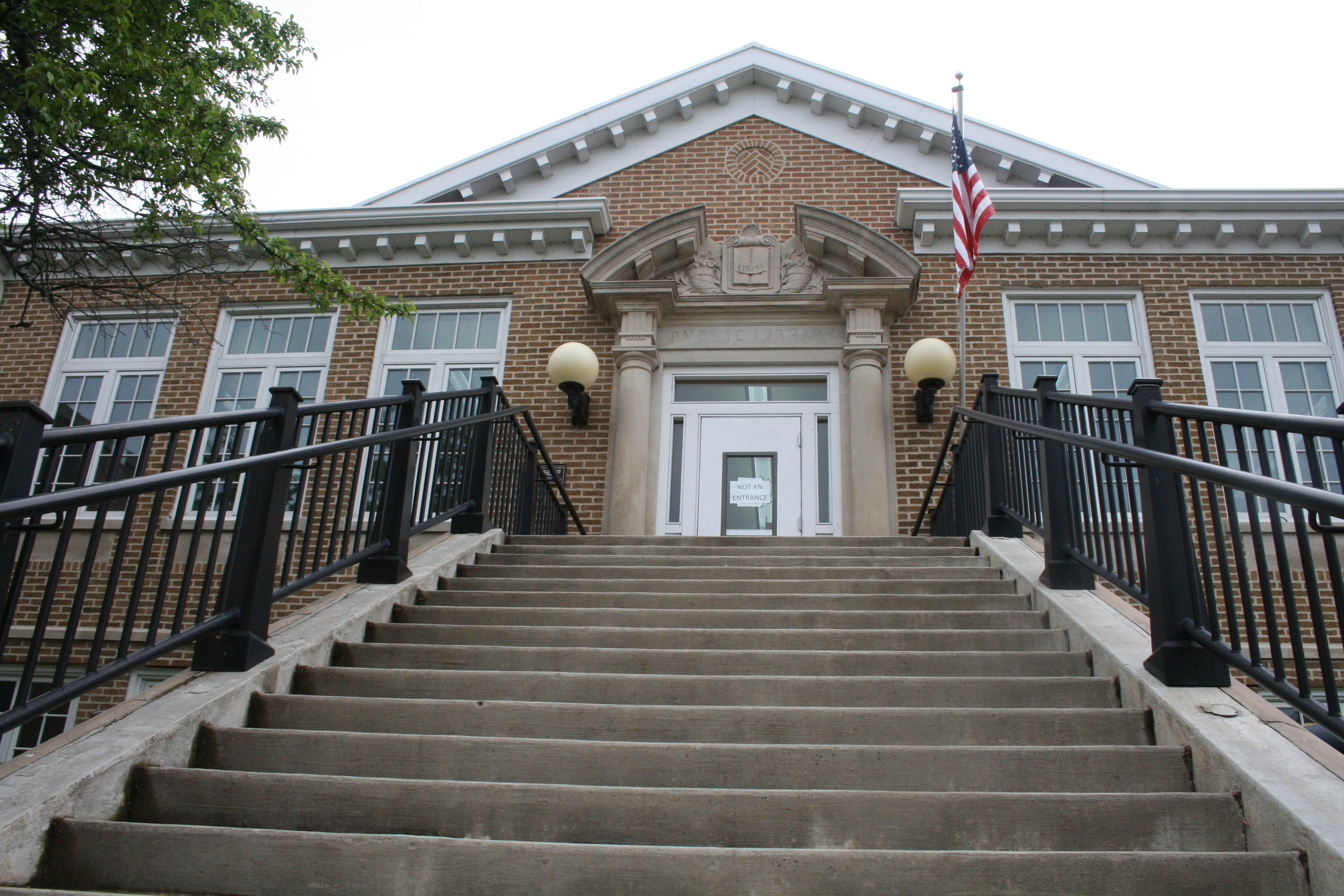
- Culver-Union Township Public Library, May 2011

- Location within Indiana Location within the United States
- Location: Roughly bounded by Washington St., the N-S alley E of Main St., Madison St. and Ohio St., Culver, Indiana
- Coordinates: 41°13′0″N 86°25′25″W
- Area: 2.6 acres (1.1 ha)
- Built: 1900
- Architect: Barnes, James I., Company; Ottshall, Milo
- Architectural style: Bungalow/craftsman, Colonial Revival, Italianate
- MPS: Historic Resources of the Culver-Lake Maxinkuckee Area MPS
- NRHP reference No.: 95001530
- Added to NRHP: January 11, 1996

Culver Commercial Historic District is a national historic district located at Culver, Indiana. The district encompasses 14 contributing buildings in the central business district of Culver. It developed between about 1900 and 1935, and includes examples of Italianate, Colonial Revival, and Bungalow / American Craftsman style architecture. Notable buildings include the Osborn Block (c. 1900), Menser Building (1903), Carnegie Library (1916), U.S. Post Office (1935), Service Station (c. 1935), Knights of Pythias Marmont Lodge 231 (c. 1915) and State Exchange Bank (c. 1914).

It was listed in the National Register of Historic Places in 1996.
