= Lake Maxinkuckee =

Lake in Marshall County, Indiana

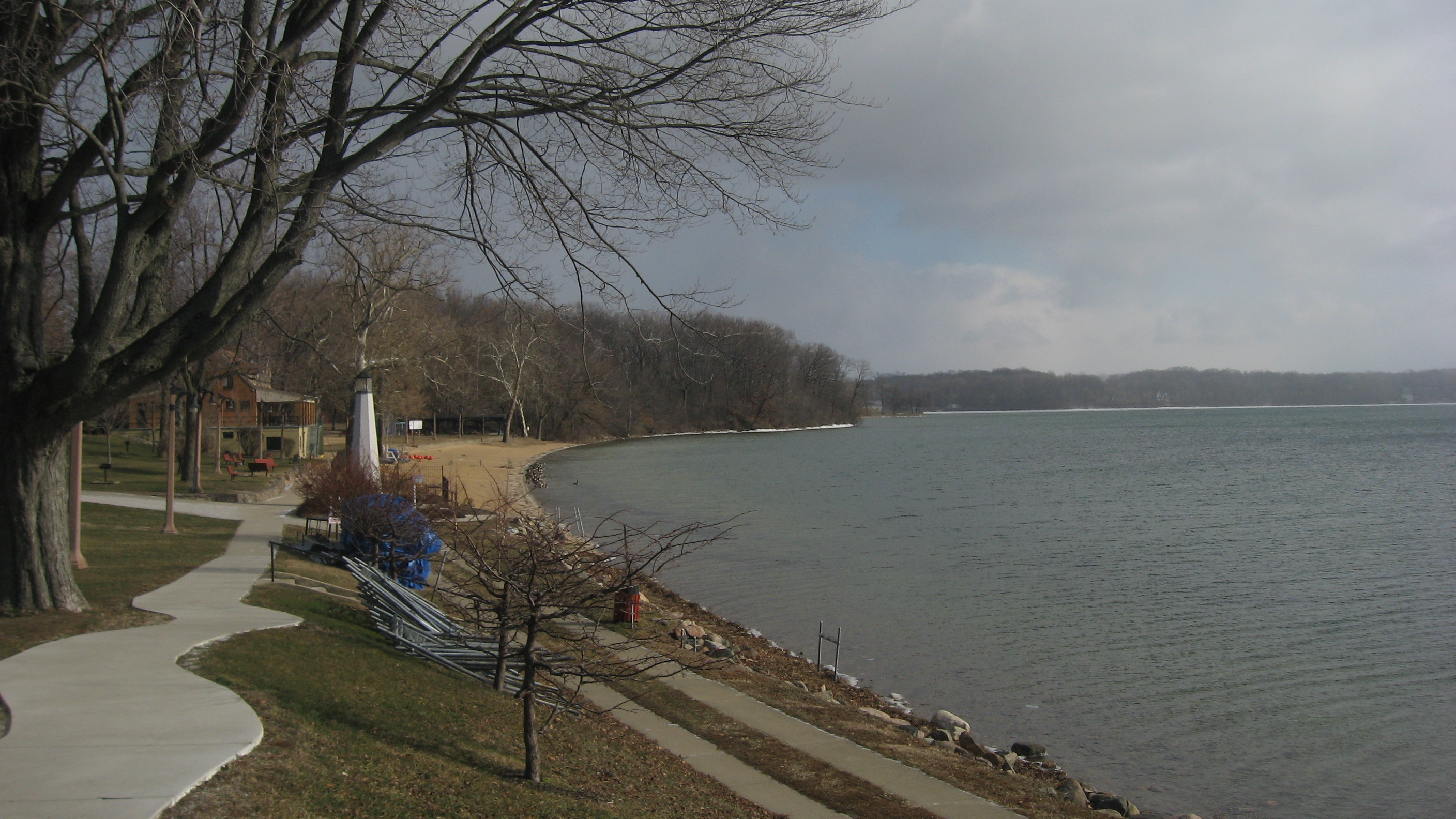
- Beach at Culver

- Location within Indiana Location within the United States
- Location: Marshall County, Indiana, near Culver
- Coordinates: 41°12′21″N 086°25′08″W
- Basin countries: United States
- Surface area: 1,864 acres (8 km^{2})
- Average depth: 24 ft (7.3 m)
- Max. depth: 88 ft (27 m)
- Surface elevation: 732 feet (223 m)

Lake Maxinkuckee is the second-largest natural lake in the U.S. state of Indiana, covering 1,864 acres (8 km^{2}). The town of Culver, Indiana, in southwestern Marshall County sits on its northwestern edge. The lake is used by nearby Culver Military Academies for sailing and rowing. Lake Maxinkuckee has a maximum depth of 88 feet (27 m) and an average depth of 24 feet (7 m). Local residents and visitors tube, wakesurf, water ski, and (ice) fish on the lake.

The first inhabitants of the lake area were Mound Builders, most likely the Potawatomi or Miami. Several mounds were built on the banks of the lake, the largest being "Pare Mound," thought to be used as a point of reference for the natives. The first white settlers arrived in 1836. Henry Harrison Culver, for whom the town is now named, founded Culver Military Academy in 1894.

The word Maxinkuckee is derived from the Potawatomi word Mog-sin-ke-ki, which means "big stone country".
