= Hoham-Klinghammer-Weckerle House and Brewery Site =

Historic house in Indiana, United States

- U.S. National Register of Historic Places
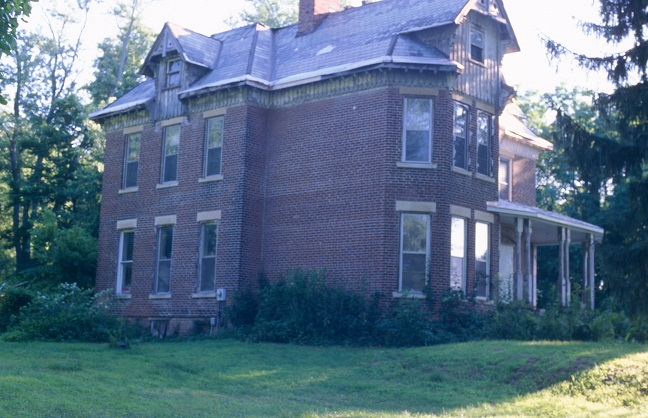
- Front of the house

- Location within Indiana Location within the United States
- Location: 1715 Lake Ave, Plymouth, Indiana
- Coordinates: 41°20′07.5″N 86°19′43.2″W
- Built: c. 1880
- Architectural style: Stick and Queen Anne
- NRHP reference No.: 12000338
- Added to NRHP: June 15, 2012

The Hoham-Klinghammer-Weckerle House and Brewery Site, located in Plymouth, Indiana is connected to three German families, all related through marriage, that settled in the area in 1844–1865. The Hoham, Klinghammer, and Weckerle families established and operated the Plymouth Brewery from 1857 to 1888. Among several buildings that existed at brewery site was a Stick/Queen Anne style house, now the only remaining building at the site.

The exact date and builder of the house is not known, construction started prior to 1882, probably by the Klinghammers. The largely brick house has two full floors and a half story top floor. A partially exposed full basement adds to the overall height of the house. Two brick vaults are buried fifty feet west of the house and were a part of the original brewery building.

== History ==
John Hoham was born in Strasburg, Germany on June 17, 1820. He came to the United States in 1840 and settled in Marshall County near Lake Maxinkuckee in 1844. In 1857 Hoham and Klinghammer purchased three acres for $75, located a mile southwest of Plymouth at that time. They constructed the first brewery in the county on this property.

John Hoham and John Klinghammer constructed the large brick vaults existing on the property. The vats located in one of the vaults are believed to have been used to ferment the beer. Hoham sold his interest in the brewery to Klinghammer in 1867. The abstract refers to the lands as "brewery property".

A linen map dating to about 1882 shows proposed routes for the Vandalia Railroad; one route passes by the south side of the brewery property. The property is marked "brewery" with six buildings drawn including a larger building along the east edge of the property with a footprint in a shape similar to the existing house. The construction of the house probably occurred prior to 1887 and assuming the building on the linen map is the house, the construction date would be about 1880.

It was reported that the "Old Plymouth Brewery" had been sitting idle for one year in 1889. The brewery was then used for egg storage during the 1890s. It was while Beldon was using it for storage that the main brewery building was destroyed by fire.

The house gained local fame in the Prohibition era when was used as for illegal gambling and liquor sales. Purchased for use as a road house in 1923, by 1928 what one local newspaper noted as the "County's greatest raid" had occurred there, and the business, known as the Pine Tree Inn, was padlocked for a year. It is unclear if it ever reopened as legitimate roadhouse.

== See also ==
- National Register of Historic Places listing in Indiana
- List of defunct breweries in the United States
- List of breweries in Indiana
