= Marshall County, Indiana =

County in Indiana, United States

- County
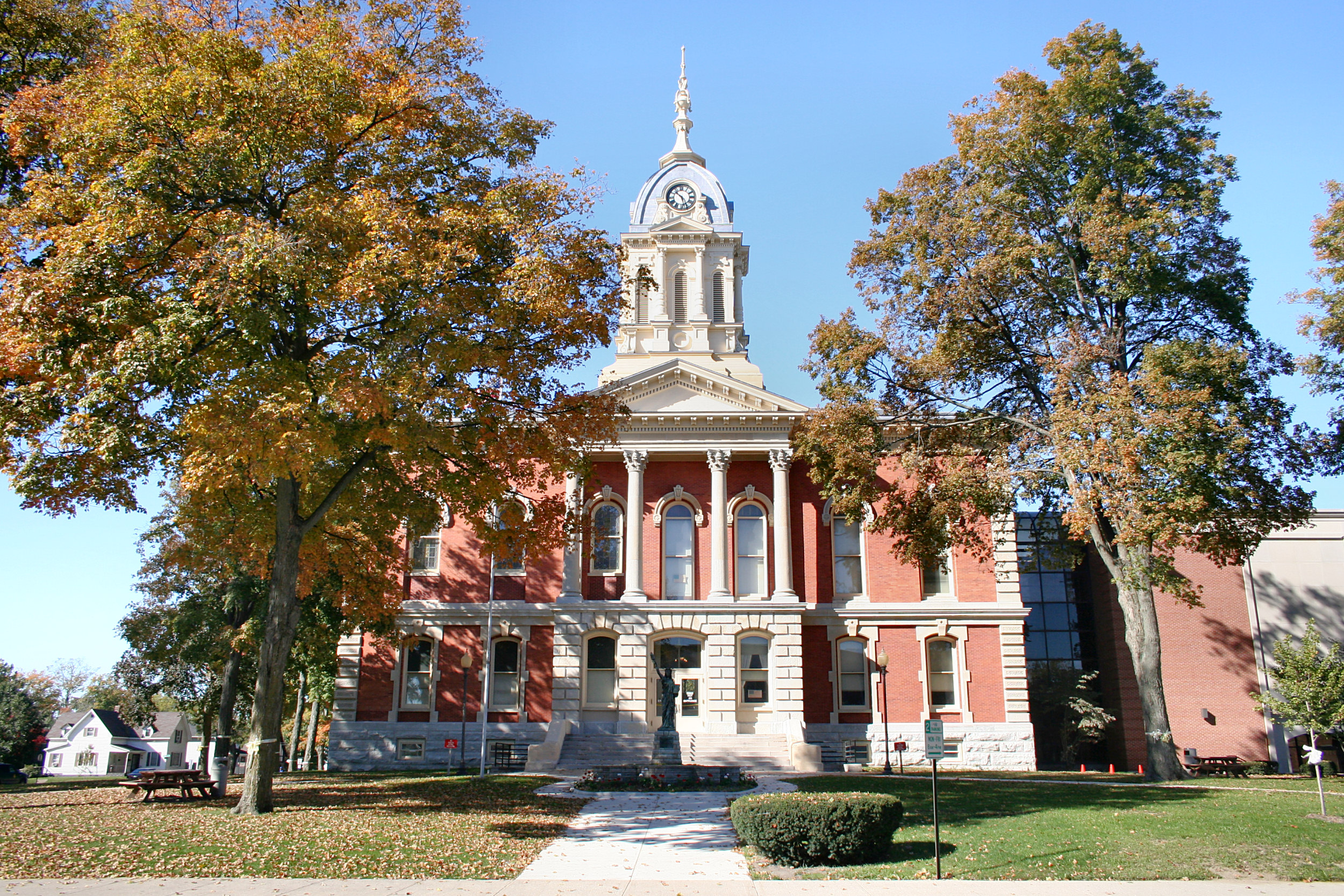
- Marshall County Courthouse in Plymouth, Indiana

- Flag Seal

- Location within the U.S. state of Indiana
- Coordinates: 41°20′N 86°16′W
- Country: United States
- State: Indiana
- Founded: February 7, 1835 (authorized); 1836 (organized)
- Named for: John Marshall
- Seat: Plymouth
- Largest city: Plymouth

Area
  - Total: 449.74 sq mi (1,164.8 km^{2})
  - Land: 443.63 sq mi (1,149.0 km^{2})
  - Water: 6.11 sq mi (15.8 km^{2}) 1.36%

Population (2020)
  - Total: 46,095
  - Estimate (2025): 46,599 ▲
  - Density: 105/sq mi (41/km^{2})
- Time zone: UTC−5 (Eastern)
  - Summer (DST): UTC−4 (EDT)
- Congressional district: 2nd
- Website: www.co.marshall.in.us
- Indiana county number 50

Marshall County is a county in the U.S. state of Indiana. The 2020 census recorded the population at 46,095. The county seat (and only city) is Plymouth.

== History ==
The Indiana State Legislature passed an omnibus county bill on February 7, 1835, that authorized the creation of thirteen counties in northeast Indiana, including Marshall. It was named for U.S. Chief Justice John Marshall, who died in 1835. The government of the county was organized in 1836, during the early years of settlement and before the forced removal of the Potawatomi people in 1838. The first settlers had arrived in the county in 1835; they arrived as a result of the end of the Black Hawk War as well as the completion of the Erie Canal. They consisted primarily of settlers from New England, "Yankees" descended from the English Puritans who settled New England in the colonial era. They were mainly members of the Congregational Church, although due to the Second Great Awakening many of them had converted to Methodism and some had become Baptists before migrating to the new area. As a result of this heritage, some place names in Marshall County are named after places in New England, such as Plymouth, which is named after Plymouth, Massachusetts, the site where the Mayflower landed in 1620.

== Geography ==
The low, rolling hills of Marshall County are completely devoted to agriculture where possible (significant drainages are wooded). The highest points on the terrain are three approximately equal swells (900 ft; 270 m ASL) along the south border line with Fulton County, 1.4 miles (2.3 km) NW of Richland Center.

Marshall County contains three significant bodies of water: Lake of the Woods (NE portion); Lake Maxinkuckee (SW portion); and part of Koontz Lake (NW portion). The Yellow River flows through northern, central, and western portions of Marshall County, past Plymouth; the Tippecanoe River flows southwesterly through the SE part of the county.

According to the 2010 census, Marshall County has a total area of 449.74 square miles (1,164.8 km^{2}), of which 443.63 square miles (1,149.0 km^{2}) (or 98.64%) is land and 6.11 square miles (15.8 km^{2}) (or 1.36%) is water.

=== Adjacent counties ===
- St. Joseph County - north
- Elkhart County - northeast
- Kosciusko County - east
- Fulton County - south
- Pulaski County - southwest
- Starke County - west/CST Border

=== Protected areas ===
- Menominee Wetland Conservation Area (W of Plymouth)
- Potawatomi Wildlife Park (on W bank of Tippecanoe River in SE county)

=== Major highways ===
- US 6
- US 30
- US 31
- SR 8
- SR 10
- SR 17
- SR 25
- SR 106
- SR 110
- SR 117
- SR 331

== Communities ==
=== City and towns ===
- Argos
- Bourbon
- Bremen
- Culver
- Lapaz
- Plymouth (city)

=== Census-designated place ===
- Koontz Lake (partial)

=== Unincorporated communities ===
- Burr Oak
- Donaldson
- Harris
- Hibbard
- Inwood (called "Pearson" 1854–1856)
- Maxinkuckee
- Old Tip Town
- Teegarden
- Tippecanoe
- Tyner
- Walnut

=== Townships ===
- Bourbon
- Center
- German
- Green
- North
- Polk
- Tippecanoe
- Union
- Walnut
- West

== Climate and weather ==
Plymouth, Indiana

Climate chart (precipitation, max. and min. temperature)
J	F	M	A	M	J	J	A	S	O	N	D
2.2 32 16	1.9 38 20	2.9 49 29	4 62 39	4.3 74 49	4.5 83 58	3.7 86 62	3.4 84 60	3.6 77 53	3.2 64 42	3.2 50 32	2.8 37 22
- █ Average max. and min. temperatures in °F
- █ Precipitation totals in inches
- Source: The Weather Channel
Metric conversion
J	F	M	A	M	J	J	A	S	O	N	D
55 0 −9	47 3 −7	72 9 −2	101 17 4	108 23 9	114 28 14	95 30 17	85 29 16	91 25 12	81 18 6	81 10 0	71 3 −6
- █ Average max. and min. temperatures in °C
- █ Precipitation totals in mm

In recent years, average temperatures in Plymouth have ranged from a low of 16 °F (−9 °C) in January to a high of 86 °F (30 °C) in July, although a record low of −25 °F (−32 °C) was recorded in January 1985 and a record high of 109 °F (43 °C) was recorded in July 1936. Average monthly precipitation ranged from 1.86 inches (47 mm) in February to 4.48 inches (114 mm) in June.

== Demographics ==
Historical population
Census	Pop.	Note	%±
1840	1,651		—
1850	5,348		223.9%
1860	12,722		137.9%
1870	20,211		58.9%
1880	23,414		15.8%
1890	23,818		1.7%
1900	25,119		5.5%
1910	24,175		−3.8%
1920	23,744		−1.8%
1930	25,077		5.6%
1940	25,935		3.4%
1950	29,468		13.6%
1960	32,443		10.1%
1970	34,986		7.8%
1980	39,155		11.9%
1990	42,182		7.7%
2000	45,128		7.0%
2010	47,051		4.3%
2020	46,095		−2.0%
2025 (est.)	46,599	▲	1.1%
US Decennial Census; 1790-1960 1900-90; 1990-2000 2010 2025

=== Racial and ethnic composition ===
Marshall County, Indiana – Racial and ethnic composition Note: the US Census treats Hispanic/Latino as an ethnic category. This table excludes Latinos from the racial categories and assigns them to a separate category. Hispanics/Latinos may be of any race.
Race / Ethnicity (NH = Non-Hispanic)	Pop 1980	Pop 1990	Pop 2000	Pop 2010	Pop 2020	% 1980	% 1990	% 2000	% 2010	% 2020
White alone (NH)	38,406	41,050	41,761	42,098	38,910	98.09%	97.32%	92.54%	89.47%	84.41%
Black or African American alone (NH)	57	74	114	196	204	0.15%	0.18%	0.25%	0.42%	0.44%
Native American or Alaska Native alone (NH)	20	71	121	80	63	0.05%	0.17%	0.27%	0.17%	0.14%
Asian alone (NH)	58	151	138	210	274	0.15%	0.36%	0.31%	0.45%	0.59%
Native Hawaiian or Pacific Islander alone (NH)	x	x	5	2	7	x	x	0.01%	0.00%	0.02%
Other race alone (NH)	14	6	19	16	112	0.04%	0.01%	0.04%	0.03%	0.24%
Mixed race or Multiracial (NH)	x	x	306	478	1,274	x	x	0.68%	1.02%	2.76%
Hispanic or Latino (any race)	600	830	2,664	3,971	5,251	1.53%	1.97%	5.90%	8.44%	11.39%
Total	39,155	42,182	45,128	47,051	46,095	100.00%	100.00%	100.00%	100.00%	100.00%

=== 2020 census ===
As of the 2020 census, the county had a population of 46,095. The median age was 40.2 years. 24.9% of residents were under the age of 18 and 18.7% of residents were 65 years of age or older. For every 100 females there were 99.3 males, and for every 100 females age 18 and over there were 96.6 males age 18 and over.

The racial makeup of the county was 87.4% White, 0.5% Black or African American, 0.4% American Indian and Alaska Native, 0.6% Asian, <0.1% Native Hawaiian and Pacific Islander, 5.0% from some other race, and 6.0% from two or more races. Hispanic or Latino residents of any race comprised 11.4% of the population.

26.6% of residents lived in urban areas, while 73.4% lived in rural areas.

There were 17,480 households in the county, of which 31.9% had children under the age of 18 living in them. Of all households, 52.9% were married-couple households, 17.3% were households with a male householder and no spouse or partner present, and 22.9% were households with a female householder and no spouse or partner present. About 26.1% of all households were made up of individuals and 12.4% had someone living alone who was 65 years of age or older.

There were 19,654 housing units, of which 11.1% were vacant. Among occupied housing units, 75.9% were owner-occupied and 24.1% were renter-occupied. The homeowner vacancy rate was 1.5% and the rental vacancy rate was 7.0%.

=== 2010 census ===
As of the 2010 United States census, there were 47,051 people, 17,406 households, and 12,516 families in the county. The population density was 106.1 inhabitants per square mile (41.0/km^{2}). There were 19,845 housing units at an average density of 44.7 per square mile (17.3/km^{2}). The racial makeup of the county was 93.5% white, 0.5% black or African American, 0.5% Asian, 0.2% American Indian, 3.8% from other races, and 1.5% from two or more races. Those of Hispanic or Latino origin made up 8.4% of the population. In terms of ancestry, 35.4% were German, 11.2% were Irish, 9.4% were American, and 8.5% were English.

Of the 17,406 households, 35.2% had children under the age of 18 living with them, 57.2% were married couples living together, 9.9% had a female householder with no husband present, 28.1% were non-families, and 24.1% of all households were made up of individuals. The average household size was 2.66 and the average family size was 3.15. The median age was 38.4 years.

The median income for a household in the county was $47,697 and the median income for a family was $58,017. Males had a median income of $43,732 versus $30,033 for females. The per capita income for the county was $22,493. About 8.7% of families and 12.2% of the population were below the poverty line, including 17.1% of those under age 18 and 10.4% of those age 65 or over.

== Government ==
The county government is a constitutional body, and is granted specific powers by the Constitution of Indiana, and by the Indiana Code.

County council: The legislative branch of the county government; controls spending and revenue collection in the county. Representatives are elected to four-year terms from county districts. They set salaries, the annual budget, and special spending. The council has limited authority to impose local taxes, in the form of an income and property tax that is subject to state level approval, excise taxes, and service taxes.

Board of commissioners: The executive body of the county; commissioners are elected county-wide, to staggered four-year terms. One commissioner serves as president. The commissioners execute acts legislated by the council, collect revenue, and manage the functions of the county government.

Current commissioners: Stan Klotz, Jesse Bohannon, Adam Faulstich (as of 2025)

Court: The county maintains a small claims court that handles civil cases. The judge on the court is elected to a term of four years and must be a member of the Indiana Bar Association. The judge is assisted by a constable who is also elected to a four-year term. In some cases, court decisions can be appealed to the state level circuit court.

County Officials: The county has other elected offices, including sheriff, coroner, auditor, treasurer, recorder, surveyor, and circuit court clerk. Officials are elected to four-year terms. Members elected to county government positions are required to declare party affiliations and to be residents of the county.

Marshall County is part of Indiana's 2nd congressional district and is currently represented by Rudy Yakym in the United States Congress. It is also part of Indiana Senate districts 5 and 9 and Indiana House of Representatives districts 17 and 23.

United States presidential election results for Marshall County, Indiana
Year	Republican		Democratic		Third party(ies)	
Year	No.	%	No.	%	No.	%
1888	2,582	43.70%	3,188	53.96%	138	2.34%
1892	2,558	43.41%	3,113	52.83%	222	3.77%
1896	2,938	44.45%	3,588	54.29%	83	1.26%
1900	2,947	45.12%	3,449	52.81%	135	2.07%
1904	3,001	48.39%	2,878	46.40%	323	5.21%
1908	2,947	45.31%	3,287	50.54%	270	4.15%
1912	1,196	20.21%	2,859	48.31%	1,863	31.48%
1916	2,855	44.64%	3,221	50.36%	320	5.00%
1920	5,708	53.64%	4,631	43.52%	303	2.85%
1924	5,354	53.22%	4,277	42.51%	429	4.26%
1928	6,738	60.24%	4,377	39.13%	70	0.63%
1932	4,943	39.84%	7,212	58.13%	252	2.03%
1936	6,118	47.17%	6,651	51.28%	202	1.56%
1940	7,718	56.41%	5,852	42.77%	111	0.81%
1944	8,225	59.88%	5,254	38.25%	257	1.87%
1948	7,873	56.97%	5,661	40.97%	285	2.06%
1952	9,990	63.12%	5,538	34.99%	300	1.90%
1956	10,504	65.72%	5,398	33.78%	80	0.50%
1960	10,460	62.47%	6,210	37.09%	74	0.44%
1964	7,895	48.10%	8,397	51.15%	123	0.75%
1968	9,290	56.67%	5,385	32.85%	1,719	10.49%
1972	11,908	73.02%	4,349	26.67%	51	0.31%
1976	9,707	59.16%	6,424	39.15%	277	1.69%
1980	10,209	62.21%	5,113	31.16%	1,089	6.64%
1984	11,100	68.76%	4,931	30.54%	113	0.70%
1988	10,490	65.41%	5,488	34.22%	60	0.37%
1992	8,048	48.58%	4,912	29.65%	3,607	21.77%
1996	8,158	52.84%	5,486	35.53%	1,796	11.63%
2000	10,266	63.57%	5,541	34.31%	343	2.12%
2004	12,074	67.78%	5,593	31.40%	147	0.83%
2008	10,406	56.03%	7,889	42.48%	276	1.49%
2012	11,260	63.25%	6,137	34.48%	404	2.27%
2016	12,288	67.36%	4,798	26.30%	1,155	6.33%
2020	13,844	69.38%	5,712	28.63%	397	1.99%
2024	13,837	70.54%	5,356	27.30%	423	2.16%

== See also ==
- National Register of Historic Places listings in Marshall County, Indiana
