= Plymouth Downtown Historic District =

Historic district in Indiana, United States

- U.S. National Register of Historic Places
- U.S. Historic district
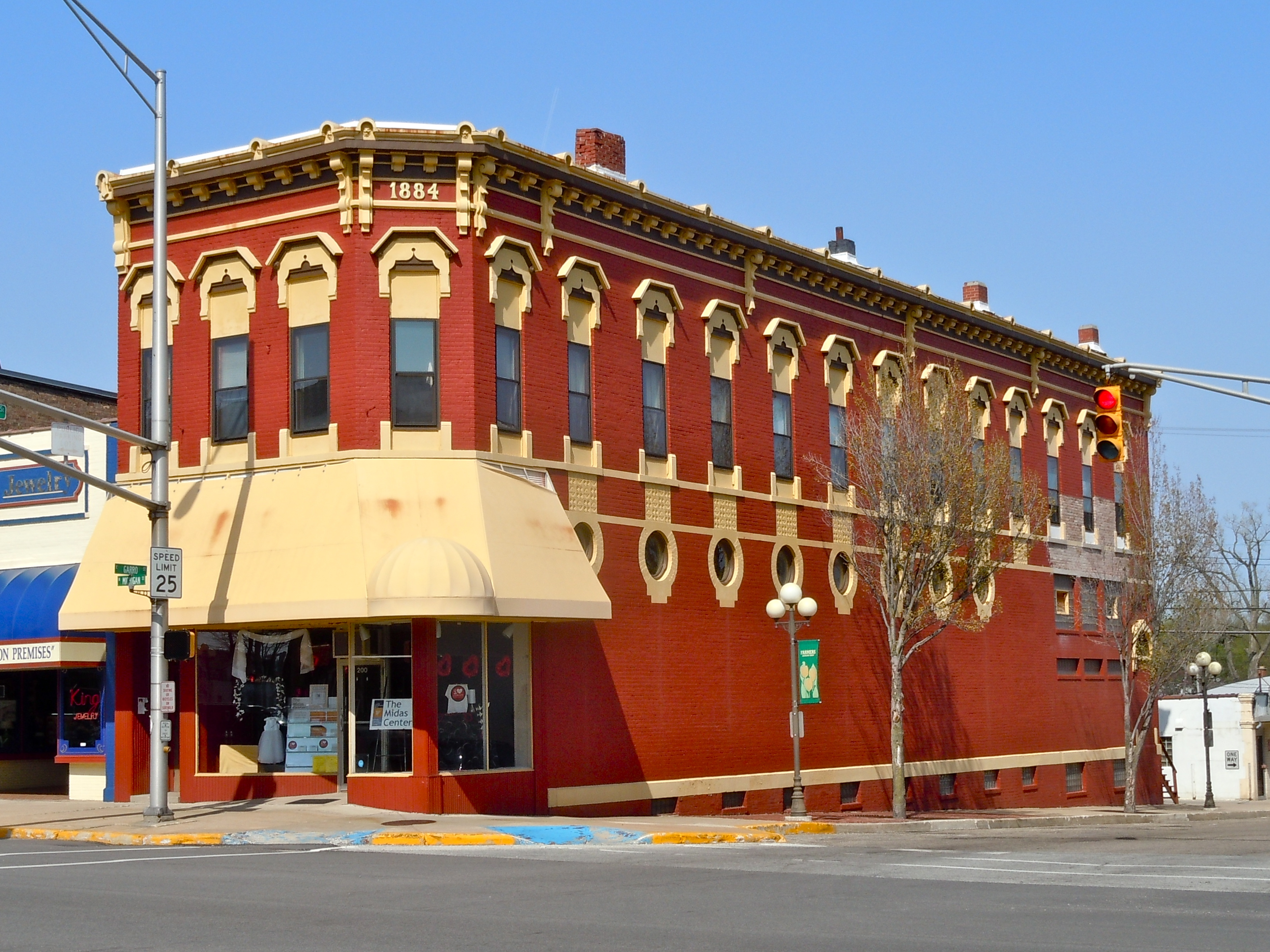
- Plymouth Downtown Historic District, April 2011

- Location within Indiana Location within the United States
- Location: Roughly bounded by Center, Washington, and Water Sts., and Yellow R., Plymouth, Indiana
- Coordinates: 41°20′27″N 86°18′34″W
- Area: 15 acres (6.1 ha)
- Built by: Jacob Ness
- Architect: Alves O'Keefe
- Architectural style: Colonial Revival, Italianate, Romanesque
- NRHP reference No.: 98001524
- Added to NRHP: December 17, 1998

Plymouth Downtown Historic District is a national historic district located in Plymouth, Indiana, United States. The district encompasses 47 contributing buildings and one contributing structure in the central business district of Plymouth. It developed between about 1870 and 1940, and includes examples of Italianate, Romanesque Revival, and Colonial Revival style architecture. Located in the district is the separately listed Plymouth Fire Station. Other notable buildings include the Montgomery Ward Building (1929), Metsker Block (c. 1910), Rentschler Building (1910), Early Plymouth Post Office (1884), First National Bank-Plymouth City Hall (1879, 1916), Packard Bank Block (1879), Simons Building (1895), Wheeler Block (c. 1865), Bank Block (c. 1880), Bank Block-Masonic Temple (1901), Plymouth Post Office (1935), and Plymouth Motor Sales (1929).

It was listed on the National Register of Historic Places in 1998. The Historic District comprises approximately four blocks of the original plat of Plymouth, laid out in 1834. The town is situated on the high north and west banks of the Yellow River, and along the north–south alignment of the Michigan Road. The district consists of generally continuous facade lines of masonry constructed commercial structures built from about 1870 to 1960. With few exceptions, the buildings retain a high level of integrity to their original appearance.

== History ==
When Center Township was organized in February 1836, Plymouth was chosen as the county seat. It consisted of a few log houses. Growth was slow until the railroads arrived in the 1850s. Center Township's economy was based on agriculture which expanded with the railroads, and Plymouth developed as a commercial center. The Downtown Historic District reflects that development and growth.

The Michigan Road was built from the Ohio River at Madison, through Indianapolis through Plymouth and South Bend to Lake Michigan in the 1800s. It had a right-of-way of 100 feet (30 m). In Plymouth, main commercial blocks formed along the line of the right-of-way. Michigan Street was and remains the principal commercial corridor.

== Location and description ==
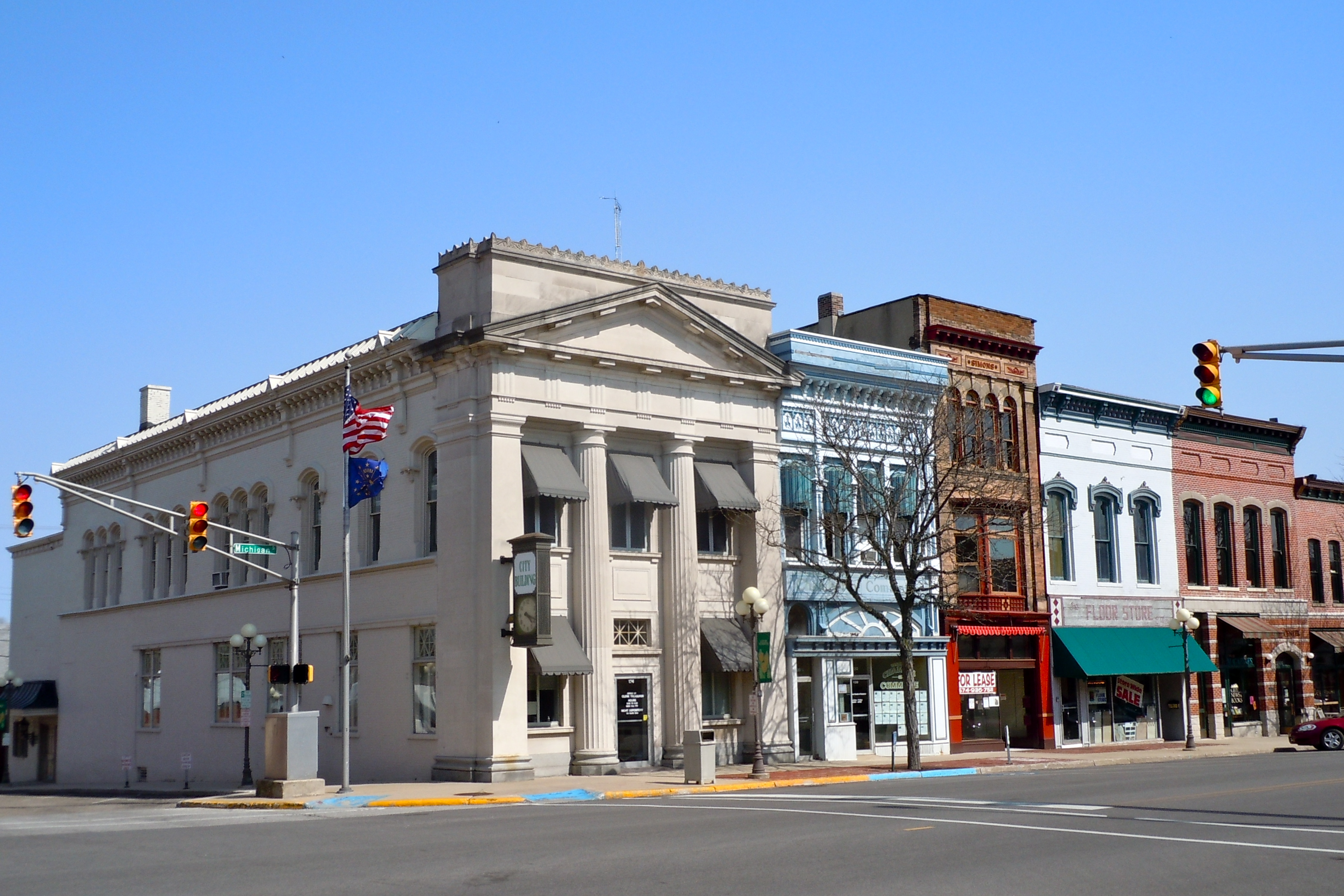
Plymouth Downtown Historic District has been on the NRHP since December 17, 1998. The historic district is roughly bounded by Center, Washington, and Water Streets, and the Yellow River, Plymouth, Marshall County, Indiana. The leftmost building is City Hall, located on the southeastern corner of the junction of Michigan (State Road 17) and Garro Streets.

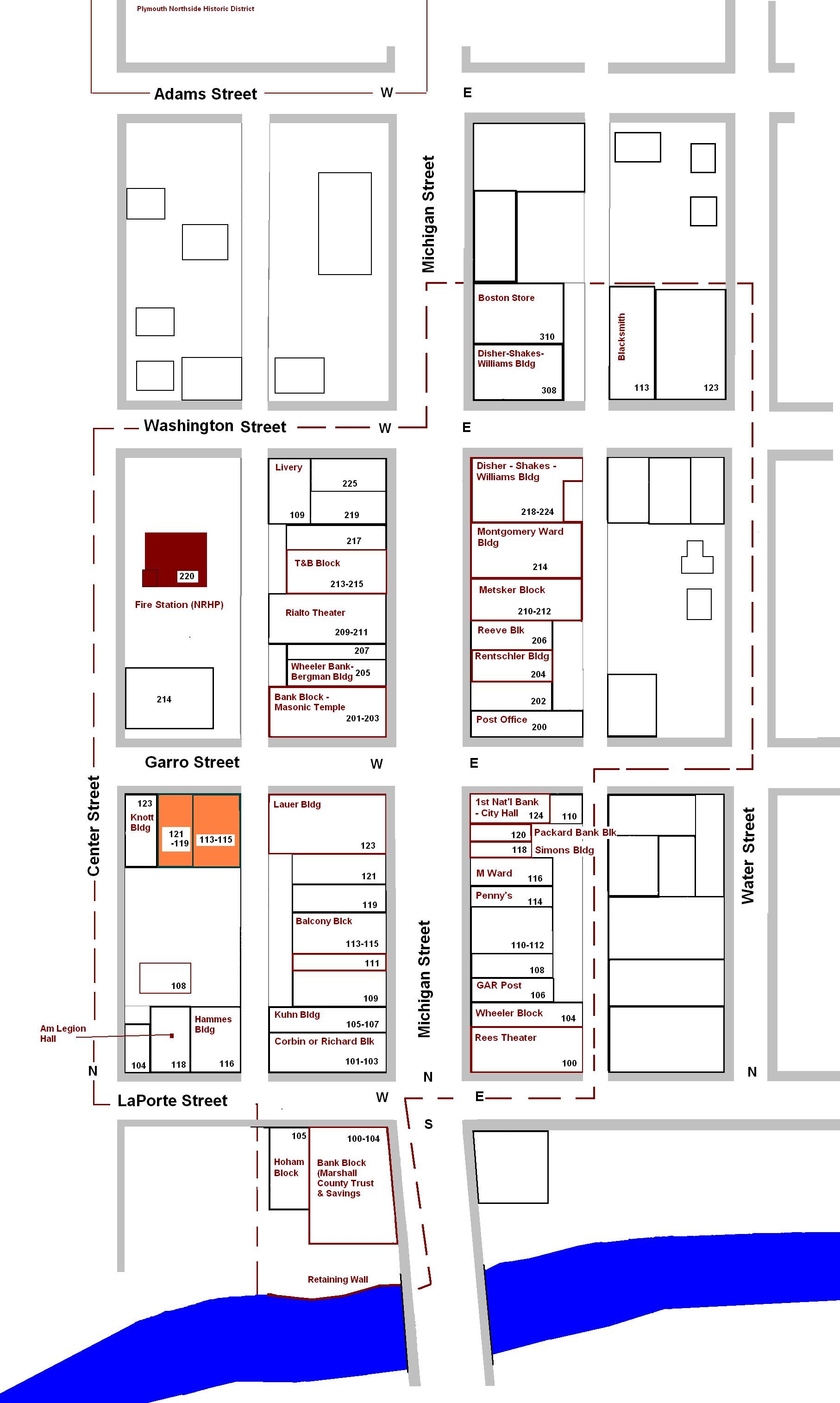

The district extends along the Michigan Road, now Michigan Street. The cross street at the southern end of the district is the LaPorte Trail or LaPorte Street, which runs between the Pennsylvania Railroad Depot on the west and the East Laporte Street Footbridge (National Register) on the east, over the Yellow River. Garro Street bi-sects the district. Just east of the district, Garro Street ends at the Yellow River, across from Lincoln High School, noted for its landscaping by Jens Jensen. The north end of the district is along Washington Street.

The width of Michigan Street allowed for wide sidewalks and angled parking. Over 90% of the buildings are two story structures, of 30 to 40 feet (9.1 to 12.2 m) in height. The facades are continuous, without a gap within the district. The eastern boundary (Water Street) and the western boundary (Central Street) have 60 feet (18 m) right-of-ways. Water Street consists principally of one story, twentieth century functional structures and is primarily commercial in nature.

== Notable buildings ==
Buildings have been identified in order of significance: C = Contributing towards the historic character of the district; N = Notable for preservation and architectural style; O = Outstanding structure that may have significant historic values to be designated an historic property on its own.

- West Garro Street (North Side)
  - 124 Post Office; Colonial Revival, 1935 (Joe H. Wildermuth, architect) (C)
- West La Porte Street (South Side)
  - 111 - Centennial Opera House; Italianate, 109 1876 (N)
- North Center Street (East Side)
  - 108 House; Gable-front/Gothic Revival, c.1870 (N)
  - 220 Plymouth Fire Station; Italianate, 1875 (Robert McCance and William P. Beaton, builders) (O)
- North Michigan Street (West Side)
  - 101 - Richard Building; Neoclassical, 103 c.1910 (C)
  - 123 Lauer Building; Neoclassical, 1910 (N)
  - 201-203 Bank Block/Masonic Temple; Neoclassical, 1901 (N)
  - 205 Bergman Building; Italianate, c.1890 (C)
  - 209-211 Rialto Theatre; Twentieth Century Functional, c.1920 (C)
  - 213-215 T and B Block; Neoclassical, c.1910 (N)

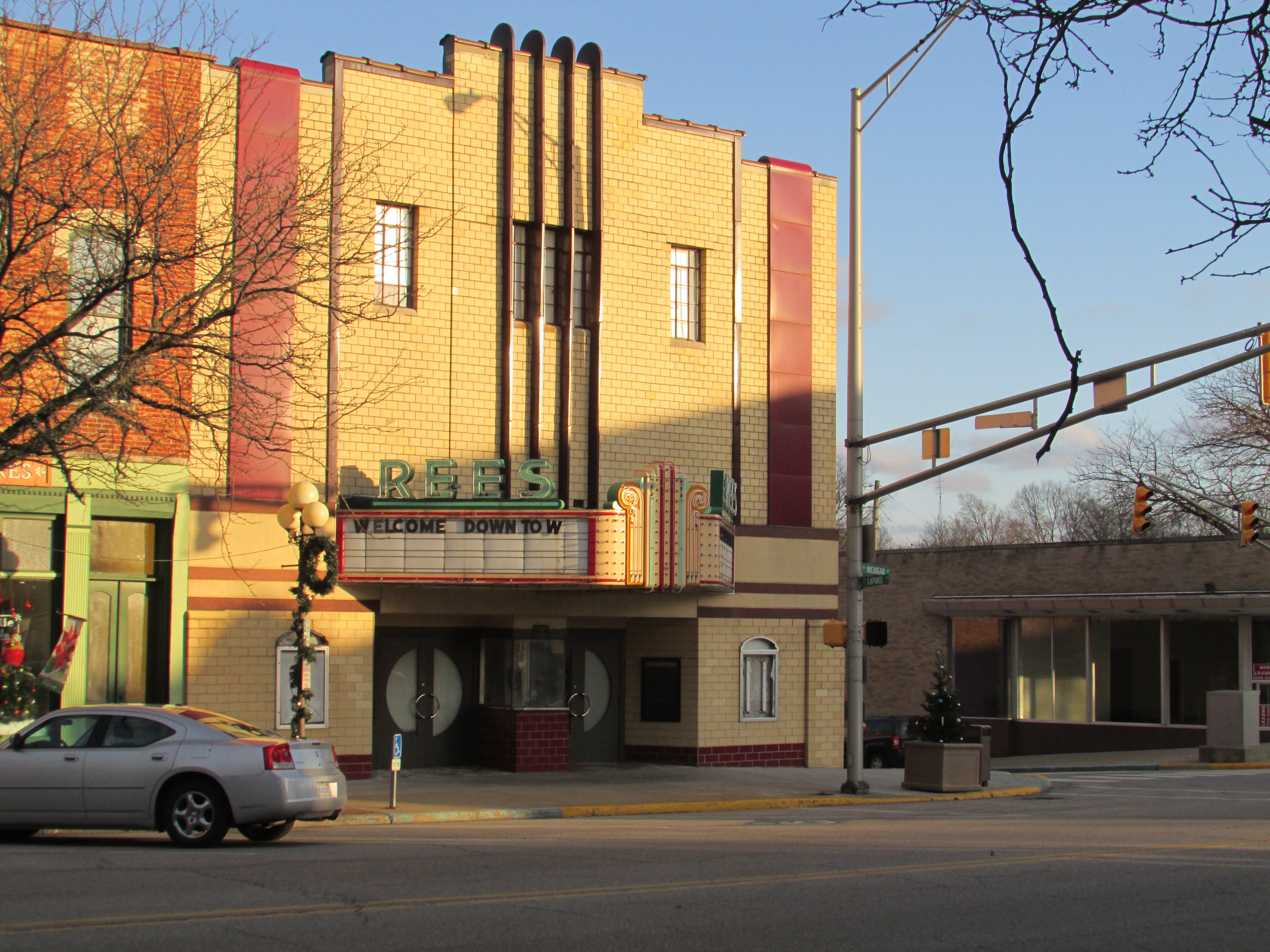
100 N Michigan (Rees Theater), Plymouth Downtown Historic District

- North Michigan Street (East Side)
  - 102 Rees Theatre; Art Deco, 1940 (Alves O'Keefe, architect) (N)
  - 120 Commercial Building; Italianate, c.1885 (N)
  - 124 First National Bank; Neoclassical, 1879/1916 (W. S. Mathews, architect, 1879 section) (O) (City Bldg 20160)
  - 204 Rentschler Building; Neoclassical, c.1910 (N)
  - 206 Reeve Block; Twentieth Century Functional, c.1910 (C)
  - 210-212 Metsker Block; Neoclassical, c.1910 (N)
  - 218- Disher-Shakes-Williams Building; 224 Neoclassical, c.1910 (N)

== See also ==
- East Laporte Street Footbridge
- Marshall County Courthouse (Indiana)
- Plymouth Downtown Historic District
- Plymouth Northside Historic District
- Plymouth Southside Historic District
- Plymouth Fire Station
