= Plymouth Fire Station =

- U.S. National Register of Historic Places
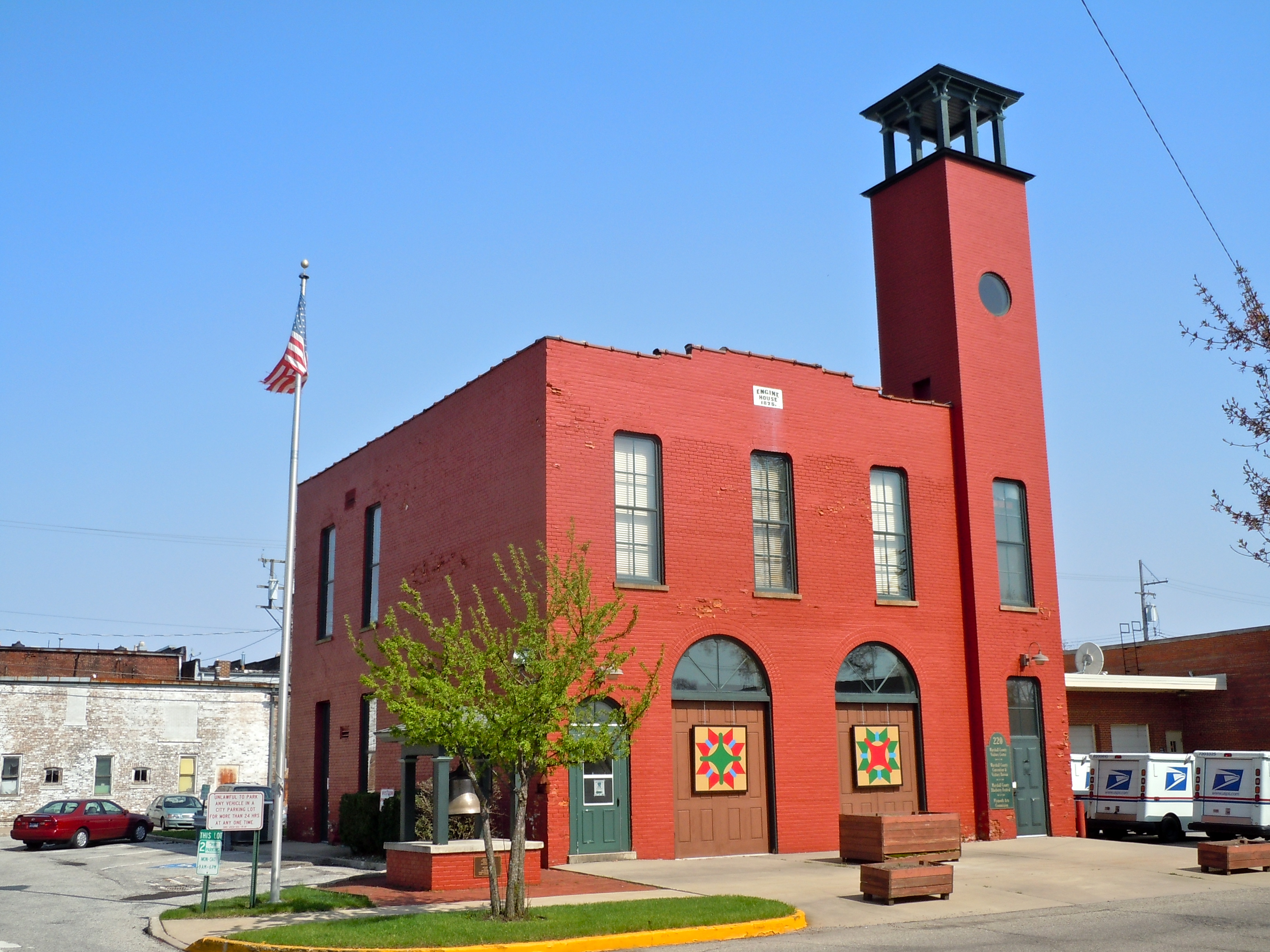
- Plymouth Fire Station, April 2011

- Location within Indiana Location within the United States
- Location: 220 N. Center St., Plymouth, Indiana
- Coordinates: 41°20′29″N 86°18′37″W
- Area: less than one acre
- Built: 1875
- Architect: McCance, Robert & Beaton, W.P.
- NRHP reference No.: 81000002
- Added to NRHP: July 9, 1981

Plymouth Fire Station is a historic fire station located at Plymouth, Indiana. It was built in 1875, and is a two-story, painted brick building with a 59-foot tall bell tower. It features round-arched pedestrian entrances and bays, parapet with tile coping, and a round window in the bell tower.

It was listed on the National Register of Historic Places in 1981. It is located in the Plymouth Downtown Historic District.

== See also ==
- East Laporte Street Footbridge
- Marshall County Courthouse (Indiana)
- Plymouth Downtown Historic District
- Plymouth Northside Historic District
- Plymouth Southside Historic District
- Plymouth Fire Station
