= Chief Menominee Memorial Site =

Historic site in Indiana, United States

- U.S. National Register of Historic Places
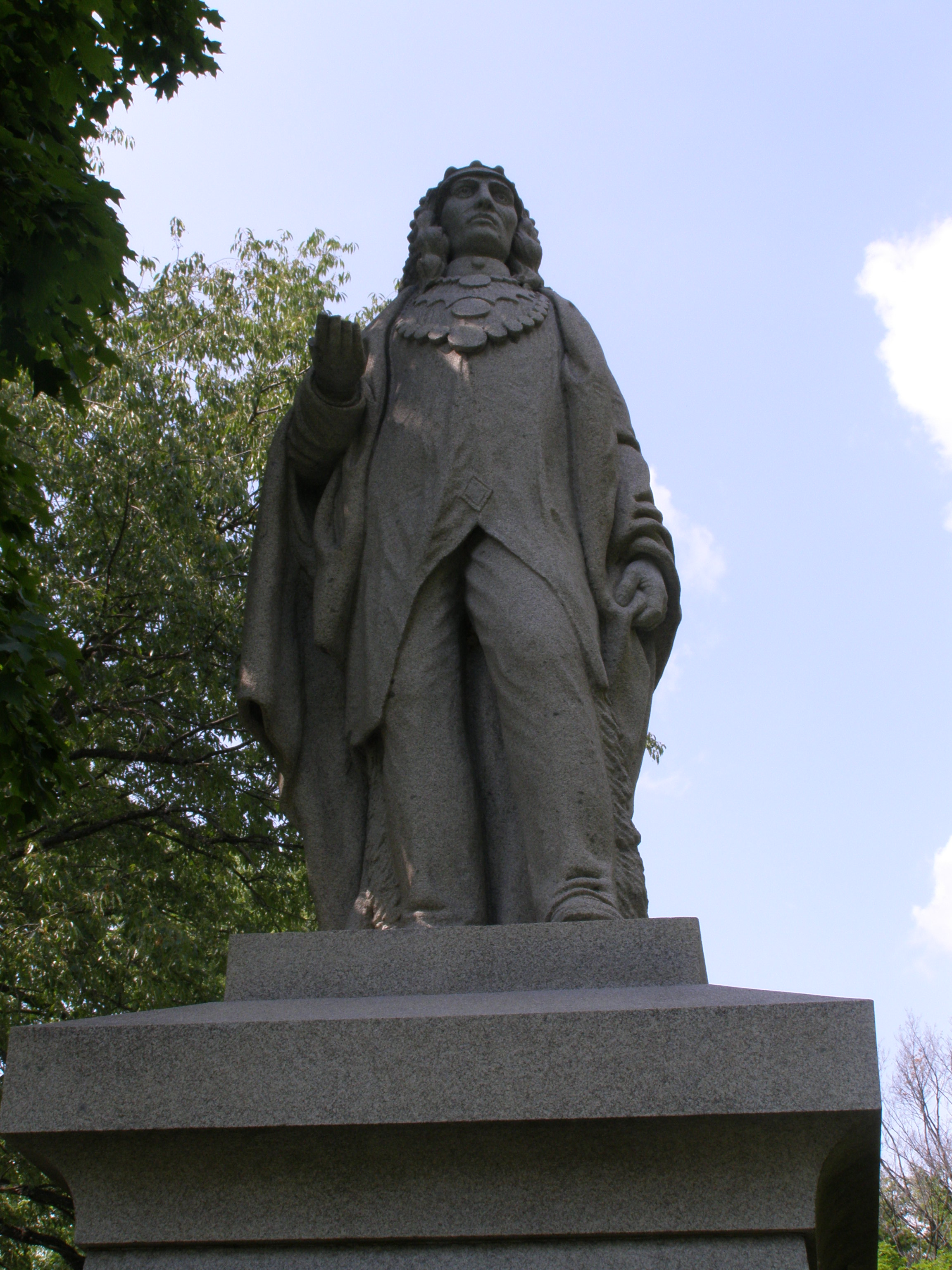
- Chief Menominee Statue, June 2007

- Location within Indiana Location within the United States
- Location: S. Peach Road (north of W. 13th Road and south of Twin Lakes)
- Nearest city: Plymouth, Indiana
- Coordinates: 41°17′43″N 86°21′43″W
- Area: 1 acre (0.40 ha)
- Built: 1909
- Built by: B.C. Southworth & Son
- Architects: Novelli & Calcagni Co.
- NRHP reference No.: 10001082
- Added to NRHP: December 27, 2010

Chief Menominee Memorial Site is a historic site located in West Township, Marshall County, Indiana. The memorial site was dedicated in 1909, and includes a triangular park, remains of the replica chapel foundation stones, and the Chief Menominee Monument. The log replica chapel was destroyed by fire in 1920. The Chief Menominee Monument is a 17-foot tall granite monument dedicated to the memory of Chief Menominee. It is the first monument to a Native American erected under a state or federal legislative enactment.

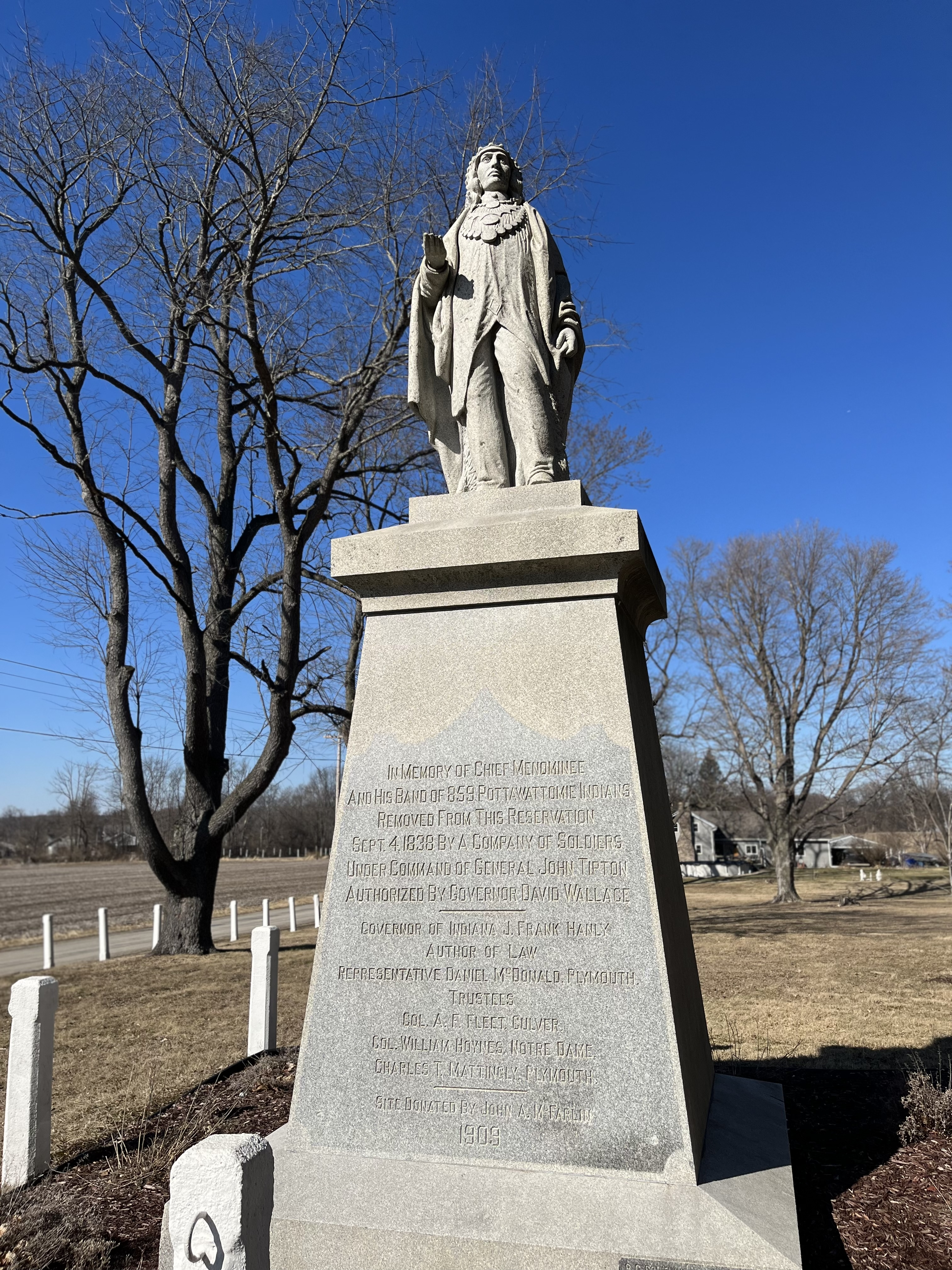

It was listed on the National Register of Historic Places in 2010.
