= Chief Menominee =

Potawatomi chief

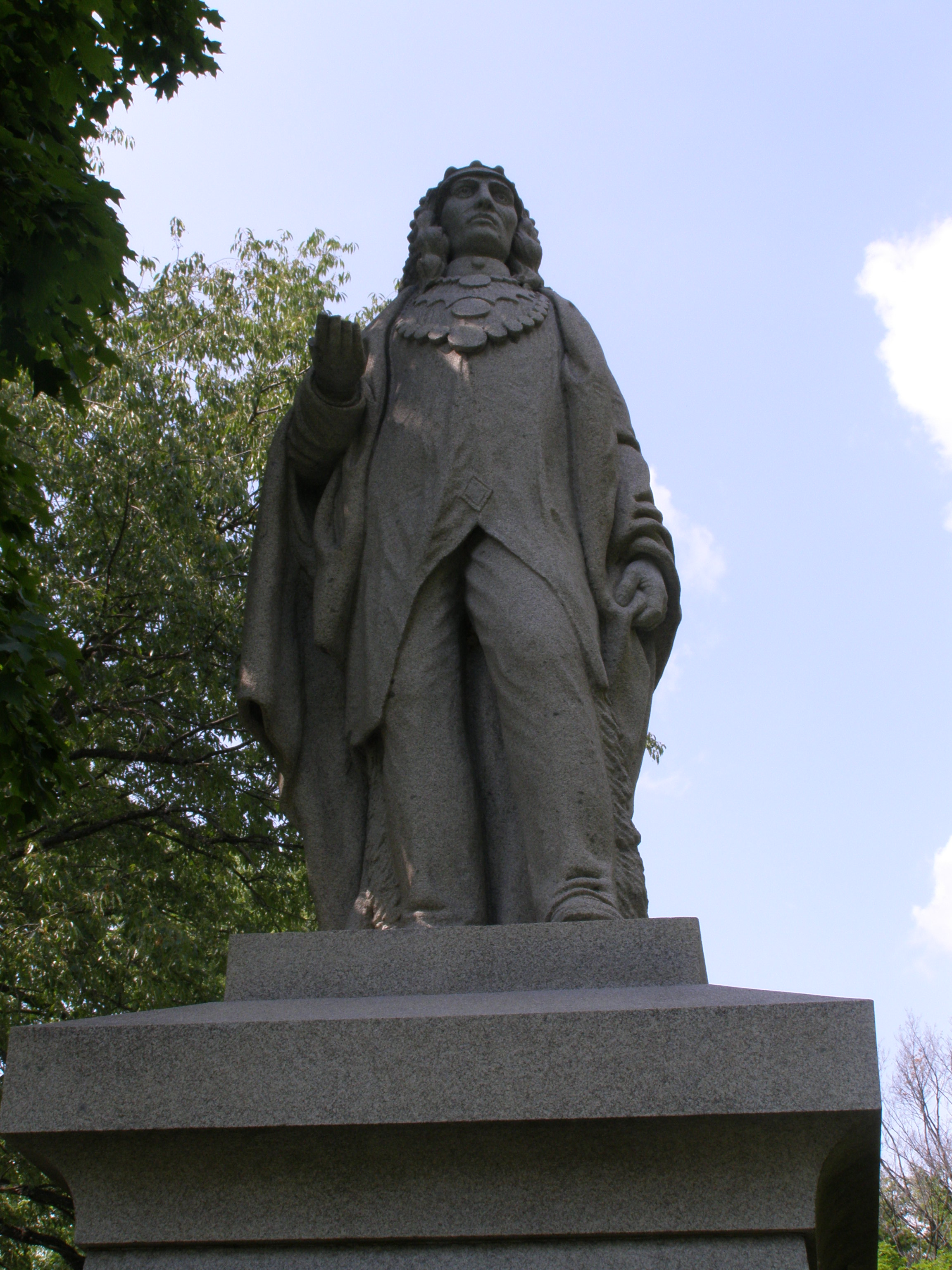
- Menominee Statue, Plymouth, Indiana
- Born: c. 1791
- Died: April 15, 1841; St. Marys, Kansas, U.S.
- Occupation: Pottawatomie chieftain
- Known for: Pottawatomie chieftain during the Trail of Death

Menominee (c. 1791 – April 15, 1841) was a Potawatomi chief and religious leader whose village on reservation lands at Twin Lakes, 5 miles (8.0 km) southwest of Plymouth in present-day Marshall County, Indiana, became the gathering place for the Potawatomi who refused to remove from their Indiana reservation lands in 1838. Their primary settlements were at present day Myers Lake and Cook Lake. Although Menominee's name and mark appear on several land cession treaties, including the Treaty of St. Mary's (1818), the Treaty of Mississinewas (1826), the Treaty of Tippecanoe (1832), and a treaty signed on December 16, 1834, he and other Potawatomi refused to take part in subsequent land cession negotiations, including the Treaty of Yellow River (1836), that directly led to the forced removal of Menominee's band from Indiana in 1838.

Despite his efforts to resist removal, Menominee was among the 859 Potawatomi who were forcibly removed from Twin Lakes, Indiana, to Indian reservation lands near present-day Osawatomie, Kansas, on what became known as the Potawatomi Trail of Death. The journey from September 4, 1838, to November 4, 1838, covered about 660 miles (1,060 km) over 61 days; 42 died (28 of them children) along the route. It was the single largest Indian removal from Indiana. Menominee survived the march to Kansas, but died less than three years later, and is buried at St. Marys, Kansas. In 1909, the state of Indiana erected a statue of him near the headwaters of the Yellow River, 3 miles (4.8 km) southwest of the present-day town of Plymouth, Indiana, near the site of his former village at Twin Lakes. It is the first monument to a Native American erected under a state or federal legislative enactment.

== Early life and education ==
Menominee was a Potawatomi native, whose exact date and location of birth are unknown. It is believed he was born around 1791, most likely in what is now the states of Wisconsin or Indiana. The Potawatomi were Algonquian-speaking people who became the second-largest tribal group in Indiana. They moved south from northern Wisconsin and Michigan to occupy a wide territory that included the southern tip of Lake Michigan to Lake Erie, an area encompassing northern Illinois, north central Indiana, and a strip across southern Michigan.

A series of land cession treaties with the federal government that began during Indiana's territorial era and continued into the 1830s required the Potawatomi and other tribes to relinquish nearly all their reservation lands in most of present-day Illinois and Indiana. Menominee and his band established a village on reservation lands at the headwaters of the Yellow River, near the Twin Lakes, 5 miles (8.0 km) southwest of Plymouth, in present-day Marshall County, Indiana.

== Religious alliance ==
Menominee became a religious leader known as the "Potawatomi Preacher" or the "Potawatomi Prophet", but he was never as well known as Tenskwatawa (The Prophet), a Shawnee spiritual leader. Menominee combined The Prophet's spiritual tenets with Roman Catholicism to create a new religion that would help his people cope with the changes caused by the growing influence of settlers and increased pressure by the federal government to cede the Potawatomi reservation lands in Indiana and move west. Menominee was known to have included prayer in his spiritual gatherings and urged the Potawatomi to abstain from drinking alcohol and other vices.

Menominee encouraged other religious groups to establish missions in northern Indiana. At a Fort Wayne council meeting in 1820, Menominee invited Isaac McCoy, a Baptist missionary, to visit Potawatomi villages in the Yellow River area. When the 1821 Treaty of Chicago provided federal funds for an Indian school, McCoy established the Carey Mission in 1823, at the present-day site of Niles, Michigan, but the school began to decline by 1826 and closed in 1830. It was replaced by a new Catholic mission near the Potawatomi community at Niles, where an earlier Jesuit mission had been in operation between 1690 and 1761. In 1830 Father Frederick Reze(e) baptized thirteen Potawatomi, including Potawatomi chief Leopold Pokagon and his son. After Father Rise(s)'s departure, Chief Pokagon petitioned the Catholic Church to send a new priest. Father Stephen T. Badin re-established the Saint Joseph mission in 1830 and was joined by Father Louis Deseille, another Jesuit missionary to the Pokagon community in 1833. Father Deseille expanded the Catholic mission to Menominee's Yellow River village at Twin Lakes in 1834. These two communities were at the heart of the regional resistance to removal in the 1830s. Father Deseille baptized Menominee on August 24, 1834, and the Potawatomi chief was given the Christian name of Alexis.

== Indian removal ==
Treaty of Tippecanoe
- Type: Land purchase
- Signed: October 26, 1832
- Location: Near Rochester, Indiana
- Condition: Transfer of money and goods to natives
- Parties: United States of America; Pottawatomie
- Language: English

Encouraged by President Andrew Jackson, the United States Congress passed the Indian Removal Act in 1830 to provide the federal government the authority to acquire Native American lands in the eastern states in exchange for territorial lands west of the Mississippi River and retention of their sovereign tribal status. After the passage of this Act, the federal government stepped up their efforts to secure Indian lands in the East. In a series of treaties from 1832 to 1840, the Potawatomi relinquished multiple tracts of Indiana land to the federal government. Menominee is listed as a signer on two of these treaties: the Treaty of Tippecanoe (October 26, 1832) and a treaty signed on December 16, 1834.

Menominee's signature with an "x" was recorded along with those of numerous other Potawatomi chiefs on the Treaty of Tippecanoe (1832). This series of three treaties negotiated with the Potawatomi at the Tippecanoe River, ceded Potawatomi land in Illinois, most of their remaining lands in northwestern and north central Indiana, and part of Michigan to the federal government in exchange for annuity payments, small reservation lands for tribal use, and scattered allotments to individuals. The Potawatomi also received the federal government's agreement to provide goods and assistance to support their migration efforts, should they decide to relocate. In addition, the treaty provided the bands under Potawatomi chiefs Menominee, Pee-pin-oh-waw, No-taw-kah, and Muck-kah-tah-mo-way a joint grant of 22 sections (14,080 acres) of reservation land in the Yellow River area. Menominee also signed a treaty on December 16, 1834, that ceded to the federal government two sections of their Indiana land and the Potawatomi mills; however, he refused to sign any further treaties that ceded his Indiana reservation lands to the federal government.

The Treaty of Yellow River (1836), which directly led to the forced removal of Menominee's band from Twin Lakes, was made on August 5, 1836. Menominee and seventeen of the Yellow River band who were living near Twin Lakes did not take part in the negotiations and refused to recognize the treaty's authority over their land. Under its terms the Potawatomi ceded to the federal government all of the reservation land that was granted to them under the Treaty of Tippecanoe of October 26, 1832. The Potawatomi who signed the Yellow River treaty also agreed to remove west of the Mississippi River within two years in exchange for the sale of their Indiana reservation lands and payment of tribal debts.

In fourteen treaties negotiated between December 4, 1834, and February 11, 1837, the remaining Potawatomi reservation land in Indiana was ceded to the federal government in exchange for payments in cash and goods. The signers of these treaties also agreed to remove within two years to land set aside for them west of the Mississippi River. Menominee's name and his "x" mark appear on a treaty dated December 16, 1834, but the treaty makes no reference to removal to lands west of Mississippi River. More importantly, Menominee was not among the signers of a key treaty made at Washington, D.C., on February 11, 1837, when the signers reconfirmed the Potawatomi land cessions in Indiana as outlined in the treaties of August 5, 1836, and September 23, 1836, and agreed to remove to reservation land on the Osage River, southwest of the Missouri River in present-day Kansas.

In a petition dated November 4, 1837, Menominee and other Potawatomi submitted a formal protest to John Tipton that claimed their signatures on the August 5, 1836, treaty at Yellow River had been forged (Menominee's name was omitted) and the names of other individuals who did not represent the tribe had been added. There is no record of a reply to this petition. Other petitions were sent to President Martin Van Buren and Secretary of War Lewis Cass in 1836 and 1837, but the federal government refused to change its position. Father Deseille, the Catholic missionary at Twin Lakes, also denounced the Yellow River Treaty (1836) as a fraud. Col. Pepper, the federal government's treaty negotiator, believed that Father Deseille was interfering with their plans for removal of the Potawatomi from Indiana, and ordered the priest to leave the mission at Twin Lakes or risk prosecution. Father Deseille complied under protest and left for South Bend, Indiana, where he died in September 1837. Father Benjamin Petit replaced Father Deseille at the Twin Lakes mission in November 1837. Within a few months Father Petit became resigned to the Potawatomi's removal.

Friction among the Potawatomi and the white settlers increased in the 1830s as the government made plans to open the Potawatomi reservation lands to new settlement. Squatters who anticipated the public sale of the lands quickly established themselves on the most desirable tracts of reservation land, leaving the remaining Potawatomi surrounded by white settlements. A compromise was reached, but it did not eliminate tension between the white settlers and the Potawatomi. To further complicate matters, the Potawatomi who had agreed to leave Indiana arrived at government camps near Menominee's village at Twin Lakes to prepare for removal west of the Mississippi River. Menominee's village on the Yellow River became the gathering place of those who refused to go.

When the deadline of August 5, 1838, arrived for the removal of Menominee and his band from Indiana, most of the Potawatomi had already left the state, but Menominee's group still refused to leave their village. On August 6, 1838, the day after the deadline for removal, Col. Pepper called a council at Menominee's village, where he explained that the Potawatomi had relinquished their land in Indiana under treaties previously signed and ratified by the United States Senate. The Potawatomi were given no option. The land now belonged to the federal government and the Potawatomi had to remove. Menominee responded through an interpreter:

The President does not know the truth. He, like me, has been imposed upon. He does not know that you made my young chiefs drunk and got their consent and pretended to get mine. He would not drive me from my home and the graves of my tribe, and my children, who have gone to the Great Spirit, nor allow you to tell me your braves will take me, tied like a dog, if he knew the truth. My brother, the President is just, but he listens to the word of young chiefs who have lied; and when he knows the truth, he will leave me to my own. I have not sold my lands. I will not sell them. I have not signed any treaty, and will not sign any. I am not going to leave my lands, and I do not want to hear anything more about it.

Despite Menominee's refusal to leave, white settlers continued to arrive at the Potawatomi reservation. Conflict soon erupted. The Potawatomi destroyed the squatters' huts, and the whites retaliated by burning a dozen of the Indians' cabins. Fear of further violence caused some settlers to petition Indiana governor David Wallace for protection. Wallace authorized General John Tipton to mobilize a local militia of one hundred volunteers to suppress the conflict and forcibly remove the Potawatomi from their Indiana reservation lands. The forced march became known as the Potawatomi Trail of Death, the single largest Indian removal in Indiana.

On August 29, 1838, General Tipton and his volunteer militia arrived and surrounded Menominee's village at Twin Lakes. A meeting was allegedly called at the village chapel, where the militia took the Potawatomi chiefs, including Menominee, into custody. Between Thursday, August 30, and Monday, September 3, 1838, Tipton and his men established a camp at Twin Lakes, gathered the Potawatomi still living on reservation lands, and began preparations for their removal from Indiana.

Menominee and his Yellow River band were among the 859 Potawatomi, many of them Christian, who were force-marched from Twin Lakes to Osawatomie, Kansas. The difficult journey, which began on September 4, 1838, covered about 660 miles (1,060 km) over 61 days. The caravan also included 286 horses, 26 wagons, and an armed escort of one hundred soldiers. In the early days of the journey six chiefs, including Menominee, were treated as prisoners and forced to ride in a wagon under armed guard. Father Petit, who received permission to join his parishioners on the march to Kansas, secured their release from the wagon at Danville, Illinois, after giving his word that they would not try to escape. Water was scarce along much of the trail. The quality of the food supplied by the federal government was so poor that the volunteer militia refused to eat it and demanded funds to buy their own rations. As the march passed through Indiana and Illinois, a typhoid epidemic spread among the Potawatomi and the settlers from nearby towns, More than three hundred became ill. Of the 859 who began the journey, Menominee was among the 756 Potawatomi who survived; 42 were recorded as having died (28 of them children) and the remainder escaped.

The Potawatomi reached their destination on the western bank of the Osage River, near the present-day site of Osawatomie, Kansas, on November 4, 1838. Upon their arrival, Menominee and the others were placed under the supervision of the local Indian agent and Reverend Christian Hoecken. In 1839, Menominee and the Potawatomi of the Woods, or Mission Band, moved about 20 miles (32 km) south to the Sugar Creek mission in Linn County, Kansas. Menominee died on April 15, 1841. He is buried at St. Mary's Mission, Kansas.

== Honors ==
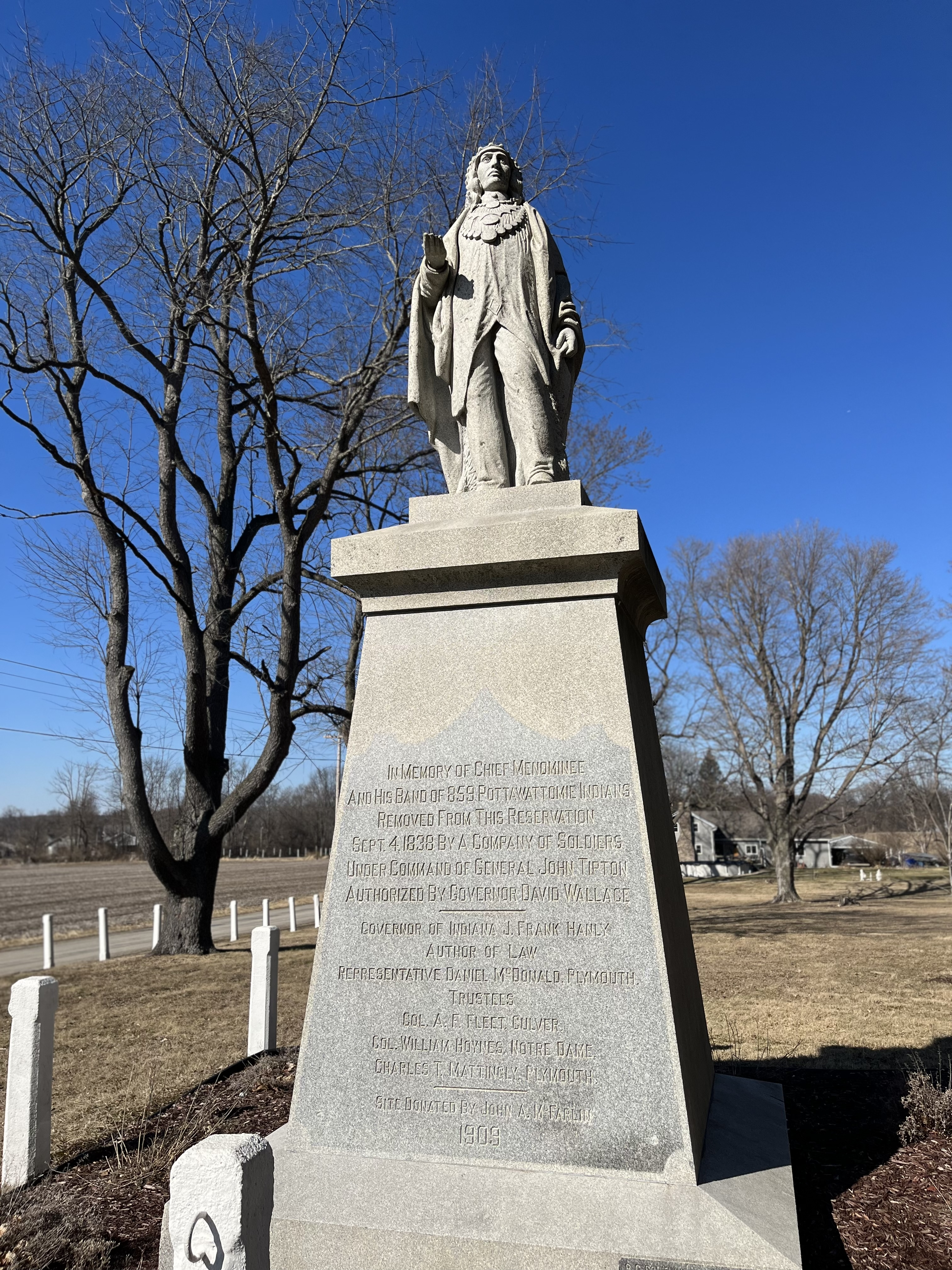
Full scale image of Chief Menominee Monument, February 2022

In 1909 the State of Indiana erected a statue of Chief Menominee near the headwaters of the Yellow River, 3 miles (4.8 km) southwest of the present-day town of Plymouth, Indiana. It is the first monument to a Native American erected under a state or federal legislative enactment. The Chief Menominee Memorial Site was listed on the National Register of Historic Places in 2010.

== See also ==
- List of treaties between the Potawatomi and the United States
- Indian removals in Indiana

== Sources ==
- Campion, Thomas J. (2011). "Indian Removal and the Transformation of Northern Indiana". Indiana Magazine of History. 107 (1). Bloomington: Indiana University: 32–62. doi:10.5378/indimagahist.107.1.0032.
- Carmony, Donald F. (1998). Indiana, 1816–1850: The Pioneer Era. The History of Indiana. Vol. II. Indianapolis: Indiana Historical Society. ISBN 0-87195-124-X.
- Dunn, Jacob Piatt (1908). True Indian Stories. Indianapolis, IN: Sentinel Printing Co. pp. 234–52.
- Edmunds, R. David (1978). The Potawatomis, Keepers of the Fire. The Civilization of American Indian. Vol. 145. Norman: University of Oklahoma Press. ISBN 978-0-80612-069-0.
- Funk, Arville (1983) [1969]. A Sketchbook of Indiana History. Rochester, Indiana: Christian Book Press.
- Glenn, Elizabeth; Stewart Rafert (2009). The Native Americans. Peopling Indiana. Vol. 2. Indianapolis: Indiana Historical Society Press. ISBN 978-0-87195-280-6.
- Hellman, Paul T. (2005). Historical Gazetteer of the United States. New York: Routledge. p. 326. ISBN 978-0-41593-9485.
- Hulst, Cornelia Steketee (1912). Indian Sketches: Père Marquette and the Last of the Pottawatomie Chiefs. New York: Longmans, Green. p. 43.
- Kappler, Charles J., comp. and ed. (1904). Indian Affairs: Laws and Treaties. Vol. II. U.S. Government Printing Office. Archived from the original on February 7, 2015.
- Madison, James H. (2014). Hoosiers: A New History of Indiana. Bloomington and Indianapolis: Indiana University Press and the Indiana Historical Society Press. ISBN 978-0-253-01308-8.
- McDonald, Daniel (1899). Removal of the Pottawattomie Indians from northern Indiana; embracing also a brief statement of the Indian policy of the government, and other historical matter relating to the Indian question. Indianapolis, IN: D. McDonald and Co.
- McKee, Irving (1939). "The Centennial of 'The Trail of Death'". Indiana Magazine of History. 35 (1). Bloomington: Indiana University: 27–41.
- McKee, Irving (1941). "The Trail of Death, Letters of Benjamin Marie Petit". Indiana Historical Society Publications. 14 (1). Indianapolis: Indiana Historical Society.
- Willard, Shirley, and Susan Campbell, comps. and eds. (2003). Potawatomi Trail of Death: 1838 Removal from Indiana to Kansas. Rochester, IN: Fulton County Historical Society.
