= Donaldson, Indiana =

- Census-designated place
- Location within Indiana Location within the United States
- Coordinates: 41°21′40″N 86°26′39″W
- Country: United States
- State: Indiana
- County: Marshall
- Township: West

Area
  - Total: 0.49 sq mi (1.3 km^{2})
  - Land: 0.49 sq mi (1.3 km^{2})
  - Water: 0.0 sq mi (0 km^{2})
- Elevation: 781 ft (238 m)
- ZIP code: 46513
- FIPS code: 18-18388
- GNIS feature ID: 433626

Donaldson is an unincorporated community and census-designated place (CDP) in West Township, Marshall County, Indiana, United States. It is home to Ancilla College and the American motherhouse of the Poor Handmaids of Jesus Christ.

== History ==
Donaldson (also historically spelled "Donelson") was laid out in 1871. A post office has been in operation there since 1871.

== Geography ==
Donaldson is located in western Marshall County at 41°21′40″N 86°26′39″W. U.S. Route 30 runs along the northern edge of the community, leading east 7 miles (11 km) to Plymouth, the county seat, and west 3 miles (5 km) to Grovertown.

According to the U.S. Census Bureau, the Donaldson CDP has an area of 0.49 square miles (1.27 km^{2}), all land.

== Demographics ==
The United States Census Bureau first delineated Donaldson as a census designated place in the 2022 American Community Survey.
