= Ramsay–Fox Round Barn and Farm =

- U.S. National Register of Historic Places
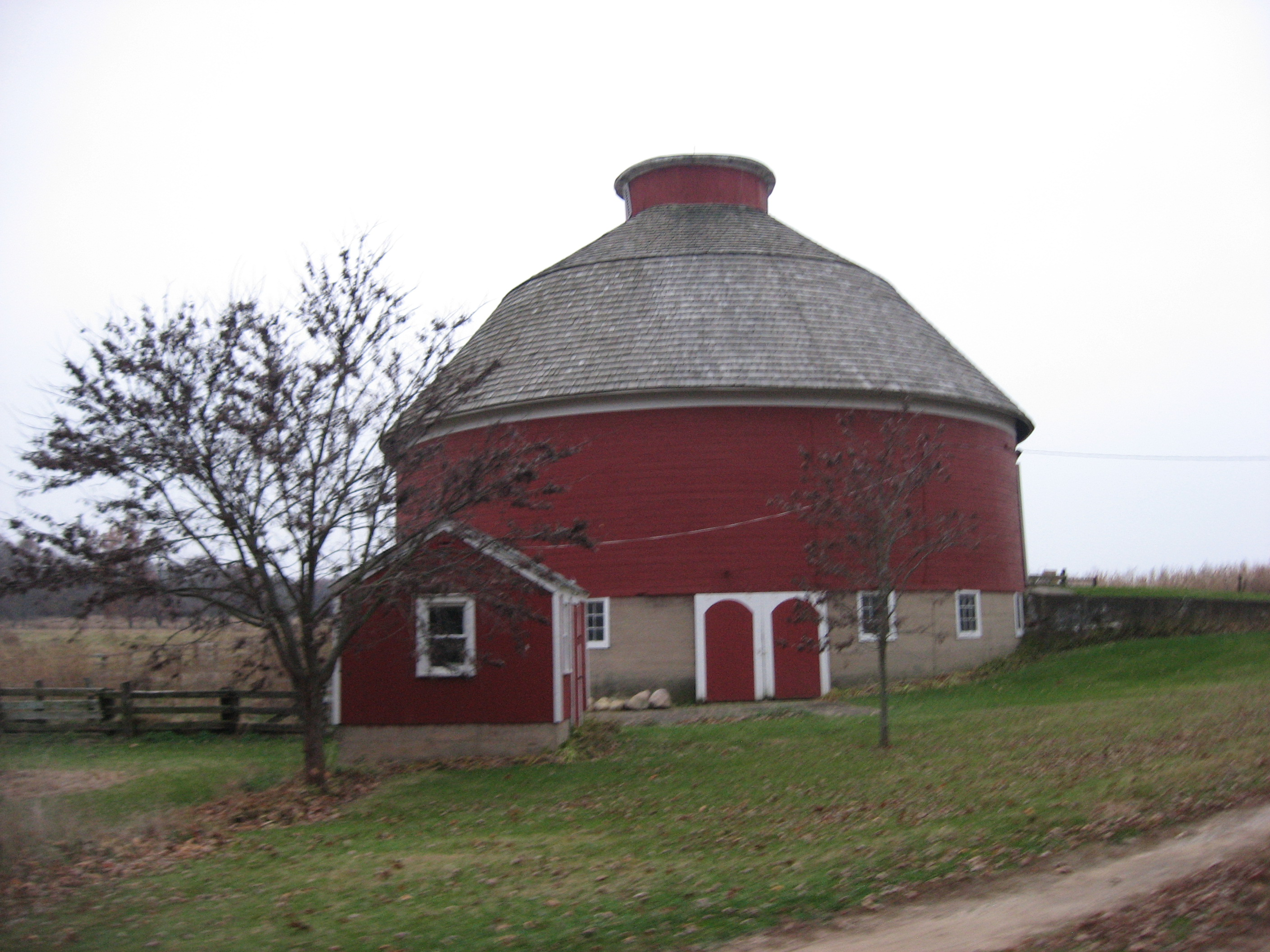
- Ramsay–Fox Round Barn, November 2013

- Location within Indiana Location within the United States
- Location: 18889 9th Rd., west of Plymouth, Indiana
- Coordinates: 41°20′45″N 86°25′20″W
- Area: 3.8 acres (1.5 ha)
- Built: c. 1900, c. 1911, c. 1920
- Built by: Ramsay, George W.
- Architectural style: Round Barn
- MPS: Round and Polygonal Barns of Indiana
- NRHP reference No.: 12000187
- Added to NRHP: April 10, 2012

Ramsay–Fox Round Barn and Farm is a historic round barn and farm in West Township, Marshall County, Indiana. The farmstead was established about 1900. The round barn was built about 1911 and is a true-circular barn, with a 60-foot (18 m) diameter. It has a two-pitch gambrel roof topped by a cupola and consists of a main level and basement. Also contributing are the farm site, farmhouse (c. 1900), milk house (c. 1900), windmill (c. 1920), and privy (c. 1900).

It was listed on the National Register of Historic Places in 2012.
