= Zentis =

German confectionery manufacturer

Zentis GmbH & Co. KG

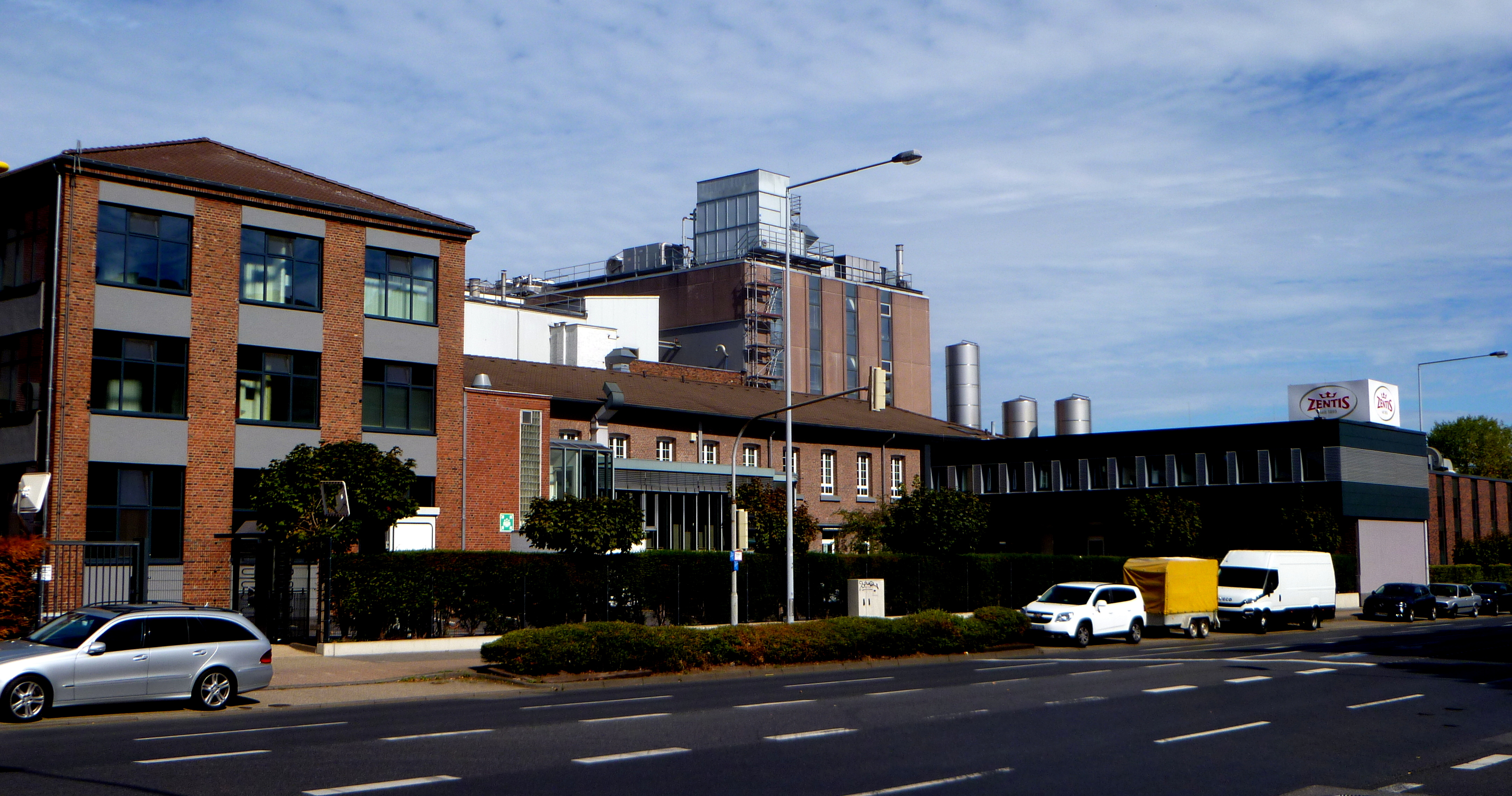
- Zentis's main factory in Aachen
- Type: Private
- Industry: Confectionery
- Founded: 20 June 1893; 133 years ago
- Founder: Franz Zentis
- Headquarters: Aachen, Germany
- Key people: Karl-Heinz Johnen, Hamed Hesami
- Products: fruit prepariations, sweet spreads, confectionery products
- Brands: 75% Frucht, 50% weniger Zucker (fruit spreads), Original Aachener Pflümli, Original Aachener Pflümli Zimt (plum jam), Nusspli, Belmandel (sweet creams), traditional seasonal marzipan, MyCorn cereal snack
- Revenue: (€711 million (2022))
- Number of employees: (1,960 (2022, on average))
- Website: zentis.de

Zentis is a German jam and confectionery manufacturer. It supplies finished products to customers and also to companies, especially dairy product industries, for which it is the market leader in Europe.

Fruit preparations, jams and sweet creams are produced at the production sites at the company headquarters in Aachen. Marzipan, chocolate and cereal specialties are manufactured in Eilendorf. Zentis also has manufacturing subsidiaries in Hungary, Poland, the U.S. and Russia, which produce fruit preparations for the dairy, ice cream and baked goods in particular, as well as confectionery. In 2012, Zentis acquired the company Sweet Ovations LLC and with it two more production plants in the U.S.

In 2019, as one of the largest fruit processing companies in Europe, the group employed an average of 2,137 employees and achieved a turnover of approximately 670 million euros, of which almost three quarters were fruit preparations for the dairy industry (e. g. yoghurt, quark or drinks).

== History ==
=== Years of foundation and first business successes ===
The company was established by Franz Zentis on 20 June 1893 in Aachen as a trading company. Real breakthrough came in 1900, with the production of FAMOS, a jam made from dried apricots and sugar. The name FAMOS stands for "Feinste Aprikosen Marmelade Ohne Sirup" or Finest Apricot Jam Without Syrup. Local bakeries used this as a filling for their pastries.

In the 1960s, Zentis entered the dairy industry and developed fruit preparations with banana and pineapple for yogurts, quarks and drinks. In the mid-60s, Zentis developed warm flavours for the dairy industry. In the 1970s, sweet nut spreads, such as Nusspli, were added. In addition, the packaging was changed to plastic.

In 1998, Zentis was the first company to invent chocolate chips that do not dissolve in yoghurt. This is how stracciatella yoghurt was created for the first time.

=== Expansion and internationalisation ===
Zentis expanded into Poland in 1997, into Hungary in 2000 and Russia in 2003. More factories followed in the U.S. in 2007 and 2012.

In 2011, Zentis began producing savory vegetable preparations for dairy products and baked goods. The preparations are produced in Poland. Within a short time of entering the market, Zentis was already one of the market leaders.

=== Awards ===
2017 and 2018, Zentis was awarded the Bundesehrenpreis (Federal Award of Honour) by the federal ministry for nutrition and agriculture. The price honors continuous quality control, and striving for the highest possible standards of quality. Zentis was the first fruit processing company to receive this award.

Pope Benedict XVI is among the company's patrons; every December near Christmas, a German banker from Bavaria, a Munich native named Thaddaeus Joseph Kuehnel, hand-delivers sweets from the company to the Vatican, along with Bavarian sausages from the Pope's favourite restaurant, Franziskaner, and special mustard.

== Production sites ==
=== Europe ===
- Aachen (Germany)
  - production of fruit preparations, jams and sweet creams as well the production of confectionery (857 employees).
- Eilendorf (Germany)
  - production of marzipan, chocolate and cereal specialties (175 employees).
- Zelków (Poland)
  - production of fruit preparations for the dairy, ice-cream and bakery industries.
- Drégelypalánk (Hungary)
  - production of fruit preparations for the dairy, ice-cream and bakery industries.

=== U.S. ===
- Plymouth (Indiana)
  - production of fruit preparations for the dairy, ice-cream and bakery industries.
- Philadelphia (Pennsylvania)
  - production of fruit preparations for the dairy, ice-cream and bakery industries.

=== Russia ===
- Khimki near Moscow
  - product development and distribution of fruit preparations for the Eastern European market and sells fruit preparations for the dairy, ice-cream, bakery and confectionery industries in Moscow and Raos.

== Products ==
Zentis produces fruit preparations for the dairy industry, for the non-dairy industry (e.g. bakery and confectionery industry), Sweet spreads (gourmet jams, jellies and sweet cream spreads for retailers and large-scale consumers) as well as Confectionery products (marzipan, chocolate and cereal specialities for retailers and industry).

Brands for the end consumer are 75% Frucht, 50 % weniger Zucker (fruit spreads), Original Aachener Pflümli, Original Aachener Pflümli Zimt (plum jam), Nusspli, Belmandel (sweet creams),Traditional seasonal marzipan, MyCorn cereal snack.

The 50 % weniger Zucker spread made by Zentis is awarded the Product of the Year 2020.

In 2024 Zentis became the largest manufacturer of U.S. made popping boba. The products are marketed under a new brand Kültee Kaviar by Zentis.

== Engagement ==
Every Thursday, Zentis provides free admission to the Ludwig Forum (museum) near the company headquarters.
