= West Township, Marshall County, Indiana =

West Township
- Township
- Location in Marshall County
- Coordinates: 41°19′30″N 86°24′18″W
- Country: United States
- State: Indiana
- County: Marshall

Government
  - Type: Indiana township

Area
  - Total: 43.26 sq mi (112.0 km^{2})
  - Land: 41.99 sq mi (108.8 km^{2})
  - Water: 1.27 sq mi (3.3 km^{2}) 2.94%
- Elevation: 790 ft (240 m)

Population (2020)
  - Total: 3,849
  - Density: 95.4/sq mi (36.8/km^{2})
- ZIP codes: 46511, 46513, 46563
- GNIS feature ID: 0454046
- Website: www.in.gov/townships/west50/

West Township is one of ten townships in Marshall County, Indiana, United States. As of the 2020 census, its population was 3,849 (down from 4,008 at 2010) and it contained 1,684 housing units.

== History ==
West Township was organized in 1854.

The Chief Menominee Memorial Site and Ramsay-Fox Round Barn and Farm are listed on the National Register of Historic Places.

== Geography ==
According to the 2010 census, the township has a total area of 43.26 square miles (112.0 km^{2}), of which 41.99 square miles (108.8 km^{2}) (or 97.06%) is land and 1.27 square miles (3.3 km^{2}) (or 2.94%) is water.

=== Cities, towns, villages ===
- Plymouth (west edge)

=== Unincorporated towns ===
- Donaldson at 41.361155°N 86.444176°W
- Twin Lakes at 41.304210°N 86.357229°W

(This list is based on USGS data and may include former settlements.)

=== Cemeteries ===
The township contains these three cemeteries: Donaldson, McElrath and Mount Carmel.

=== Major highways ===
- US 30
- SR 8
- SR 17

=== Airports and landing strips ===
- Gibson Airport
- H J Umbaugh Airport

=== Lakes ===
- Cook Lake
- Flat Lake
- Gilbert Lake
- Holem Lake
- Kreighbaum Lake
- Pretty Lake
- Thomas Lake

== Education ==
- Plymouth Community School Corporation

West Township residents may obtain a free library card from the Plymouth Public Library in Plymouth.

== Political districts ==
- Indiana's 2nd congressional district
- State House District 17
- State Senate District 5
