= Plymouth Northside Historic District =

Historic district in Indiana, United States

- U.S. National Register of Historic Places
- U.S. Historic district
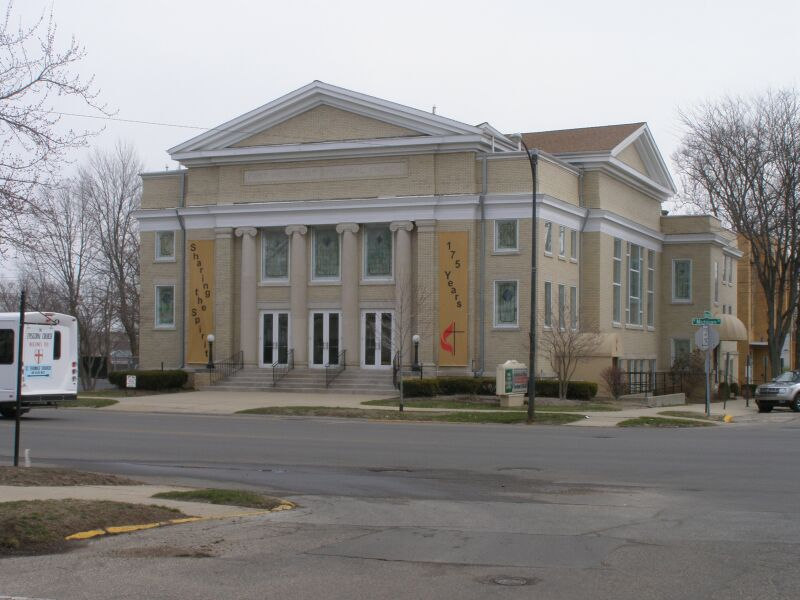
- First United Methodist Church, April 2011

- Location within Indiana Location within the United States
- Location: Center and Michigan Sts. between Adams and Novelty Sts., and the blocks surrounding the courthouse square, Plymouth, Indiana
- Coordinates: 41°20′42″N 86°18′40″W
- Area: 41.5 acres (16.8 ha)
- Built by: Ness, Jacob
- Architect: O'Keefe, Alves; Randall, G. P.
- Architectural style: Italianate, Gothic Revival, Queen Anne, Colonial Revival, Tudor Revival, Neoclassical, Renaissance Revival
- NRHP reference No.: 13000760
- Added to NRHP: September 25, 2013

Plymouth Northside Historic District is a national historic district located at Plymouth, Indiana. The district encompasses 141 contributing buildings, 2 contributing sites, 6 contributing structures, and 3 contributing objects in a predominantly residential section of Plymouth. It developed between about 1870 and 1940, and includes examples of Italianate, Gothic Revival, Queen Anne, Colonial Revival, Tudor Revival, Neoclassical, and Renaissance Revival style architecture. Located in the district is the separately listed Marshall County Courthouse. Other notable contributing resources include Magnetic Park (c. 1885, 1937), First United Methodist Church (1914–1915), J.C. Capron House (1900), Samuel Schlosser House (1910–1911), Clay Metsker House (1917–1918), Plymouth Church of the Brethren (1950–1951), Logan-Stanley Fountain (c. 1902), Stevens House (1895), and First Presbyterian Church (1896–1897).

It was listed on the National Register of Historic Places in 2013.

== See also ==
- East Laporte Street Footbridge
- Marshall County Courthouse (Indiana)
- Plymouth Downtown Historic District
- Plymouth Northside Historic District
- Plymouth Southside Historic District
- Plymouth Fire Station
