= Heminger Travel Lodge =

- U.S. National Register of Historic Places
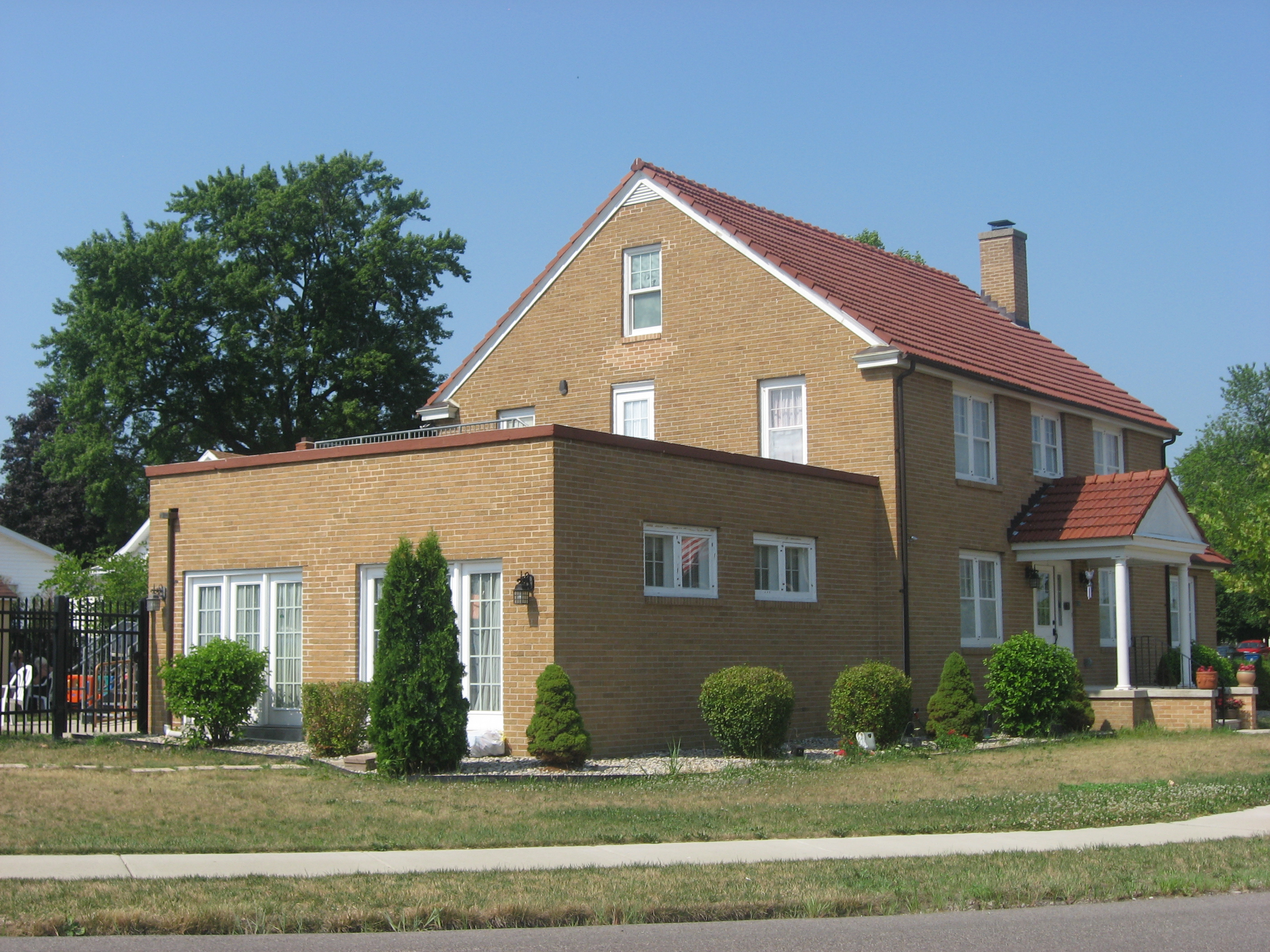
- Heminger Travel Lodge, July 2012

- Location within Indiana Location within the United States
- Location: 800 Lincolnway East, Plymouth, Indiana
- Coordinates: 41°20′37″N 86°17′59″W
- Area: 0.3 acres (0.12 ha)
- Built: 1937
- Architectural style: Colonial Revival
- NRHP reference No.: 00001629
- Added to NRHP: January 11, 2001

Heminger Travel Lodge is a historic hotel located on the Lincoln Highway at Plymouth, Indiana. It was built in 1937, and is a two-story, Colonial Revival style brown brick building with a red clay tile gable roof. Attached to the building is a one-story "sun porch" with a hipped roof.

It was listed on the National Register of Historic Places in 2000.
