= Plymouth Southside Historic District =

Historic district in Indiana, United States

- U.S. National Register of Historic Places
- U.S. Historic district
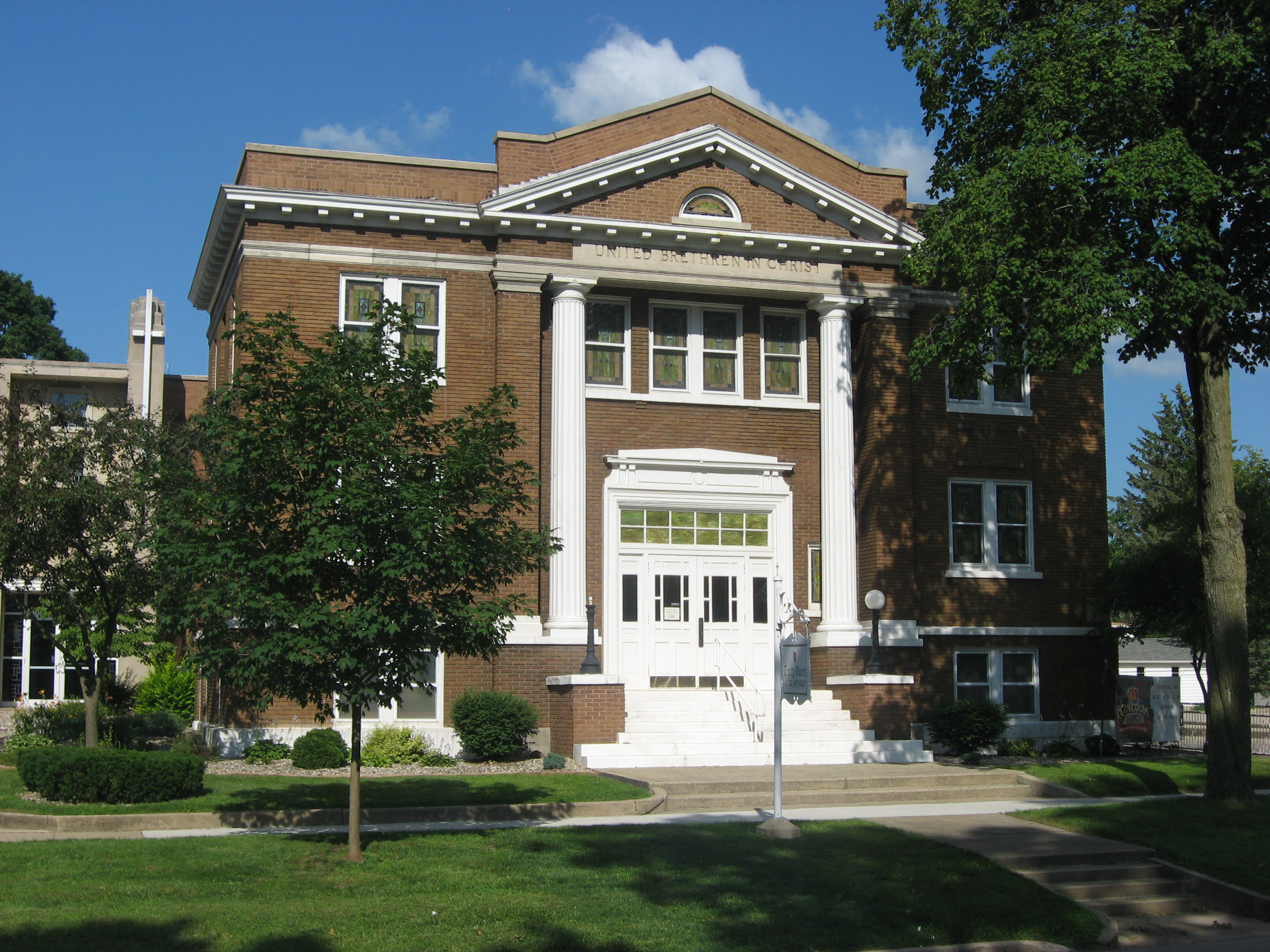
- Trinity United Methodist Church, July 2013

- Location within Indiana Location within the United States
- Location: Center and Michigan Sts. between Adams and Novelty Sts., and the blocks surrounding the courthouse square, Plymouth, Indiana
- Coordinates: 41°20′42″N 86°18′40″W
- Area: 81 acres (33 ha)
- Built by: Ness, Jacob
- Architect: Foker, William; Mathews, William S.
- Architectural style: Italianate, Greek Revival, Queen Anne, Colonial Revival, Tudor Revival
- NRHP reference No.: 13001016
- Added to NRHP: December 31, 2013

Plymouth Southside Historic District is a national historic district located at Plymouth, Indiana. The district encompasses 91 contributing buildings, 2 contributing structures, and 1 contributing object in a predominantly residential section of Plymouth. It developed between about 1853 and 1953, and includes examples of Italianate, Greek Revival, Queen Anne, Colonial Revival, and Tudor Revival style architecture. Notable contributing resources include the John McFarlin, Jr., House (c. 1860), Trinity United Methodist Church (1926), Bible Baptist Church (1894), Felke Florist and Greenhouse (1922), John Soice Residence (c. 1875), Westervelt-Marble Residence (c. 1865, 1899), and Edwards-Gambel Residence (1856).

It was listed on the National Register of Historic Places in 2013.

== See also ==
- East Laporte Street Footbridge
- Marshall County Courthouse (Indiana)
- Plymouth Downtown Historic District
- Plymouth Northside Historic District
- Plymouth Southside Historic District
- Plymouth Fire Station
