= Twin Lakes, Indiana =

- Unincorporated community
- Location within Indiana Location within the United States
- Coordinates: 41°18′15″N 86°21′26″W
- Country: United States
- State: Indiana
- County: Marshall
- Township: West
- Elevation: 810 ft (250 m)
- ZIP Code: 46563
- FIPS code: 18-76994
- GNIS feature ID: 449739

Twin Lakes is an unincorporated community in West Township, Marshall County, Indiana, United States.

== History ==
Twin Lakes contained a post office from 1887 until 1907. The community's proximity to two lakes caused its name to be selected.

== Geography ==
Twin Lakes is located at 41°18′15″N 86°21′26″W.
