= East LaPorte Street Footbridge =

- East Laporte Street Footbridge
- U.S. National Register of Historic Places
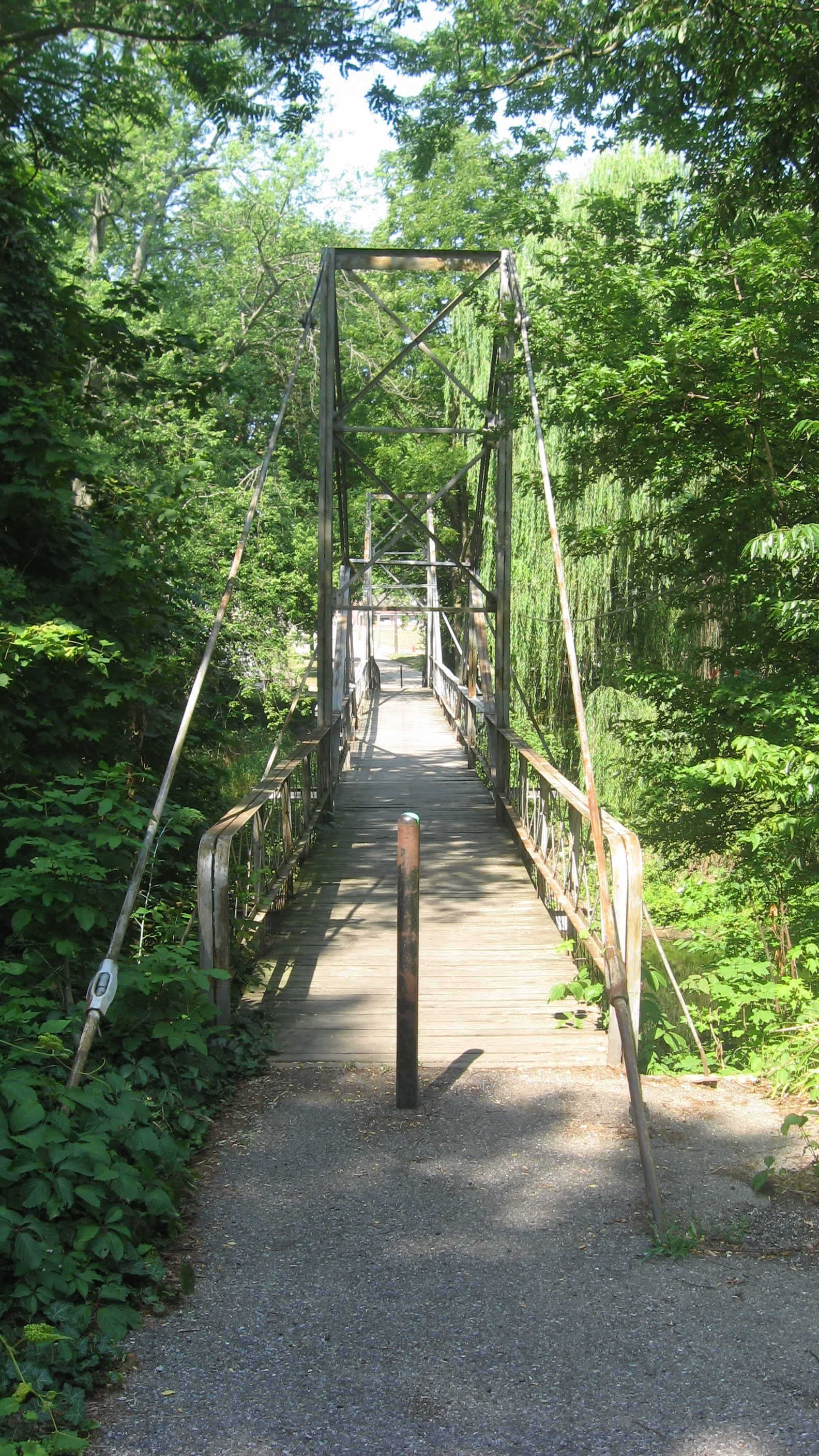
- East Laporte Street Footbridge, July 2012

- Location within Indiana Location within the United States
- Location: Spans Yellow River, Plymouth, Indiana
- Coordinates: 41°20′25″N 86°18′15″W
- Area: 1 acre (0.40 ha)
- Built: 1898
- Built by: Rochester Bridge Company
- Architectural style: 2-Span Kingpost
- NRHP reference No.: 81000001
- Added to NRHP: July 23, 1981

East LaPorte Street Footbridge is a historic footbridge located at Plymouth, Indiana. It was built in 1898 by the Rochester Bridge Company and spans the Yellow River. It is a two-span, Kingpost truss bridge measuring 100 feet long and 6 feet wide. The bridge connects a residential area of Plymouth to River Park Square and downtown.

It was listed on the National Register of Historic Places in 1981.

== Rehabilitation ==
In early 2023, a rehabilitation project was completed with the aim of extending the lifespan of the bridge structure to 30 years and reducing lateral deflections. Key components of the project included the replacement of timber decking with composite decking, as well as the replacement of floor-beams and stringers. The project also involved the removal of pack rust from exposed steel components, along with cleaning and painting. Pedestrian access was improved by updating the bridge approaches and installing new lighting along the railing and truss members for safety. Bank protection on the east bank of the Yellow River was replaced with new riprap, and similar measures were taken around each bridge pier and along the cut bank on the west side of the river.

== See also ==
- East Laporte Street Footbridge
- Marshall County Courthouse (Indiana)
- Plymouth Northside Historic District
- Plymouth Southside Historic District
