= Marshall County Courthouse (Indiana) =

- Marshall County Court House
- U.S. National Register of Historic Places
- U.S. Historic district – Contributing property
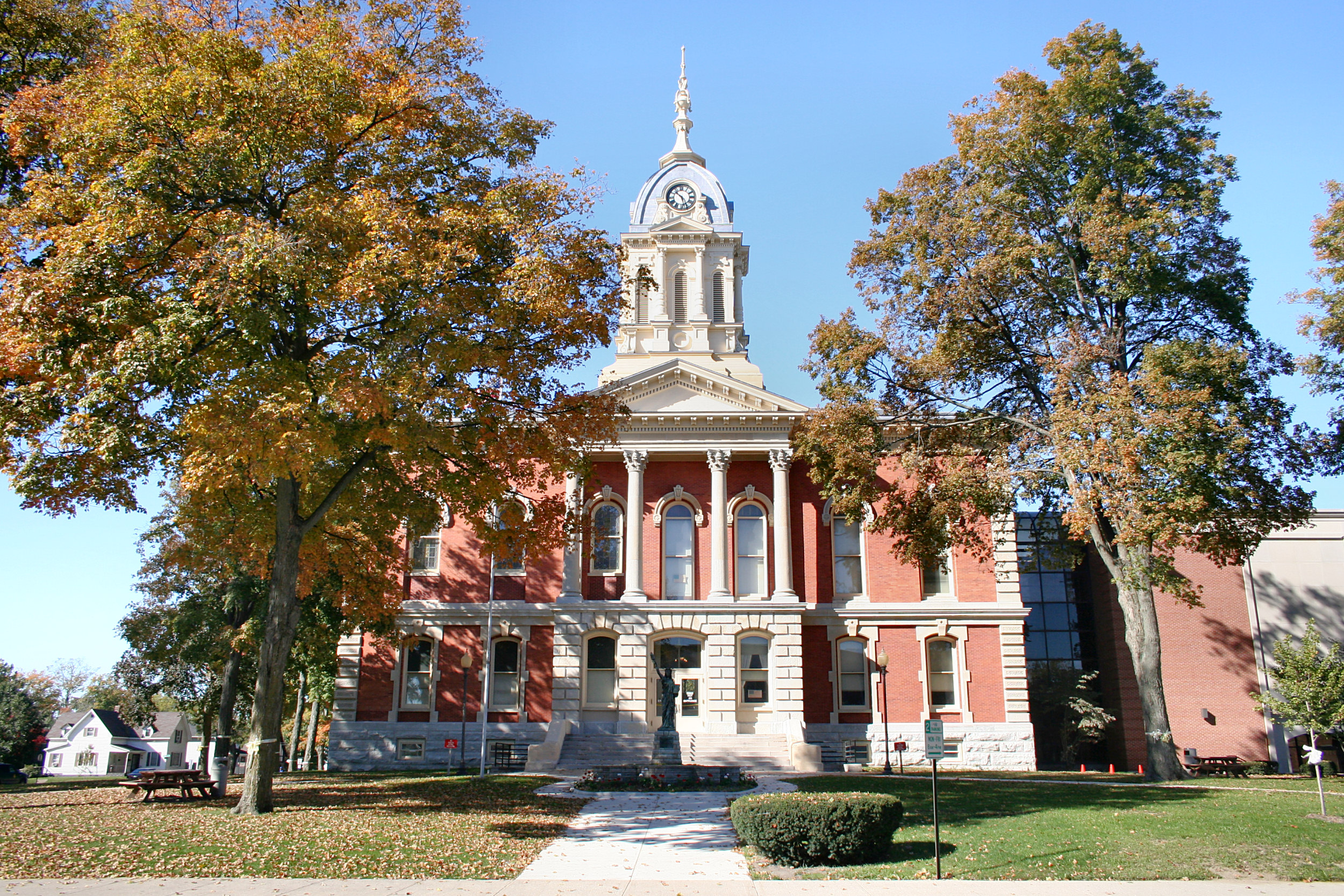
- Marshall County Court House, October 2005

- Location within Indiana Location within the United States
- Location: 117 W. Jefferson St., Plymouth, Indiana
- Coordinates: 41°20′37″N 86°18′40″W
- Area: 1.5 acres (0.61 ha)
- Built: 1870-1872
- Built by: Epperson and Favorite
- Architect: Gurdon P. Randall
- Architectural style: Renaissance, Italian Villa
- NRHP reference No.: 83000139
- Added to NRHP: June 30, 1983

Marshall County Courthouse is a historic courthouse located at Plymouth, Indiana. It was built between 1870 and 1872, and is a two-story, brick and limestone building in a combination of Italianate and Renaissance Revival styles. It is rectangular in form and has a hipped roof with central bell tower.

It was listed in the National Register of Historic Places in 1983. It is located in the Plymouth Northside Historic District.

== See also ==
- East Laporte Street Footbridge
- Plymouth Northside Historic District
- Plymouth Southside Historic District
