= Plymouth, Indiana =

- City
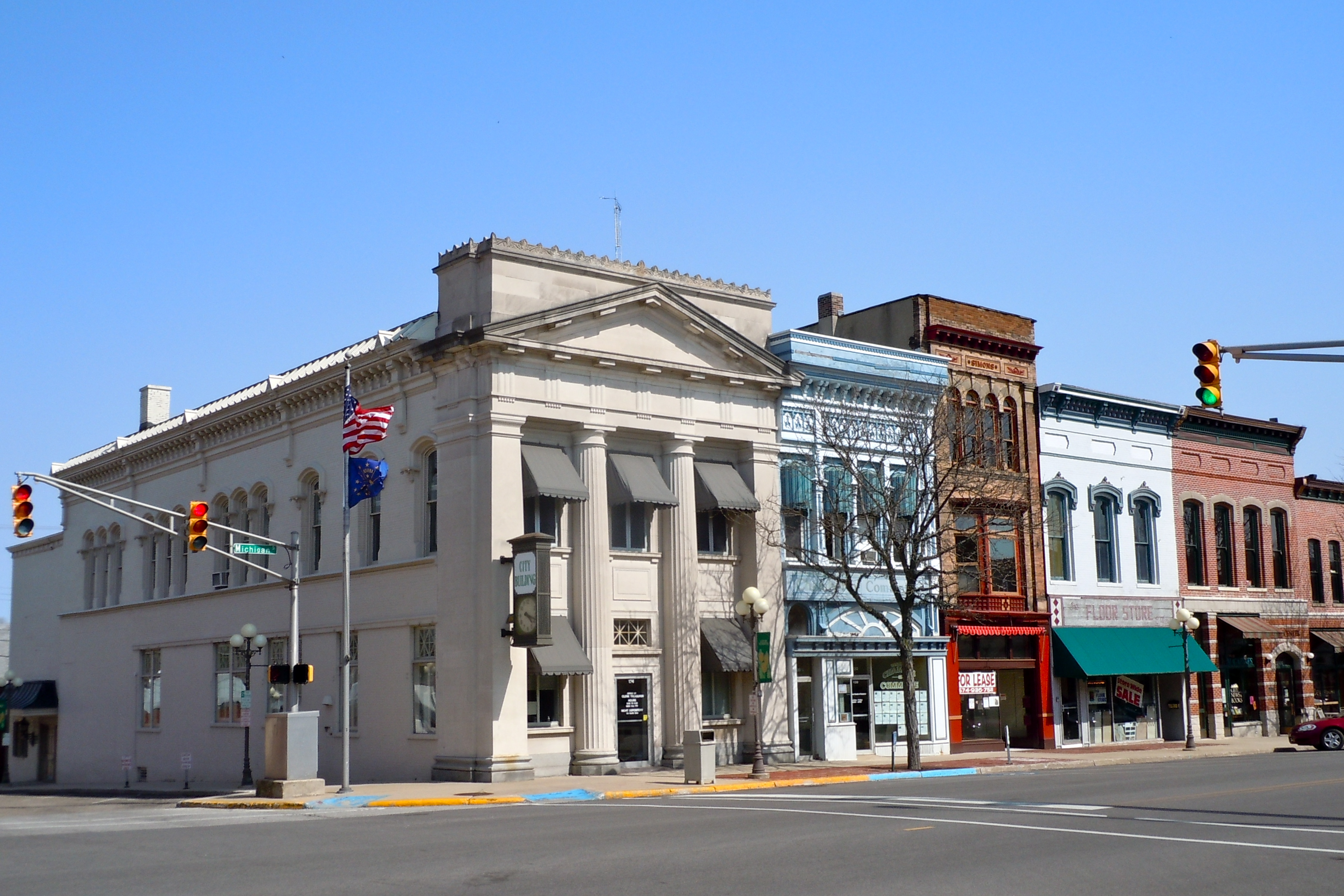
- Downtown Plymouth

- Flag Logo

- Location of Plymouth in Marshall County, Indiana.
- Coordinates: 41°20′38″N 86°18′45″W
- Country: United States
- State: Indiana
- County: Marshall

Government
  - Mayor: Robert Listenberger (D)

Area
  - Total: 7.62 sq mi (19.74 km^{2})
  - Land: 7.57 sq mi (19.61 km^{2})
  - Water: 0.050 sq mi (0.13 km^{2}) 0.53%
- Elevation: 797 ft (243 m)

Population (2020)
  - Total: 10,214
  - Density: 1,349.1/sq mi (520.88/km^{2})
- Time zone: UTC-5 (EST)
  - Summer (DST): UTC-4 (EDT)
- ZIP code: 46563
- Area code: 574
- FIPS code: 18-60822
- GNIS feature ID: 0441379
- Website: plymouthin.com

Plymouth is a city in and the county seat of Marshall County, Indiana, United States. The population is 15,124 in the 2020 census. Plymouth was the site of the first retail outlet of defunct U.S. retailer Montgomery Ward in 1926.

== History ==
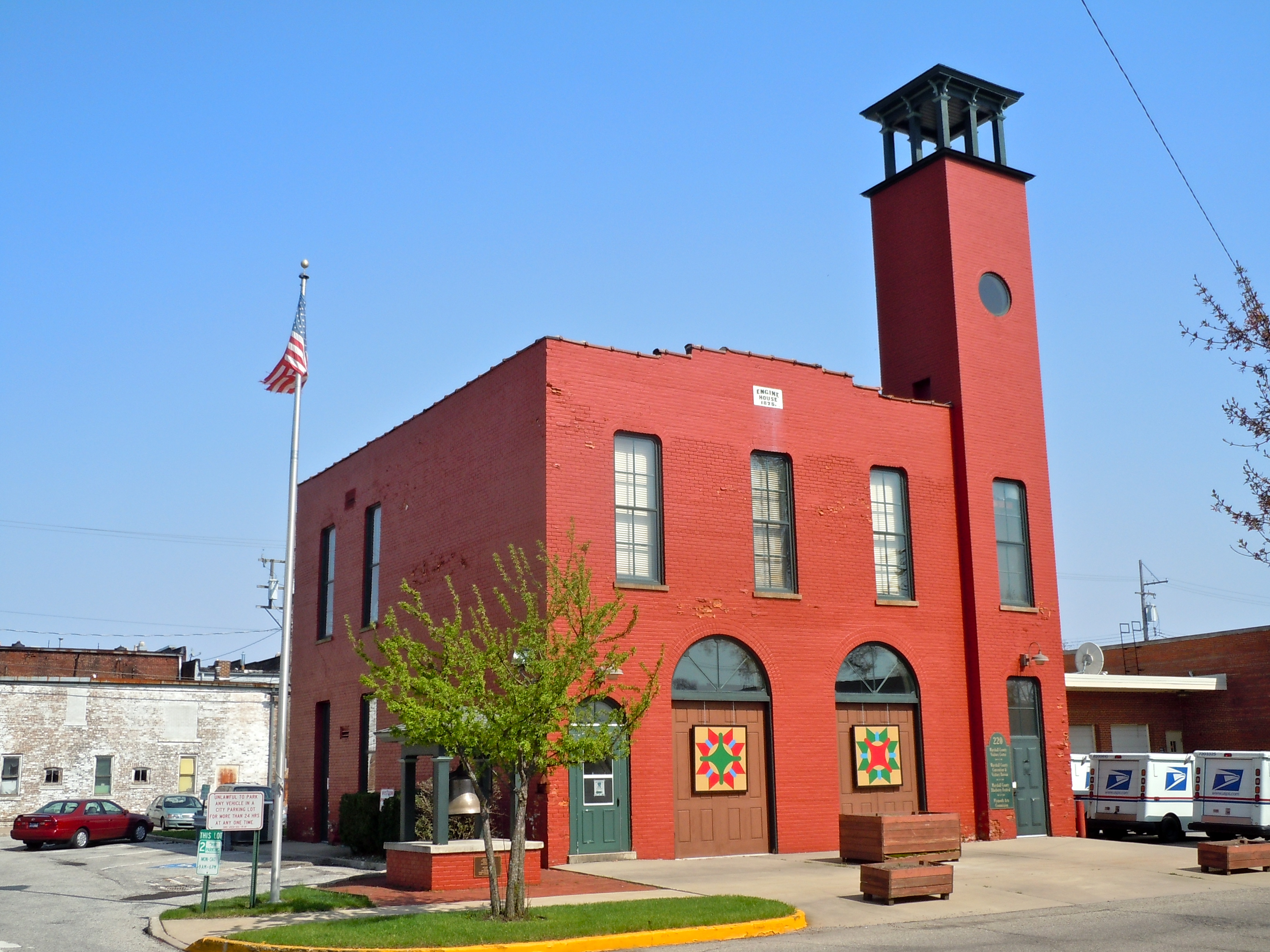
Historic fire station with patchwork quilt designs on doors

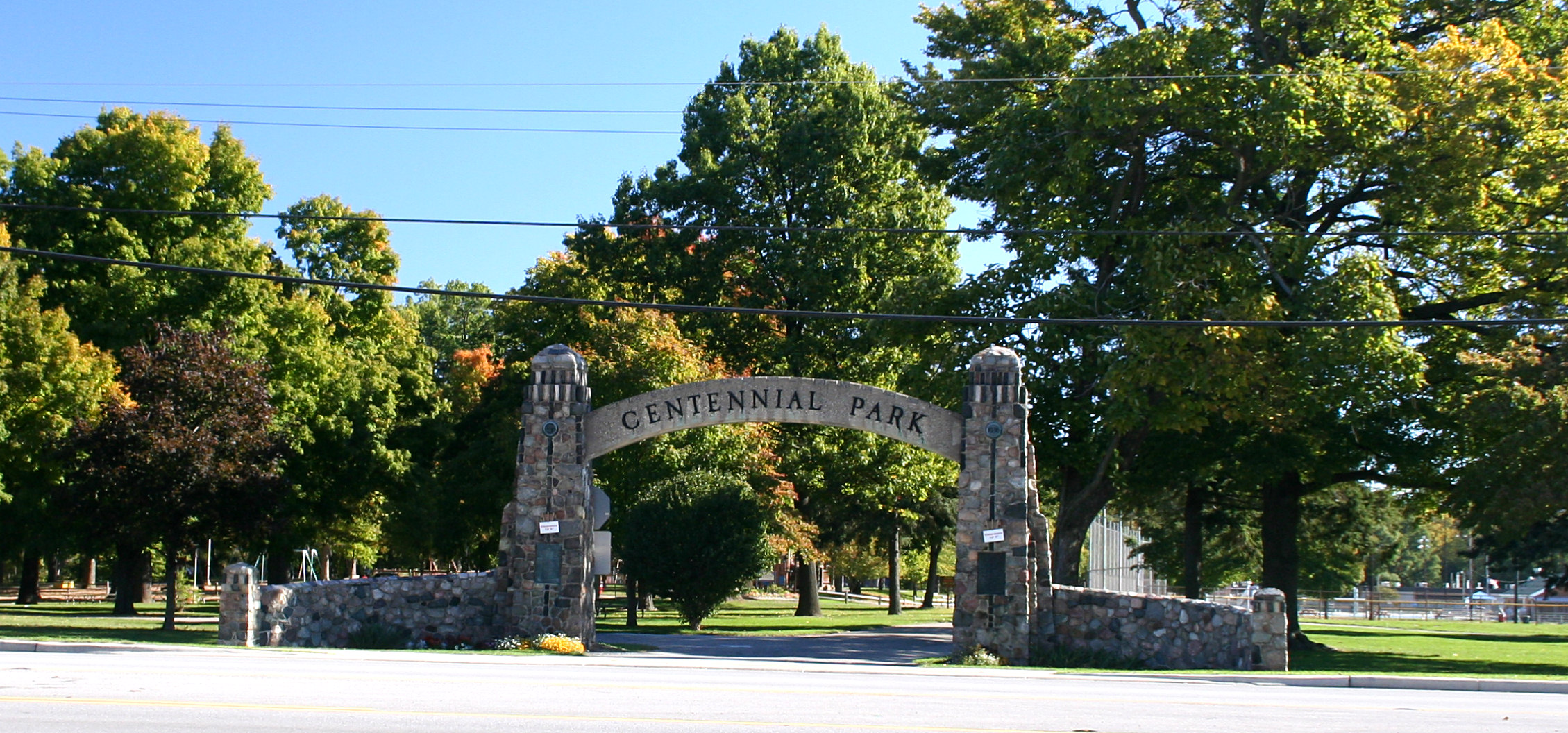
Centennial Park on N. Michigan Street (SR 17)

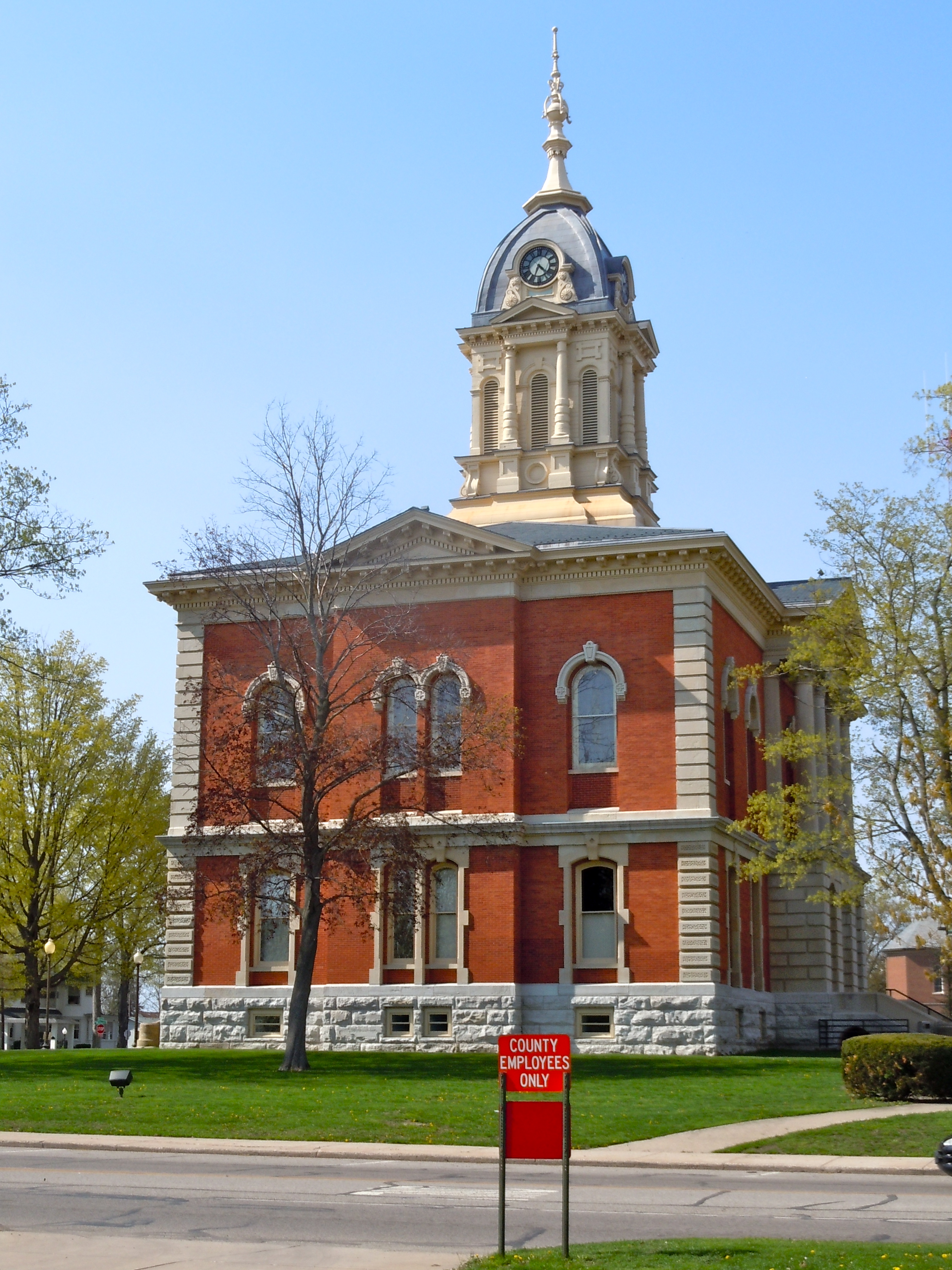
Marshall County courthouse

=== Early history ===
This area was part of the territory of the Potawatomi Native Americans, one of the historical tribes encountered by American settlers. In the nineteenth century, the United States government made numerous treaties to buy and extinguish Native American claims to land in the former Northwest Territory and the Southeast.

=== First settlements ===
Marshall County was formed in 1836, during the early years of settlement and before the forced removal of the Potawatomi people in 1838. It was named for U.S. Chief Justice John Marshall, who died in 1835. Marshall County is notable as the starting point in 1838 of the Potawatomi Trail of Death, which was the forced removal by United States forces of Chief Menominee and 859 Potawatomi Indians from Indiana to Indian Territory, at the site of present-day Osawatomie, Kansas, a distance of 660 miles (1,060 km). The first settlers arrived in what is now Marshall County in 1835. They arrived as a result of the end of the Black Hawk War as well as the completion of the Erie Canal. They consisted primarily of settlers from New England, "Yankees" descended from the English Puritans who settled New England in the colonial era. They were mainly members of the Congregational church, although due to the Second Great Awakening many of them had converted to Methodism and some had become Baptists before coming to what is now Marshall County. As a result of this heritage, some place names in Marshall County are named after places in New England, such as Plymouth, which is named after Plymouth, Massachusetts, the site where the Mayflower landed in 1620.

Plymouth, located near the center of Marshall County, was established on both banks of the Yellow River, a stream flowing from northeast to southwest across the county. In 1836, a dam and sawmill were constructed on the river. Many of the original settlers were immigrants from Germany, and mostly practiced farming. Upon their arrival, the land was covered with dense forests and marshlands, which required clearing and drainage before it could be cultivated. Early crops grown in Marshall County included corn, wheat, oats, rye, and beans.

The Indian Removal Act of 1830 authorized the forcible removal of Native American tribes from this area. In 1832, the United States government acquired the land through the Treaty of Tippecanoe.

Plymouth became the county seat of Marshall County in 1836 and established its first post office in 1837. The town was officially incorporated in 1851, and by 1900, its population had grown to 3,656, making it the largest town in the county.

==== Potawatomi relocation ====
Although many Potawatomi had relocated to Indian Territory in present-day Kansas, Chief Menominee and his band of the Yellow River refused to go. Militia under the authority of United States Army officers rounded them up and in September 1838, the band of 859 headed west, in what became known as the Potawatomi Trail of Death. They traveled more than 660 miles to Osawatomie, Kansas, with many of the Potawatomi walking. More than 40 of the tribal members died on the march.

==== American Civil War ====
During the Civil War, Union Army soldiers arrested Daniel E. VanValkenburgh, editor of the Plymouth Weekly Democrat, who criticized what he viewed as Lincoln's abuses of power. VanValkenburgh also criticized Department of Ohio commander Ambrose Burnside's lieutenant, General Milo S. Hascall. Hascall was in charge of the District of Indiana. VanValkenburgh called Hascall a donkey in the pages of the Democrat. Hascall promptly dispatched soldiers to arrest VanValkenburgh and brought him before Burnside to answer charges of violating Burnside's General Order No. 38. Burnside let VanValkenburgh off with a warning. The Democrat became the first of eleven Democratic newspapers suppressed or threatened with suppression in May 1863.

=== Later history ===
Main St in Plymouth, Indiana in 1933

On July 6, 1915, the Liberty Bell stopped in Plymouth on its trip from Philadelphia to the Exposition at San Francisco.

Much of Plymouth's history was documented in two major newspapers during the 19th century. The Marshall County Republican (also titled Plymouth Republican and Plymouth Tribune) operated from 1856 to 1922. Its main rival the Marshall County Democrat (also titled Plymouth Democrat) appeared from 1855 to 1932 (and as a weekly only edition until January 1, 1941). The Plymouth Daily Pilot acquired the Republican in 1922, and the Democrat became the Plymouth Daily News in 1932. The News and Pilot merged to become the Plymouth Pilot-News in 1947.

As part of Plymouth's sesquicentennial celebration in 1966, organizers created the first Marshall County Blueberry Festival, to take place over Labor Day weekend. This tradition has continued annually, and the Festival typically brings in tens of thousands of visitors over the four-day event.

In July 1982, five firefighters were killed when their fire truck overturned while responding to a call. The tanker truck crashed on a curve near West School on state road 17.

In March 2024, a semi-truck crashed into a Hacienda Mexican Restaurants from US-30.

The East Laporte Street Footbridge, Heminger Travel Lodge, Marshall County Courthouse, Plymouth Downtown Historic District, Plymouth Northside Historic District, Plymouth Southside Historic District, and Plymouth Fire Station are listed on the National Register of Historic Places.

== Geography ==
Plymouth, Indiana is located at 41°20′38″N 86°18′45″W (41.343894, -86.312544), along the Yellow River.

According to the 2010 census, Plymouth has a total area of 7.57 square miles (19.61 km^{2}), of which 7.53 square miles (19.50 km^{2}) (or 99.47%) is land and 0.04 square mile (0.1 km^{2}) (or 0.53%) is water.

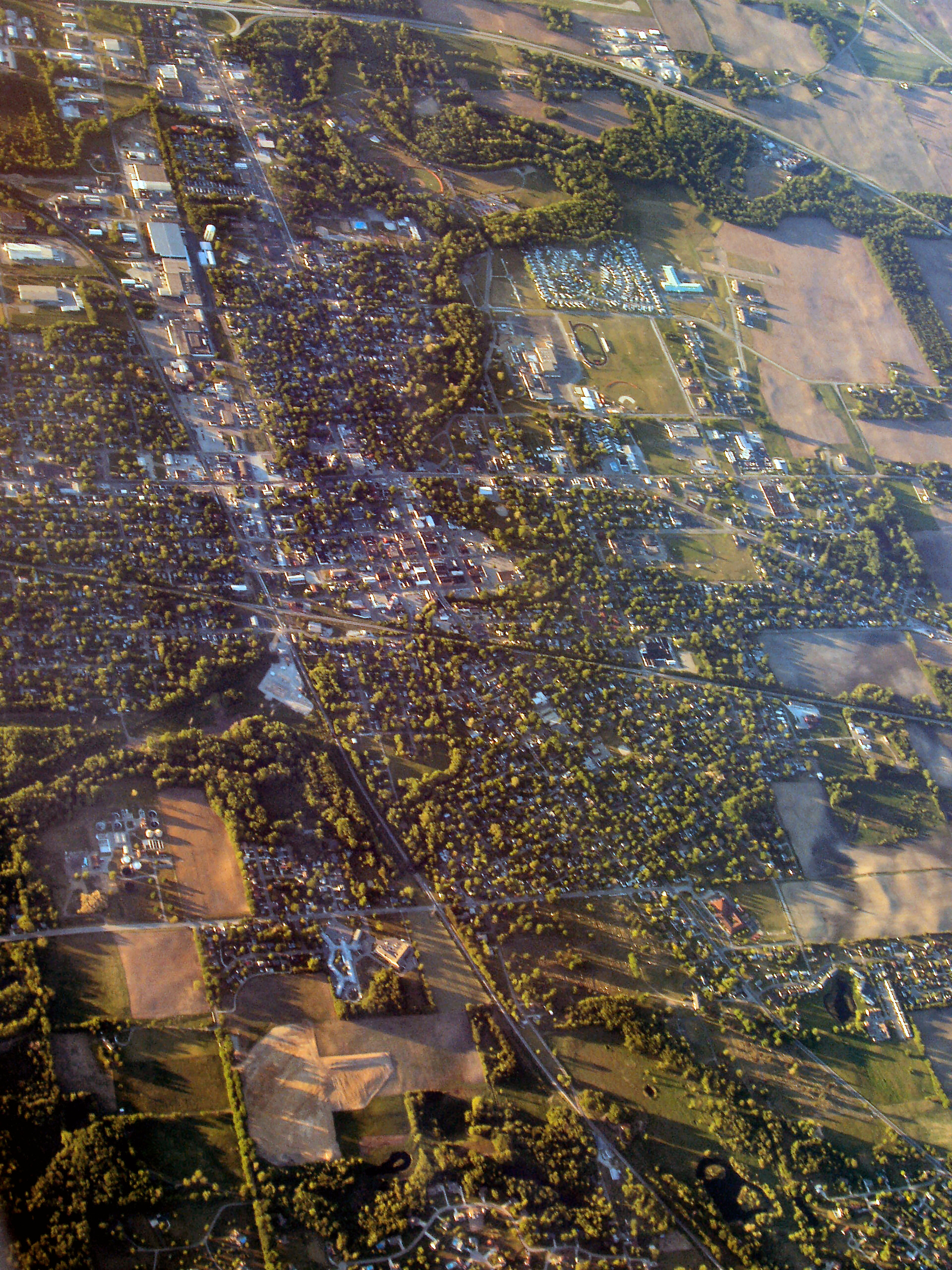
Plymouth downtown from above

=== Climate ===
Climate data for Plymouth, Indiana (1991–2020 normals, extremes 1894–present)
| Month | Jan | Feb | Mar | Apr | May | Jun | Jul | Aug | Sep | Oct | Nov | Dec | Year |
|---|---|---|---|---|---|---|---|---|---|---|---|---|---|
| Record high °F (°C) | 69 (21) | 74 (23) | 87 (31) | 90 (32) | 97 (36) | 105 (41) | 109 (43) | 103 (39) | 102 (39) | 93 (34) | 82 (28) | 71 (22) | 109 (43) |
| Mean maximum °F (°C) | 53.7 (12.1) | 56.8 (13.8) | 70.4 (21.3) | 80.3 (26.8) | 88.1 (31.2) | 93.0 (33.9) | 93.5 (34.2) | 91.8 (33.2) | 89.6 (32.0) | 82.1 (27.8) | 68.1 (20.1) | 56.3 (13.5) | 94.9 (34.9) |
| Mean daily maximum °F (°C) | 31.4 (−0.3) | 35.4 (1.9) | 47.1 (8.4) | 59.8 (15.4) | 71.2 (21.8) | 80.6 (27.0) | 83.8 (28.8) | 81.9 (27.7) | 76.1 (24.5) | 63.3 (17.4) | 48.4 (9.1) | 36.7 (2.6) | 59.6 (15.3) |
| Daily mean °F (°C) | 24.1 (−4.4) | 26.9 (−2.8) | 37.4 (3.0) | 48.9 (9.4) | 60.3 (15.7) | 70.0 (21.1) | 73.2 (22.9) | 71.5 (21.9) | 64.8 (18.2) | 52.8 (11.6) | 40.1 (4.5) | 29.8 (−1.2) | 50.0 (10.0) |
| Mean daily minimum °F (°C) | 16.7 (−8.5) | 18.5 (−7.5) | 27.7 (−2.4) | 38.0 (3.3) | 49.4 (9.7) | 59.3 (15.2) | 62.7 (17.1) | 61.0 (16.1) | 53.5 (11.9) | 42.4 (5.8) | 31.8 (−0.1) | 23.0 (−5.0) | 40.3 (4.6) |
| Mean minimum °F (°C) | −5.6 (−20.9) | −0.6 (−18.1) | 10.4 (−12.0) | 23.0 (−5.0) | 33.5 (0.8) | 44.3 (6.8) | 50.2 (10.1) | 49.8 (9.9) | 39.0 (3.9) | 28.8 (−1.8) | 17.6 (−8.0) | 3.8 (−15.7) | −9.0 (−22.8) |
| Record low °F (°C) | −22 (−30) | −20 (−29) | −6 (−21) | 16 (−9) | 26 (−3) | 36 (2) | 42 (6) | 42 (6) | 30 (−1) | 25 (−4) | 6 (−14) | −17 (−27) | −22 (−30) |
| Average precipitation inches (mm) | 2.63 (67) | 2.33 (59) | 2.45 (62) | 3.63 (92) | 4.33 (110) | 4.24 (108) | 4.39 (112) | 4.05 (103) | 3.20 (81) | 3.38 (86) | 3.03 (77) | 2.60 (66) | 40.26 (1,023) |
| Average snowfall inches (cm) | 18.6 (47) | 14.1 (36) | 6.4 (16) | 1.1 (2.8) | 0.0 (0.0) | 0.0 (0.0) | 0.0 (0.0) | 0.0 (0.0) | 0.0 (0.0) | 0.1 (0.25) | 3.3 (8.4) | 11.3 (29) | 54.9 (139) |
| Average extreme snow depth inches (cm) | 7.8 (20) | 7.5 (19) | 3.7 (9.4) | 0.5 (1.3) | 0.0 (0.0) | 0.0 (0.0) | 0.0 (0.0) | 0.0 (0.0) | 0.0 (0.0) | 0.0 (0.0) | 1.6 (4.1) | 4.4 (11) | 10.7 (27) |
| Average precipitation days (≥ 0.01 in) | 13.5 | 10.4 | 11.4 | 12.4 | 12.8 | 11.1 | 9.6 | 9.8 | 9.2 | 10.7 | 11.7 | 12.7 | 135.3 |
| Average snowy days (≥ 0.1 in) | 8.9 | 7.1 | 3.6 | 1.1 | 0.0 | 0.0 | 0.0 | 0.0 | 0.0 | 0.1 | 2.2 | 6.5 | 29.5 |
Source: NOAA

== Demographics ==
Historical population
| Census | Pop. | Note | %± |
|---|---|---|---|
| 1860 | 1,277 | | — |
| 1870 | 2,482 | | 94.4% |
| 1880 | 2,570 | | 3.5% |
| 1890 | 2,728 | | 6.1% |
| 1900 | 3,656 | | 34.0% |
| 1910 | 3,838 | | 5.0% |
| 1920 | 4,338 | | 13.0% |
| 1930 | 5,290 | | 21.9% |
| 1940 | 5,713 | | 8.0% |
| 1950 | 6,704 | | 17.3% |
| 1960 | 7,558 | | 12.7% |
| 1970 | 7,661 | | 1.4% |
| 1980 | 7,693 | | 0.4% |
| 1990 | 8,303 | | 7.9% |
| 2000 | 9,840 | | 18.5% |
| 2010 | 10,033 | | 2.0% |
| 2020 | 10,214 | | 1.8% |
U.S. Decennial Census

=== 2020 census ===
As of the 2020 census, Plymouth had a population of 10,214. The median age was 36.1 years. 26.0% of residents were under the age of 18 and 17.7% of residents were 65 years of age or older. For every 100 females there were 93.3 males, and for every 100 females age 18 and over there were 89.3 males age 18 and over.

100.0% of residents lived in urban areas, while 0.0% lived in rural areas.

There were 4,041 households in Plymouth, of which 31.6% had children under the age of 18 living in them. Of all households, 36.8% were married-couple households, 20.7% were households with a male householder and no spouse or partner present, and 34.3% were households with a female householder and no spouse or partner present. About 36.2% of all households were made up of individuals and 17.1% had someone living alone who was 65 years of age or older.

There were 4,398 housing units, of which 8.1% were vacant. The homeowner vacancy rate was 3.1% and the rental vacancy rate was 6.9%.

Racial composition as of the 2020 census
| Race | Number | Percent |
|---|---|---|
| White | 7,793 | 76.3% |
| Black or African American | 102 | 1.0% |
| American Indian and Alaska Native | 77 | 0.8% |
| Asian | 88 | 0.9% |
| Native Hawaiian and Other Pacific Islander | 2 | 0.0% |
| Some other race | 1,200 | 11.7% |
| Two or more races | 952 | 9.3% |
| Hispanic or Latino (of any race) | 2,632 | 25.8% |

=== 2010 census ===
As of the census of 2010, there were 10,033 people, 3,940 households, and 2,401 families residing in the city. The population density was 1,332.4 inhabitants per square mile (514.4/km^{2}). There were 4,451 housing units at an average density of 591.1 per square mile (228.2/km^{2}). The racial makeup of the city was 87.2% White, 0.9% African American, 0.6% Native American, 0.5% Asian, 8.3% from other races, and 2.5% from two or more races. Hispanic or Latino of any race were 20.0% of the population.

There were 3,940 households, of which 34.6% had children under the age of 18 living with them, 39.7% were married couples living together, 14.9% had a female householder with no husband present, 6.3% had a male householder with no wife present, and 39.1% were non-families. 33.5% of all households were made up of individuals, and 15% had someone living alone who was 65 years of age or older. The average household size was 2.49 and the average family size was 3.19.

The median age in the city was 34.3 years. 27.9% of residents were under the age of 18; 9.3% were between the ages of 18 and 24; 25.9% were from 25 to 44; 21.9% were from 45 to 64; and 15.2% were 65 years of age or older. The gender makeup of the city was 47.9% male and 52.1% female.

=== 2000 census ===
As of the census of 2000, there were 9,840 people, 3,838 households, and 2,406 families residing in the city. The population density was 1,414.0 inhabitants per square mile (545.9/km^{2}). There were 4,100 housing units at an average density of 589.2 per square mile (227.5/km^{2}). The racial makeup of the city was 80.80% White, 0.63% African American, 0.45% Native American, 0.50% Asian, 6.19% from other races, and 1.43% from two or more races. Hispanic or Latino of any race were 14.99% of the population.

There were 3,838 households, out of which 31.9% had children under the age of 18 living with them, 45.3% were married couples living together, 12.2% had a female householder with no husband present, and 37.3% were non-families. 31.4% of all households were made up of individuals, and 14.4% had someone living alone who was 65 years of age or older. The average household size was 2.48 and the average family size was 3.11.

In the city, the population was spread out, with 26.1% under the age of 18, 12.4% from 18 to 24, 28.8% from 25 to 44, 18.0% from 45 to 64, and 14.8% who were 65 years of age or older. The median age was 32 years. For every 100 females, there were 93.5 males. For every 100 females age 18 and over, there were 89.5 males.

The median income for a household in the city was $34,505, and the median income for a family was $41,447. Males had a median income of $30,444 versus $21,293 for females. The per capita income for the city was $15,417. About 10.4% of families and 13.1% of the population were below the poverty line, including 15.9% of those under age 18 and 9.6% of those age 65 or over.

== Economy ==
As the center of commerce for Marshall County, Plymouth provides a large percentage of jobs in the manufacturing, retail, and service sectors. Major manufacturing employers include Hoosier Racing Tire, Zentis, Oasis Lifestyle, Pregis Innovative Packaging, Pretzels Inc. and the Maax Corporation. Eight U.S. manufacturing headquarters are located in Plymouth: Oasis Lifestyle, American Containers, Inc., Arrow Services, Inc., Indiana Tool & Manufacturing, Co. Inc (ITAMCO) U.S. Granules Corp., Wiers Manufacturing, Inc. and Zentis North America, LLC.

== Parks and recreation ==
Plymouth has nine parks within its park system. These parks include:

- Centennial Park
- Founder's Park
- Freedom Park (Packard's Woods)
- Gill Park
- Hand Park (Webster Recreation Center)
- Magnetic Park
- Poplar Street Park
- Price's Memorial Park
- River Park Square

Centennial Park is the largest park in Plymouth. It is equipped with a swimming pool, lighted baseball and softball diamonds, lighted basketball courts, lighted tennis courts, sand volleyball courts, shuffleboard, horseshoes, a skate park, and multiple playgrounds. The large wooden castle playground was built in 1993. Another smaller, metal playground with swings and a climbing wall is a part of the park as well. Centennial Park also includes a dog park and a 2.7-mile-long (4.3 km) Greenway Trail that connects several parks.

Freedom Park (Packard's Woods) has athletic facilities and offers an all-inclusive play center.

Magnetic Park contains a playground, a fishing pond, and a gazebo with a fountain as well as the Conservation Clubhouse, which is able to be rented out for events.

River Square Park has an amphitheater, tiered seating, a splash pad, and a building for both concessions and restroom facilities. It is home to Plymouth's Saturday Farmer's Market, the Yellow River Festival, the Latino Festival, and Mayor's Summer of Music on Friday's in July and August. The Farmer's Market takes place every Saturday morning from May to October.

== Arts and Culture ==
=== Festivals and events ===
==== Blueberry Festival ====
Every Labor Day weekend since 1966, the town hosts the Marshall County Blueberry Festival. The original festival was organized to celebrate Indiana's sesquicentennial. Due to the success of the first celebration, a board of directors was formed to organize an annual celebration. The board decided to name the festival after Marshall County's large contribution of blueberries to the state's total yield during that time.

During the festival, vendors are set up around Centennial Park. Rides and activities are also available for youth and adult participants. Activities include arm wrestling, corn hole, pickleball, shuffleboard, softball, and volleyball.

Several events take place over the course of the festival including an antique car show, a 5k/15K run, bicycle cruise, hot air balloon launches, the Labor Day parade, and a firework show. Live entertainment is also available at three different stages across the festival.

== Education ==
=== Library ===
The town has a lending library, the Plymouth Public Library. The library, located on North Center Street, has worked hard to be useful for all different groups and individuals. According to the Plymouth Public Library website, "The Library's broad purpose, based upon provisions in the Indiana Code, is fulfilling 'the educational informational, and recreational interests and needs of the public.'"

== Notable people ==
=== Military and politics ===
- Henry N. Couden, enlisted in the 6th Regiment, Ohio Volunteer Infantry as a rank of corporal when the American Civil War broke out in 1861. Couden lost his sight in 1863 due to being wounded in the Battle of Beaver Dam Lake. He also served as the 54th Chaplain of the United States House of Representatives from 1895 to 1921 and was the second blind, religious leader to hold this position.
- Florence Riddick Boys (1873–1963), journalist, suffragist, and state official, lived in Plymouth from 1904 to 1963.

=== Entertainers ===
- Clare Osborne Reed (1864–1954), Chicago music educator, was born in Plymouth.
- Raymond Walburn, born in Plymouth but moved to Oakland, California to pursue an acting career. He acted in films from 1916 to 1955.

=== Athletes and coaches ===
- Noble Kizer, played football at the University of Notre Dame under coach Knute Rockne from 1922 to 1924. Stood as Purdue University's head football coach from 1930 to 1936. Kizer was inducted into the Indiana Football Hall of Fame in 1977.
- Steve Yoder, born in Plymouth and graduated from Plymouth High School in 1958. Yoder went on the Illinois Wesleyan University where he pursued basketball and baseball. He began his coaching career prior to receiving his master's degree by coaching a junior high basketball team in Glen Ellyn, Illinois. Yoder became Plymouth High School's head basketball coach in 1967 and was named District One Coach of the Year after his final year at Plymouth in 1973. In 1975, after serving as Furman University's assistant coach, he returned to Indiana where he became Penn High School head coach. However, he became Ball State University's assistant coach the year after, and their head coach the next year. Yoder held the head coaching position at Ball State University from 1977 to 1982. He stood as head coach at the University of Wisconsin–Madison for the next ten years before he went to work for the Indiana Pacers and New York Knicks as a scout.
- Scott Skiles, graduated from Plymouth High School in 1982 then went on to play basketball for and graduate from Michigan State University in 1986. He has played for Milwaukee Bucks, Indiana Pacers, Orlando Magic, Washington Bullets, Philadelphia 76ers, and PAOK Thessaloniki (Greek basketball league). He coached for the Phoenix Suns, Chicago Bulls, Milwaukee Bucks, and Orlando Magic. His playing career lasted from 1986 to 1997; his coaching career began in 1997. On December 30, 1990, Skiles broke the single-game assist record while playing for the Orlando Magic. He had 30 assists vs. the Denver Nuggets and the record stands to this day.
- Morgan Uceny, born in Plymouth and graduated from Cornell University in 2007 as a four-time All-American. She won the National Title for the 1500m, which qualified her for the 2012 Olympics in London.

=== Other ===
- Zephen Allen Xaver, born in Plymouth and raised in neighboring Bremen, perpetrated the 2019 Sebring shooting in Sebring, Florida.

== See also ==
- List of sundown towns in the United States
