= National Register of Historic Places listings in Jackson County, Florida =

Location of Jackson County in Florida

This is a list of the National Register of Historic Places listings in Jackson County, Florida.

This is intended to be a complete list of the properties and districts on the National Register of Historic Places in Jackson County, Florida, United States. The locations of National Register properties and districts for which the latitude and longitude coordinates are included below, may be seen in a map.

There are 13 properties and districts listed on the National Register in the county.

This National Park Service list is complete through NPS recent listings posted March 21, 2025.

Contents: Counties in Florida (non-linked contain no National Register listings)
Alachua - Baker - Bay - Bradford - Brevard - Broward - Calhoun - Charlotte - Citrus - Clay - Collier - Columbia - DeSoto - Dixie - Duval - Escambia - Flagler - Franklin - Gadsden - Gilchrist - Glades - Gulf - Hamilton - Hardee - Hendry - Hernando - Highlands - Hillsborough (Tampa) - Holmes - Indian River - Jackson - Jefferson - Lafayette - Lake - Lee - Leon - Levy - Liberty - Madison - Manatee - Marion - Martin - Miami-Dade (Miami) - Monroe - Nassau - Okaloosa - Okeechobee - Orange - Osceola - Palm Beach - Pasco - Pinellas - Polk - Putnam - St. Johns - St. Lucie - Santa Rosa - Sarasota - Seminole - Sumter - Suwannee - Taylor - Union - Volusia - Wakulla - Walton - Washington

== Current listings ==
	Name on the Register	Image	Date listed	Location	City or town	Description
1	Bellamy Bridge		October 16, 2019 (#100004517)	4057 Bellamy Bridge Heritage Trail; 30°51′57″N 85°15′05″W	Marianna	
2	Ely-Criglar House	Ely-Criglar House	December 27, 1972 (#72000326)	242 West Lafayette Street; 30°46′34″N 85°14′05″W	Marianna	
3	Erwin House	Erwin House	June 5, 1974 (#74000642)	Fort Road east of State Road 71; 30°52′12″N 85°09′53″W	Greenwood	
4	Great Oaks	Great Oaks	December 5, 1972 (#72000325)	South of the junction of State Roads 69 and 71; 30°52′12″N 85°09′43″W	Greenwood	
5	Longwood House	Longwood House	October 11, 2017 (#100001735)	5124 Fort Rd. 30°52′12″N 85°10′04″W	Greenwood	
6	Marianna Historic District	Marianna Historic District	May 23, 1997 (#97000456)	Bounded by Davis, Park, Jackson, and Wynn Streets; 30°46′40″N 85°13′29″W	Marianna	Part of the Marianna MPS
7	Robert Lee Norton House	Robert Lee Norton House	August 22, 1996 (#96000914)	2045 Church Street; 30°42′49″N 85°04′25″W	Cypress	
8	Pender's Store	Pender's Store	May 3, 1974 (#74000643)	Near the junction of State Roads 69 and 71; 30°52′13″N 85°09′44″W	Greenwood	
9	Joseph W. Russ Jr. House	Joseph W. Russ Jr. House	July 18, 1983 (#83001425)	310 West Lafayette Street; 30°46′38″N 85°14′09″W	Marianna	
10	Sneads Community House and Old Pump	Sneads Community House and Old Pump	July 31, 2017 (#100001390)	8025 Old Spanish Trail; 30°42′29″N 84°55′31″W	Sneads	
11	St. Luke Baptist Church	St. Luke Baptist Church	February 12, 2003 (#03000008)	4476 East Jackson Street; 30°46′23″N 85°13′24″W	Marianna	
12	Waddells Mill Pond Site		December 15, 1972 (#72000327)	Address Restricted	Marianna	
13	Theophilus West House	Theophilus West House	December 26, 1972 (#72000328)	403 Putnam Street; 30°46′43″N 85°13′32″W	Marianna	

== See also ==
- List of National Historic Landmarks in Florida
- National Register of Historic Places listings in Florida
