= Tippecanoe =

Tippecanoe (/ˌtɪpəkəˈnuː/ TIP-ə-kə-NOO) may refer to several places or things in the United States:

- The 1811 Battle of Tippecanoe in Indiana
- A nickname for William Henry Harrison (U.S. President March 1841–April 1841) from his role in the battle
  - Tippecanoe and Tyler Too, an 1840 slogan and song based partly on this nickname
  - Curse of Tippecanoe, the pattern where each American president who won an election in a year ending in zero from 1840 to 1960 died in office
- Treaty of Tippecanoe, an 1832 agreement between the United States government and Native American tribes in Indiana

== Places ==
- Tippecanoe, Indiana, an unincorporated town
- Tippecanoe Place, mansion built in South Bend, Indiana, by Clement Studebaker
- Tippecanoe, Ohio, an unincorporated town
- Tippecanoe County, Indiana
- Tippecanoe River in Indiana
- Tippecanoe River State Park in Indiana
- Tippecanoe Township (disambiguation), five in Indiana and one in Iowa
- The original (but disputed) name for Tipp City, Ohio
  - Tippecanoe High School in Tipp City, Ohio
- Tippecanoe Lake, a glacially-created lake in Kosciusko County, Indiana
- Tippecanoe Battlefield Park, the location of the Battle of Tippecanoe fought on November 7, 1811

== Ships ==
- USS Tippecanoe, the name of several United States Navy ships
- USNS Tippecanoe (T-AO-199), a United States Navy fleet replenishment oiler in service since 1993

== Miscellaneous ==
- Tippecanoe Open, a golf tournament on the LPGA Tour from 1959 to 1961
- Tippecanoe School Corporation, administrator of 18 high schools, middle schools and elementary schools in Tippecanoe County, Indiana
- Tippecanoe County Courthouse, Lafayette, Indiana
- Tippecanoe (train), a passenger train operated by the Monon Railroad between Chicago and Indianapolis
- Tippecanoe station, a planned train station in San Bernardino, California
