= Erwin House =

Erwin House may refer to:

- Erwin House (Greenwood, Florida)
- Erwin House (Marshall County, Indiana)
- Erwin House (Allendale, South Carolina)
- Junius R. Ward House, also known as "Erwin House" (Erwin, Mississippi)
