= Tippecanoe Township, Indiana =

Tippecanoe Township, Indiana may refer to one of the following places:

- Tippecanoe Township, Carroll County, Indiana
- Tippecanoe Township, Kosciusko County, Indiana
- Tippecanoe Township, Marshall County, Indiana
- Tippecanoe Township, Pulaski County, Indiana
- Tippecanoe Township, Tippecanoe County, Indiana

See also

- Tippecanoe Township (disambiguation)
