= Tippecanoe, Indiana =

- Census-designated place
- Location within Indiana Location within the United States
- Coordinates: 41°12′32″N 86°06′54″W
- Country: United States
- State: Indiana
- County: Marshall
- Township: Tippecanoe
- Named for: Tippecanoe River

Area
  - Total: 0.61 sq mi (1.6 km^{2})
  - Land: 0.61 sq mi (1.6 km^{2})
  - Water: 0.0 sq mi (0 km^{2})
- Elevation: 781 ft (238 m)
- Time zone: UTC-5 (Eastern)
  - Summer (DST): UTC-4 (Eastern Daylight)
- ZIP code: 46570
- Area code: 574
- FIPS code: 18-75860
- GNIS feature ID: 449738

Tippecanoe (/ˌtɪpəkəˈnuː/ TIP-ə-kə-NOO) is an unincorporated community and census-designated place (CDP) in Tippecanoe Township, Marshall County, Indiana, United States.

== History ==
Tippecanoe was settled beginning in 1882. The original town was located 1 mile to the north and was platted as "Tippecanoe Town" in 1850, named for the Tippecanoe River on its southern edge. The name "Tippecanoe" was derived from a Miami-Illinois word for buffalo fish, reconstructed as */kiteepihkwana/ or as kiteepihkwana siipiiwi. After the railroad was built 1 mile south, the town was relocated. The original Tippecanoe Town was renamed Old Tip Town.

Benack's Village was located 1.4 miles (2.3 km) east-northeast of Tippecanoe, across the Tippecanoe River in what is now Potawatomi Wildlife Park.

== Geography ==
Tippecanoe is located in southeastern Marshall County at 41°12′32″N 86°06′54″W. It is named for the Tippecanoe River, which runs on the north side of town. Indiana State Road 331 passes through the town, leading north 6 miles (10 km) to Bourbon and southwest (via State Road 25) 13 miles (21 km) to Rochester.

According to the U.S. Census Bureau, the Tippecanoe CDP has an area of 0.61 square miles (1.58 km^{2}), all land. The Tippecanoe River flows southwest to the Wabash River north of Lafayette.

== Demographics ==
Historical population
Census	Pop.	Note	%±
2023 (est.)	383

The United States Census Bureau defined Tippecanoe as a census designated place in the 2022 American Community Survey.

== Education ==
- Triton School Corporation
- Argos Community Schools
- Tippecanoe Valley School Corporation

== Notable residents ==
- Donald V. Fites, former president & CEO of Caterpillar Inc.
- Robert "Bob" Newton, Founder of Hoosier Racing Tire

== Gallery ==
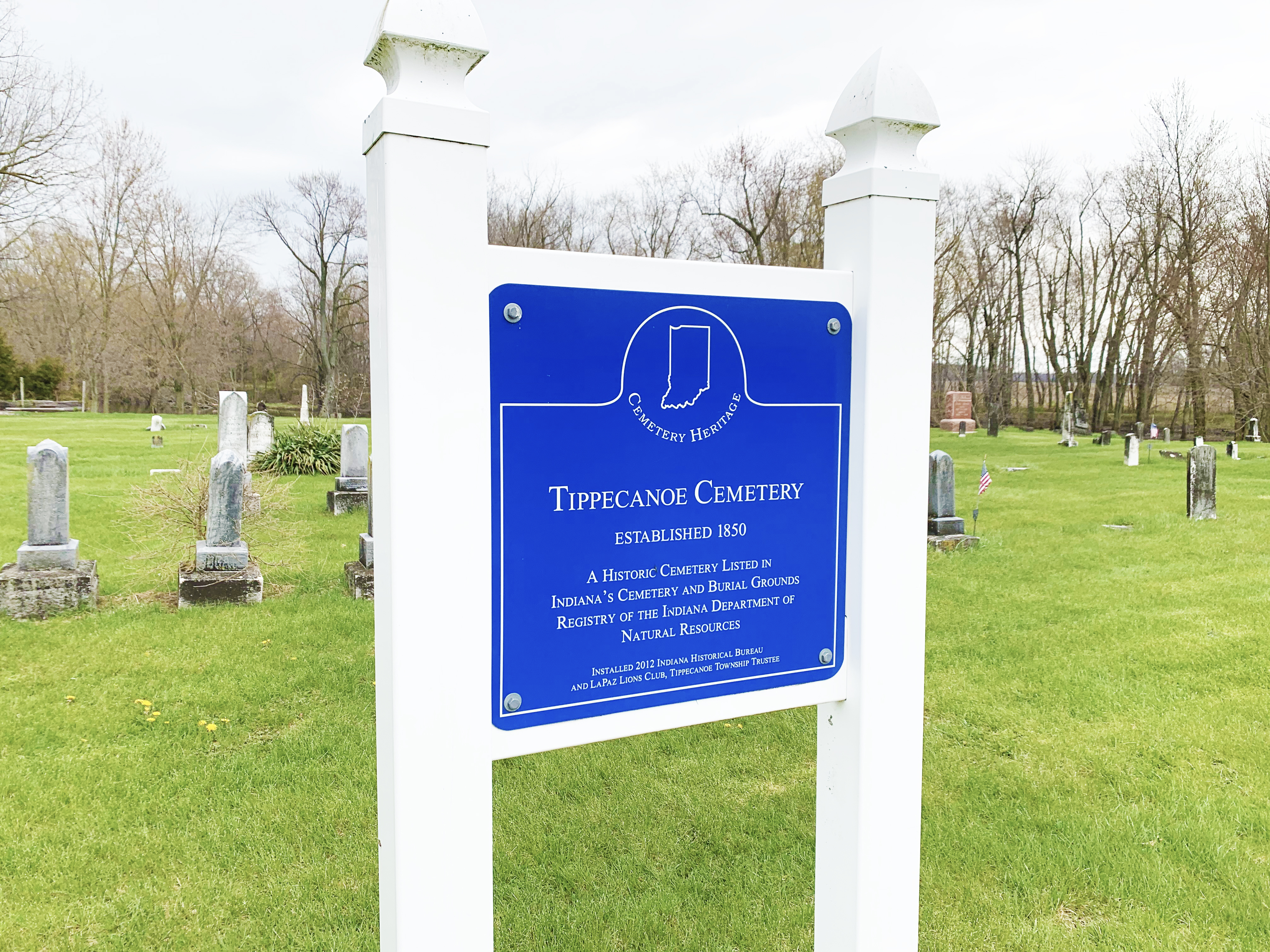
Cemetery Sign

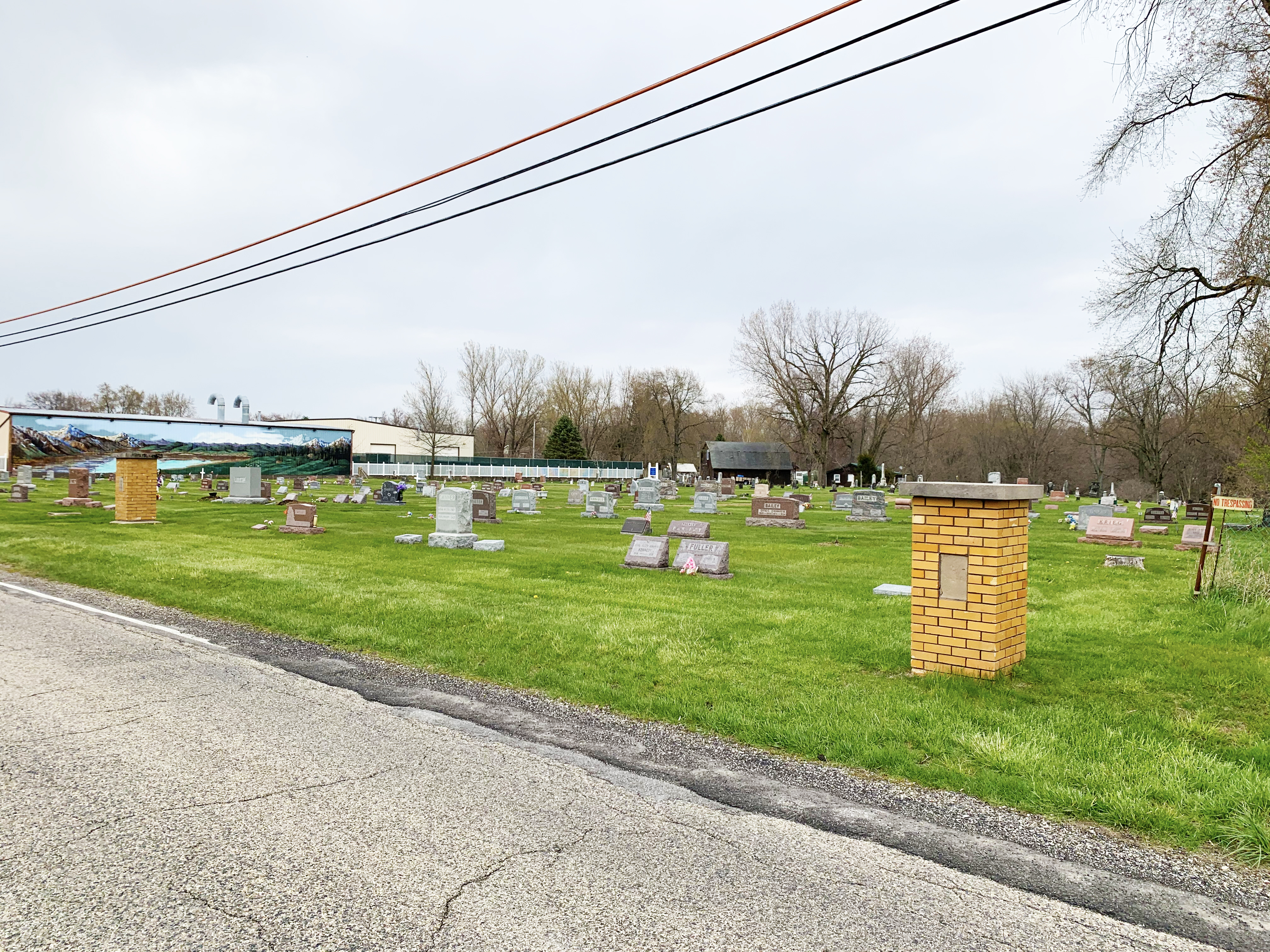
Original Tippecanoe Cemetery

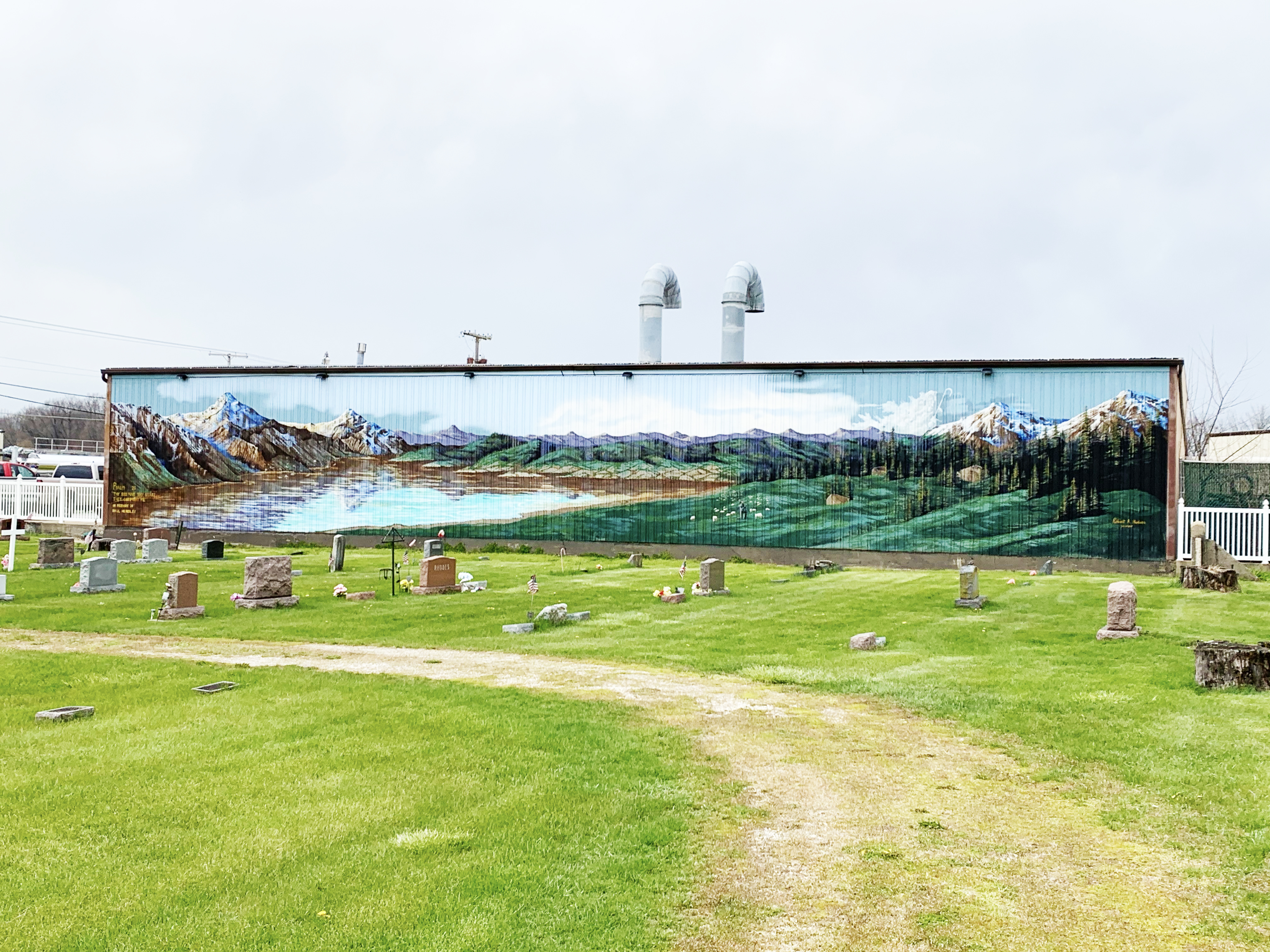
Mural commissioned by Paul Hensley in 2013
