= Great Oaks =

Great Oaks may refer to:

- Great Oaks Institute of Technology and Career Development
- Great Oaks (Greenwood, Florida), a historical site in Greenwood, Florida
- Great Oaks (Roswell, Georgia), historic house in Roswell Historic District
- Great Oaks Entertainment, a short-lived film production company
