= Pender's Store =

- U.S. National Register of Historic Places
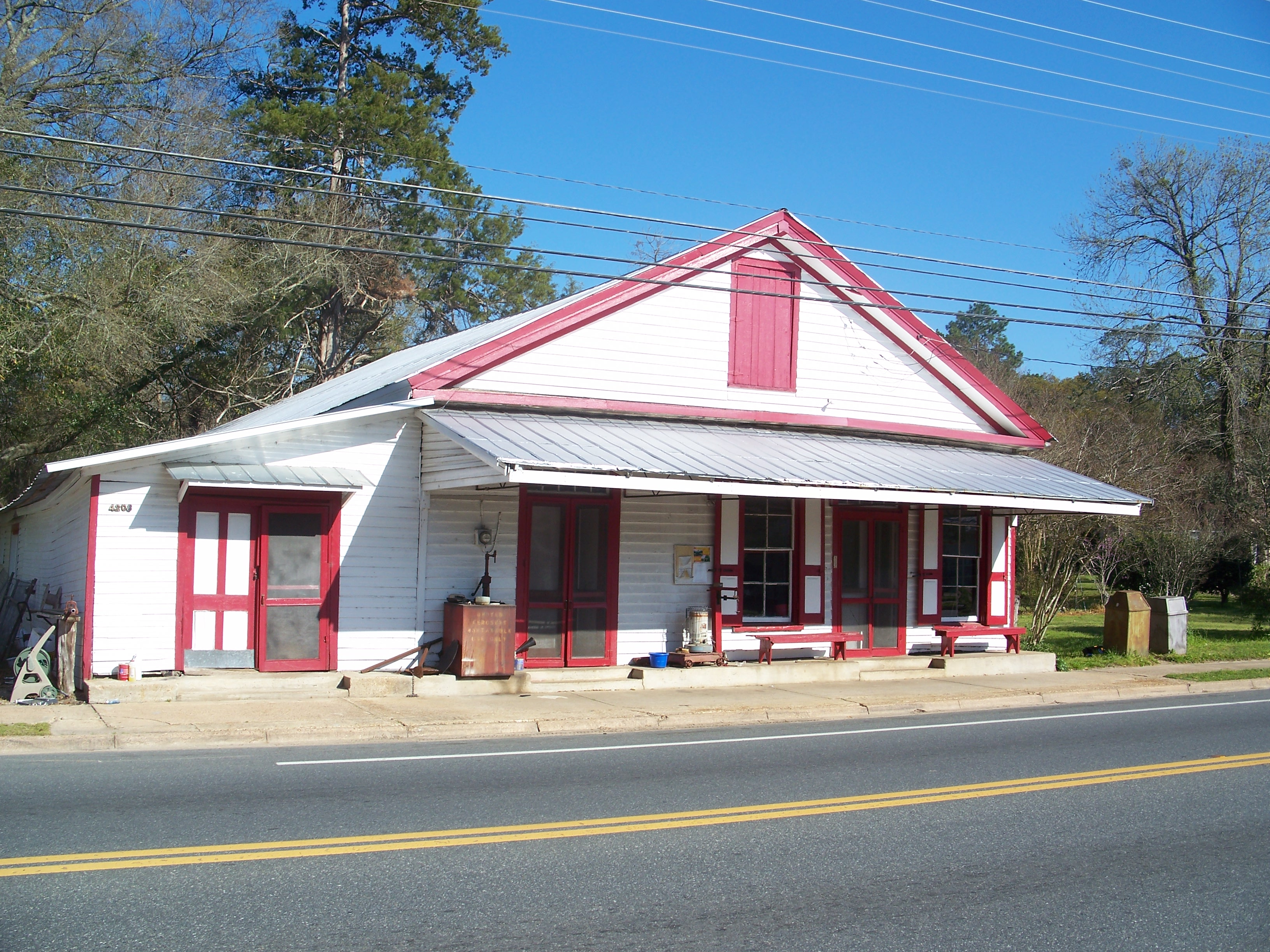

- Location within Florida Location within the United States
- Location: Greenwood, Florida
- Coordinates: 30°52′13″N 85°9′44″W
- Architectural style: Frame Vernacular
- NRHP reference No.: 74000643
- Added to NRHP: May 3, 1974

Pender's Store is a historic site in Greenwood, Florida. It is located near the junction of SR 69 and 71. On May 3, 1974, it was added to the U.S. National Register of Historic Places.
