= Donald V. Fites =

American businessman (born 1934)

Donald Vester Fites
- Born: 1934; Tippecanoe, Indiana
- Education: Valparaiso University 1956; MIT Sloan School of Management 1971
- Known for: Former Chairman and CEO of Caterpillar, Inc.
- Board member of: Carnegie Endowment for International Peace; Phi Kappa Psi Foundation

Donald Vester Fites (born 1934) was the chairman and CEO of Caterpillar, Inc. from 1990 to 1999.

== Early life ==
Don Fites was born in 1934 in Tippecanoe, Indiana. He attended Valparaiso University, where he joined Phi Kappa Psi. He graduated with a B.S. in Civil Engineering in 1956, and soon after joined Caterpillar.

He attended Valparaiso University in 1956. He then attended the MIT Sloan School of Management as a Sloan Fellow, and received his MBA in 1971.

== Career ==
He attained the position of vice president at Caterpillar in 1981, and then executive vice president in 1985. 1990 marked Don's elevation to the positions of chief executive officer and chairman of the board, which he held until he reached the mandatory retirement age in 1999.
