= Old Tip Town, Indiana =

- Unincorporated community
- Location within Indiana Location within the United States
- Coordinates: 41°13′25″N 86°06′55″W
- Country: United States
- State: Indiana
- County: Marshall
- Township: Tippecanoe
- Named after: Tippecanoe River
- Elevation: 781 ft (238 m)
- ZIP code: 46570
- Area code: 574
- FIPS code: 18-56412
- GNIS feature ID: 440605

Old Tip Town is an unincorporated community in Tippecanoe Township, Marshall County, Indiana.

== History ==
Old Tip Town was originally called Tippecanoe Town, and under the later name was platted in 1850.

== Geography ==
Old Tip Town is located on the Tippecanoe River. Potawatomi Wildlife Park is located approximately one mile northeast of town and is home to many species of wildlife, including geese, ducks, frogs, turtles, rabbits, gray squirrels and deer.

Old cemetery on south side of town.

== Notable residents ==
- Robert "Bob" Newton, founder of Hoosier Racing Tire

== Gallery ==
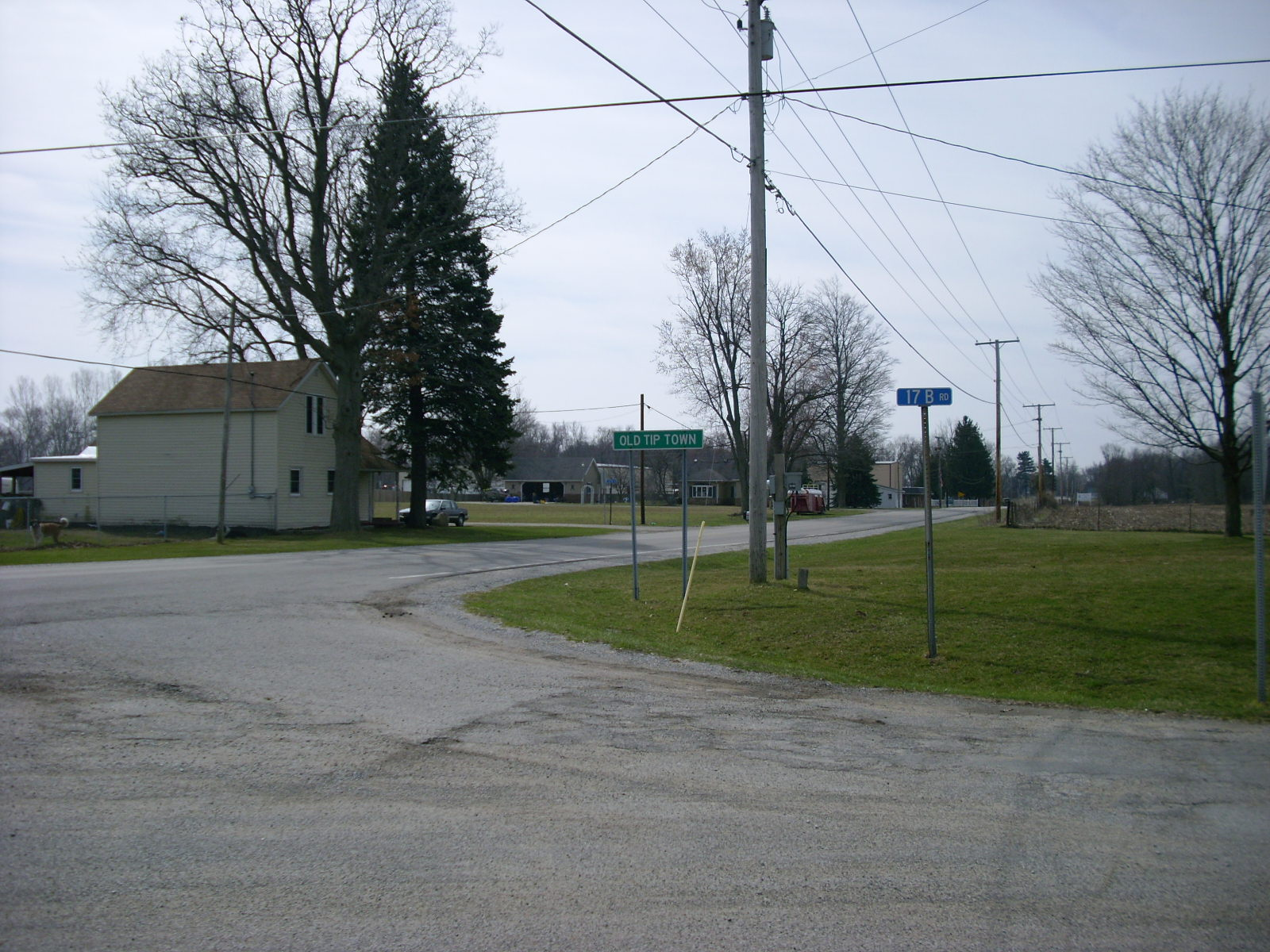
Looking south into town.

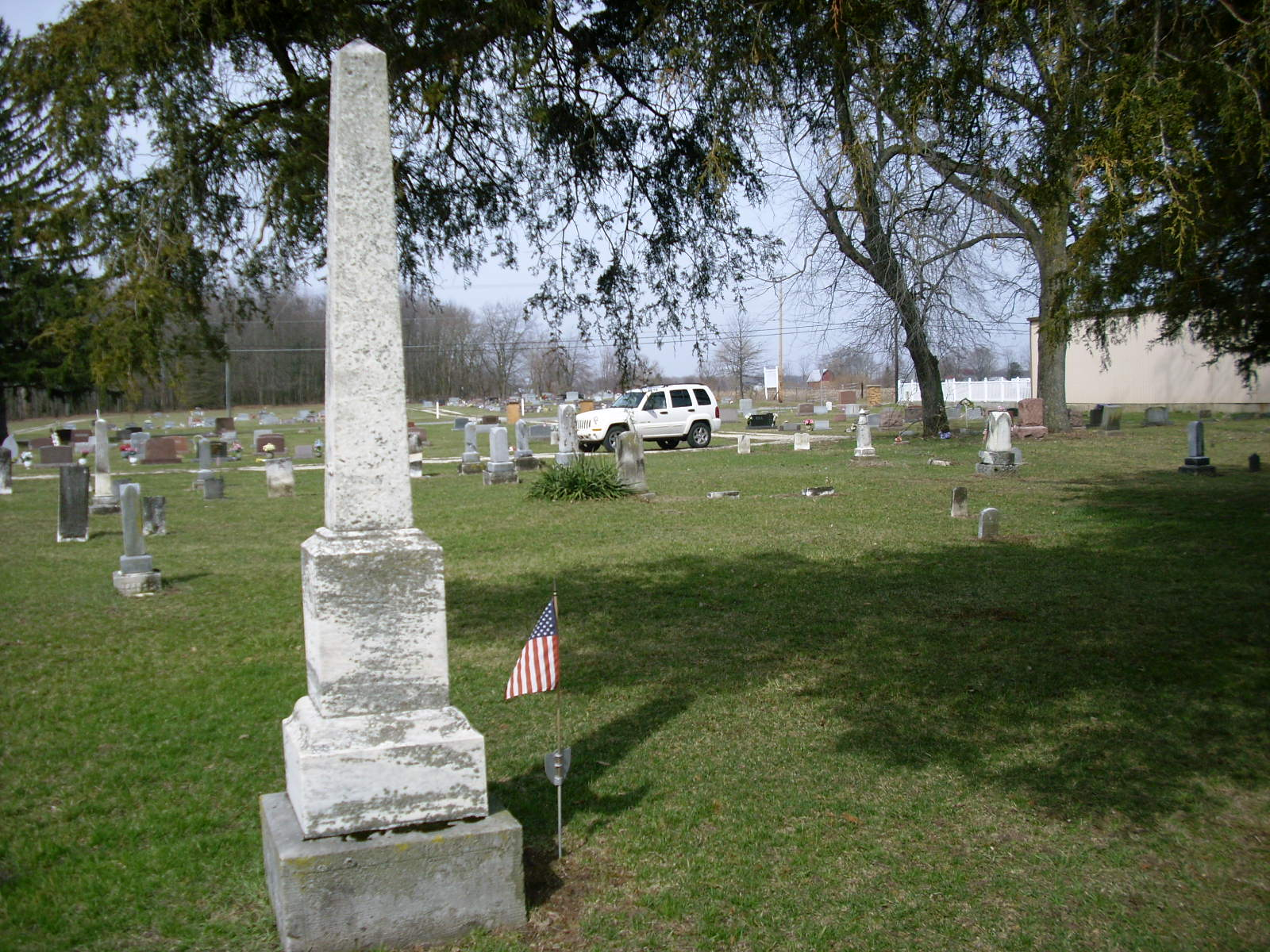
Old Tip Town Cemetery

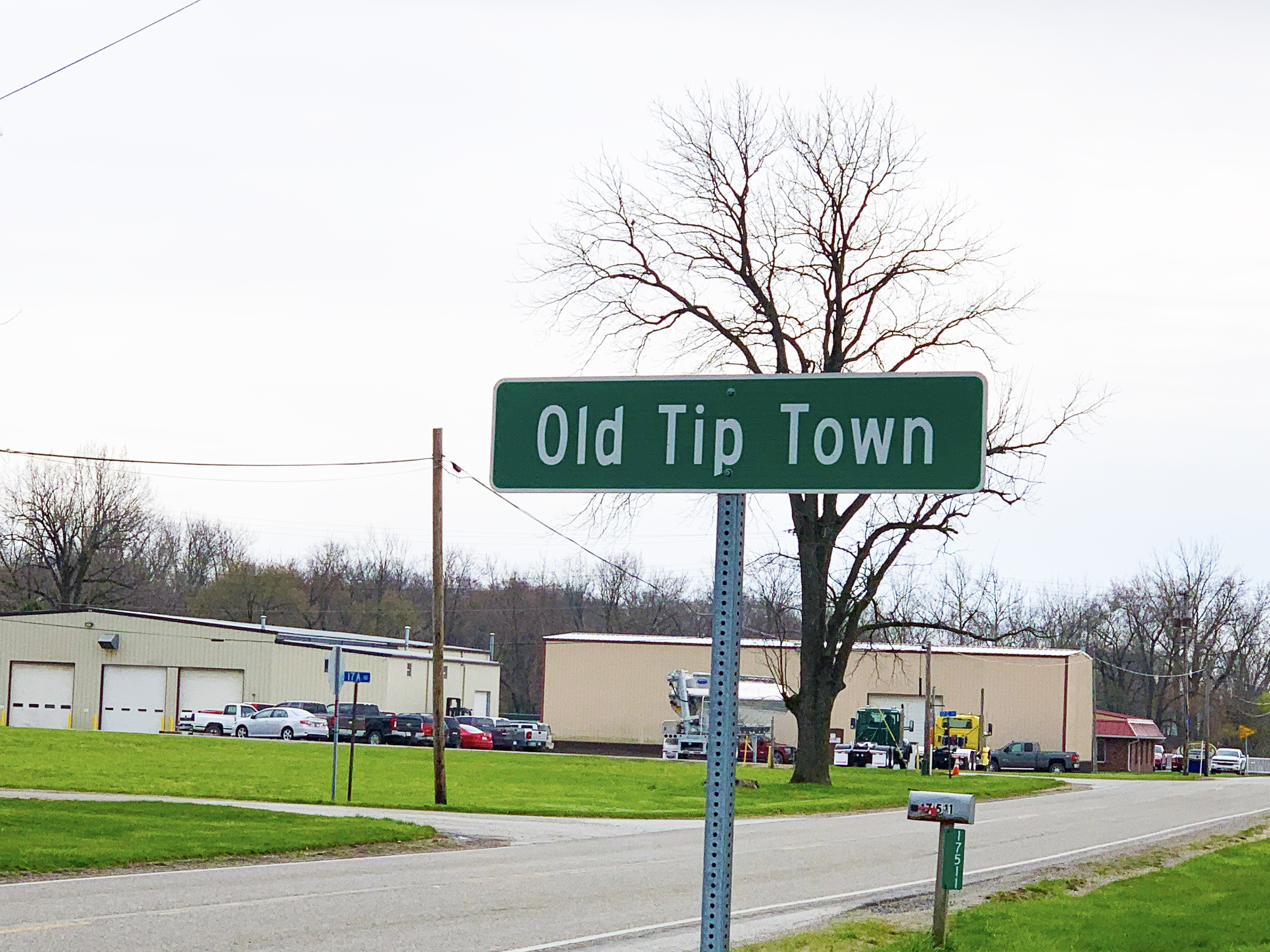
Old Tip Town Sign

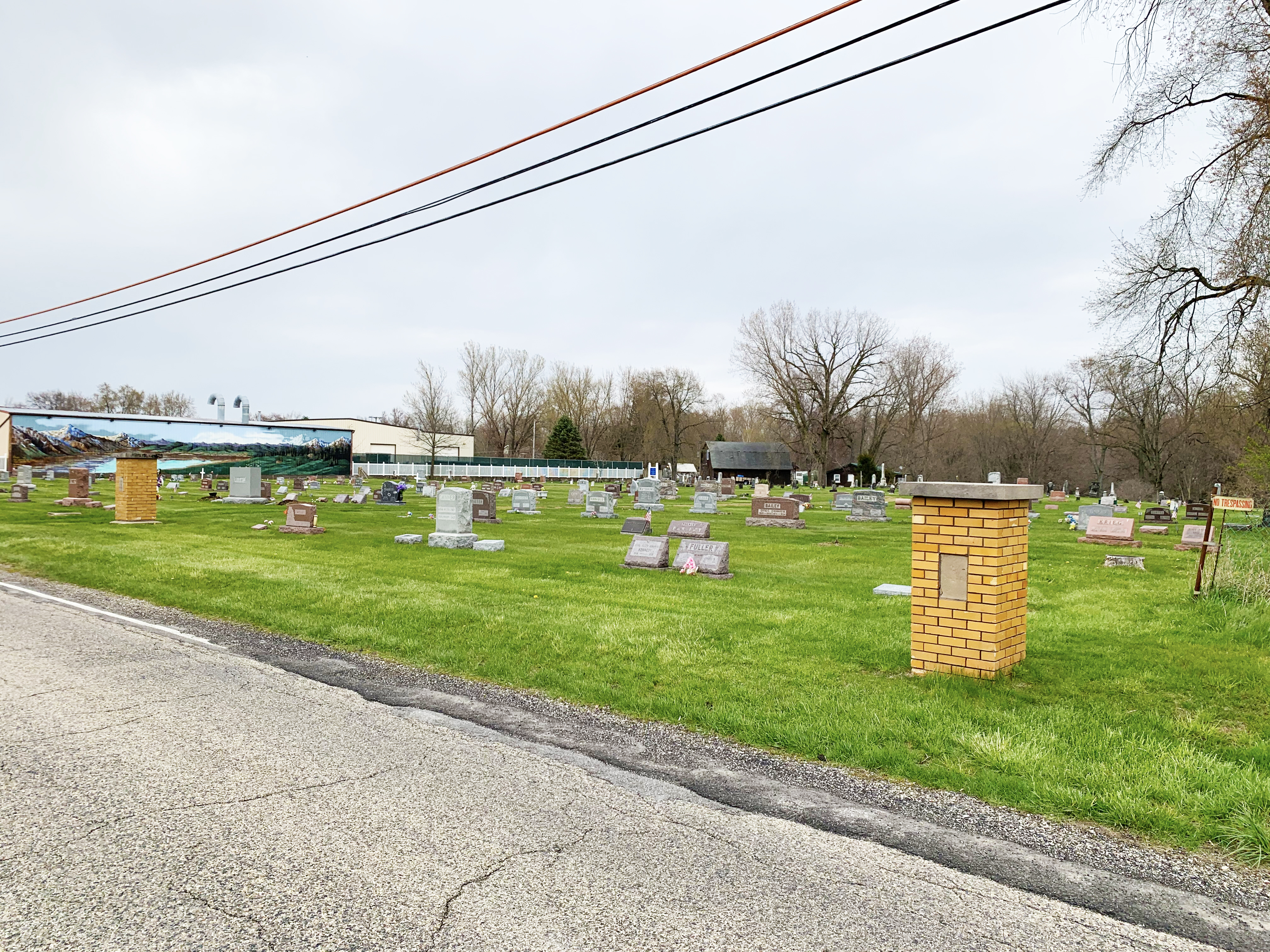
Original Tippecanoe, Indiana Cemetery

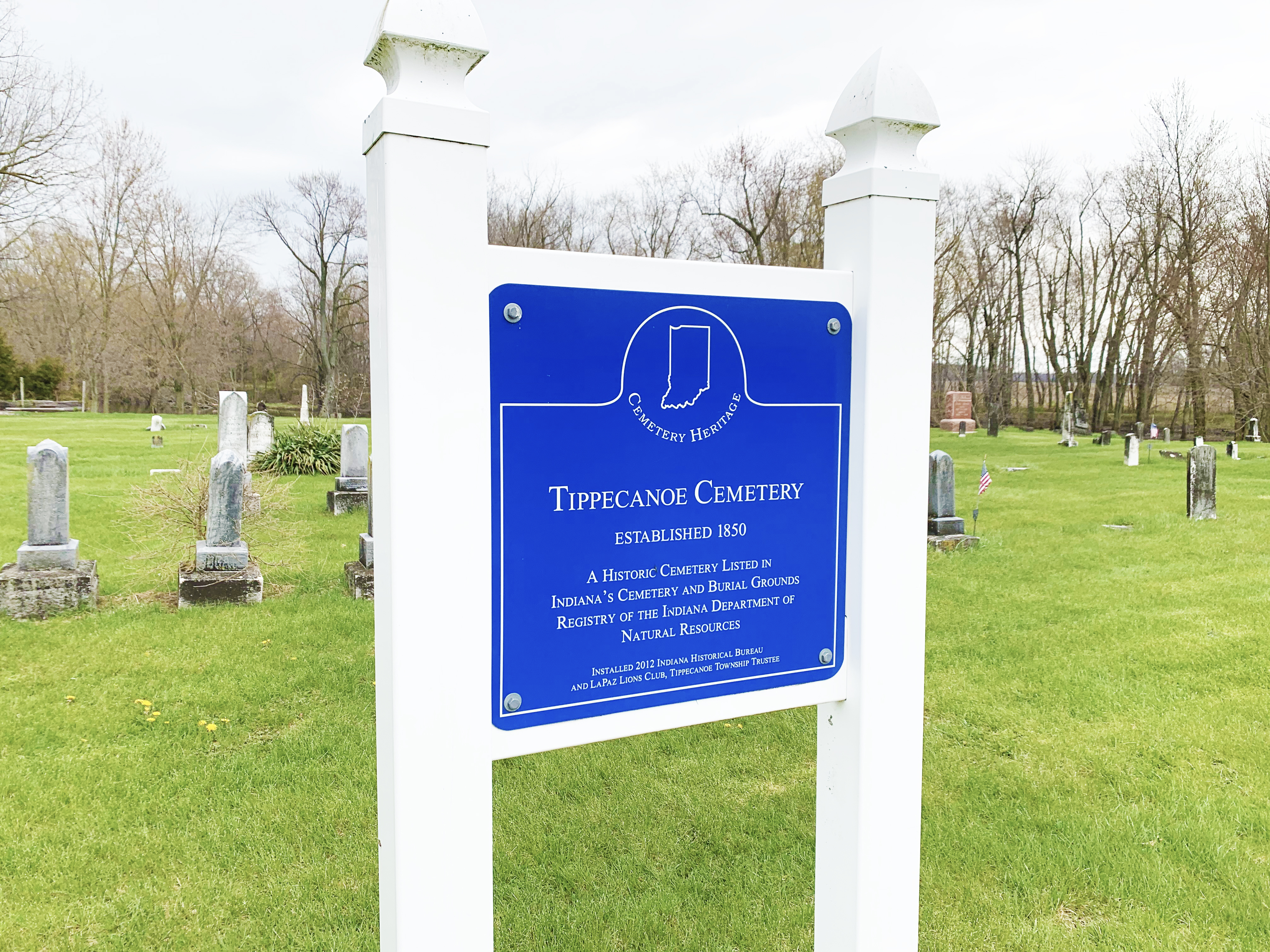

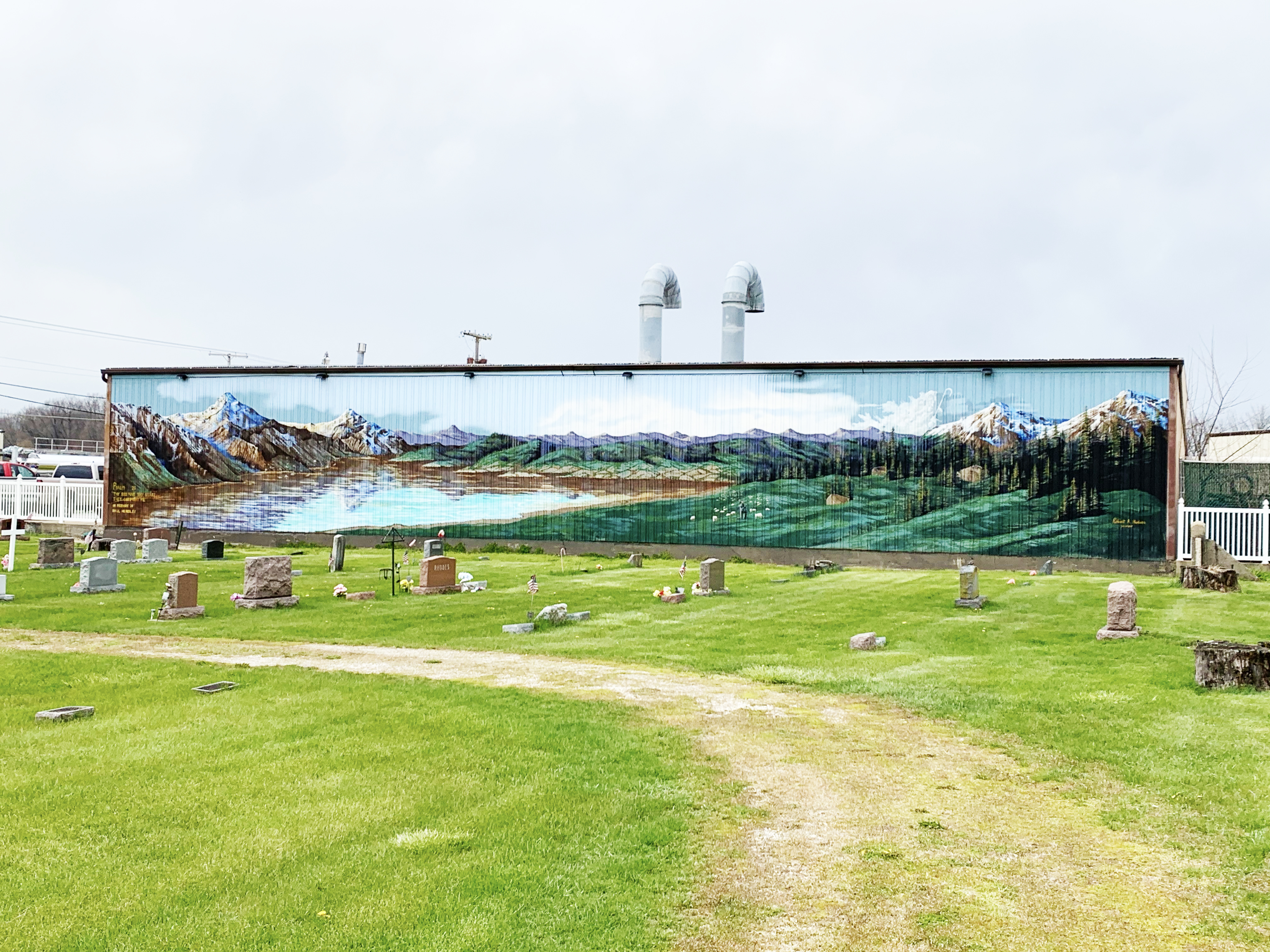
Mural Commissioned by Paul Hensley in 2013
