= Tippecanoe Township =

Tippecanoe Township may refer to the following places in the United States:

== Indiana ==
- Tippecanoe Township, Carroll County, Indiana
- Tippecanoe Township, Kosciusko County, Indiana
- Tippecanoe Township, Marshall County, Indiana
- Tippecanoe Township, Pulaski County, Indiana
- Tippecanoe Township, Tippecanoe County, Indiana

== Iowa ==
- Tippecanoe Township, Henry County, Iowa

== See also ==
- Tippecanoe (disambiguation)
