= Gaskill–Erwin Farm =

- U.S. National Register of Historic Places
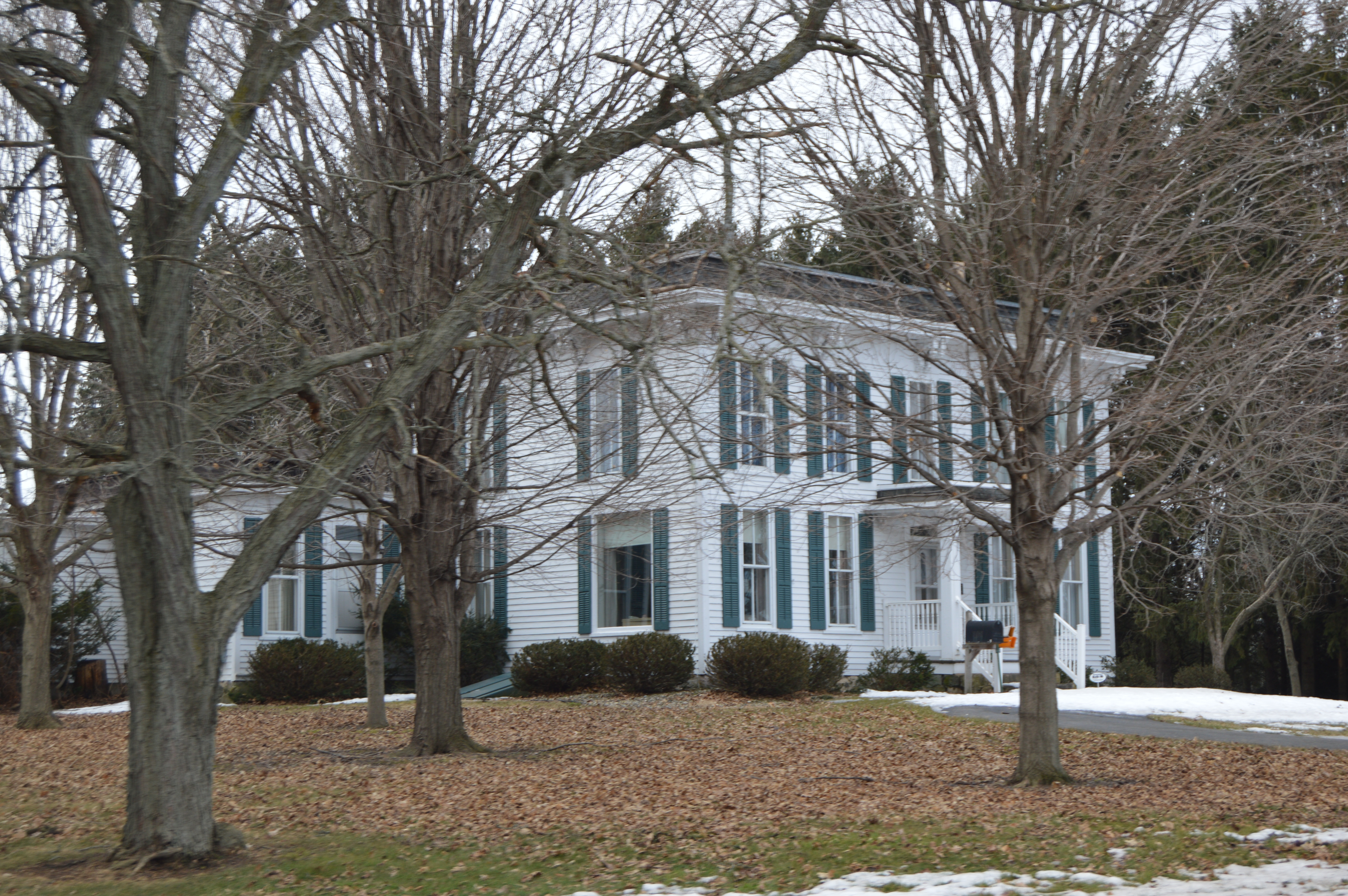
- Gaskill–Erwin Farmhouse, March 2015

- Location within Indiana Location within the United States
- Location: 2595 14-B Rd., Tippecanoe Township, Marshall County, Indiana
- Coordinates: 41°15′59″N 86°06′23″W
- Area: 2.5 acres (1.0 ha)
- Built: c. 1860, 1879, c. 1910, c. 1935
- Architectural style: Italianate
- NRHP reference No.: 15000078
- Added to NRHP: March 17, 2015

Gaskill–Erwin Farm is a historic home and farm located in Tippecanoe Township, Marshall County, Indiana. The farmhouse was built in 1879, and is a two-story, five-bay, Italianate style frame dwelling. It sits on a granite fieldstone foundation and is sheathed in clapboard siding. It features a front porch with mansard roof and decorative brackets. Also on the property are the contributing original Gaskill House (c. 1860) converted to a storage building about 1910 and the Erwin seed corn drying house (c. 1935).

It was listed on the National Register of Historic Places in 2015.
