= Robert Lee Norton House =

Historic house in Florida, United States

- U.S. National Register of Historic Places
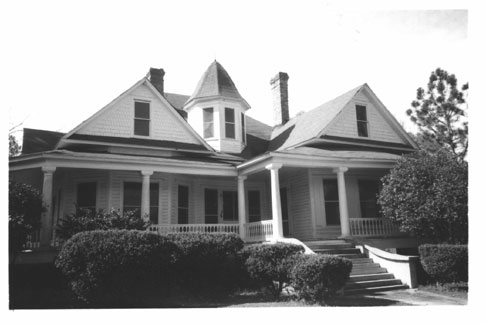

- Location within Florida Location within the United States
- Location: Cypress, Florida
- Coordinates: 30°42′49″N 85°4′25″W
- Area: 3.16 acres (1.28 ha)
- Built: 1904
- Architect: Robert Lee Newton
- Architectural style: Queen Anne
- NRHP reference No.: 96000914
- Added to NRHP: August 22, 1996

The Robert Lee Norton House is a historic house located at 2045 Church Street in Cypress, Florida.

== Description and history ==
The Queen Anne style house was completed in 1904. It was added to the National Register of Historic Places on August 22, 1996.
