= USS Tippecanoe =

USS Tippecanoe may refer to the following ships operated by the United States:

- USS Tippecanoe (1864), was a Canonicus-class monitor launched in 1864, renamed Vesuvius and then Wyandotte in 1869, and decommissioned in 1898.
- USS Tippecanoe (AO-21), was a Patoka-class fleet replenishment oiler launched in 1920, commissioned in 1940, and decommissioned in 1946
- USNS Tippecanoe (T-AO-199) is a Henry J. Kaiser-class underway replenishment oiler in service since 1993
