= Tippecanoe Twp. District No. 3 Schoolhouse and Cemetery =

United States historic place in Indiana

- U.S. National Register of Historic Places
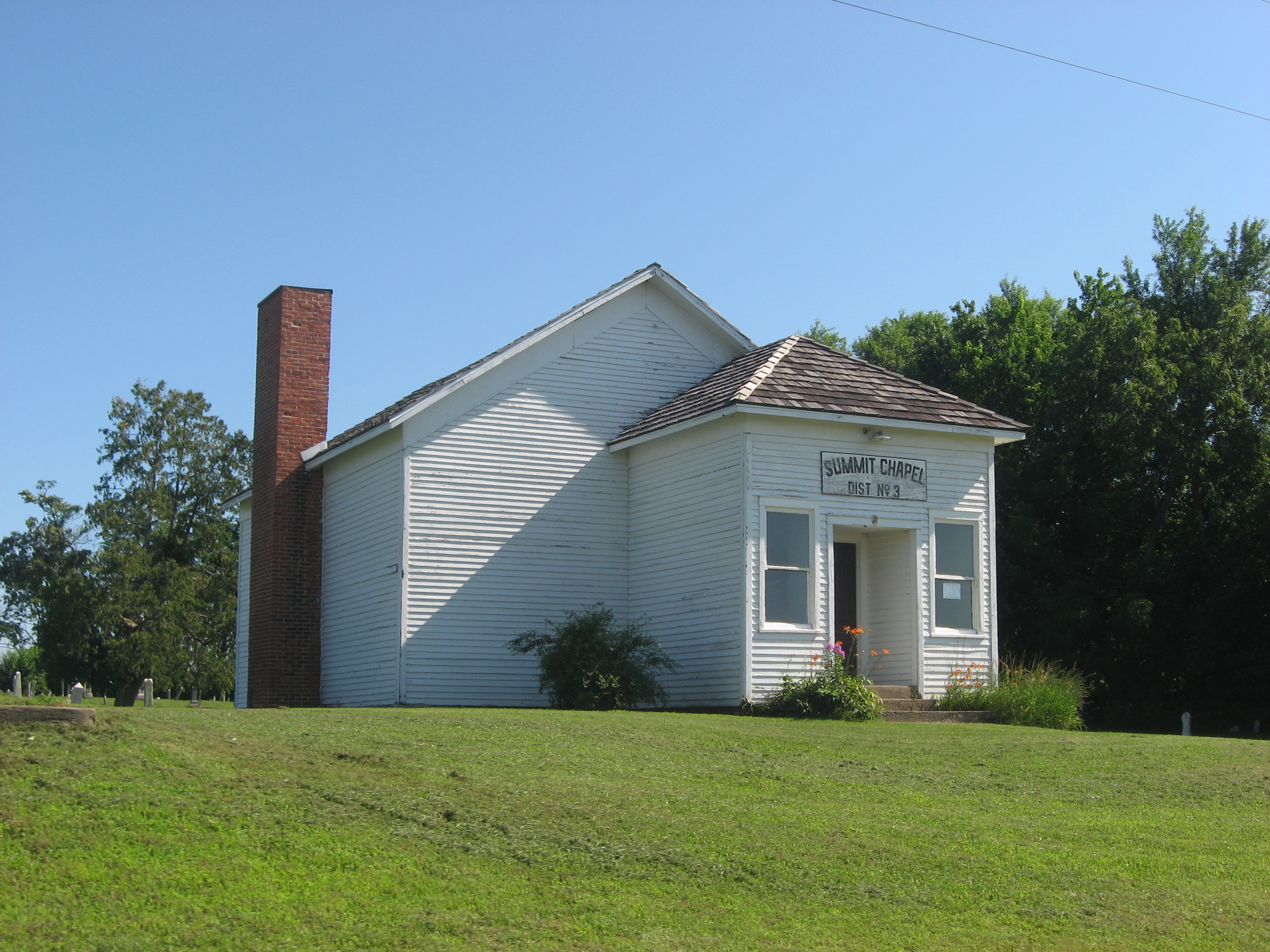
- Summit Chapel School, July 2013

- Location within Indiana Location within the United States
- Location: State Rd 10 at Birch Rd, Tippecanoe, Indiana
- Coordinates: 41°14′45″N 86°5′7″W
- Area: 0.4 acres (0.16 ha)
- Built: 1844
- Architectural style: Greek Revival
- MPS: Indiana's Public Common and High Schools MPS
- NRHP reference No.: 08000567
- Added to NRHP: June 24, 2008

The Tippecanoe Twp. District No. 3 Schoolhouse and Cemetery is a place on the National Register of Historic Places in Tippecanoe, Indiana. It was placed on the Register on June 24, 2008. It includes the former schoolhouse of district 3, also known as the Summit Chapel School, that was built around 1860; a cemetery, established in 1844, and a 1930s outhouse built, presumably, by the Works Progress Administration. It is located on Tippecanoe's Summit Hill, the highest point in Marshall County, marking the southernmost point of a glacial advance. From the hill, the Tippecanoe River, one mile south, can be seen with a 270°view from the school. On the eastern edge is a hedge of osage-oranges.

A.H. Buckham donated the land that comprised the cemetery and school. The burial of his son Hiram in 1844 at the site established the cemetery, with the school built years later. The cemetery's northeast corner marks the highest point of the hill and Marshall County.

The school is a Greek Revival structure, built around 1860. It is a single story frame house, with an area of 25 feet by 30 feet. In 1910 a 12 foot by 13 foot cloak room was added to the structure. There were earlier outhouses for both boys and girls, but when the new WPA outhouse was built in the 1930s, it was a single stall with four feet of total area. The school was built towards the end of a decade where Indiana, following their 1851 state constitution being ratified, stressed the importance of increasing public schools of Indiana, resulting in the number of Hoosier students in public schools going from 161 to 882 in 1858, with only fifteen percent to the districts in the state without public schools.

The cemetery is still an active cemetery.

In 2001 and 2002 a restoration project was begun on the school and outhouse, under the guidance of the Wythougan Valley Preservation Council, a local historic preservation group. A previous student of the school's told the renovators where to properly place the teacher's deck and map stand, and desks of the appropriate area were placed within. Both buildings were repainted, with roof improvements as well.
