= Erwin House (Marshall County, Indiana) =

Historic house in Indiana, United States

- U.S. National Register of Historic Places
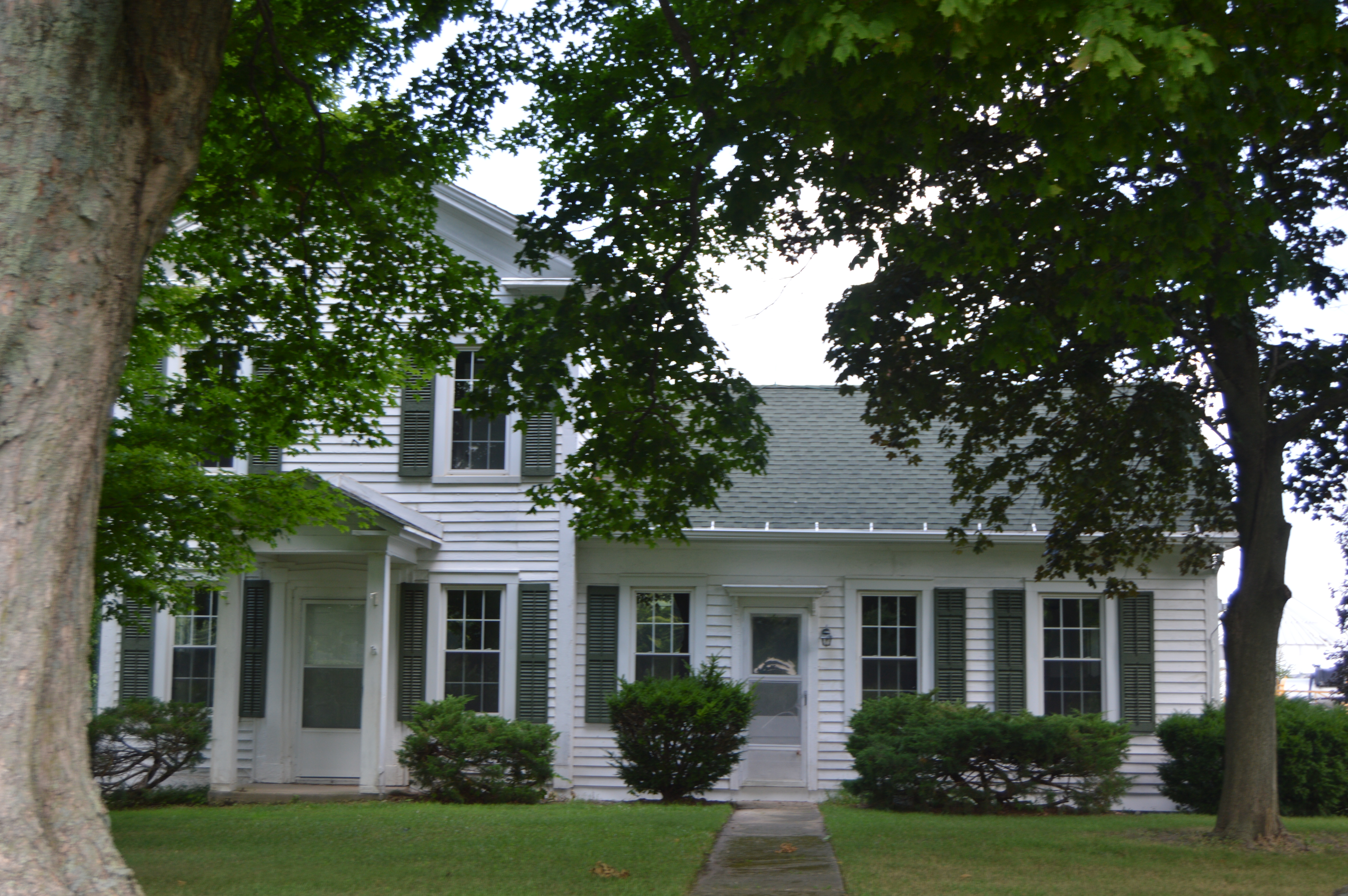
- Front of the house

- Location within Indiana Location within the United States
- Location: 2518 14-B Rd., Tippecanoe Township, Marshall County, Indiana
- Coordinates: 41°16′01″N 86°06′18″W
- Area: less than 1 acre (0.40 ha)
- Built: 1855
- Architectural style: Greek Revival
- NRHP reference No.: 16000080
- Added to NRHP: March 15, 2016

Erwin House is a historic home located in Tippecanoe Township, Marshall County, Indiana. It was built about 1855, and is a two-story, upright, Greek Revival style frame dwelling with 1 1/2-story flanking wings. It sits on a granite fieldstone foundation and is sheathed in clapboard siding. It features a front porch with gable roof.

It was listed on the National Register of Historic Places in 2016.
