= Erwin House (Greenwood, Florida) =

Historic house in Florida, United States

- U.S. National Register of Historic Places
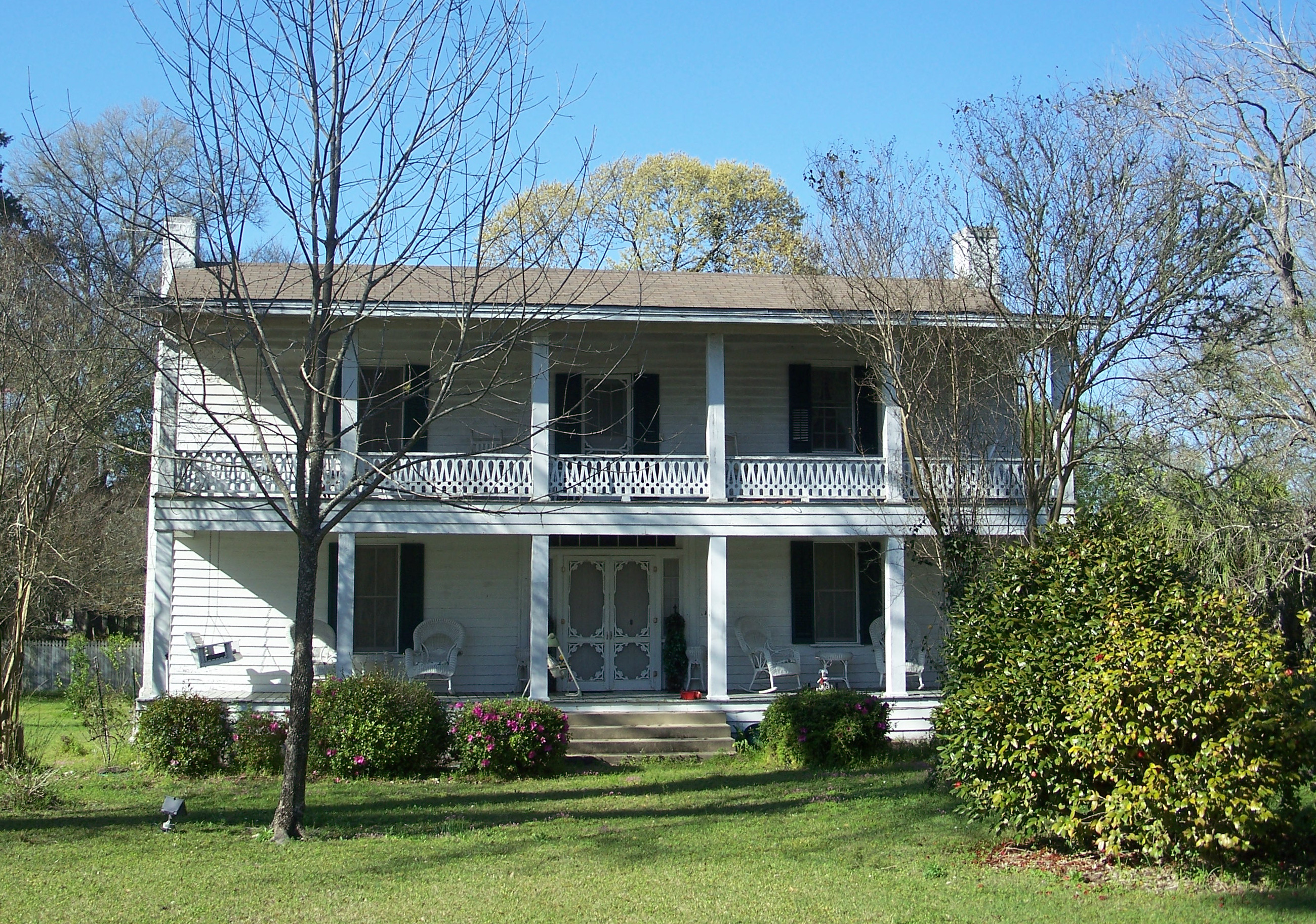
- Erwin House in 2010

- Location within Florida Location within the United States
- Location: Greenwood, Florida
- Coordinates: 30°52′13″N 85°9′42″W
- Architectural style: Frame Vernacular
- NRHP reference No.: 74000642
- Added to NRHP: June 5, 1974

The Erwin House (also known as the Syfrett House) is a historic site in Greenwood, Florida. It is situated on Fort Road, east of SR 71. On June 5, 1974, it was added to the U.S. National Register of Historic Places.

The house was originally home to John A. Syfrett and other small farmers who purchased 150 acres (0.61 km^{2}) of land in Greenwood on January 5, 1839. Although not part of the landed gentry, these respected farmers were important to the agricultural output of Jackson County. The prosperity of the Syfrett family is evidenced by several outbuildings, including a barn, smokehouse, carriage house, office building, and small slave cabin.

The Syfrett farm was sold to Mary Roberts in 1851. The title was transferred through the possession of Henry Bryan to Franklin Hart in 1855. M. F. Erwin purchased the house in 1861, and it has remained in the family since then.

== Bibliography ==
- Jackson County listings at National Register of Historic Places
- Jackson County listings at Florida's Office of Cultural and Historical Programs
- Wynne, Lewis N.; Parks, John T. (2004). Florida's Antebellum Homes. Charleston, South Carolina: Arcadia Publishing. p. 66.
