= Benack's Village, Indiana =

Benack's Village was an Indigenous village located in present-day Marshall County, in the present Potawatomi Wildlife Park. It was protected by terms of a treaty signed by its founder, Stephen Benack, and the United States government. The village existed from 1834 until 1848, one of the few Indian settlements allowed during The Removal Period.

Stephen Benack ("Osheakkebe" in the Potawatomi language) was born of French-Canadian and Potawatomi heritage about 1780, and lived with his Potawatomi lineage. He died in 1855, and was buried at the University of Notre Dame.

The Historical Marker is located at 41.23082°N 86.10537°W.
