= Potawatomi Wildlife Park =

Nonprofit Nature Preserve in Marshall County, IN

- Potawatomi Park, Inc.
- Location within Indiana
- Location: Tippecanoe Township, Marshall County, Indiana, U.S.A.
- Coordinates: 41.23056°N 86.10569°W
- Area: 317 acres (128 ha)
- Designation: Nonprofit Nature Preserve; Indiana’s first Dark Sky Preserve (2003)
- Established: June 1987 (Park Opened); 1979 (Land Donated)
- Administrator: Potawatomi Park, Inc. (Manager: Lacey Pfeiffer, President: Wyatt Stephan)
- Website: https://potawatomiwildlifepark.com/

Potawatomi Wildlife Park is a nonprofit 501(c)(3) nature preserve located in Tippecanoe Township, Marshall County, Indiana, United States. The park spans over 300 acres (≈121 ha) of woodlands, wetlands, prairie, and open spaces along the Tippecanoe River.

== History ==
The land originally belonged to the Potawatomi leader Stephen Benack (“Osheakkebe”), whose village existed in the area from at least 1832 until his forced departure in 1838. In 1979, local farmer Vernon Romine bequeathed 151 acres to a coalition of local Lions and Kiwanis clubs to create a public park. The park incorporated as a nonprofit foundation and became tax-exempt in May 1984. It opened to the public in June 1987.

== Management and mission ==
The park is managed by Potawatomi Park, Inc., a nonprofit organization funded through donations, grants, rentals, and volunteer support. Its mission is to promote environmental stewardship, nature education, and passive outdoor recreation. The current Park Manager is Lacey Pfeiffer

== Features and programs ==
- Dark Sky Preserve: In 2003, the park was designated as Indiana's first official Dark Sky Preserve by the Indiana Council on Lighting Education, the International Dark-Sky Association, and the Indiana State Senate (Senate Resolution #7). The park has a dedicated observation field and regularly hosts astronomy programs.
- Trails and Wildlife: Over 5 miles of hiking trails traverse habitats home to eagles, osprey, river otters, turtles, deer, and more.
- Historical Interpretation: The park preserves the site of the Stephen Benack Potawatomi village and includes a restored 1834 cabin, the oldest structure in Marshall County.
- Educational Initiatives: The park offers school programs, guided tours, and an interactive forestry/pollinator trail supported by a 2025 Arrowhead Country grant through Purdue Extension.

== Access ==
The park is open to the public year-round from sunrise to sunset. The observation field is available after dusk by special arrangement. Admission is free.

== See also ==
- Dark-sky preserve
- Potawatomi people
