= St. Luke Baptist Church =

Historic church in Florida, United States

- U.S. National Register of Historic Places
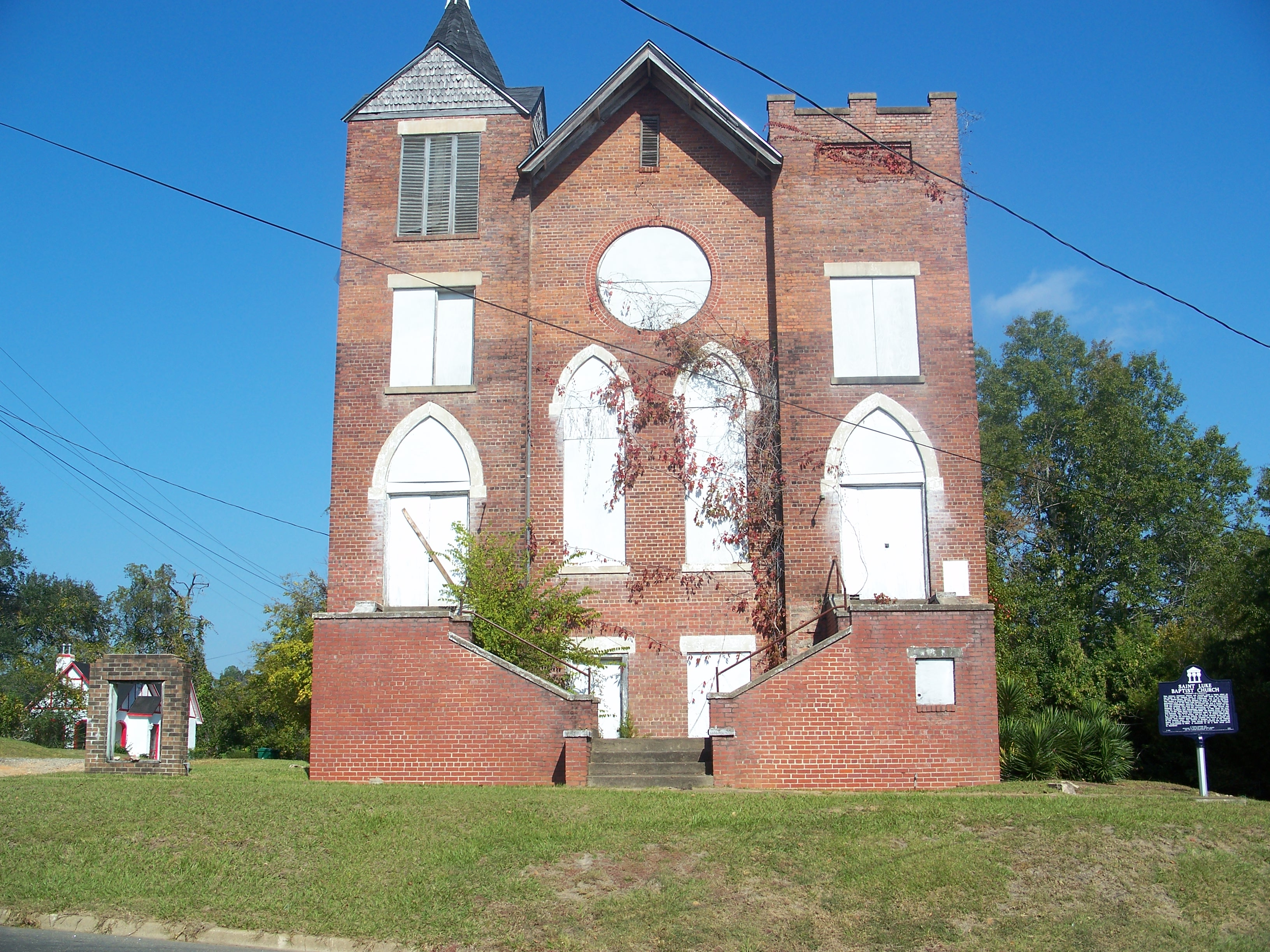

- Location within Florida Location within the United States
- Location: Marianna, Florida, USA
- Coordinates: 30°46′23″N 85°13′24″W
- Built: 1921
- Architectural style: Gothic Revival
- NRHP reference No.: 03000008
- Added to NRHP: February 12, 2003

The St. Luke Baptist Church (also known as the St. Luke Missionary Baptist Church) is a historic site in Marianna, Florida. Built in 1921, it is located at 4476 East Jackson Street. On February 12, 2003, it was added to the U.S. National Register of Historic Places. The church was nearly destroyed in Hurricane Michael in October 2018; in 2025, plans were revealed to create a park on the church ruins' site.
