= Great Oaks (Greenwood, Florida) =

Historic house in Florida, United States

- U.S. National Register of Historic Places
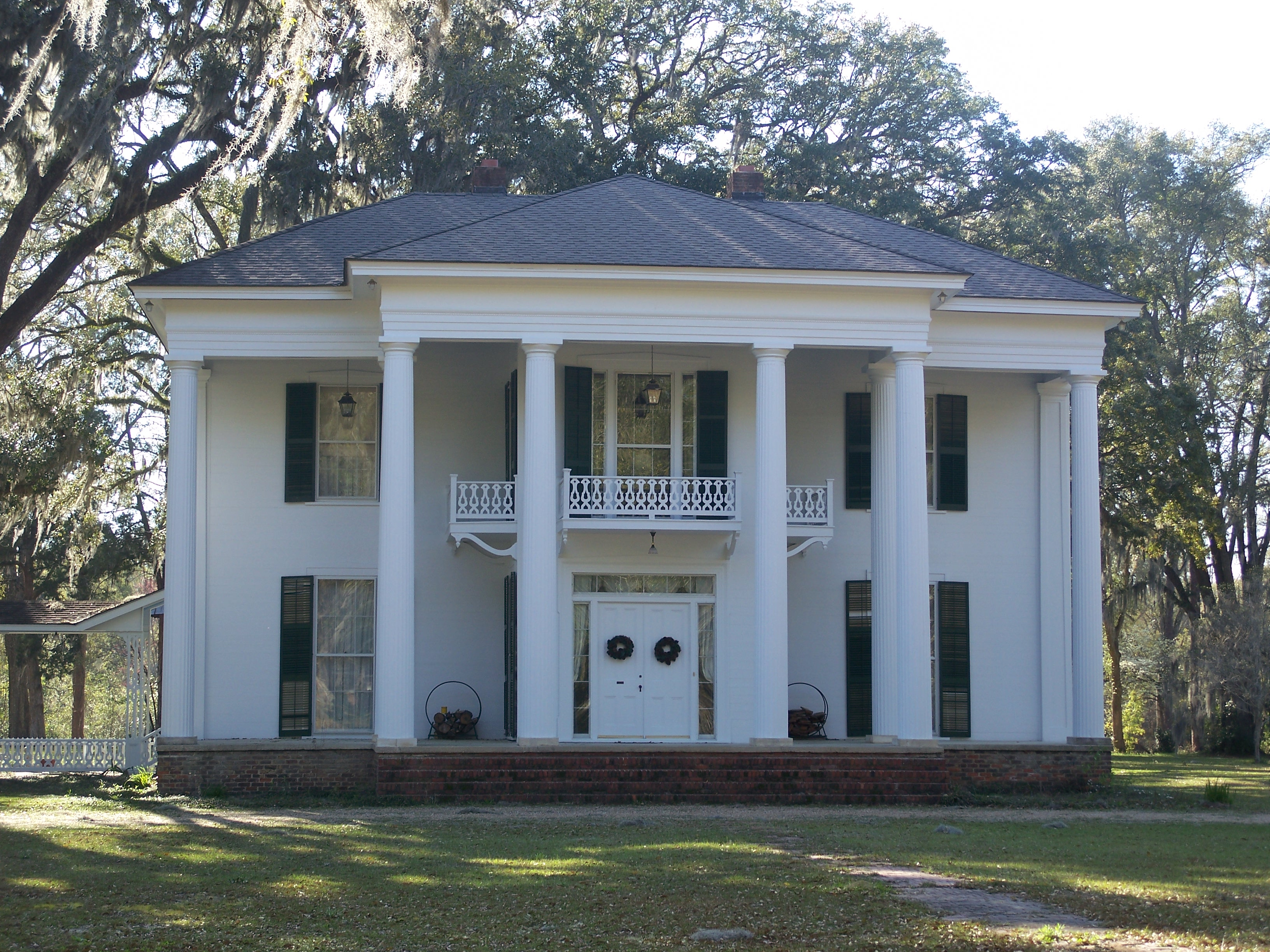

- Location within Florida Location within the United States
- Location: S of jct. of FL 69 and 71, Greenwood, Florida
- Coordinates: 30°51′55″N 85°09′48″W
- Area: less than one acre
- Built: 1857
- Architectural style: Greek Revival
- NRHP reference No.: 72000325
- Added to NRHP: December 5, 1972

The Great Oaks (also known as the Bryan Mansion) is a historic site in Greenwood, Florida. It is located south of the junction of SR 69 and 71. In 1972, it was added to the U.S. National Register of Historic Places.

It was built during 1857 to 1861. Its NRHP nomination states:

Great Oaks Plantation represents some of the best features of the Greek Revival style of architecture and yet it is reflective of a type of dwelling which seems to have been indigenous to the plantation societies of the South. That is to say, it is not Greek Revival architecture in its purest form, but rather an adaptation, probably the work of a local artisan, to the demands of a self-sustaining aristocracy.
