= Cypress, Florida =

Unincorporated community in Florida, U.S.

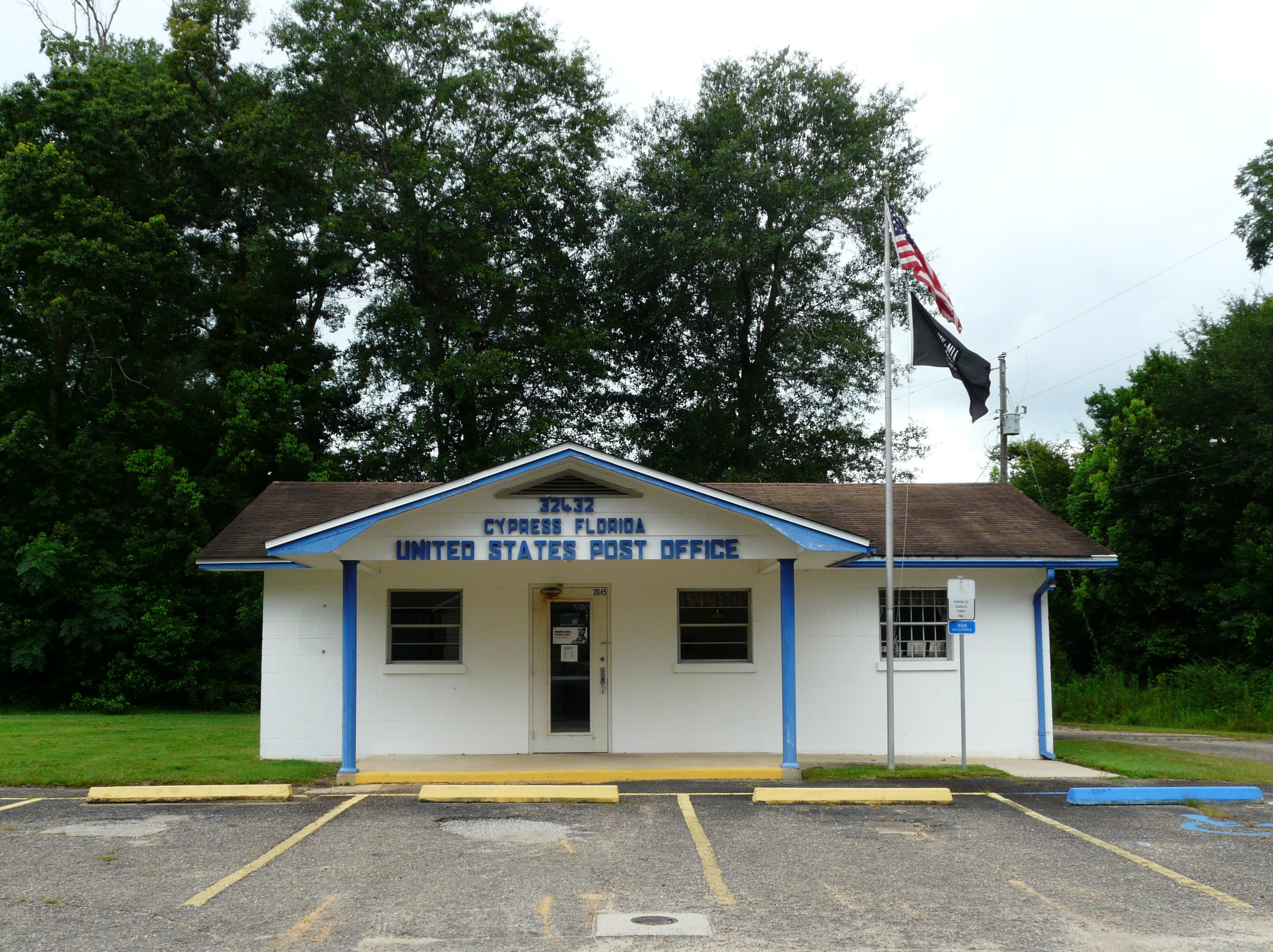
Cypress Post Office

Cypress is an unincorporated community in Jackson County, Florida, United States. It is located near the intersection of U.S. Route 90 and County Road 275, west of Grand Ridge.

== Geography ==
Cypress is located at 30°42′47″N 85°04′26″W.
