= USNS Tippecanoe =

Oiler of the United States Navy

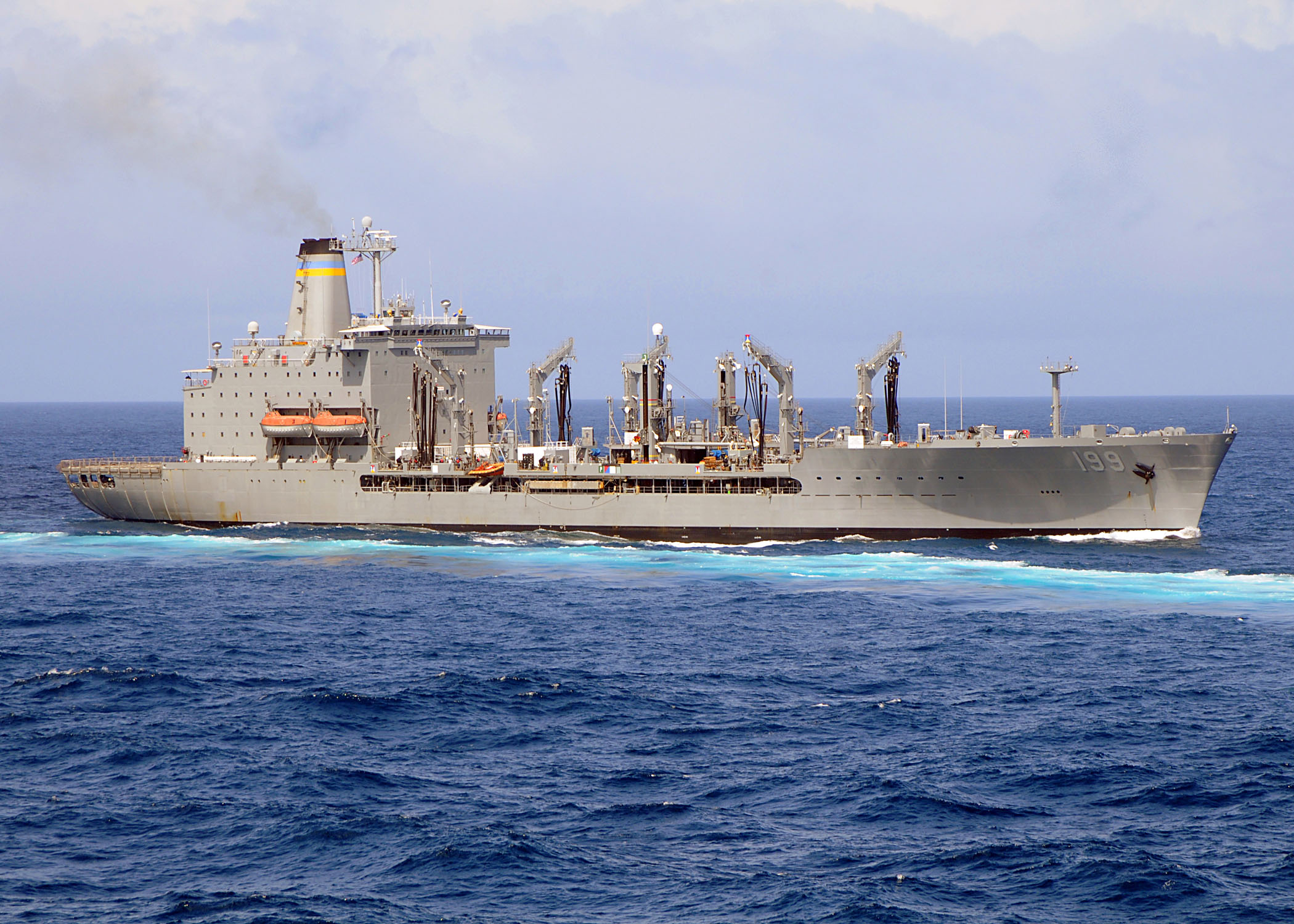
- USNS Tippecanoe (T-AO-199)

History

United States
- Name: USNS Tippecanoe
- Namesake: The Tippecanoe River in Indiana
- Ordered: 24 March 1989
- Builder: Avondale Shipyard, Inc., New Orleans, Louisiana
- Laid down: 19 November 1990
- Launched: 16 May 1992
- In service: 8 February 1993-present
- Identification: IMO number: 8906602; MMSI number: 367860000; Callsign: NTIP
- Status: In active Military Sealift Command service
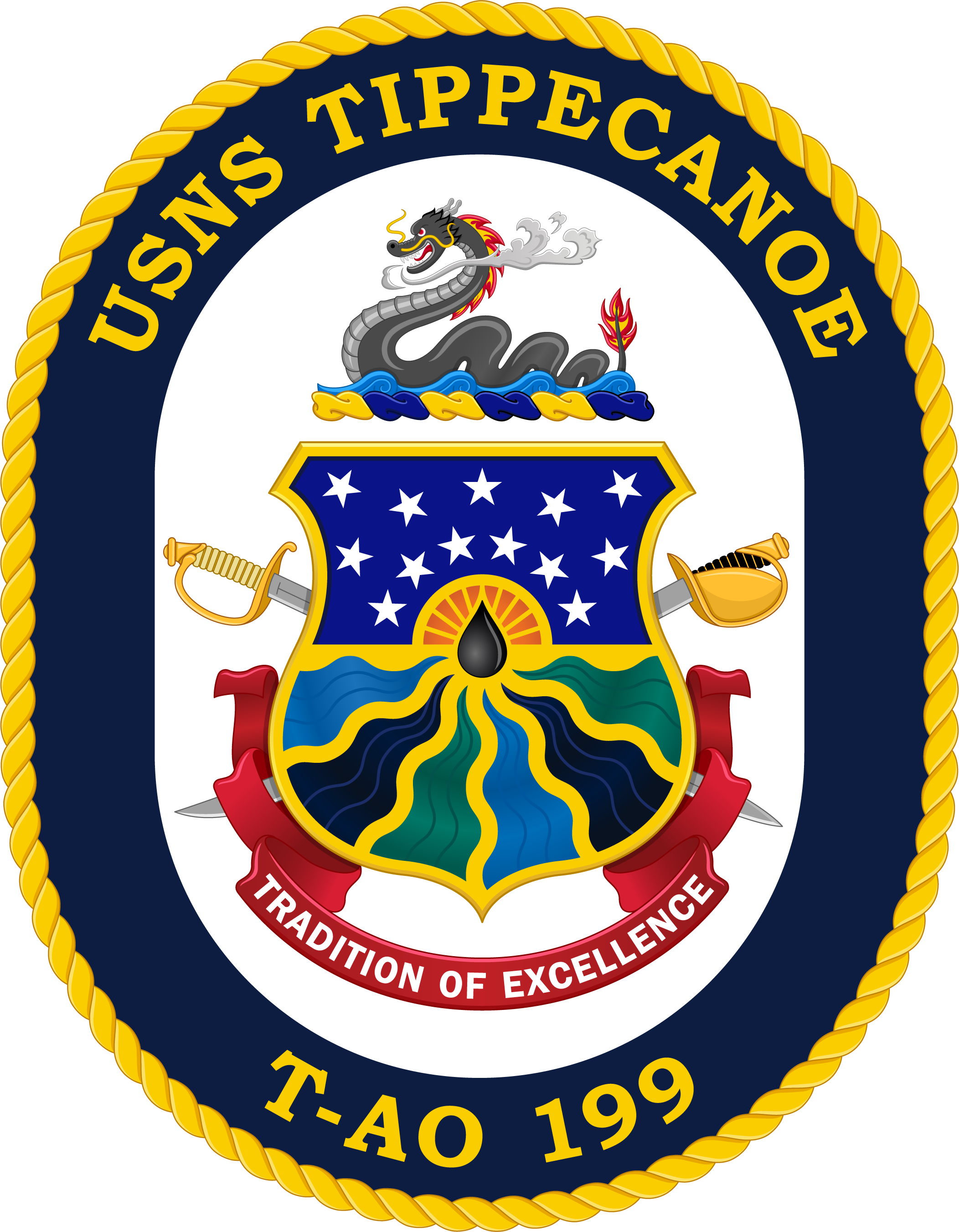
- Badge

General characteristics
- Class & type: Henry J. Kaiser-class replenishment oiler
- Type: Fleet replenishment oiler
- Tonnage: 31,200 deadweight tons
- Displacement: 9,500 tons light; Full load variously reported as 42,382 tons and 40,700 long tons (41,353 metric tons)
- Length: 677 ft (206 m)
- Beam: 97 ft 5 in (29.69 m)
- Draft: 35 ft (11 m) maximum
- Installed power: 16,000 hp (11.9 MW) per shaft; 34,442 hp (25.7 MW) total sustained
- Propulsion: Two medium-speed Colt-Pielstick PC4-2/2 10V-570 diesel engines, two shafts, controllable-pitch propellers
- Speed: 20 knots (37 km/h; 23 mph)
- Capacity: 178,000 to 180,000 barrels (28,300 to 28,600 m^{3}) of fuel oil and jet fuel; 7,400 sq ft (690 m^{2}) dry cargo space; eight 20-foot (6.1 m) refrigerated containers with room for 128 pallets
- Complement: 103 (18 civilian officers, 1 U.S. Navy officer, 64 merchant seamen, 20 U.S. Navy enlisted personnel)
- Armament: Peacetime: usually none; Wartime: probably 2 x 20 mm Phalanx CIWS
- Aircraft carried: None
- Aviation facilities: Helicopter landing platform
- Notes: Five refueling stations; Two dry cargo transfer rigs

USNS Tippecanoe (T-AO-199) is a Henry J. Kaiser-class underway replenishment oiler operated by the Military Sealift Command (MSC) to support ships of the United States Navy. She serves in the United States Pacific Fleet. Tippecanoe, the thirteenth ship of the Henry J. Kaiser class, was laid down at Avondale Shipyard, Inc., at New Orleans, Louisiana, on 19 November 1990 and launched on 16 May 1992. She entered non-commissioned U.S. Navy service under the control of the MSC with a primarily civilian crew on 8 February 1993.

Tippecanoe was deployed to East Timor as part of the Australian-led INTERFET peacekeeping taskforce from 16 to 24 October 1999. In January 2005, Tippecanoe was part of the American relief effort in response to the Indian Ocean tsunami of 26 December 2004.

== Design ==
The Henry J. Kaiser-class replenishment oilers were preceded by the shorter Cimarron-class replenishment oilers. Tippecanoe has an overall length of 206.5 metres (677 ft 6 in). It has a beam of 29.7 metres (97 ft) and a draft of 11 metres (36 ft). The oiler has a displacement of 41,353 tonnes (40,700 long tons; 45,584 short tons) at full load. It has a capacity of 180,000 imperial barrels (29,000,000 L; 6,500,000 imp gal; 7,800,000 US gal) of aviation fuel or fuel oil. It can carry a dry load of 690 square metres (7,400 sq ft) and can refrigerate 128 pallets of food. The ship is powered by two 10 PC4.2 V 570 Colt-Pielstick diesel engines that drive two shafts; this gives a power of 25.6 megawatts (34,800 PS; 34,300 shp).

The Henry J. Kaiser-class oilers have maximum speeds of 20 knots (37 km/h; 23 mph). They were built without armaments but can be fitted with close-in weapon systems. The ship has a helicopter platform but not any maintenance facilities. It is fitted with five fuelling stations; these can fill two ships at the same time and the ship is capable of pumping 900,000 US gallons (3,400,000 L; 750,000 imp gal) of diesel or 540,000 US gallons (2,000,000 L; 450,000 imp gal) of jet fuel per hour. It has a complement of eighty-nine civilians (nineteen officers), twenty-nine spare crew, and six United States Navy crew.

== Photos ==
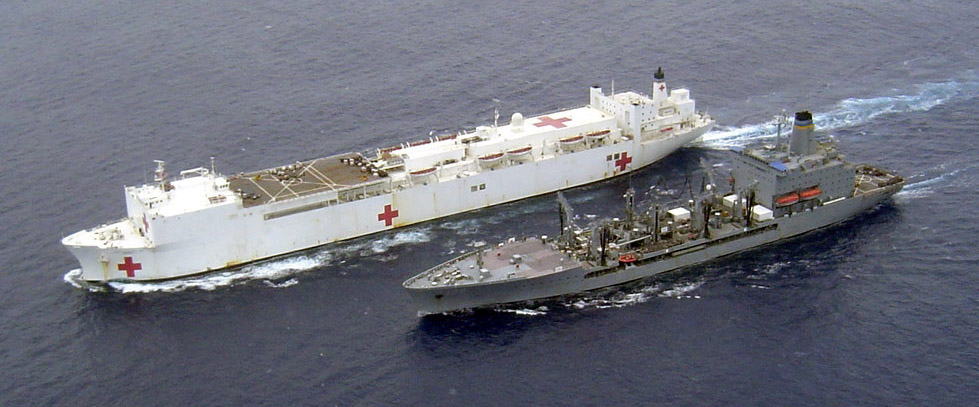
Tippecanoe and Military Sealift Command hospital ship USNS Mercy (T-AH-19) conduct a replenishment at sea in the Indian Ocean on 8 April 2005.

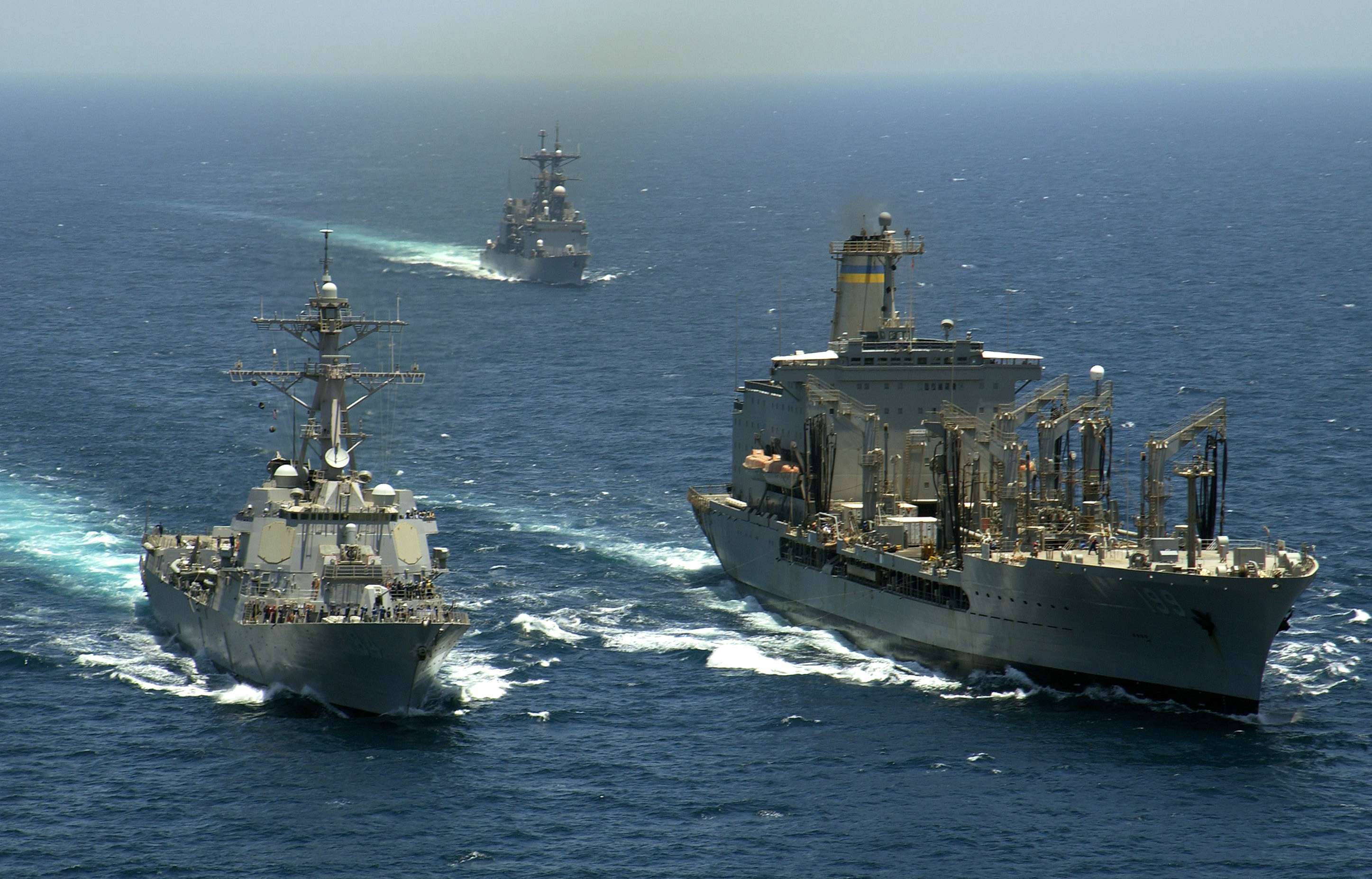
Tippecanoe refuels guided-missile destroyer USS Bulkeley (DDG-84).

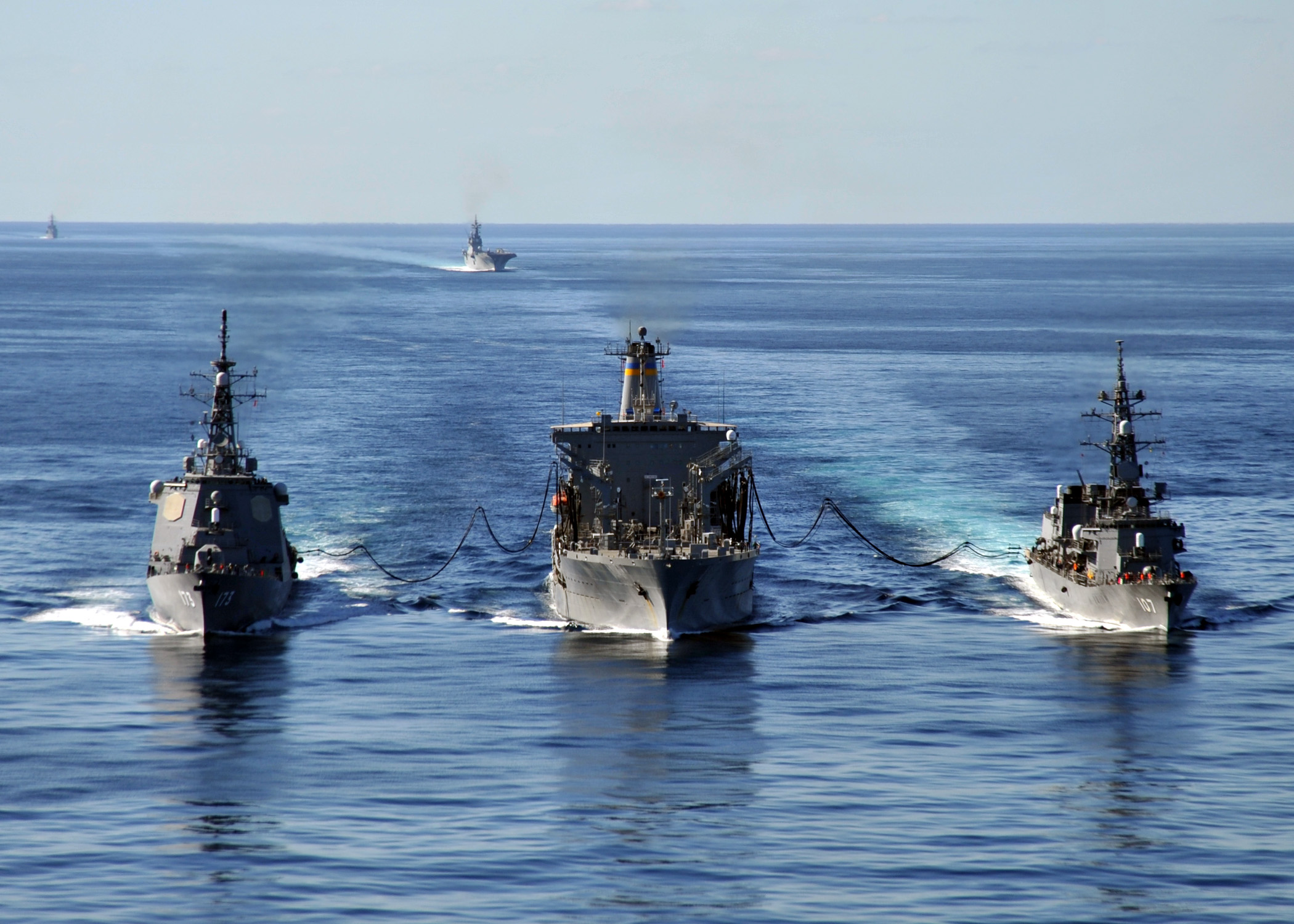
Tippecanoe refuels Japanese Maritime Self-Defense Force guided-missile destroyer JS Kongō and destroyer JS Ikazuchi (DD-107) on 5 December 2010.
