= Tippecanoe Township, Marshall County, Indiana =

Tippecanoe Township
- Township
- Location in Marshall County
- Coordinates: 41°13′07″N 86°06′15″W
- Country: United States
- State: Indiana
- County: Marshall

Government
  - Type: Indiana township
  - Trustee: Matthew Pitney

Area
  - Total: 35.8 sq mi (93 km^{2})
  - Land: 35.75 sq mi (92.6 km^{2})
  - Water: 0.05 sq mi (0.13 km^{2}) 0.14%
- Elevation: 781 ft (238 m)

Population (2020)
  - Total: 1,322
  - Density: 36.7/sq mi (14.2/km^{2})
- ZIP codes: 46504, 46539, 46570
- GNIS feature ID: 0453896

Tippecanoe Township is one of ten townships in Marshall County, Indiana, United States. As of the 2020 census, its population was 1,322 (slightly up from 1,313 at 2010) and it contained 529 housing units.

== History ==
Tippecanoe Township was organized in 1842. It was named from its principal stream, the Tippecanoe River.

The Erwin House, Gaskill-Erwin Farm, and Tippecanoe Twp. District No. 3 Schoolhouse and Cemetery are listed on the National Register of Historic Places.

== Geography ==
According to the 2010 census, the township has a total area of 35.8 square miles (93 km^{2}), of which 35.75 square miles (92.6 km^{2}) (or 99.86%) is land and 0.05 square miles (0.13 km^{2}) (or 0.14%) is water.

=== Unincorporated towns ===
- Old Tip Town at 41.223655°N 86.115277°W
- Tippecanoe at 41.208933°N 86.114999°W

(This list is based on USGS data and may include former settlements.)

=== Cemeteries ===
The township contains two cemeteries: Tippecanoe Cemetery, and Summit Chapel Cemetery.

=== Major highways ===
- SR 10
- SR 331

== School districts ==
- Triton School Corporation
- Argos Community Schools
- Tippecanoe Valley School Corporation

== Political districts ==
- Indiana's 2nd congressional district
- State House District 23
- State Senate District 9
