= Greenwood, Florida =

- Town
- Town of Greenwood
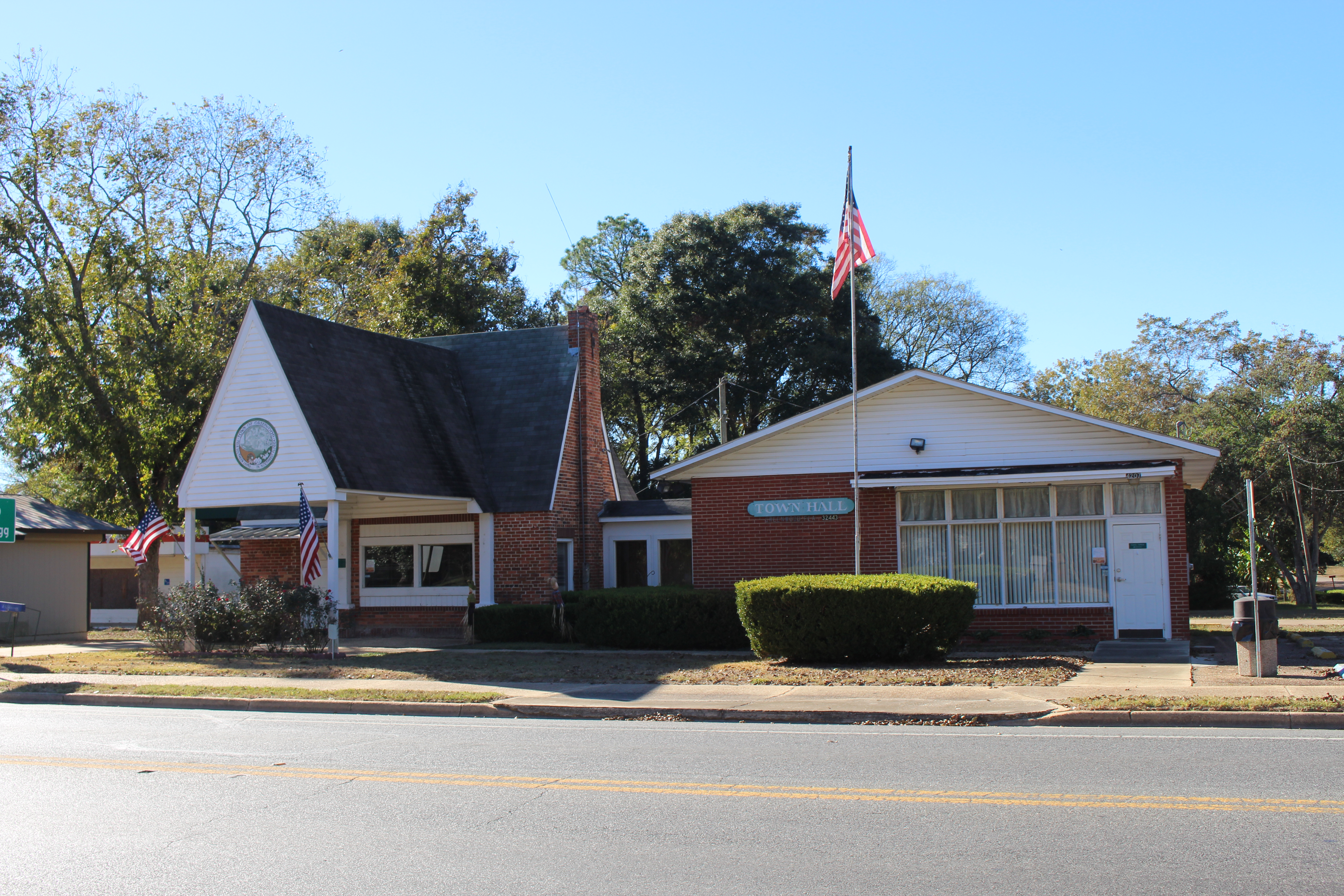
- Greenwood Town Hall
- Motto: "True Southern Living...in Northwest Florida"
- Location in Jackson County and the state of Florida
- Coordinates: 30°52′43″N 85°09′39″W
- Country: United States
- State: Florida
- County: Jackson
- Settled: 1824
- Incorporated: 1927

Government
  - Type: Mayor-Council
  - Mayor: Phyllis Bowman
  - Councilors: Bryan S. Johnson, Mamie Vann, and Thomas Andreasen
  - Town Clerk: Alicia L. Corder
  - Town Attorney: George Little

Area
  - Total: 4.56 sq mi (11.82 km^{2})
  - Land: 4.56 sq mi (11.82 km^{2})
  - Water: 0 sq mi (0.00 km^{2})
- Elevation: 112 ft (34 m)

Population (2020)
  - Total: 539
  - Density: 118/sq mi (45.6/km^{2})
- Time zone: UTC-6 (Central (CST))
  - Summer (DST): UTC-5 (CDT)
- ZIP code: 32443
- Area code(s): 850, 448
- FIPS code: 12-27600
- GNIS feature ID: 2406618
- Website: www.townofgreenwood.org

Greenwood is a town in Jackson County, Florida, United States. It is part of the Florida Panhandle and located in North Florida, specifically Northwest Florida. The population was 539 at the 2020 census.

== History ==
The Town of Greenwood was settled in 1824, and was officially incorporated as a municipality in 1927.

== Geography ==
According to the United States Census Bureau, the town has a total area of 4.8 square miles (12 km^{2}), all land. Greenwood is ten miles from the county seat, Marianna, and the town of Malone. Both are much larger than Greenwood, and most residents of the area go to school or work in either of those two towns.

=== Climate ===
The climate in this area is characterized by hot, humid summers and generally mild winters. According to the Köppen climate classification, the Town of Greenwood has a humid subtropical climate zone (Cfa).

== Demographics ==
Historical population
Census	Pop.	Note	%±
1940	293		—
1960	427		—
1970	449		5.2%
1980	577		28.5%
1990	474		−17.9%
2000	735		55.1%
2010	686		−6.7%
2020	539		−21.4%
U.S. Decennial Census

=== 2010 and 2020 census ===
Greenwood racial composition (Hispanics excluded from racial categories) (NH = Non-Hispanic)
Race	Pop 2010	Pop 2020	% 2010	% 2020
White (NH)	449	319	65.45%	59.18%
Black or African American (NH)	208	174	30.32%	32.28%
Native American or Alaska Native (NH)	3	3	0.44%	0.56%
Asian (NH)	0	0	0.00%	0.00%
Pacific Islander or Native Hawaiian (NH)	0	0	0.00%	0.00%
Some other race (NH)	1	2	0.15%	0.37%
Two or more races/Multiracial (NH)	7	20	1.02%	3.71%
Hispanic or Latino (any race)	18	21	2.62%	3.90%
Total	686	539	100.00%	100.00%

As of the 2020 United States census, there were 539 people, 213 households, and 154 families residing in the town.

As of the 2010 United States census, there were 686 people, 260 households, and 181 families residing in the town.

=== 2000 census ===
As of the census of 2000, there were 735 people, 296 households, and 200 families residing in the town. The population density was 153.3 inhabitants per square mile (59.2/km^{2}). There were 335 housing units at an average density of 69.9 per square mile (27.0/km^{2}). The racial makeup of the town was 66.67% White, 26.94% African American, 1.22% Native American, 0.95% Asian, 1.90% from other races, and 2.31% from two or more races. Hispanic or Latino of any race were 2.72% of the population.

In 2000, there were 300 households, out of which 29.1% had children under the age of 18 living with them, 52.4% were married couples living together, 11.8% had a female householder with no husband present, and 32.1% were non-families. 29.4% of all households were made up of individuals, and 13.5% had someone living alone who was 65 years of age or older. The average household size was 2.44 and the average family size was 2.99.

In 2000, in the town, the population was spread out, with 26.4% under the age of 18, 7.2% from 18 to 24, 24.6% from 25 to 44, 25.0% from 45 to 64, and 16.7% who were 65 years of age or older. The median age was 38 years. For every 100 females, there were 87.0 males. For every 100 females age 18 and over, there were 89.8 males.

In 2000, the median income for a household in the town was $28,750, and the median income for a family was $35,750. Males had a median income of $24,583 versus $22,083 for females. The per capita income for the town was $14,243. About 9.1% of families and 17.8% of the population were below the poverty line, including 21.6% of those under age 18 and 11.6% of those age 65 or over.

== Transportation ==
- State Road 71

== Gallery ==
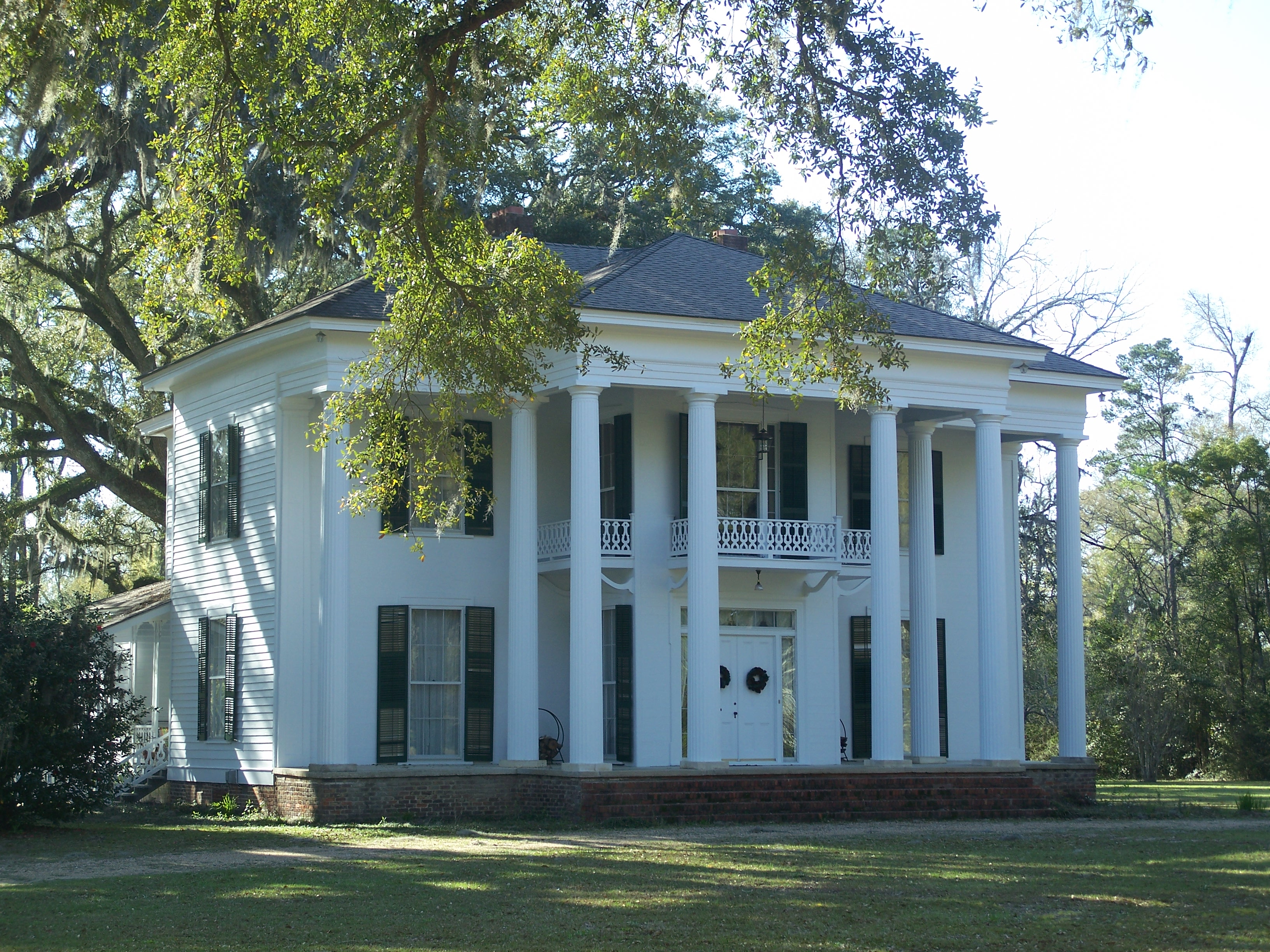
Great Oaks, Bryan Plantation

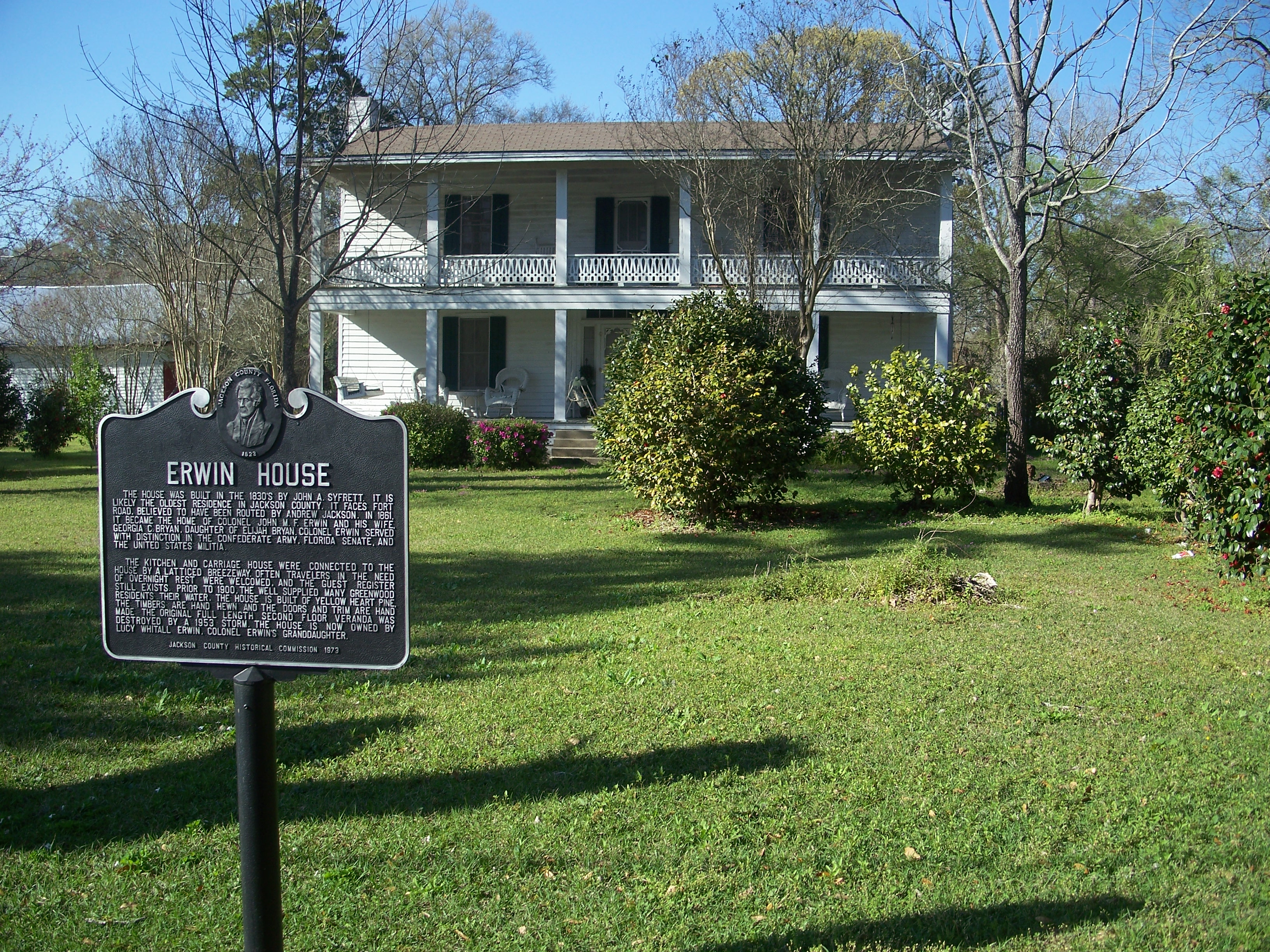
Historic Erwin House

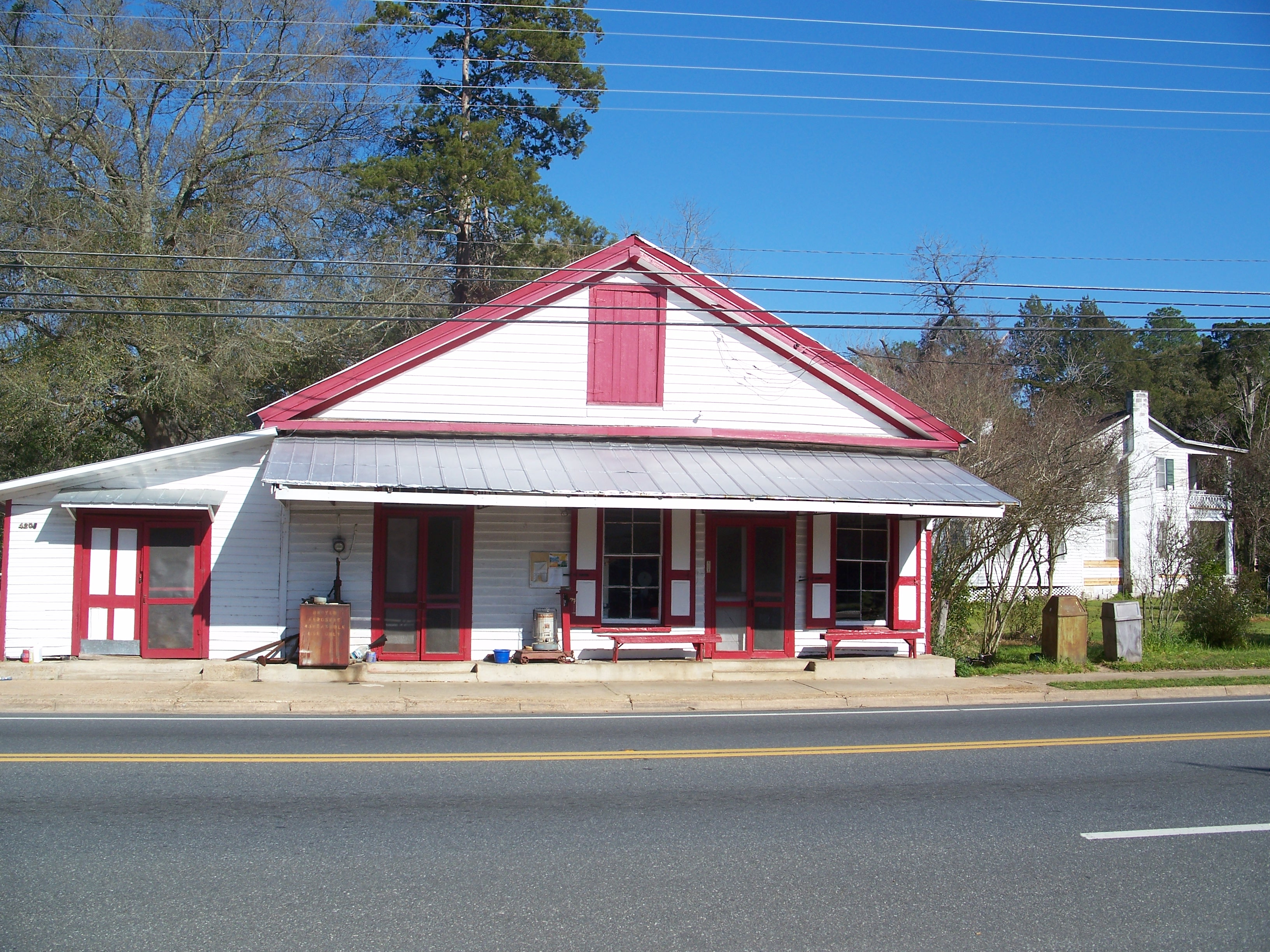
Historic Penders Store
