= List of United States political families (L) =

The following is an alphabetical list of political families in the United States whose last name begins with L.

== Lafargues and the Irions ==
- Pierre-Adolphe Lafargue (1818–1869), superintendent of schools for Avoyelles Parish, mayor of Marksville, father of Adolphe Lafargue, grandfather of Alvan Lafarge, and great-grandfather of Malcolm Lafargue
- Alfred Briggs Irion (1833–1902), U. S. representative from Louisiana's 6th congressional district 1885–87; Louisiana state appeals court judge 1880–84, member of the Louisiana House of Representatives 1864–65, grandfather of Alvan Lafargue, great-grandfather of Malcolm Lafargue, father-in-law of Adolphe Lafargue
  - Adolphe Jolna Lafargue (1855–1917), member of the Louisiana House of Representatives from Avoyelles Parish and state district court judge, father of Alvan Lafargue, grandfather of Malcolm Lafargue, and son-in-law of Alfred Irion
  - Arnaud D. Lafargue (1845–1917), member of the Louisiana House from 1916 to 1917; died in office, brother of Adolphe Lafargue, uncle of Alvan Lafargue, and great-uncle of Malcolm Lafargue
    - Alvan Lafargue (1883–1963), country physician and mayor of Sulphur, Louisiana, 1926–38, son of Adolphe Lafargue and uncle of Malcolm Lafargue
      - Malcolm Lafargue (1908–1963), U.S. Attorney for the United States District Court for the Western District of Louisiana in Shreveport, 1941–50; defeated candidate for the United States Senate in 1950, grandson of Adolphe Lafargue, nephew of Alvan Lafargue, great-grandson of Alfred Briggs Irion

== Laffoons ==
- Polk Laffoon (1844–1906), U.S. Representative from Kentucky 1885–89. Father of Polk Laffoon.
  - Polk Laffoon (1877–1945), delegate to the Democratic National Convention 1932. Son of Polk Laffoon.
  - Ruby Laffoon (1869–1941), Treasurer of Kentucky 1907, Kentucky Circuit Court Judge 1921–31, Governor of Kentucky 1931–35, delegate to the Democratic National Convention 1932 1940, Democratic National Committeeman 1936. Nephew of Polk Laffoon.
  - Mary Laffoon (1874–1972), delegate to the Democratic National Convention 1944 1948 1952 1960. Wife of Ruby Laffoon.

== LaFortunes and Bynums ==
- Robert J. LaFortune (1927-2024), Delegate to the Republican National Convention from Oklahoma, 1972; 31st Mayor of Tulsa, Oklahoma, 1970-1978.
  - Bill LaFortune (born 1957), District Attorney of Tulsa County, 1995-1998; 37th Mayor of Tulsa, 2002-2006; District Judge of Oklahoma's 14th Judicial District, 2015-present. Nephew of Robert J. LaFortune.
  - G. T. Bynum (born 1977), Member of the Tulsa City Council, 2008-2016; 40th Mayor of Tulsa, 2016-2024. Grandson of Robert J. LaFortune and nephew of Bill LaFortune.

NOTE: G. T. Bynum is also the paternal great-great-grandson of R. N. Bynum, who served as the 2nd Mayor of Tulsa from 1899 to 1900.

== LaHoods ==
- Ray LaHood (born 1945), United States Secretary of Transportation 2009–13 and U.S. House Representative 1995–2009 from Illinois
  - Darin LaHood (born 1968), Illinois State Senator 2011–15, U.S. House Representative from Illinois 2015–present. Son of Ray LaHood.

== Laidleys ==
- John Laidley (1791–1863), delegate to the Virginia Constitutional Convention 1829 1830, Prosecuting Attorney of Cabell County, Virginia. Father of William S. Laidley.
  - William S. Laidley (1839–1917), West Virginia House Delegate 1872–73. Son of John Laidley.
  - George W. Summers (1804–1868), Virginia House Delegate 1830–32 1834–36, U.S. Representative from Virginia 1841–45, delegate to the Virginia Constitutional Convention 1850, candidate for Governor of Virginia 1851, Circuit Court Judge in Virginia 1852–58. Son-in-law of John Laidley.
    - John B. Laidley, West Virginia House Delegate 1885. Grandson of John Laidley.

== Lairds, Connors, and Doyles ==
- Robert Connor (1837–1896), Member of the Wisconsin State Assembly 1889. Republican. Father of William D. Connor.
  - William D. Connor (1864–1944), delegate to the Wisconsin Republican State Convention 1892 1894 1896 1902 1904, Lieutenant Governor of Wisconsin 1907–09. Father of Helen Connor Laird.
    - Helen Connor Laird (1888–1982), delegate to the Republican National Convention 1948. Daughter of William D. Connor.
    - Melvin R. Laird Sr. (1877–1946), Wisconsin State Senator 1941–46. Husband of Helen Connor Laird.
      - Melvin R. Laird (1922–2016), Wisconsin State Senator 1945–52, U.S. Representative from Wisconsin 1953–69, U.S. Secretary of Defense 1969–73. Son of Helen Connor Laird and Melvin R. Laird Sr.
        - James E. Doyle (born 1945), Dane County, Wisconsin District Attorney 1977–82; Attorney General of Wisconsin 1991–2003; Governor of Wisconsin 2003–11. Nephew by marriage of Melvin R. Laird.

NOTE: James E. Doyle is also the son of federal judge James Edward Doyle and Wisconsin Assemblywoman Ruth Bachhuber Doyle, both were founders of the modern Democratic Party in Wisconsin. Ruth Bachhuber Doyle's father, Frank E. Bachhuber, grandfather, Andrew Bachhuber, and great-grandfather, Max Bachhuber also served in the Wisconsin Assembly.

== Lamars ==
- Lucius Quintus Cincinnatus Lamar (1797–1834), Judge of the Georgia Superior Court. Brother of Mirabeau B. Lamar.
- Mirabeau B. Lamar (1798–1859), candidate for Georgia State Senator, withdrew nomination, candidate for U.S. Representative from Georgia 1833; Vice President of the Republic of Texas 1836–38; President of the Republic of Texas 1838–42; member of the Texas Legislature; U.S. Minister to Nicaragua 1858–59; U.S. Minister to Costa Rica 1858–59. Brother of Lucius Quinuts Cincinnatus Lamar.
  - Lucius Quintus Cincinnatus Lamar (1825–1893), Georgia State Representative 1853, U.S. Representative from Mississippi 1857–60 1873–77, U.S. Senator from Mississippi 1877–85, U.S. Secretary of the Interior 1885–88, Justice of the U.S. Supreme Court 1888–93. Nephew of Mirabeau B. Lamar.
  - Absalom Harris Chappell (1801–1878), member of the Georgia Legislature, U.S. Representative from Georgia 1843–45. Cousin of Lucius Quintus Cincinnatus Lamar.
    - William Bailey Lamar (1853–1928), Judge in Florida 1883–86, Florida State Representative 1887, Attorney General of Florida 1889–99, U.S. Representative from Florida 1903–09. Nephew of Lucius Quintus Cincinnatus Lamar.
    - Joseph Rucker Lamar (1857–1916), Justice of the U.S. Supreme Court 1910–16. Cousin of Lucius Quintus Cincinnatus Lamar.

== Lambs ==
- Thomas F. Lamb (1922–2015), Pennsylvania House of Representatives 1959–1966, Pennsylvania Senate 1969–1974.
  - Michael Lamb (born 1962), Controller of the City of Pittsburgh, 2008–present; candidate for Pennsylvania Auditor General in 2020. Son of Thomas F. Lamb, uncle of Conor Lamb.
    - Conor Lamb (born 1984), member of the United States House of Representatives from Pennsylvania's 18th congressional district, 2018–2023; Democratic primary candidate in the 2022 United States Senate election in Pennsylvania. Grandson of Thomas F. Lamb, nephew of Michael Lamb.

== Lambeths ==
- John Walter Lambeth (1868–1934), Mayor of Thomasville, North Carolina 1901–07. Father of Walter Lambeth.
  - Walter Lambeth (1896–1961), North Carolina State Senator 1921, Mayor of Thomasville, North Carolina 1925; U.S. Representative from North Carolina 1931–39; delegate to the Democratic National Convention 1944. Son of John Walter Lambeth.

== Lances ==
- Wesley Lance (1908–2007), New Jersey Assemblyman 1937–41, New Jersey State Senator 1942–62
  - Leonard Lance (born 1952), New Jersey Assemblyman 1991–2002, New Jersey State Senator 2002–09, U.S. Representative from New Jersey 2009–19. Son of Wesley Lance.

== Landers ==
- Franklin Landers (1825–1901), Indiana State Senator 1860, U.S. Representative from Indiana 1875–77, candidate for Governor of Indiana 1880. Father of Julia E. Landers.
  - Julia E. Landers (1872–1953), Democratic National Committeewoman 1920. Daughter of Franklin Landers.

== Landis ==
- Charles B. Landis (1858–1922), U.S. Representative from Indiana 1897–1909. Brother of Kenesaw Mountain Landis and Frederick Landis.
- Kenesaw Mountain Landis (1866–1944), Federal Judge in Illinois 1905–22. Brother of Charles B. Landis and Frederick Landis.
- Frederick Landis (1872–1934), U.S. Representative from Indiana 1903–07, delegate to the Progressive Party National Convention 1912, candidate for Governor of Indiana 1912, candidate for Republican nomination for Governor of Indiana 1928. Brother of Charles B. Landis and Kenesaw Mountain Landis.

== Landons ==
- Alf Landon (1887–1987), Governor of Kansas 1933–37; Republican candidate for president, 1936.
  - Nancy Landon Kassebaum (born 1932), U.S. Senator from Kansas 1978–97. Daughter of Alf Landon. Married to former United States Senator Howard Baker.
    - William Kassebaum (born 1962) Kansas House of Representatives 2002–04. Son of Nancy Landon Kassebaum.

== Landrieus ==
- Moon Landrieu (born 1930), Mayor of New Orleans, Louisiana, 1970–78; United States Secretary of Housing and Urban Development under Jimmy Carter, 1977–80; judge, Louisiana 4th Circuit Court of Appeals, 1991–2000.
  - Mary Landrieu (born 1955), U.S. Senator from Louisiana, 1997–2015; daughter of Moon Landrieu.
  - Mitch Landrieu (born 1960), Mayor of New Orleans, 2010–18; Lieutenant Governor of Louisiana, 2004–10; son of Moon Landrieu

== Lanes ==
- Joel Lane (1740–1795), North Carolina State Senator 1782–94, delegate to the North Carolina Constitutional Convention 1788 1789. Granduncle of Joseph Lane.
  - Joseph Lane (1801–1881), Territorial Governor of Oregon, 1948–1850, 1853; Delegate to the U.S. House of Representatives from Oregon Territory, 1851–59; U.S. Senator from Oregon, 1859–61; Southern Democratic vice presidential nominee, 1860.
  - David L. Swain (1801–1868), Governor of North Carolina 1832–35. Grandnephew of Joel Lane.
    - Lafayette Lane (1842–1896), U.S. Representative from Oregon, 1875–77; son of Joseph Lane.
    - Lafayette F. Mosher (1824–1890), Justice of the Oregon Supreme Court 1872–74. Son-in-law of Joseph Lane.
      - James L. Robinson (1838–1887), North Carolina State Representative, Lieutenant Governor of North Carolina 1881–84. Grandnephew of David L. Swain.
      - Harry Lane (1855–1917), Mayor of Portland, Oregon, 1905–09; U.S. Senator from Oregon, 1913–17; grandson of Joseph Lane, nephew of Lafayette Lane.

NOTE: Joseph Lane was also first cousin by marriage of U.S. Senator Walter T. Colquitt.

== Lanes of Indiana ==
- Henry S. Lane (1811–1881), Indiana State Senator 1837, Indiana State Representative 1838–39, U.S. Representative 1840–43, Governor of Indiana 1861, U.S. Senator from Indiana 1861–67. Brother of Higgins Lane.
- Higgins Lane (1812–1877), Indiana State Representative 1849–50 1861 1865. Brother of Henry S. Lane.
  - Edwin T. Lane (1851–1???), Indiana State Representative 1877. Son of Higgins Lane.

== Lanes of Indiana and Kansas ==
- Amos Lane (1778–1849), Indiana State Representative, U.S. Representative from Indiana 1833–37. Father of George W. Lane and James H. Lane.
  - George W. Lane (1812–1891), Indiana State Representative 1847 1856. Son of Amos Lane.
  - James H. Lane (1814–1866), U.S. Representative from Indiana 1853–55, U.S. Senator from Kansas 1861–66. Son of Amos Lane.

NOTE: James H. Lane was also grandson-in-law of Continental Congressional Delegate Arthur St. Clair.

== Lanes of Maryland ==
- William Preston Lane Jr. (1892–1967), Attorney General of Maryland 1930–34, Democratic National Committeeman 1940–50, delegate to the Democratic National Convention 1940 1944 1948, Governor of Maryland 1947–51. Relative of LeRoy Preston.
- LeRoy Lane (1915–1987), Maryland House Delegate 1948–52, Maryland State Senator 1952–56. Relative of William Preston Lane Jr.

== Lanes of North Carolina ==
- Joel Lane (1740–1795), member of the North Carolina Legislature, North Carolina State Senator 1782–94, delegate to the North Carolina Constitutional Convention 1788 1789. Granduncle of Joseph Lane and David Lowry Swain.
  - Joseph Lane (1801–1881), Indiana State Representative 1822–23 1830–33 1838–39, Indiana State Senator 1839–40 1844–46, Governor of Oregon Territory 1849–50 1853, U.S. Congressional Delegate from Oregon Territory 1851–59, candidate for Democratic nomination for President of the United States 1852, U.S. Senator from Oregon 1859–61, candidate for Vice President of the United States 1860, candidate for Oregon State Senate 1880. Grandnephew of Joel Lane.
  - David Lowry Swain (1801–1868), Governor of North Carolina 1832–35. Grandnephew of Joel Lane.
    - La Fayette Lane (1842–1896), Oregon State Representative 1864, U.S. Representative from Oregon 1875–77. Son of Joseph Lane.
    - Lafayette Mosher (1824–1890), member of the Oregon Legislature, Justice of the Oregon Supreme Court 1872–74. Son-in-law of Joseph Lane.
      - Harry Lane (1855–1917), Mayor of Portland, Oregon 1905–09; U.S. Senator from Oregon 1913–17. Grandson of Joseph Lane.
      - James L. Robinson (1838–1887), North Carolina State Representative, Lieutenant Governor of North Carolina 1881–84. Grandnephew of David Lowry Swain.

NOTE: Joseph Lane was also first cousin by marriage of U.S. Senator Walter T. Colquitt.

== Langdons ==
- Woodbury Langdon (1739–1805), New Hampshire State Representative 1778–79, Delegate to the Continental Congress from New Hampshire 1779, New Hampshire Executive Councilman 1781–84, Justice of the New Hampshire Superior Court 1782–83 1786–91. Brother of John Langdon.
- John Langdon (1741–1819), member of the New Hampshire Committee of Correspondence, Delegate to the Continental Congress from New Hampshire 1775–76 1787, delegate to the Philadelphia Convention, Governor of New Hampshire 1785–86 1788–89 1805–09 1810–12, U.S. Senator from New Hampshire 1789–1901, New Hampshire State Representative 1801–05. Brother of Woodbury Langdon.

== Langers and Fords ==
- Frank J. Langer (1849–1936), member of the North Dakota Legislature. Father of William Langer.
  - William Langer (1886–1959), State Attorney of Morton County, North Dakota 1914–16; Attorney General of North Dakota 1916–20; candidate for Governor of North Dakota 1920; Governor of North Dakota 1933–34 1937–39; candidate for Republican nomination for U.S. Senate from North Dakota 1938; U.S. Senator from North Dakota 1941–59. Son of Frank J. Langer.
    - Morgan Ford (1911–1992), Judge of the U.S. Court of Customs. Nephew of William Langer.

== Lanhams ==
- S.W.T. Lanham (1846–1908), U.S. Representative from Texas 1883–93 1897–1903, Governor of Texas 1903–07. Father of Fritz G. Lanham.
  - Fritz G. Lanham (1880–1965), U.S. Representative from Texas 1919–47. Son of S.W.T. Lanham.

== Lansings ==
- John Lansing Jr. (1754–1829), New York Assemblyman 1780–84 1785–86 1788–89, Delegate to the Continental Congress from New York 1785, Mayor of Albany, New York 1786–90; Justice of the New York Supreme Court 1790–98; Chief Justice of the New York Supreme Court 1798–1801; Chancellor of New York 1801–14. Uncle of Gerrit Y. Lansing.
  - Gerrit Y. Lansing (1783–1862), Probate Court Judge in New York 1816–23, U.S. Representative from New York 1831–37. Nephew of John Lansing Jr.

== Lantoses and Swetts ==
- Tom Lantos (1928–2008), Democratic Congressman from California 1981–2008.
  - Katrina Swett (born 1955), daughter of Tom Lantos, Democratic nominee for New Hampshire's 2nd congressional district in 2002 and candidate for Senate nomination in 2008.
  - Richard Swett (born 1957), husband of Katrina, Democratic Congressman from NH's 2nd district 1991–95 and Senate nominee for Senate in 1996.

== Larneds and Williams ==
- Charles Larned (17??–1834), Attorney General of Michigan Territory 1814. Father-in-law of Alpheus S. Williams.
  - Alpheus S. Williams (1810–1878), Probate Court Judge in Michigan 1839, Recorder's Court Judge in Michigan 1842, candidate for Governor of Michigan 1866, U.S. Minister to Salvador 1866–69, U.S. Representative from Michigan 1875–78. Son-in-law of Charles Larned.

== Larrabees and Loves ==
- William Larrabee (1832–1912), Iowa State Senator 1868–1886, Governor of Iowa 1886–90. Father of William Larrabee Jr. and Frederic Larrabee. Father-in-law of Don Lathrop Love.
  - William Larrabee Jr. (1870–1933), Iowa state representative 1902–04, 1909–15. Son of William Larrabee. Brother of Frederic Larrabee.
  - Frederic Larrabee (1873–1959), Iowa state senator 1909-15. Son of William Larrabee. Brother of William Larrabee Jr.
  - Don Lathrop Love (1863–1940), Mayor of Lincoln, Nebraska 1909–11 1929–31. Son-in-law of William Larrabee.

== Lassiters and Rives ==
- Francis E. Rives (1792–1861), member of the Virginia Legislature, U.S. Representative from Virginia 1837–41. Great-granduncle of Francis R. Lassiter.
  - Francis R. Lassiter (1866–1909), U.S. Representative from Virginia 1900–03 1907–09. Great-grandnephew of Francis E. Rives.
  - Charles T. Lassiter (1861–1928), Virginia State Senator, delegate to the Democratic National Convention 1924. Brother of Francis R. Lassiter.

== Latimers ==
- James Latimer Sr. (1719–1807), Delaware Assemblyman 1778–79. Father of Henry Latimer and George Latimer.
  - Henry Latimer (1752–1819), Delegate to the Continental Congress from Delaware 1784, Delaware Assemblyman 1787–91, U.S. Representative from Delaware 1794–95, U.S. Senator from Delaware 1795–1801, Pennsylvania State Representative. Son of James Latimer Sr..
  - George Latimer (1750–1825), Delaware Assemblyman 1779–82. Son of James Latimer Sr..

== LaTourettes ==
- Steve LaTourette (1954–2016), U.S. Representative from Ohio 1995–2013.
  - Sarah LaTourette (born 1983), Ohio State Representative 2015–19. Daughter of Steve LaTourette.

== Latrobes and Swanns ==
- Thomas Swann (1809–1883), Mayor of Baltimore, Maryland 1856–60; Governor of Maryland 1866–69; U.S. Representative from Maryland 1869–79. Father-in-law of Ferdinand Claiborne Latrobe.
  - Ferdinand Claiborne Latrobe (1833–1911), Maryland House Delegate 1868, Mayor of Baltimore, Maryland 1875–77 1878–81 1883–85 1887–89 1891–95. Son-in-law of Thomas Swann.

== Lattas ==
- Delbert L. Latta (1920–2016), Ohio State Senator 1953–58, U.S. Representative from Ohio 1959–89, delegate to the Republican National Convention 1968 1972 1976 1996. Father of Robert E. Latta.
  - Robert E. Latta (born 1956), candidate for Republican nomination for U.S. Representative from Ohio 1988, member of Wood County, Ohio Board of Commissioners 1991–97; Ohio State Senator 1997–2001; Ohio State Representative 2001–07; U.S. Representative from Ohio 2007–present. Son of Delbert L. Latta.

== Laurens and Pinckneys ==
- Henry Laurens (1724–1792), Vice President of South Carolina 1776–77, Delegate to the Continental Congress from South Carolina 1777–80. Father of John Laurens.
  - John Laurens (1754–1782), South Carolina State Representative 1779–80 1782. Son of Henry Laurens.
  - Charles Pinckney (1757–1824), South Carolina State Representative 1779–84 1786–89 1792–96 1805–06, Delegate to the Continental Congress from South Carolina 1785–87, Governor of South Carolina 1789–92 1796–98 1806–08, U.S. Senator from South Carolina 1798–1801, U.S. Minister to Spain 1801–04, U.S. Representative from South Carolina 1819–21. Son-in-law of Henry Laurens.
    - Henry Laurens Pinckney (1794–1863), South Carolina State Representative 1816–32, U.S. Representative from South Carolina 1833–37, Mayor of Charleston, South Carolina 1837–40; U.S. Collector of Customs of Charleston, South Carolina 1841–42. Son of Charles Pinckney.

NOTE: Charles Pinckney was also cousin of U.S. Minister Charles Cotesworth Pinckney and second cousin of U.S. Representative Thomas Pinckney.

== LaValles ==
- Kenneth LaValle (born 1939) Member of New York State Senate 1977–present, Cousin of Kevin LaValle and John Jay LaValle.
- John Jay LaValle (born 1941), Suffolk County, New York Republican Party Chairman 2009–Present, Town of Brookhaven, New York Supervisor 2002–05, Brookhaven Town Council 1998–2001, Potential candidate for Comptroller of Suffolk County 2014, Cousin of Kenneth LaValle, brother of Kevin LaValle
- Kevin LaValle, Councilman for the Town of Brookhaven, New York 2014–present, Chief of Staff for Suffolk Legislator Daniel Losquadro 2004–06, Aide to Suffolk Legislator Thomas Muratore until 2013, brother of John Jay LaValle, cousin of Kenneth LaValle.

== Laws and Learneds ==
- Richard Law (1733–1806), Delegate to the Continental Congress from Connecticut 1777 1781–82, Justice of the Connecticut Supreme Court 1784–89, Judge of the U.S. Federal Court from Connecticut 1789–1806. Father of Lyman Law.
- Amasa Learned (1750–1825), Connecticut State Representative, U.S. Representative from Connecticut 1791–95, delegate to the Connecticut Constitutional Convention 1818. Father-in-law of Lyman Law.
  - Lyman Law (1770–1840), Connecticut State Representative 1801–02 1806 1809–10 1819 1826, U.S. Representative from Connecticut 1811–17. Son of Richard Law.
    - John Law (1796–1873), Indiana State Representative 1824–25, Judge of Court of Land Claims 1855–57, U.S. Representative from Indiana 1861–65. Son of Lyman Law.

== Lawrences ==
- Samuel Lawrence (1773–1837), Judge of New York City Marine Court, New York Assemblyman 1808 1817–18 1820–21, Clerk of New York County, New York 1811–12; U.S. Representative from New York 1823–25. Brother of William T. Lawrence.
- William T. Lawrence (1788–1859), Justice of the Peace in New York 1838, U.S. Representative from New York 1847–49. Brother of Samuel Lawrence.

== Lawrences of Louisiana and New York ==
- Cornelius Van Wyck Lawrence (1791–1861), U.S. Representative from New York 1833–34, Mayor of New York City 1834–37, Collector of Customs of New York City 1845–49. Cousin of Effingham Lawrence.
  - Effingham Lawrence (1820–1878), Louisiana State Representative, U.S. Representative from Louisiana 1875. Cousin of Cornelius Van Wyck Lawrence.

== Lawrences of Pennsylvania ==
- Joseph Lawrence (1786–1842), Pennsylvania State Representative 1818–24 1834–36, U.S. Representative from Pennsylvania 1825–29 1841–42, Treasurer of Pennsylvania 1837. Father of George Van Eman Lawrence.
  - George Van Eman Lawrence (1818–1904), Pennsylvania State Representative 1844 1847 1858–59 1893–96, Pennsylvania State Senator 1849–51 1861–63 1875–76 1878, U.S. Representative from Pennsylvania 1865–69 1883–85, delegate to the Pennsylvania Constitutional Convention 1872. Son of Joseph Lawrence.

== Laxalts ==
- Paul Laxalt (1922–2018), Lieutenant Governor of Nevada 1963–67, Governor of Nevada 1967–71, U.S. Senator from Nevada 1974–87
  - Adam Laxalt (born 1978), Attorney General of Nevada 2015–2019. Grandson of Paul Laxalt and son of U.S. Senator Pete Domenici.

== Laytons ==
- Caleb R. Layton (1851–1930), Secretary of the Sussex County, Delaware Republican Committee 1876–88; Chairman of the Sussex County, Delaware Republican Committee 1896–1901; delegate to the Republican National Convention 1896 1900 1904; Delaware Secretary of State 1901–05; Delaware Progressive Republican Party Committeeman 1912–18; U.S. Representative from Delaware 1919–23. Father of John D. Layton.
  - Daniel J. Layton (1879–1960), Attorney General of Delaware 1932–33, Chief Justice of the Delaware Supreme Court 1933–45. Son of Caleb R. Layton.

== Leas ==
- Luke Lea (1783–1851), U.S. Representative from Tennessee 1833–37, Tennessee Secretary of State 1835–39. Brother of Pryor Lea.
- Pryor Lea (1794–1879), U.S. Representative from Tennessee 1827–31. Brother of Luke Lea.
  - Luke Lea (1879–1945), U.S. Senator from Tennessee 1911–17, delegate to the Democratic National Convention 1912. Great-grandson of Luke Lea.

== Leas and Phelps ==
- Preston Lea (1841–1916), Governor of Delaware 1905–09, delegate to the Republican National Convention 1908. Father-in-law of Sheffield Phelps.
  - Sheffield Phelps (1867–1902), delegate to the Republican National Convention 1900. Son-in-law of Preston Lea.
    - Phelps Phelps (1897–1981), New York Assemblyman 1924–28 1937–38, delegate to the Republican National Convention 1932, delegate to the Democratic National Convention 1936 1956 1960, New York State Senator 1939–42, Governor of American Samoa 1951–52, U.S. Ambassador to the Dominican Republic 1952–53, delegate to the New Jersey Constitutional Convention 1966. Nephew of Sheffield Phelps.

NOTE: Preston Lea was also third cousin once removed of U.S. Senator Joseph Rodman West and second cousin once removed of Delaware Assemblyman Charles Corbit and Minnesota State Representative William Webb Jr. Sheffield Phelps was also son of U.S. Representative William Walter Phelps.

== Leaches of Louisiana ==
- Anthony Claude "Buddy" Leach (born 1934), member of the Louisiana House of Representatives 1968–79, 1984–88; member of the United States House of Representatives from Louisiana's 4th congressional district, 1979–81; chairman of the Louisiana Democratic Party 2010–12, brother of Carolyn Leach Huntoon
- Carolyn Leach Huntoon (born 1940), first woman director of the Johnson Space Center in Houston, sister of Claude "Buddy" Leach

== Leaches of New England ==
- Edward G. Leach (1849–1928), New Hampshire Republican Executive Committeeman 1880–1909, New Hampshire State Representative 1893–95, New Hampshire State Senator 1901–02, New Hampshire Governor's Councilman 1905–06. Father of Robert M. Leach.
  - Robert M. Leach (1879–1952), U.S. Representative from Massachusetts 1924–25, delegate to the Republican National Convention 1932. Son of Edward G. Leach.

== Leaders ==
- Guy Leader (1887–1978), Pennsylvania State Senator. Father of George M. Leader.
  - George M. Leader (1918–2013), Chairman of the York County, Pennsylvania Democratic Party 1946–50; Pennsylvania State Senator 1950–54; candidate for Treasurer of Pennsylvania 1952; Governor of Pennsylvania 1955–59; delegate to the Democratic National Convention 1856 1964 1972; candidate for U.S. Senate from Pennsylvania 1958. Son of Guy Leader.

== LeBlancs, Reeses, and the Couhigs ==
- Samuel A. LeBlanc I (1886–1955), member of the Louisiana House of Representatives from Assumption Parish 1912–16, state district court judge 1920–29, state appeals court judge, 1929–49, justice of the Louisiana Supreme Court 1949–54, grandfather of Sam A. LeBlanc III
  - George W. Reese Jr. (1923–1998), New Orleans lawyer, former Republican national committeeman from Louisiana, and the party's nominee for the U.S. Senate against Allen J. Ellender in 1960, uncle of Sam A. LeBlanc III and Rob Couhig
    - Sam A. LeBlanc III (born 1938), Democratic member of the Louisiana House from Jefferson and Orleans parishes 1972–80; attorney in New Orleans, temporary federal appeals court judge; retired to St. Francisville, Louisiana, grandson of Samuel A. LeBlanc I, half-brother of Rob Couhig and Kevin H. Couhig, and nephew of George W. Reese Jr.
    - Rob Couhig (born 1949), Republican political activist, businessman, and lawyer in New Orleans, half-brother of Sam A. LeBlanc III, brother of Kevin Couhig, and nephew of George W. Reese Jr.
    - Kevin H. Couhig (born 1951), first president of West Feliciana Parish, Louisiana, brother of Rob Couhig, half-brother of Sam A. LeBlanc III, nephew of George W. Reese Jr.

== Leddys and Donovans ==
- Bernard Joseph Leddy (1910–1972), Judge of the United States District Court for the District of Vermont 1966–72.
  - James P. Leddy (born 1942), Vermont State Senator 1998–2006. Son of Bernard Joseph Leddy.
  - Johannah Leddy Donovan (born 1944) Vermont State Representative 2001–present. Daughter of Bernard Joseph Leddy.
    - T. J. Donovan (born 1974), State's Attorney of Chittenden County 2007–17, Attorney General of Vermont 2017–present. Son of Johannah Leddy Donovan.

== Lees ==
See Lee family

== Lees of Maryland ==
- Philip Corbin Lee (1681-1744), born in Virginia and of the Lee family, served in both houses of the Maryland General Assembly and was the grandfather of Thomas Sim Lee
- Richard Lee III (Maryland Squire) (1706-1787), served in the Maryland General Assembly and as acting Governor at the start of the Revolutionary War, built Blenheim plantation house, eldest son of Philip Corbin Lee and uncle of Thomas Sim Lee
- Thomas Sim Lee (1745–1819), Governor of Maryland 1779–83 1792–94, Delegate to the Confederation Congress from Maryland 1783, Maryland House Delegate 1787. Father of John Lee.
  - John Lee (1788–1871), U.S. Representative from Maryland 1823–25, Maryland House Delegate, Maryland State Senator. Son of Thomas Sim Lee.
    - John Lee Carroll (1830–1911), Maryland State Senator 1868–74, Governor of Maryland 1876–80. Great-great-grandson of Thomas Sim Lee.

NOTE: Thomas Sim Lee was also first cousin of U.S. Senator Richard Potts. John Lee Carroll was also great-grandson of U.S. Senator Charles Carroll of Carrollton.

== Lees and Eubanks of Louisiana ==
- Swords Lee (1859–1929), descendant of Robert E. Lee of Virginia; timber owner, state representative for Grant Parish, Louisiana 1904–08, grandfather of James Rowland Lee and cousin by marriage to Huey P. Long Jr.
  - James Rowland Eubank (1914–1952), state representative for Rapides Parish, Louisiana, 1952, died of heart attack in first year in the position, attorney, grandson of Swords Lee

== Lees of Texas ==
- Sheila Jackson Lee (1950–2024), member of the Houston City Council (1990–1995) and Member of the U.S. House of Representatives (1995 –2024).
  - Erica Lee Carter (1980–), Member of the U.S. House of Representatives (2024-2025), daughter of Sheila Jackson Lee.

== LeFevers ==
- Jacob LeFever (1830–1905), Supervisor of New Paltz, New York 1861–62; New York Assemblyman 1863–65 1867; delegate to the Republican National Convention 1888; U.S. Representative from New York 1893–97. Father of Frank J. LeFevre.
  - Frank J. LeFevre (1874–1941), New York State Senator 1902, U.S. Representative from New York 1905–07. Son of Jacob LeFever.
    - Jay LeFevre (1893–1970), U.S. Representative from New York 1943–51. 2nd cousin twice removed of Jacob LeFever and 3rd cousin once removed of Frank J. LeFevre.

== Lefflers ==
- Isaac Leffler (1788–1866), Virginia House Delegate 1817–19 1823–27 1832–33, member of the Virginia Board of Public Works 1827, U.S. Representative from Virginia 1827–29, member of the Wisconsin Territory Legislature 1836–37, Iowa Territory Representative 1841, U.S. Marshall of Iowa 1844–45, Receiver of Public Moneys of Chariton, Iowa 1852–53. Brother of Shepherd Leffler.
- Shepherd Leffler (1811–1879), Iowa Territory Representative 1839 1841, Iowa Territory Councilman 1841–43 1845, delegate to the Iowa Territory Constitutional Convention 1844 1846, U.S. Representative from Iowa 1846–51, candidate for Governor of Iowa 1875. Brother of Isaac Leffler.

== Lehlbachs ==
- Herman Lehlbach (1845–1904), New Jersey Assemblyman 1884–86, U.S. Representative from New Jersey 1885–91. Uncle of Frederick R. Lehlbach.
  - Frederick R. Lehlbach (1876–1937), U.S. Representative from New Jersey 1915–37. Nephew of Herman Lehlbach.

== Lehmans ==
- Irving Lehman (1876–1945), Justice of the New York Supreme Court 1900–24, Judge of the New York Court of Appeals 1924–39, Chief Judge of the New York Court of Appeals 1940–45. Brother of Herbert H. Lehman.
- Herbert H. Lehman (1878–1963), delegate to the Democratic National Convention 1928 1932 1936 1940 1948 1952 1956 1960, Lieutenant Governor of New York 1929–32, Governor of New York 1933–42, candidate for U.S. Senate from New York 1946, U.S. Senator from New York 1949–57. Brother of Irving Lehman.
  - Robert M. Morgenthau (1919–2019), U.S. Attorney in New York 1961–62 1962–69, candidate for Governor of New York 1962, District Attorney of New York County, New York. Grandnephew of Herbert H. Lehman.
  - Orin Lehman (1920–2008), delegate to the Democratic National Convention 1964, candidate for U.S. Representative from New York 1966. Grandnephew of Herbert H. Lehman.
  - John Langeloth Loeb Jr. (born 1930), U.S. Ambassador to Denmark 1981–83. Grandnephew of Hebert H. Lehman.

NOTE: Irving Lehman was also brother-in-law of New York State Senator Nathan Straus Jr. Robert M. Morgenthau is also grandson of U.S. Ambassador Henry Morgenthau Sr. and son of U.S. Secretary of the Treasury Henry Morgenthau Jr. Orin Lehman was also nephew by marriage of Rhode Island Governor William Henry Vanderbilt III.

== Lenahans and O'Connells ==
- John Thomas Lenahan (1952–1920), delegate to the Democratic National Convention 1892 1896, U.S. Representative from Pennsylvania 1907–09. Father-in-law of Joseph F. O'Connell.
  - Joseph F. O'Connell (1872–1942), U.S. Representative from Massachusetts 1907–11, delegate to the Democratic National Convention 1912 1920, delegate to the Massachusetts Constitutional Convention 1917. Son-in-law of John Thomas Lenahan.

== Lenroots ==
- Irvine L. Lenroot (1869–1949), Wisconsin Assemblyman 1901–07, U.S. Representative from Wisconsin 1909–18, U.S. Senator from Wisconsin 1918–27, Judge of the U.S. Court of Customs and Patents Appeals 1929–41. Uncle of Arthur A. Lenroot Jr.
  - Arthur Lenroot Jr. (1912–1997), Wisconsin State Senator, candidate for Wisconsin State Senate 1954, delegate to the Republican National Convention 1948. Nephew of Irvine L. Lenroot.

== Lesinskis ==
- John Lesinski Sr. (1885–1950), delegate to the Democratic National Convention 1936 1940 1944, delegate to the Michigan Democratic Convention 1936 1940 1944, U.S. Representative from Michigan 1933–50. Father of John Lesinski Jr.
  - John Lesinski Jr. (1914–2005), U.S. Representative from Michigan 1951–65, member of the Board of Commissioners of Wayne County, Michigan 1968–73. Son of John Lesinski Sr.

== The Letlows ==
- Luke Letlow
- Julia Letlow

both were elected members of the U.S. House of Representatives from Louisiana's 5th district

== Levis ==
- Edward H. Levi (1911–2000), U.S. Attorney General 1975–77. Father of David F. Levi.
  - David F. Levi (born 1951), U.S. Attorney for Eastern District of California 1986–90, Judge of U.S. District Court for Eastern District of California 1990–2003, Chief Judge of U.S. District Court for the Eastern District of California 2003–07. Son of Edward H. Levi.

== Levins ==
- Theodore Levin (1897–1970), District Judge, United States District Court for the Eastern District of Michigan (1946–70; Chief Judge 1959–67); father of Charles and Joseph.
  - Charles Levin (1926–2020), justice of Michigan State Supreme Court, 1973–96; son of Theodore.
  - Helene White (born 1954), Judge of the United States Court of Appeals for the Sixth Circuit 2008–present. Ex-wife of Charles Levin.
  - Mimi Levin Lieber (1928-2021), member New York State Board of Regents, 1984-1996, daughter of Theodore.
    - Janno Lieber (born 1961), chairman and CEO of New York Metropolitain Transportation Authority, 2021–present, son of Mimi.
  - Joseph Levin, candidate for U.S. representative from Michigan; son of Theodore and brother of Charles.
- Saul Levin (1898–1960), Honorary Consul of Honduras; brother of Theodore.
  - Carl Levin (1934–2021), U.S. senator from Michigan, 1979–2015; son of Saul and brother of Sander.
  - Sander M. Levin (born 1931), U.S. representative from Michigan, 1983–2019; son of Saul and brother of Carl.
    - Andy Levin (born 1960), U.S. representative from Michigan, 2019–2023; sought election to Michigan Senate, 2006; son of Sander and nephew of Carl.

== Levitas ==
- Elliott H. Levitas (born 1930), Georgia State Representative 1966–75, U.S. Representative from Georgia 1975–85. Father of Kevin Levitas.
  - Kevin Levitas, Georgia State Representative 2007–11. Son of Elliott H. Levitas.

== Lewises ==
- Andrew L. Lewis Jr. (1931–2016), candidate for Governor of Pennsylvania 1968 1972 1974 1980, delegate to the Republican National Convention 1976, U.S. Secretary of Transportation 1981–83. Father of Andrew Lewis, IV.
  - Andrew Lewis, IV, Commissioner of Haverford, Pennsylvania 2004–07; Delaware County, Pennsylvania Councilman 2007–present. Son of Andrew L. Lewis Jr..

== Lewises of New York ==
- Francis Lewis (1713–1803), Delegate to the Continental Congress from New York 1775. Father of Morgan Lewis.
  - Morgan Lewis (1754–1844), New York Assemblyman 1789–90 1791–92, Attorney General of New York 1791–92, Justice of the New York Supreme Court 1792–1801, Governor of New York 1804–07, New York State Senator 1810–14. Son of Francis Lewis.

NOTE: Morgan Lewis was also son-in-law of New York Colony Assemblyman Robert Livingston, grandson-in-law of New York Colony Assemblyman Robert Livingston, and brother-in-law of U.S. Secretary of Foreign Affairs Robert Livingston, U.S. Secretary of State Edward Livingston, and U.S. Secretary of War John Armstrong Jr.

== Lewises of Virginia ==
- John F. Lewis (1818–1895), Lieutenant Governor of Virginia 1869–70 1882, U.S. Senator from Virginia 1870–75. Brother of Lunsford L. Lewis.
- Lunsford L. Lewis (1846–1920), Attorney of Culpeper County, Virginia 1870–74; U.S. Attorney in Virginia 1874–82 1902–05 1905–12; Justice of the Virginia Supreme Court 1882–95. Brother of John F. Lewis.

NOTE: Lunsford L. Lewis was also son-in-law of U.S. Representative John Botts.

== Lichts ==
- Frank Licht (1916–1987), Rhode Island State Senator 1949–56, Rhode Island Superior Court Judge 1956–68, Governor of Rhode Island 1969–73. Uncle of Richard Licht.
  - Richard A. Licht (born 1948), Rhode Island State Senator 1975–84, Lieutenant Governor of Rhode Island 1985–89, candidate for U.S. Senate from Rhode Island 1988, delegate to the Democratic National Convention 2004, Judge of Rhode Island Superior Court since 2014. Nephew of Frank Licht.

== Lincolns of Illinois ==
- Abraham Lincoln (1809–1865), 16th President of the United States, 1861–65; Candidate for U.S. Senate from Illinois, 1854 and 1858; U.S. Representative from Illinois, 1847–49; member, Illinois House of Representatives 1834-42.
  - Robert Todd Lincoln (1843–1926), South Chicago Board of Supervisors, 1876–77; U.S. Secretary of War, 1881–85; U.S. Minister to the United Kingdom, 1889–93. Son of Abraham Lincoln.

== Lincolns of New England ==
- Levi Lincoln Sr. (1749–1820), Probate Judge of Worcester County, Massachusetts; Massachusetts State Representative 1796; Massachusetts State Senator 1797; U.S. Representative from Massachusetts 1800–01; Attorney General of the United States 1801–05; acting U.S. Secretary of State 1801; Lieutenant Governor of Massachusetts 1807–09; acting Governor of Massachusetts 1808–09. Father of Levi Lincoln Jr. and Enoch Lincoln.
  - Levi Lincoln Jr. (1782–1868), Lieutenant Governor of Massachusetts 1823–24, Governor of Massachusetts 1825–34, U.S. Representative from Massachusetts 1834–41. Son of Levi Lincoln Sr.
  - Enoch Lincoln (1788–1829), U.S. District Attorney in Massachusetts 1815–18, U.S. Representative from Massachusetts 1818–21, U.S. Representative from Maine 1821–26, Governor of Maine 1827–29. Son of Levi Lincoln Sr.
    - Frederick Robie (1822–1912), Maine State Senator 1866–67, Maine State Representative 1868–78, Maine Governor's Executive Councilman 1880 1881–82, Governor of Maine 1883–87. Grandnephew of Levi Lincoln Jr. and Enoch Lincoln.
      - Frederick Robie (1893–1964), Secretary of State of Maine 1937–42. Grandson of Frederick Robie.

NOTE: Levi Lincoln Sr. was also distantly related to U.S. President Abraham Lincoln.

== Lindberghs and Lodges ==
- John C. Lodge (1862–1950), Michigan State Representative 1909–10, Mayor of Detroit, Michigan 1922–23 1924 1927–29. Uncle by marriage of Charles August Lindbergh.
  - Charles August Lindbergh (1859–1924), U.S. Representative from Minnesota 1907–17, candidate for the Republican nomination for U.S. Senate from Minnesota 1916, candidate for Governor of Minnesota 1918, candidate for U.S. Representative from Minnesota 1920. Nephew by marriage of John C. Lodge.
    - Charles Lindbergh (1902–1974) American aviator, spokesman for anti-war America First Committee. Son of Charles August Lindbergh.

== Lindsays and Rudds ==
- George H. Lindsay (1837–1916), New York Assemblyman 1882–86, Coroner of Kings County, New York 1886–92; U.S. Representative from New York 1901–13. Father of George W. Lindsay.
  - George W. Lindsay (1865–1938), New York Democratic Committeeman, New York Assemblyman, U.S. Representative from New York 1923–35. Son of George H. Lindsay.
  - Stephen A. Rudd (1874–1936), U.S. Representative from New York 1931–36. Son-in-law of George H. Lindsay.
    - Roy H. Rudd, (1906–1997) New York Assemblyman 1937–44, New York State Senator 1945–46. Son of Stephen A. Rudd.

NOTE: Stephen A. Rudd was also son of New York Assemblyman Robert J. Rudd.

== Lindsays and Winstons ==
- John Anthony Winston (1912–1871), member of the Alabama Legislature 1840, Alabama State Senator 1845, Governor of Alabama 1853–57, delegate to the Democratic National Convention 1860. Brother-in-law of Robert B. Lindsay.
- Robert B. Lindsay (1824–1902), Alabama State Representative 1853, Alabama State Senator 1857 1866, Governor of Alabama 1870–72. Brother-in-law of John Anthony Winston.

== Lipinskis ==
- William O. Lipinski (born 1937), Illinois Democratic Committeeman, Chicago, Illinois Alderman 1975–83; U.S. Representative from Illinois 1983–2005. Husband of Rose Marie Lipinski.
- Rose Marie Lipinski, delegate to the Democratic National Convention 1996 2004. Wife of William O. Lipinski.
  - Daniel W. Lipinski (born 1966), U.S. Representative from Illinois 2005–2021. Son of William O. Lipinski and Rose Marie Lipinski.

== Lippitts ==
- Henry Lippitt (1818–1891), Governor of Rhode Island 1875–77. Father of Charles W. Lippitt and Henry F. Lippitt.
  - Charles W. Lippitt (1846–1924), Governor of Rhode Island 1895–97. Son of Henry Lippitt.
  - Henry F. Lippitt (1856–1933), U.S. Senator from Rhode Island 1911–17, delegate to the Republican National Convention 1912. Son of Henry Lippitt.
  - John Chafee (1922–1999), Governor of Rhode Island 1963–1969, United States Secretary of the Navy 1969–1972, United States Senator 1976–1999.
  - Lincoln Chafee (born 1953), Mayor of Warwick 1993–1999, United States Senator 1999–2007, Governor of Rhode Island 2011–2015. Son of John Chafee.

== Listers ==
- Ernest Lister (1870–1919), candidate for U.S. Representative from Washington 1909, Governor of Washington 1913–19. Husband of Alma Lister.
- Alma Lister, delegate to the Democratic National Convention 1920. Wife of Ernest Lister.
  - Edna Lister, candidate for Washington Secretary of State 1948. Niece of Ernest Lister and Alma Lister.

== Livermores ==
- Samuel Livermore (1732–1803), member of the New Hampshire General Court 1768–69, Attorney General of New Hampshire 1769–74, New Hampshire State Attorney, Delegate to the Continental Congress from New Hampshire 1780–82 1785–86, Chief Justice of the New Hampshire Superior Court 1782–89, U.S. Representative from New Hampshire 1789–93, President of the New Hampshire Constitutional Convention 1791 1792, U.S. Senator from New Hampshire 1793–1801. Father of Edward St. Loe Livermore and Arthur Livermore.
  - Edward St. Loe Livermore (1762–1832), U.S. District Attorney in New Hampshire 1789–97, Solicitor of Rockingham County, New Hampshire 1791–93; Justice of the New Hampshire Supreme Court 1797–99; U.S. Representative from Massachusetts 1807–11. Son of Samuel Livermore.
  - Arthur Livermore (1766–1853), New Hampshire State Representative 1794–95, Solicitor of Rockingham County, New Hampshire 1796–98; Justice of the New Hampshire Superior Court 1798–1809; Chief Justice of the New Hampshire Superior Court 1809–13; Justice of the New Hampshire Supreme Court 1813–16; U.S. Representative from New Hampshire 1817–21 1823–25; New Hampshire State Senator 1821–22; Probate Judge in Grafton County, New Hampshire 1822–23; Chief Justice of the Court of Common Pleas in New Hampshire 1825–32. Son of Samuel Livermore.
  - Norman Banks Livermore Jr. (1911–2006), California Secretary of Resources under Governor Ronald Reagan, 1966–74, giving him one of the best environmental records of any governor during those years. Notable achievements included preserving uninterrupted wilderness in the Sierra Nevada, from Mount Whitney to Yosemite.

== Lloyds ==
- Edward Lloyd, Governor of Maryland Colony 1709–14. Grandfather of Edward Lloyd.
  - Edward Lloyd (1744–1796), Delegate to the Continental Congress from Maryland 1783–84. Grandson of Edward Lloyd.
    - Edward Lloyd (1779–1834), Maryland House Delegate 1800–05, U.S. Representative from Maryland 1807–09, Governor of Maryland 1809–11, Maryland State Senator 1811–15 1826–31, U.S. Senator from Maryland 1819–26. Son of Edward Lloyd.
      - Henry Lloyd (1852–1920), Maryland State Senator 1882–84, Governor of Maryland 1885–88, Maryland Circuit Court Judge 1892–1908. Grandson of Edward Lloyd.

NOTE: Henry Lloyd was also great-grandson of U.S. Senator John Henry.

== Lockes ==
- John Locke (1764–1855), Massachusetts State Representative 1804, delegate to the Massachusetts Constitutional Convention 1820, U.S. Representative from Massachusetts 1823–29, Massachusetts State Senator 1830. Third cousin once removed of Charles Locke.
  - Charles Locke (1811–1881), Michigan State Representative 1867–68. Third cousin once removed of John Locke.
    - J.B. Locke (1832–1899), Minnesota State Representative 1865. First cousin twice removed of John Locke.
    - Otis Taft Locke (1844–1916), delegate to the Republican National Convention 1868. Third cousin twice removed of John Locke.
    - David G. Locke (1860–1944), Michigan State Representative 1921–22. Third cousin twice removed of John Locke.
      - Leon Locke(1869–1934), Louisiana State Representative 1908–16, Mayor of Lake Charles, Louisiana 1929–33. First cousin thrice removed of John Locke.

== Lockes and Wingos ==
- Matthew Locke (1730–1801), Treasury Commissioner of North Carolina 1771, Rowan County, North Carolina Safety Committeeman; Rowan County, North Carolina Secrecy, Intelligence, and Observation Committeeman; Delegate to the Colonial Congress 1776; delegate to the North Carolina Constitutional Convention 1776 1789; member of the North Carolina House of Commons 1777–81 1783–92; North Carolina State Senator 1781–82; U.S. Representative from North Carolina 1793–99. Brother of Francis Locke, and an uncle of Francis Locke Jr.
  - Francis Locke Jr. (1776–1823), Judge of the North Carolina Supreme Court 1803–14, U.S. Senator from North Carolina 1814–15. Nephew of Matthew Locke.
    - Effiegene Locke Wingo (1883–1962), U.S. Representative from Arkansas 1930–33. Great-great-great-granddaughter of Matthew Locke.
    - Otis Wingo (1877–1930), Arkansas State Senator 1907–09, U.S. Representative from Arkansas 1913–30. Husband of Effiegene Locke Wingo.

== Lodges and Cabots ==
Also see The Davis and Lodges

The Cabots and Lodges were relatives by marriage to the Adams family and the Roosevelt family.

- George Cabot (1752–1823), U.S. Senator from Massachusetts 1791–96, appointed but declined to be first Secretary of the Navy. Great-grandfather of Henry Cabot Lodge.
  - Henry Cabot Lodge (1850–1924), U.S. Senator from Massachusetts 1893–1924. Great-grandson of George Cabot and grandfather of Henry Cabot Lodge Jr. and John Davis Lodge.
    - Henry Cabot Lodge Jr. (1902–1985), U.S. Senator from Massachusetts 1937–44 and 1947–53, U.S. Ambassador to the United Nations 1953–1960, U.S. Ambassador to South Vietnam 1963–64 and 1965–67, U.S. Ambassador to West Germany 1968–69, candidate for U.S. Vice President 1960. Grandson of Henry Cabot Lodge, brother of John Davis Lodge and father of George Cabot Lodge II.
      - George Cabot Lodge II (born 1927) candidate for U.S. Senator from Massachusetts 1962. Son of Henry Cabot Lodge Jr.
    - John Davis Lodge (1903–1985), U.S. Representative 1947–51, Governor of Connecticut 1951–55. Grandson of Henry Cabot Lodge and brother of Henry Cabot Lodge Jr.

NOTE: Henry Cabot Lodge was also grandson-in-law of U.S. Senator Elijah Hunt Mills. George Cabot Lodge was also grandson-in-law of U.S. Secretary of State Frederick T. Frelinghuysen. Henry Cabot Lodge Jr. was also great-great-grandson-in-law of U.S. Senator Jonathan Mason and brother-in-law of New Jersey Treasurer Archibald S. Alexander. George C. Lodge and John Davis Lodge were also nephews by marriage of U.S. Representative Augustus P. Gardner. John Davis Lodge was also brother-in-law of U.S. Consul General D. Chadwick Braggiotti.

== Lodges of Idaho ==
- Edward Lodge (born 1933), Judge of the Canyon County Probate Court 1963–65, Judge of the Third Judicial District of Idaho 1965–88, Bankruptcy Judge of the United States District Court for the District of Idaho 1988–89, Judge of the United States District Court for the District of Idaho 1989–2015.
- Patti Anne Lodge (born 1942), Idaho State Senator 2000–present. Wife of Edward Lodge.

== Logans ==
- James Logan (1674–1751), Mayor of Philadelphia, Pennsylvania 1722–23; Chief Justice of Pennsylvania Colony 1731–39; acting Governor of Pennsylvania Colony 1736–38. Grandfather of George Logan.
  - George Logan (1753–1821), Pennsylvania State Representative 1785–89 1795–96 1799, U.S. Senator from Pennsylvania 1801–07. Grandson of James Logan.

== Logans of Illinois ==
- John Logan, member of the Illinois Legislature. Father of John A. Logan.
  - John A. Logan (1826–1886), Illinois State Representative 1852, U.S. Representative from Illinois 1859–62 1867–71, delegate to the Republican National Convention 1868 1880, U.S. Senator from Illinois 1871–77 1879–86, candidate for the Republican nomination for President of the United States 1884, candidate for Vice President of the United States 1884. Son of John A. Logan.

== Longs ==
See Long family

== Longleys ==
- James B. Longley (1924–1980), Governor of Maine 1975–79. Father of James B. Longley Jr.
  - James B. Longley Jr. (born 1951), U.S. Representative from Maine 1995–97, candidate for Governor of Maine 1998. Son of James B. Longley.
  - Susan Longley (born 1955), Maine State Senator 1994–2002. Daughter of James B. Longley, and sister of James B. Longley Jr.

== Longyears ==
- Davis Winne (1818–1902), Sheriff of Ulster County, New York 1861 1864; New York Assemblyman 1876 1887. First cousin of John W. Longyear.
- John W. Longyear (1820–1875), U.S. Representative from Michigan 1863–67, delegate to the Michigan Constitutional Convention 1867, delegate to the Republican National Convention 1868, U.S. District Court Judge in Michigan. First cousin of Davis Winne.
- Isaac W. Longyear (1831–1882), Supervisor of Shandaken, New York 1862–66; New York Assemblyman 1877. Second cousin of Davis Winne and John W. Longyear.
  - John Munro Longyear (1850–1922), Mayor of Marquette, Michigan 1890–91. Son of John W. Longyear.
  - Charles Davis (1853–1913), New York State Senator 1896–98, Surrogate of Ulster County, New York 1899. Second cousin once removed of Davis Winne, John W. Longyear, and Isaac W. Longyear.
    - Robert D. Longyear, U.S. Vice Consul in Port-au-Prince, Haiti 1922; U.S. Consul in Lucerne, Switzerland 1926; U.S. Consul in Munich, Germany 1932; U.S. Consul in Marseille, France 1938. Son of John Munro Longyear.

NOTE: John Munro Longyear was also second cousin by marriage of Kingston, New York Mayor Aaron Thompson.

== Lords ==
- Miles Lord (1919–2016), Minnesota Attorney General 1955–60, Judge of the United States District Court for the District of Minnesota 1966–85.
  - Priscilla Lord (born 1942), candidate for the Democratic nomination in the 2008 Minnesota U.S. Senate election. Daughter of Miles Lord.
  - Jim Lord (1948–2008), Treasurer of Minnesota 1975–83. Son of Miles Lord.

== Louds ==
- Henry M. Loud (1824–1905), candidate for U.S. Representative from Michigan 1886. Father of George A. Loud.
  - George A. Loud (1852–1925), U.S. Representative from Michigan 1903–13 1915–17. Son of Henry M. Loud.

== Lounsburys ==
- George E. Lounsbury (1838–1904), Connecticut State Senator 1895–96, Governor of Connecticut 1899–1901. Brother of Phineas C. Lounsbury.
- Phineas C. Lounsbury (1841–1925), Connecticut State Representative 1874, Governor of Connecticut 1887–89. Brother of George E. Lounsbury.

== Lovejoys ==
- Owen Lovejoy (1811–1864), Illinois State Representative 1854–56, delegate to the Republican National Convention 1856, U.S. Representative from Illinois 1857–64. Third cousin twice removed of John H. Lovejoy.
  - John H. Lovejoy (1842–1???), Mayor of Rockland, Maine 1874–75 1879–80 1895–97. Third cousin twice removed of Owen Lovejoy.

NOTE: Owen Lovejoy was also cousin of U.S. Senator Nathan A. Farwell.

== Lowes, the Mimses, and the Spencers ==
- W. Matt Lowe (1872–1955), mayor of Minden, Louisiana, 1916 to 1920; member of the Webster Parish Police Jury, the parish governing body, 1940 to 1954, father-in-law of Leland Mims and grandfather of George B. Spencer Jr.
  - George Benjamin Spencer Jr. (1925–2007), two-term member of the Quorum Court of Jefferson County, Arkansas, the county governing body, grandson of W. Matt Lowe and nephew by marriage of Leland G. Mims

== Lowenthals ==
- Alan Lowenthal, United States Representative (2013-2023); Member of the California State Senate (2004-2012); Member of the California State Assembly (1998-2004); Member of the Long Beach City Council (1992-1998). Previously married to Bonnie.
- Bonnie Lowenthal (née Adler), Member of the California State Assembly (2008-2014); Member of the Long Beach City Council (2001-2008). Previously married to Alan.
  - Josh Lowenthal, Member of the California State Assembly (2022–present). Son of Alan and Bonnie.
  - Daniel Lowenthal, Judge on the Los Angeles Superior Court. Son of Alan and Bonnie, previously married to Suja.
  - Suja Lowenthal (née Joseph), Member of the Long Beach City Council (2006-2016). Previously married to Daniel.

== Lowndes ==
- Rawlins Lowndes (1721–1800), South Carolina Colony Assemblyman, member of the South Carolina Colony Council of Safety, President of South Carolina 1778, Governor of South Carolina 1778–79, South Carolina Assemblyman, South Carolina State Representative 1787–90. Father of Thomas Lowndes and William Lowndes.
  - Thomas Lowndes (1766–1843), member of the South Carolina Legislature, U.S. Representative from South Carolina 1801–05. Son of Rawlins Lowndes.
  - William Lowndes (1782–1822), South Carolina State Representative 1806, U.S. Representative from South Carolina 1811–22. Son of Rawlins Lowndes.

NOTE: William Lowndes was also son-in-law of U.S. Representative Thomas Pinckney.

== Lowries ==
- Walter Lowrie (1784–1868), Pennsylvania State Representative 1811–12, Pennsylvania State Senator 1813–19, U.S. Senator from Pennsylvania 1819–25. Uncle of Walter H. Lowrie.
  - Walter H. Lowrie (1807–1876), District Court Judge in Pennsylvania 1846–51, Justice of the Pennsylvania Supreme Court 1851–57, Chief Justice of the Pennsylvania Supreme Court 1857–63. Nephew of Walter Lowrie.

== Lucases ==
- John Baptiste Charles Lucas (1759–1842), Pennsylvania State Representative 1792–98, Common Pleas Court Judge in Pennsylvania 1794, U.S. Representative from Pennsylvania 1803–05, District Court Judge in Louisiana 1805–20, Commissioner of Land Claims in Louisiana 1805–12. Father of Charles Lucas.
  - Charles Lucas (1792–1817), member of the Missouri Territory Legislature. Son of John Baptiste Charles Lucas.

== Lucases of Virginia ==
- Edward Lucas (1780–1858), member of the Virginia Legislature, U.S. Representative from Virginia 1833–37. Brother of William Lucas.
- William Lucas (1800–1877), member of the Virginia Legislature, U.S. Representative from Virginia 1839–41 1843–45. Brother of Edward Lucas.

== Luceys ==
- Gregory C. Lucey (1896–1977), Wisconsin Democratic Central Committeeman 1954. Father of Patrick Joseph Lucey.
  - Patrick Joseph Lucey (1918–2014), Justice of the Peace in Ferryville, Wisconsin 1946–50; Wisconsin Assemblyman 1949–51; Chairman of the Wisconsin Democratic Party 1957–63; Lieutenant Governor of Wisconsin 1965–67 candidate for Governor of Wisconsin 1966; delegate to the Democratic National Convention 1968 1972; Governor of Wisconsin 1971–77; U.S. Ambassador to Mexico 1977–79; candidate for Vice President of the United States 1980. Son of Gregory C. Lucey.

== Lujans ==
- Eugene David Lujan (1887–1980), Judge of the Supreme Court of New Mexico 1945–59. Grandfather of Michelle Lujan Grisham, fifth cousin of Manuel Lujan Sr., and second cousin once removed of Ben Lujan.
  - Michelle Lujan Grisham (born 1959), Governor of New Mexico 2019-, U.S. Representative from New Mexico 2013–2018, New Mexico Health Secretary 2004–07. Granddaughter of Eugene Lujan, fourth cousin of Ben Ray Lujan, and sixth cousin once removed of Manuel Lujan Jr.
- Manuel Lujan Sr. (1893–1975), Mayor of Santa Fe 1942–48; Republican nominee for Governor of New Mexico, 1948
  - Manuel Lujan Jr. (1928–2019), U.S. Representative from New Mexico 1969–89, U.S. Secretary of the Interior 1989–93. Sixth cousin once removed of Michelle Lujan Grisham.
- Ben Lujan (1935–2012), New Mexico State Representative 1975–2012. Father of Ben Ray Lujan, fifth cousin once removed of Manuel Lujan Sr., and second cousin once removed of Eugene David Lujan.
  - Ben Ray Lujan (born 1972), U.S. Senator from New Mexico since January 2021, U.S. Representative from New Mexico 2009–2021, Chairman of the Democratic Congressional Campaign Committee 2015–2021. Son of Ben Lujan.

== Lukens ==
- James T. Luken (1921–1979), Ohio State Representative, Cincinnati, Ohio Councilman; Mayor of Cincinnati, Ohio 1976–77. Brother of Thomas A. Luken.
- Thomas A. Luken (1925–2018), Solicitor of Deer Park, Ohio 1955–61; U.S. Attorney in Ohio 1961–64; Cincinnati, Ohio Councilman 1964–67 1969–74; Mayor of Cincinnati, Ohio 1971–72; U.S. Representative from Ohio 1977–91. Brother of James T. Luken.
  - Charles J. Luken (born 1951), candidate for Democratic nomination for Cincinnati, Ohio Councilman 1979; candidate for Cincinnati, Ohio Councilman 1979; Cincinnati, Ohio Councilman 1981–84; Mayor of Cincinnati, Ohio 1984–91 1999–2005; U.S. Representative from Ohio 1991–93; delegate to the Democratic National Convention 2004. Son of Thomas A. Luken.

== Lumpkins ==
- Wilson Lumpkin (1783–1870), Georgia State Representative 1804–12, U.S. Representative from Georgia 1815–17 1827–31, Governor of Georgia 1831–35, U.S. Senator from Georgia 1837–41. Brother of Joseph Henry Lumpkin.
- Joseph Henry Lumpkin (1799–1867), Georgia Assemblyman 1824–25, Chief Justice of the Georgia Supreme Court 1863–67. Brother of Wilson Lumpkin.
  - John Henry Lumpkin (1812–1860), Georgia State Representative 1835, candidate for U.S. Representative from Georgia 1840, U.S. Representative from Georgia 1843–49 1855–57, candidate for Governor of Georgia 1857, delegate to the Democratic National Convention 1860. Nephew of Wilson Lumpkin and Joseph Henry Lumpkin.
    - Middleton P. Barrow (1839–1903), delegate to the Georgia Constitutional Convention 1877, Georgia State Representative 1880–81, U.S. Senator from Georgia 1882–83. Grandson of Wilsom Lumpkin.

== Lynches ==
- Thomas Lynch (1727–1776), South Carolina Colony Assemblyman 1751–57 1761–63 1765 1768 1772, Delegate to the Continental Congress from South Carolina 1774–76. Father of Thomas Lynch Jr.
  - Thomas Lynch Jr. (1749–1779), delegate to the South Carolina Constitutional Convention 1776, Delegate to the Continental Congress from South Carolina 1776. Son of Thomas Lynch.

== Lynes ==
- James Kendall Lynes (1903–1962), Member of the Iowa Senate (1941–62), brother of William Sanford Lynes
- William Sanford Lynes (1893–1963), Member of the Iowa House of Representatives (1947–55, 1961–63), speaker of the Iowa House 1951–55), brother of James Kendall Lynes

== Lyons and Thayers ==
- Lucius Lyon (1800–1851), U.S. Congressional Delegate from Michigan Territory 1833–35, delegate to the Michigan Constitutional Convention 1835, U.S. Senator from Michigan 1837–39, U.S. Representative from Michigan 1843–45. Uncle of George W. Thayer.
  - George W. Thayer (1827–1916), Mayor of Grand Rapids, Michigan 1877–78. Nephew of Lucius Lyon.

== Lyonses and Wilkinsons of Louisiana ==
- Charlton Lyons (1894–1973), oilman, "Mr. Republican" in Louisiana, party gubernatorial nominee in 1964 and state party chairman from 1964 to 1968, father of Hall Lyons, father-in-law of Susybelle Lyons
- W. Scott Wilkinson (1895–1985), lawyer, businessman and Democratic member of the Louisiana House of Representatives 1920 to 1924, father of Susybelle Lyons
  - Susybelle Wilkinson Lyons (1923–2007), philanthropist, delegate to the 1960 Republican National Convention, daughter of W. Scott Wilkinson, daughter-in-law of Charlton Lyons, and sister-in-law of Hall Lyons

== Lytles and Rowans ==
- John Rowan (1773–1843), Kentucky Secretary of State 1804–06, U.S. Representative from Kentucky 1807–09, Kentucky State Representative 1813–17 1822 1824, Judge of the Kentucky Court of Appeals 1819–21, U.S. Senator from Kentucky 1825–31. Father of John Rowan Jr.
  - John Rowan Jr. (1807–1855), U.S. Chargé d'Affaires to Two Sicilies, Italy 1848. Son of John Rowan.
  - Robert Todd Lytle (1804–1839), Ohio State Representative 1828–29, U.S. Representative from Ohio 1833–34 1834–35, Surveyor of Public Lands of the Northwest Territory 1836. Nephew of John Rowan.
