= Olga T. Weber =

American activist (1903–1978)

Olga T. Weber (April 27, 1903 – August 1, 1978) was an American activist known for her work campaigning for the recognition of Constitution Day and Constitution Week in Ohio and later, for the United States as a whole. Her efforts led to the annual celebration of Constitution Week in Louisville, Ohio, and the town being named "Constitution Town."

== Biography ==
Weber was born April 27, 1903, in Pittsburgh.

Weber didn't want others to forget or take for granted their rights and freedoms. So in 1951, Olga started to hand out copies of the US Constitution, Bill of Rights, flag booklets and patriotic leaflets to local schools, churches, libraries and the public. She encouraged the first celebration of Constitution Day, September 17, 1952, in Louisville after meeting with Mayor Gerald Romary and the city council. She also created a committee for "the preservation of the Constitution." Weber also petitioned municipal officials to establish an official, annual Constitution Day, to honor the ratification of the Constitution in 1789.

In April 1953, Weber was successful in having the Ohio General Assembly proclaim September 17 as statewide Constitution Day.

In 1953, Representative Frank T. Bow took the idea to make Constitution Day a national holiday to the House of Representatives. Bow recognized Weber and Romary for their part in encouraging the creation of the holiday. Congress passed a resolution creating Constitution Week. The Senate and the House approved her request and President Dwight D. Eisenhower signs it into law.

On April 15, 1957, the city council of Louisville, Ohio, declared the city, Constitution Town. In 1958 the Ohio State Archaeological and Historical Society donated four historical markers for the main entrances to the city which explained Louisville's role as the originator of Constitution Day.

In 1962 and 1963 Weber was awarded the George Washington honor medal in the community program category. Then in 1975, Weber received a Congress of Freedom award for her community activities and work. Weber is also acknowledged for her idea to make March 1 Ohio Statehood day being that on March 1, 1803, Ohio was admitted into the Union. This idea was given to Rep. William J. Healy of Canton then passed both the House and the Senate when it was signed in February 1976 by Rep. Vernal G. Riffe JR. speaker of the Ohio House of Representatives and Lt. Gov. Richard Celeste, presiding office of the Ohio Senate. Weber remained active with the Constitution Day Committee up until her death. Weber died on August 1, 1978. Due to Weber's work, Louisville continues to hold an annual Constitution Week festival consisting of car shows, balloon liftoffs, choir concerts, banquets queen pageants, fireworks and a parade.
