= Louisville, Ohio =

- City
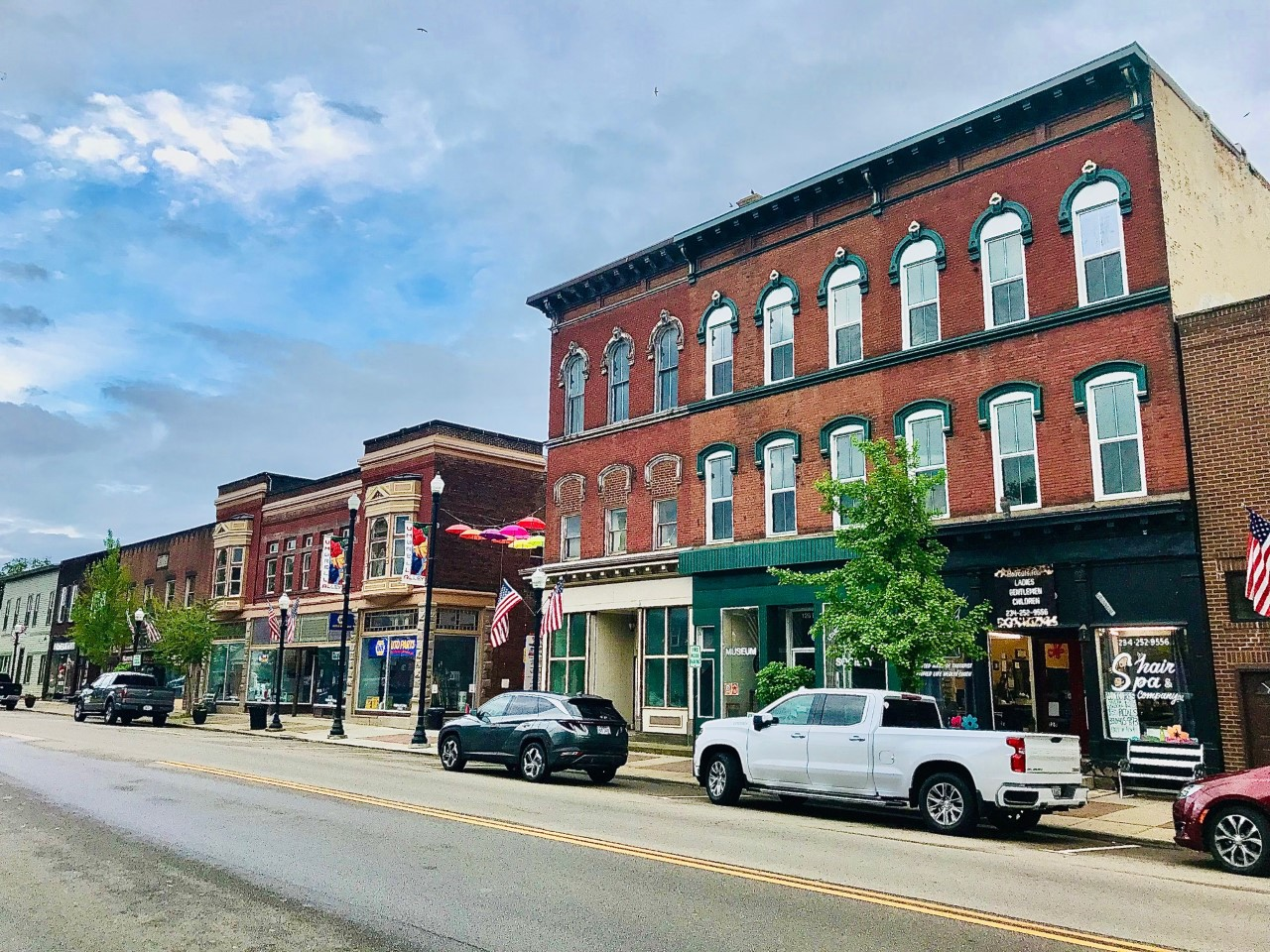
- Downtown Louisville
- Nickname: "The Constitution Town"
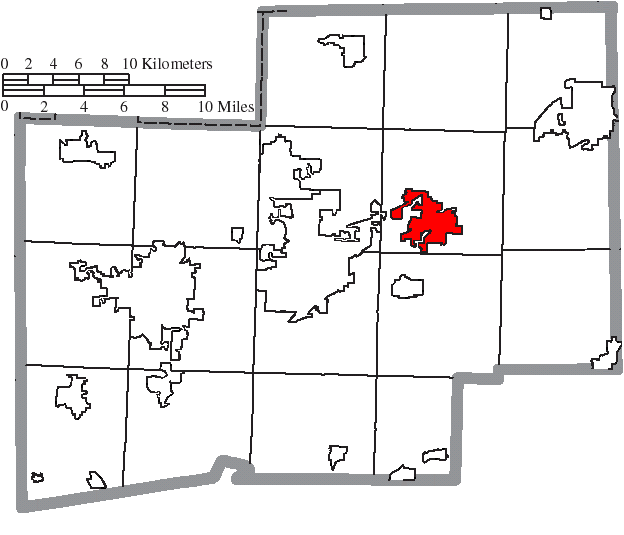
- Location of Louisville in Stark County

- Location within Ohio Location within the United States
- Coordinates: 40°50′08″N 81°15′13″W
- Country: United States
- State: Ohio
- County: Stark

Area
  - Total: 5.70 sq mi (14.76 km^{2})
  - Land: 5.70 sq mi (14.76 km^{2})
  - Water: 0 sq mi (0.00 km^{2})
- Elevation: 1,099 ft (335 m)

Population (2020)
  - Total: 9,521
  - Density: 1,670/sq mi (644.9/km^{2})
- Time zone: UTC−5 (Eastern (EST))
  - Summer (DST): UTC−4 (EDT)
- ZIP code: 44641
- Area code: 330
- FIPS code: 39-45094
- GNIS feature ID: 1086980
- Website: Louisville, Ohio

Louisville (/ˈluːɪsvɪl/ LOO-iss-vil) is a city in Stark County, Ohio, United States. The population was 9,521 at the time of the 2020 census. Located 7 miles (11 km) northeast of Canton, it is a suburb in the Canton–Massillon metropolitan area.

== History ==
On October 8, 1834, Louisville was formally settled by Henry Lautzenheiser, from Germany, and Frederick Fainot, a French Huguenot. The city was named after Lautzenheiser's son, Lewis, and called Lewisville, Ohio. The name of the town was also considered appropriate because it was initially surveyed by the similar-sounding name of Lewis Vail. When the post office was established in 1837, with Sam Petree as its first postmaster, it was discovered Ohio already had a Lewisville, so the spelling was changed to Louisville.

Within Louisville's early days, the town competed with the fellow Nimishillen Township community of Harrisburg (also known as Barryville) for growth. Harrisburg initially flourished due to its accessibility as a stagecoach stop between Canton, Alliance, Cleveland, and Pittsburgh. Meanwhile, Louisville also grew, due to its location upon the east branch of the Nimishillen Creek, which flows toward Canton. However, when the Pittsburgh, Fort Wayne and Chicago Railway was laid through Louisville in 1852, Louisville began to grow more quickly than Harrisburg, which struggled with the difficulty of hauling its main product, wheat, by barge. Today, Harrisburg is now an unincorporated community, marked only by a handful of businesses and a Roman Catholic parish.

On April 1, 1872, Louisville was officially incorporated as a village, with George Violand elected as Louisville's first mayor. By the late 19th Century, Louisville contained many quickly growing businesses, including: a plow manufacturing company, a wooden mill, a brewery, a basket factory, flour mills, tanneries, a brick yard, two hotels, a shoe factory, and a number of taverns/saloons (Louisville had twenty saloons at one point, giving the town a rather notorious reputation). Two of these businesses, Star Mill and the Town Tavern, remain open to this day. Furthermore, many of the buildings constructed within Louisville during this time period are listed upon the National Register of Historic Places. Such locations include Saint Louis Catholic Church, which was completed in 1870 and dedicated in 1878, and the city's historic downtown district, roughly bordered by Chapel Street, Lincoln Court, St. Louis Court, Nickelplate Street, East Gorgas Street, and Center Court. The city's current weekly newspaper, The Louisville Herald, was first published in 1887. For a brief time, the town also had a Roman Catholic college, established by the Reverend Louis Hoffer, located across the street from St. Louis Church. Called Saint Louis College, it opened in 1866 under the operation of the Diocese of Cleveland. The Congregation of St. Basil of Toronto assumed control of the college the following year, and Saint Louis College closed in 1873, due to lack of funds and transportation difficulties for the students. After briefly serving as an all-girls academy and a school for deaf mutes, the building became an orphanage under the guidance of the Vincentian Sisters of Charity. The Saint Louis Orphan Asylum closed in 1925, and became a hospice for the elderly, named St. Joseph's, in 1927. The old red brick building was razed in 1975, as St. Joseph's moved across the street from St. Thomas Aquinas High School. A McDonald's is now located upon the site.

The early 1880s saw the arrival of telephone toll lines to Louisville. Louisville's first public street lights, twelve oil burners, were lit downtown for Christmas 1884. In 1894, a public water system was established for Louisville, and a sewage system installation followed in 1910. The town's Main Street became Louisville's first fully paved road in 1914. In 1960, Louisville's residents voted for the village to become a city.

=== Constitution Town ===
Louisville is also known as the "Constitution Town" because a resident of Louisville, Olga T. Weber, petitioned for the establishment of Constitution Day for the United States in 1952. Her lobbying led the Ohio General Assembly to proclaim September 17 as a statewide "Constitution Day," under a law signed by then-governor Frank J. Lausche. The following year, Weber urged the United States Senate to declare the week of September 17–23 as "Constitution Week". Her request was approved by both the Senate and the United States House of Representatives, and signed into law by President Dwight D. Eisenhower. On April 15, 1957, Louisville's City Council officially declared itself "The Constitution Town." The city continues to hold a "Constitution Week" celebration annually during the week of September 17.

== Geography ==
The east branch of Nimishillen Creek flows through the city.

According to the United States Census Bureau, the city has a total area of 5.49 square miles (14.22 km^{2}), all land.

== Demographics ==
Historical population
Census	Pop.	Note	%±
1880	1,650		—
1890	1,323		−19.8%
1900	1,374		3.9%
1910	1,678		22.1%
1920	2,008		19.7%
1930	3,130		55.9%
1940	3,379		8.0%
1950	3,801		12.5%
1960	5,116		34.6%
1970	6,298		23.1%
1980	7,996		27.0%
1990	8,087		1.1%
2000	8,904		10.1%
2010	9,186		3.2%
2020	9,521		3.6%

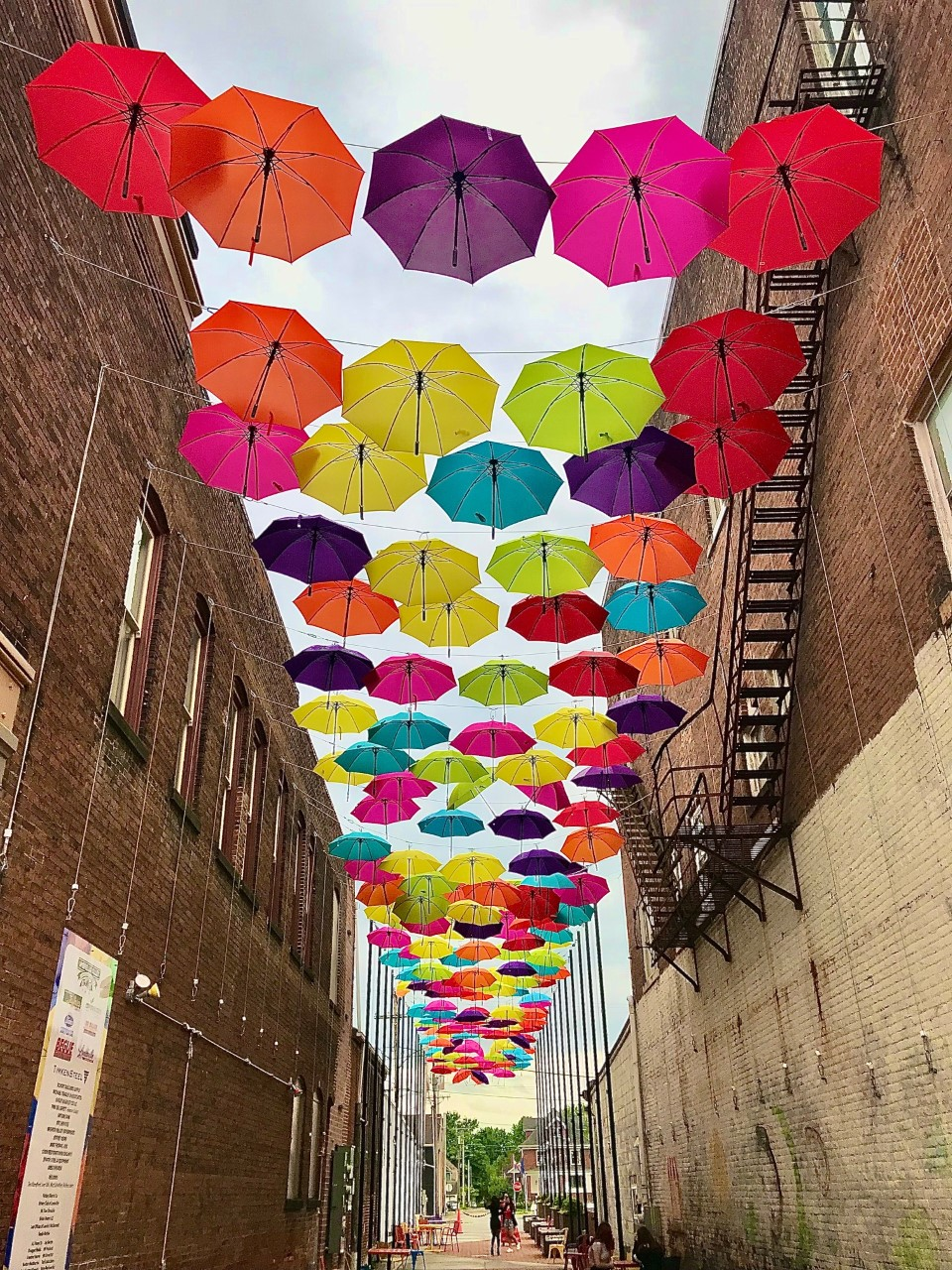
Umbrella Alley, an art installation in Downtown Louisville

=== 2020 census ===
As of the 2020 census, Louisville had a population of 9,521. The median age was 40.9 years. 22.8% of residents were under the age of 18 and 20.4% of residents were 65 years of age or older. For every 100 females there were 89.7 males, and for every 100 females age 18 and over there were 86.9 males age 18 and over.

99.1% of residents lived in urban areas, while 0.9% lived in rural areas.

There were 4,040 households in Louisville, of which 29.9% had children under the age of 18 living in them. Of all households, 45.1% were married-couple households, 17.4% were households with a male householder and no spouse or partner present, and 29.5% were households with a female householder and no spouse or partner present. About 31.1% of all households were made up of individuals and 15.3% had someone living alone who was 65 years of age or older.

There were 4,235 housing units, of which 4.6% were vacant. The homeowner vacancy rate was 1.0% and the rental vacancy rate was 5.0%.

Racial composition as of the 2020 census
Race	Number	Percent
White	8,971	94.2%
Black or African American	43	0.5%
American Indian and Alaska Native	14	0.1%
Asian	45	0.5%
Native Hawaiian and Other Pacific Islander	2	0.0%
Some other race	50	0.5%
Two or more races	396	4.2%
Hispanic or Latino (of any race)	148	1.6%

=== 2010 census ===
As of the census of 2010, there were 9,186 people, 3,727 households, and 2,498 families residing in the city. The population density was 1,673.2 inhabitants per square mile (646.0/km^{2}). There were 3,995 housing units at an average density of 727.7 per square mile (281.0/km^{2}). The racial makeup of the city was 98.3% White, 0.2% African American, 0.2% Native American, 0.3% Asian, 0.2% from other races, and 0.9% from two or more races. Hispanic or Latino of any race were 1.3% of the population.

There were 3,727 households, of which 33.9% had children under the age of 18 living with them, 49.4% were married couples living together, 13.3% had a female householder with no husband present, 4.4% had a male householder with no wife present, and 33.0% were non-families. 28.0% of all households were made up of individuals, and 15.4% had someone living alone who was 65 years of age or older. The average household size was 2.44 and the average family size was 2.99.

The median age in the city was 39.4 years. 25.4% of residents were under the age of 18; 7.4% were between the ages of 18 and 24; 24.7% were from 25 to 44; 24.5% were from 45 to 64; and 18% were 65 years of age or older. The gender makeup of the city was 46.5% male and 53.5% female.

=== 2000 census ===
As of the census of 2000, there were 8,904 people, 3,444 households, and 2,465 families residing in the city. The population density was 1,726.6 inhabitants per square mile (666.6/km^{2}). There were 3,544 housing units at an average density of 687.2 per square mile (265.3/km^{2}). The racial makeup of the city was 98.53% White, 0.31% African American, 0.15% Native American, 0.29% Asian, 0.07% from other races, and 0.65% from two or more races. Hispanic or Latino of any race were 0.83% of the population.

There were 3,444 households, out of which 35.5% had children under the age of 18 living with them, 56.6% were married couples living together, 11.5% had a female householder with no husband present, and 28.4% were non-families. 24.2% of all households were made up of individuals, and 10.6% had someone living alone who was 65 years of age or older. The average household size was 2.54 and the average family size was 3.03.

In the city the age distribution of the population shows 27.1% under the age of 18, 7.5% from 18 to 24, 29.7% from 25 to 44, 20.6% from 45 to 64, and 15.2% who were 65 years of age or older. The median age was 36 years. For every 100 females, there were 88.7 males. For every 100 females age 18 and over, there were 84.7 males.

The median income for a household in the city was $41,490, and the median income for a family was $49,844. Males had a median income of $37,625 versus $22,398 for females. The per capita income for the city was $20,783. About 3.1% of families and 4.0% of the population were below the poverty line, including 4.5% of those under age 18 and 6.9% of those age 65 or over.

== Education ==
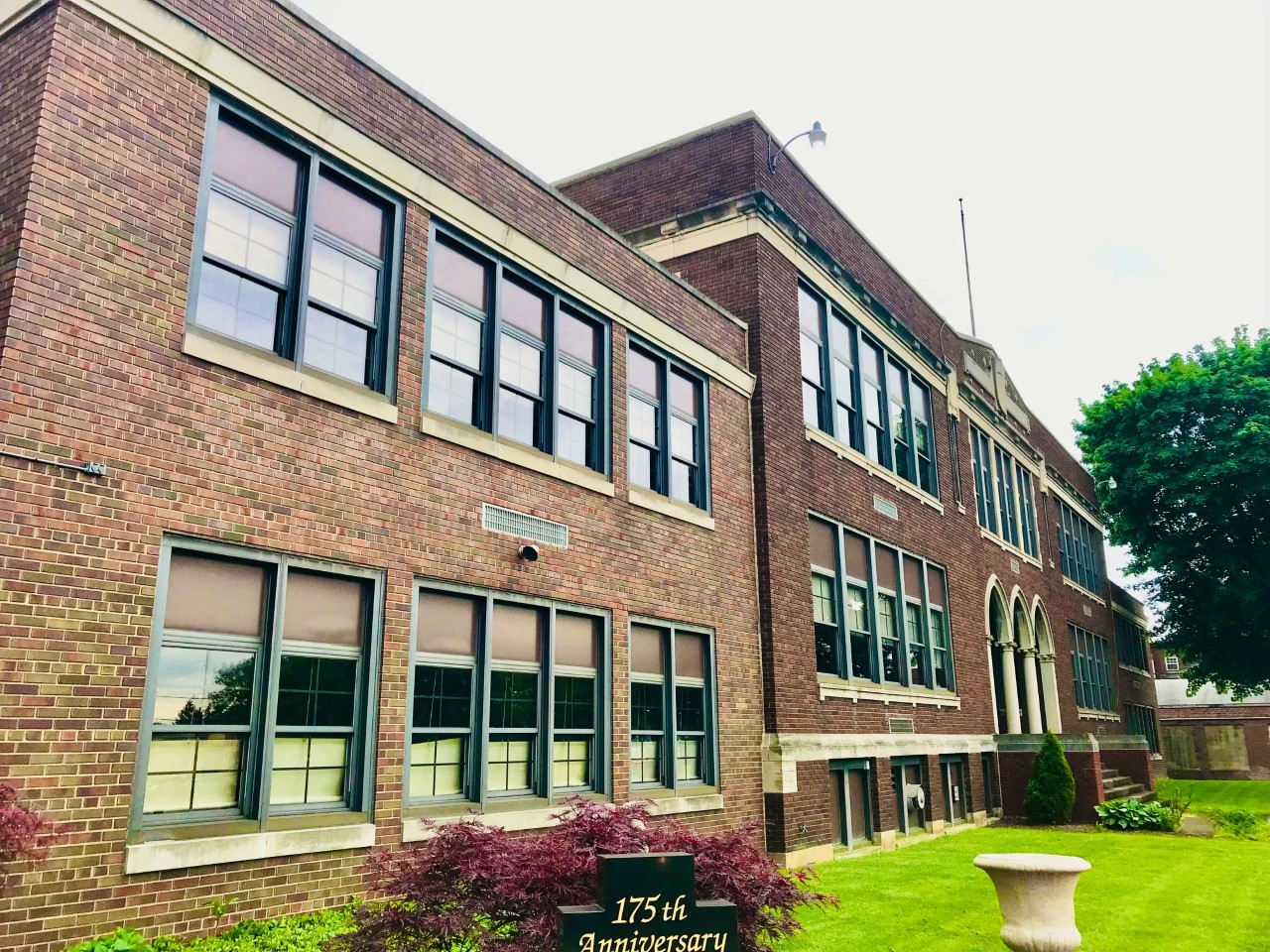
Holy Cross Academy at St. Louis School

=== Public schools ===
Louisville, as well as the majority of the surrounding Nimishillen Township, is served by the Louisville City School District, composed of Louisville High School, Louisville Middle School, Louisville Elementary School and North Nimishillen Elementary School.

=== Private schools ===
St. Thomas Aquinas High School/Middle School and the Holy Cross Academy at Saint Louis Campus are located within the city of Louisville. Saint Louis School opened its doors in 1852. It served Grades Kindergarten through Eighth until the 2013–2014 school year, and enrolled students for Grades PreK-5th from 2014 to 2019. Saint Louis School closed after the 2018–2019 school year due to declining enrollment. St. Thomas Aquinas High School opened in 1964. In 2014, it added a Middle School program to serve Grades 6–8.

== Notable people ==
- Joseph Gabriel Harner, US Navy, Medal of Honor at United States occupation of Veracruz in 1914.
- Augustus D. Juilliard, philanthropist. A Juilliard Arts Center established in his honor is located within Louisville.
- Edward Julien Moinet, United States Federal Court judge
- Pat Rebillot, jazz pianist.
- Olga T. Weber, activist who sought the recognition of Constitution Day and Constitution Week in Ohio and the United States.
