= Robert Edward DeMascio =

American judge (1923–1999)

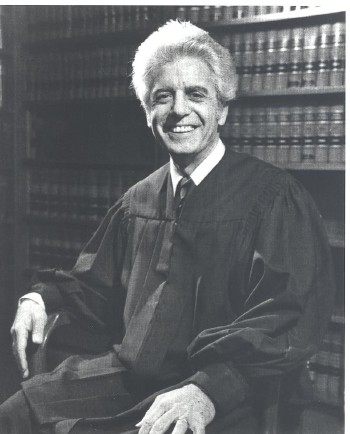

Senior Judge of the United States District Court for the Eastern District of Michigan
- In office January 16, 1988 – March 23, 1999

Judge of the United States District Court for the Eastern District of Michigan
- In office July 22, 1971 – January 16, 1988
- Appointed by: Richard Nixon
- Preceded by: Theodore Levin
- Succeeded by: Bernard A. Friedman

Personal details
- Born: Robert Edward DeMascio; January 11, 1923 Coraopolis, Pennsylvania
- Died: March 23, 1999 (aged 76) Detroit, Michigan
- Spouse: Margaret Loftus
- Education: Wayne State University Law School (LL.B.)

Robert Edward DeMascio (January 11, 1923 – March 23, 1999) was a United States district judge of the United States District Court for the Eastern District of Michigan. Robert E. DeMascio married Margaret Loftus in 1955, they had three children: Robert Jr., Thomas, and Mary.

== Education and career ==
Born in Coraopolis, Pennsylvania, DeMascio entered in the United States Naval Reserve during World War II, from 1943 to 1946. DeMascio completed his undergraduate degree from Wayne State University in 1948 and then obtained a Bachelor of Laws from Wayne State University Law School in 1951. He was in private practice in Detroit, Michigan from 1951 to 1953. He was an Assistant United States Attorney and Chief of the Criminal Division of the Eastern District of Michigan in Detroit from 1954 to 1961, returning to private practice in Detroit from 1961 to 1966. He was a judge of the Recorder's Court in Detroit from 1967 to 1971.

== Federal judicial service ==
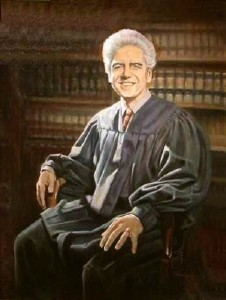
Judicial portrait of DeMascio, 2001, by Robert Maniscalco.

On June 14, 1971, DeMascio was nominated by President Richard Nixon to a seat on the United States District Court for the Eastern District of Michigan vacated by Judge Theodore Levin. DeMascio was confirmed by the United States Senate on July 22, 1971, and received his commission the same day. In 1975, DeMascio took over the complicated desegregation case of Milliken v. Bradley from Judge Roth. For five years DeMascio worked to enforce desegregation in Detroit schools and a number of court-ordered improvements. He assumed senior status on January 16, 1988. DeMascio served in that capacity until his death on March 23, 1999, in Detroit.

== Sources ==
- Robert E. DeMascio Papers, Walter P. Reuther Library

Legal offices
Preceded by Theodore Levin	Judge of the United States District Court for the Eastern District of Michigan; 1971–1988	Succeeded by Bernard A. Friedman
