= Janno Lieber =

American transportation executive

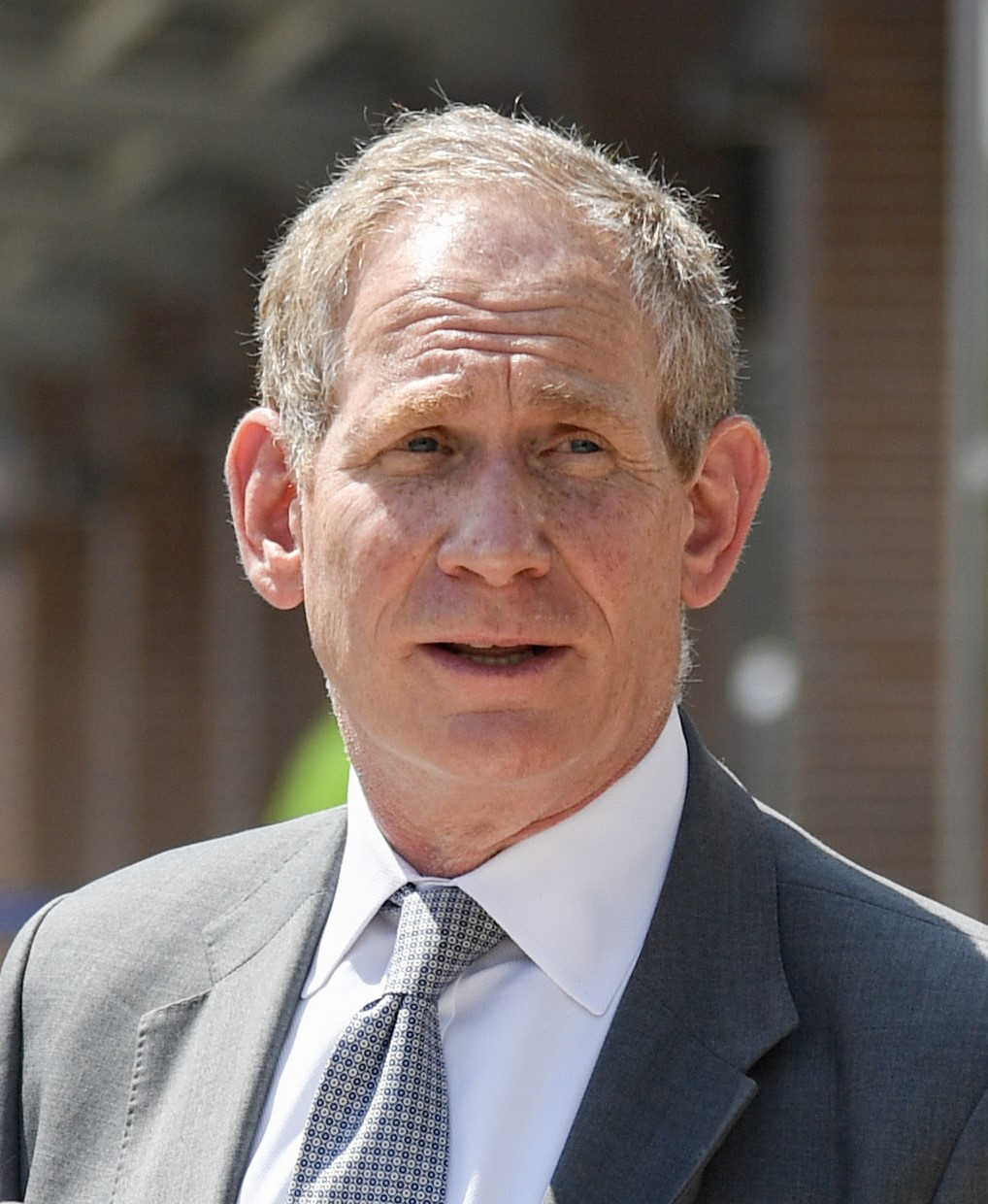
- Lieber in August 2022

15th Chairman and CEO of the Metropolitan Transportation Authority
- Incumbent
- Assumed office January 20, 2022; Acting: July 29, 2021 – January 20, 2022
- Governor: Andrew Cuomo; Kathy Hochul
- Preceded by: Pat Foye

Personal details
- Born: John Nathan Lieber; September 19, 1961 (age 64)
- Education: Harvard University (BA); New York University (JD)

John Nathan "Janno" Lieber (born September 19, 1961) is the head of the Metropolitan Transportation Authority (MTA) in New York. He was appointed acting chair and CEO in July 2021 and confirmed permanently in January 2022.

== Early life and career ==
Lieber was born on September 19, 1961, to Charles and Mimi Levin Lieber. Charles was a president of the Hebrew Publishing Company and Mimi was a member of the New York State Board of Regents. Through his mother he is related to the prominent Levin political and legal family of Michigan; his maternal grandfather was Theodore Levin, former Chief Judge of the United States District Court for the Eastern District of Michigan, and his uncle Charles Levin was a Justice of the Michigan Supreme Court, while his distant cousins Carl, Sander, and Andy Levin have all represented Michigan in the United States Congress.

In the 1980s, Lieber was a journalist at The New Republic.

He worked as a transportation policy advisor during New York City Mayor Ed Koch's administration. Later Lieber served as an acting assistant secretary in the U.S. Department of Transportation during the Clinton administration.

In 2003, he joined Silverstein Properties, where he would later become the president of their World Trade Center Properties division, working on the rebuilding after the September 11 attacks. In a 2015 interview with The New York Times, he described himself as "a jack-of-all-trades," saying, "I do everything from financing to the legal to the design and construction to the P.R. and government relations."

=== Metropolitan Transportation Authority ===
In 2017, then-governor Andrew Cuomo appointed Lieber to be the MTA's chief development officer. In this role of chief development officer, Lieber oversaw a range of capital initiatives including the long-delayed completion of the extension of the Second Avenue Subway line on the East Side of Manhattan.

In July 2021, Cuomo nominated Lieber to serve as acting chair and CEO, following the retirement of Pat Foye. In November 2021, governor Kathy Hochul said she wanted to nominate him for those roles permanently. He was formally nominated by Hochul and subsequently confirmed by the New York State Senate in January 2022.

On January 25, 2023, Lieber rode with Hochul on the first train to the new Grand Central Madison station, part of the East Side Access project.
