= Bernard A. Friedman =

American judge (born 1943)

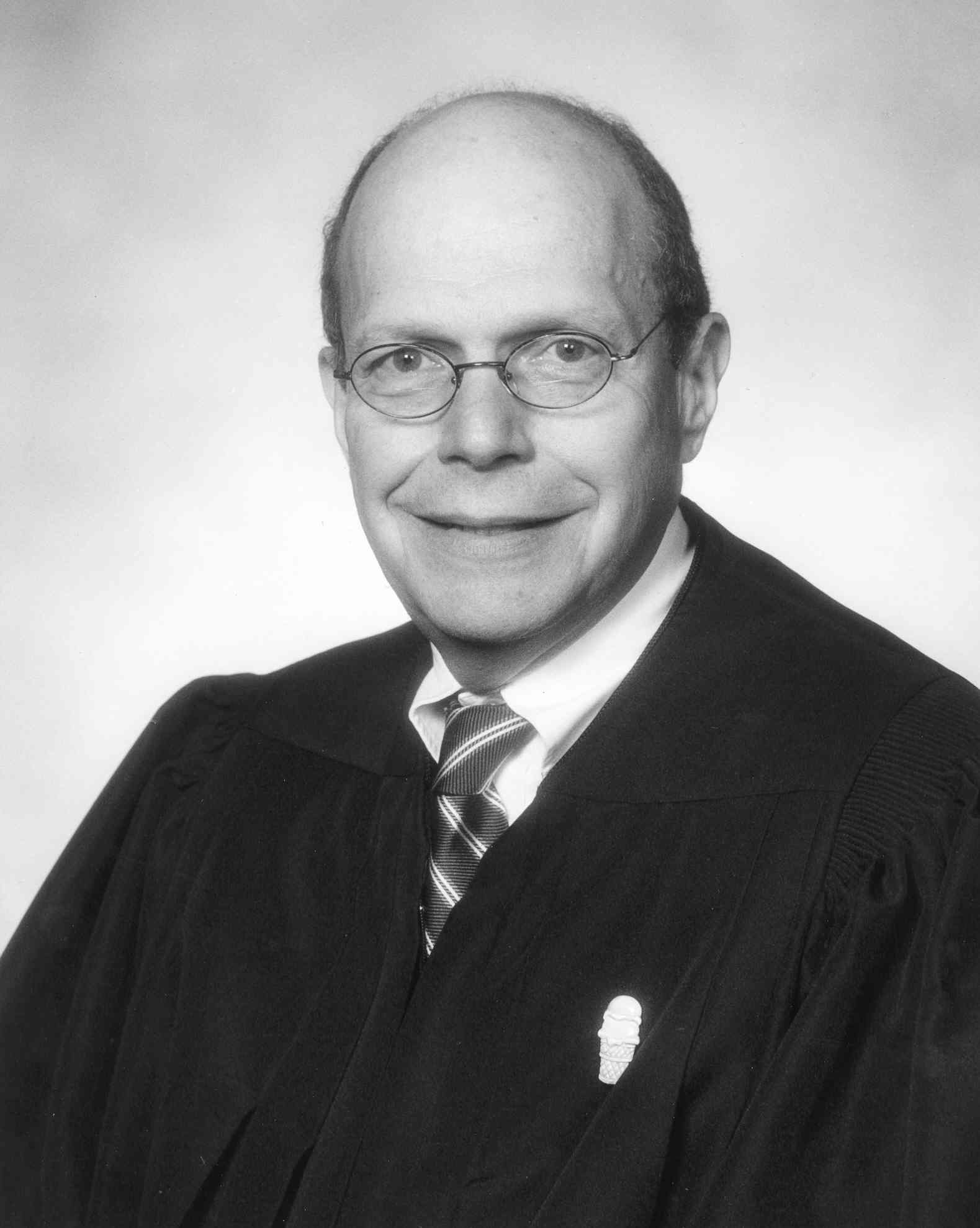

Senior Judge of the United States District Court for the Eastern District of Michigan
- Incumbent
- Assumed office January 1, 2009

Chief Judge of the United States District Court for the Eastern District of Michigan
- In office June 16, 2004 – January 1, 2009
- Preceded by: Lawrence Paul Zatkoff
- Succeeded by: Gerald Ellis Rosen

Judge of the United States District Court for the Eastern District of Michigan
- In office April 20, 1988 – January 1, 2009
- Appointed by: Ronald Reagan
- Preceded by: Robert Edward DeMascio
- Succeeded by: Gershwin A. Drain

Personal details
- Born: September 23, 1943 (age 82) Detroit, Michigan, U.S.
- Education: Detroit College of Law (J.D.)

Bernard Alvin Friedman (born September 23, 1943) is a senior United States district judge of the United States District Court for the Eastern District of Michigan.

== Education and career ==
Born in Detroit, Michigan, Friedman received a Juris Doctor from Detroit College of Law, now Michigan State University College of Law in 1968. He was in the United States Army, JAG Corps from 1967 to 1968, reaching the rank of lieutenant. He continued at this rank in the United States Army Reserve JAG Corps from 1968 to 1973. Friedman was a felony trial attorney of Wayne County prosecutor's office, Michigan from 1969 to 1970. He was in private practice in Detroit from 1970 to 1974, and in Southfield, Michigan from 1974 to 1982. He was a judge on the 48th district court, Michigan from 1982 to 1988.

== Federal judicial service ==
On February 2, 1988, Friedman was nominated by President Ronald Reagan to a seat on the United States District Court for the Eastern District of Michigan vacated by judge Robert Edward DeMascio. Friedman was confirmed by the United States Senate on April 19, 1988, and received his commission on April 20, 1988. He served as chief judge from June 16, 2004 until he assumed senior status on January 1, 2009. When he took senior status, he was replaced by judge Gershwin A. Drain.

== Notable decisions ==
=== Overturning Michigan's same-sex marriage ban ===
On March 21, 2014, Friedman struck down Michigan's constitutional and statutory bans on same-sex marriage. As he did not immediately issue a stay on his ruling, more than three hundred marriage licenses were issued to same-sex couples before the Sixth Circuit Court issued a stay on Friedman's ruling the next day, pending appeals. The federal government announced it would recognize the marriages that took place during the brief period it was legal.

On August 22, 2015, Friedman presided over the wedding of the plaintiffs who he had originally ruled in favor of, after the U.S. Supreme Court had ruled two months earlier that all state bans on same-sex marriage were unconstitutional.

=== Overturning the Federal ban on female genital mutilation (FGM) ===
On November 20, 2018, he ruled that the federal law against female genital mutilation (FGM) is unconstitutional because the law overreaches the federal government's enumerated powers as defined by the "necessary and proper" clause and the "Interstate commerce" clause.

== Sources ==
Legal offices
Preceded by Robert Edward DeMascio	Judge of the United States District Court for the Eastern District of Michigan; 1988–2009	Succeeded by Gershwin A. Drain
Preceded by Lawrence Paul Zatkoff	Chief Judge of the United States District Court for the Eastern District of Michigan; 2004–2009	Succeeded by Gerald Ellis Rosen
