= Edward Julien Moinet =

American judge (1873–1952)

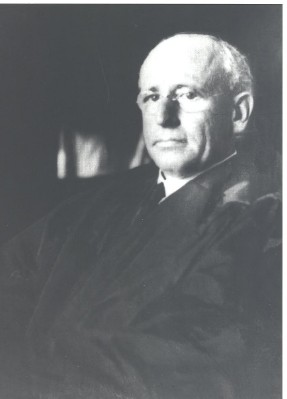

Senior Judge of the United States District Court for the Eastern District of Michigan
- In office February 28, 1946 – December 23, 1952

Judge of the United States District Court for the Eastern District of Michigan
- In office June 13, 1927 – February 28, 1946
- Appointed by: Calvin Coolidge
- Preceded by: Seat established by 44 Stat. 1380
- Succeeded by: Theodore Levin

Personal details
- Born: Edward Julien Moinet; July 14, 1873 Louisville, Ohio
- Died: December 23, 1952 (aged 79) Detroit, Michigan
- Education: University of Michigan Law School (LL.B.)

Edward Julien Moinet (July 14, 1873 – December 23, 1952) was a United States district judge of the United States District Court for the Eastern District of Michigan.

== Education and career ==
Born in Louisville, Ohio, Moinet received a Bachelor of Laws from the University of Michigan Law School in 1895. He was in private practice in Ithaca, Michigan from 1895 to 1899, and in St. Johns, Michigan from 1899 to 1913. He was prosecuting attorney of St. Johns from 1909 to 1915. He was a Judge of the Circuit Court for the 29th Judicial Circuit of the State of Michigan from 1918 to 1927.

== Federal judicial service ==
Moinet received a recess appointment from President Calvin Coolidge on June 13, 1927, to the United States District Court for the Eastern District of Michigan, to a new seat authorized by 44 Stat. 1380. He was nominated to the same position by President Coolidge on December 6, 1927. He was confirmed by the United States Senate on December 19, 1927, and received his commission the same day. He assumed senior status on February 28, 1946. His service terminated on December 23, 1952, due to his death in Detroit, Michigan.

== Sources ==
Legal offices
| Preceded by Seat established by 44 Stat. 1380 | Judge of the United States District Court for the Eastern District of Michigan; 1927–1946 | Succeeded by Theodore Levin |
