= St. Louis Church (Louisville, Ohio) =

Historic church in Ohio, United States

- U.S. National Register of Historic Places
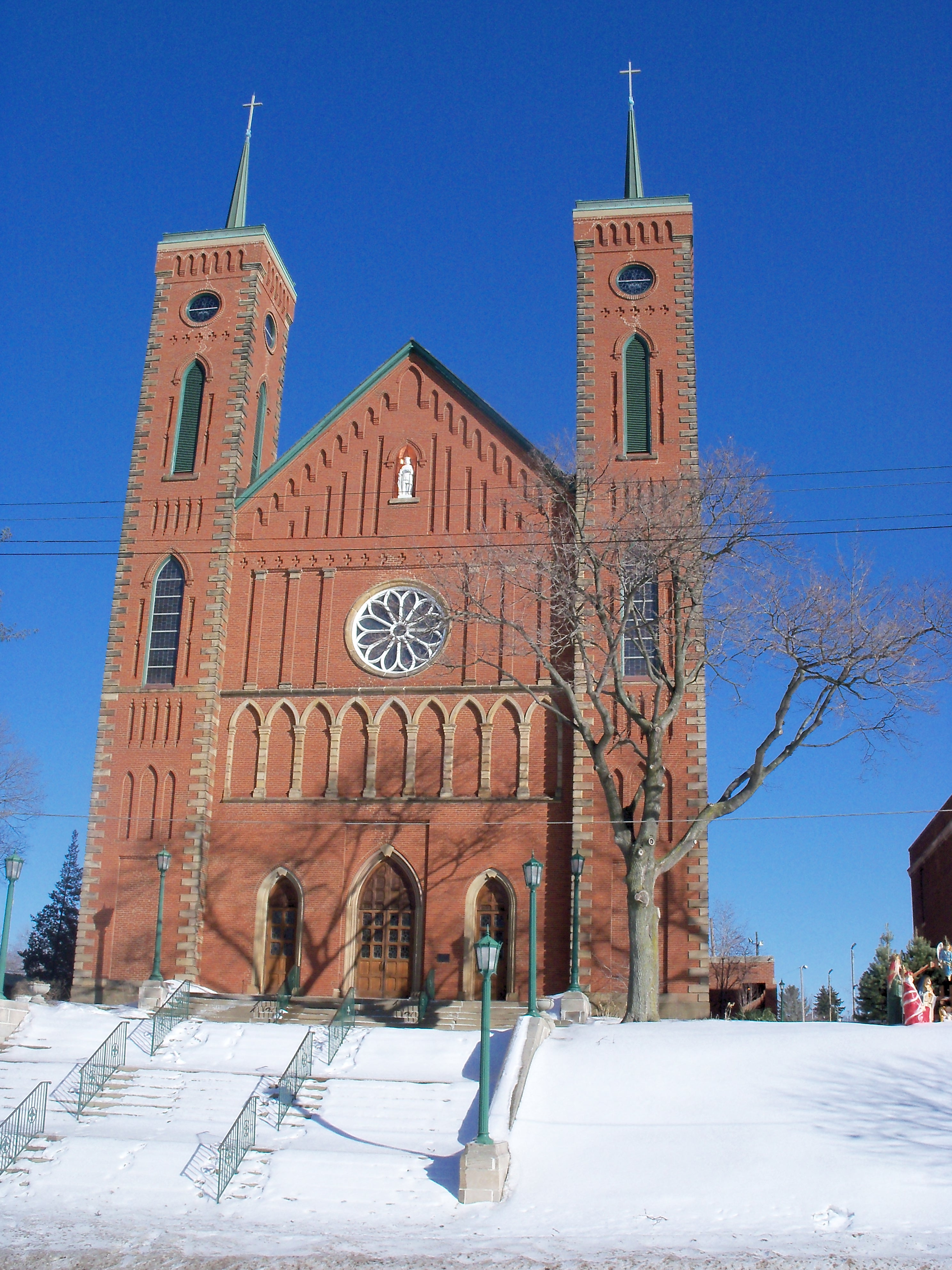

- Location within Ohio Location within the United States
- Location: 300 N. Chapel St., Louisville, Ohio
- Coordinates: 40°50′20″N 81°15′33″W
- Area: less than one acre
- Built: 1870–75
- Architect: Father Louis Hoffer; Frank Walsh
- Architectural style: Gothic, High Victorian Gothic
- NRHP reference No.: 79001951
- Added to NRHP: February 22, 1979

St. Louis Church is a historic Roman Catholic church in Louisville, Ohio. The building was added to the National Register of Historic Places in 1979.

It was built in 1870–75 in a French Gothic/High Victorian Gothic style. It is rectangular, 60 by 130 feet (18 m × 40 m) in plan, with two square 100 feet (30 m) tall towers. It served a community of French Catholic immigrants who left eastern France in 1826 and settled here. A brick church was built by 1838, which was demolished in 1869 to make room for the present church which was completed in 1875. It was designed by parish priest Father Louis Hoffer reportedly after the design of a small village cathedral in France. Its interior was designed by Cleveland architect Frank Walsh.
