= Charles Levin (judge) =

American judge (1926–2020)

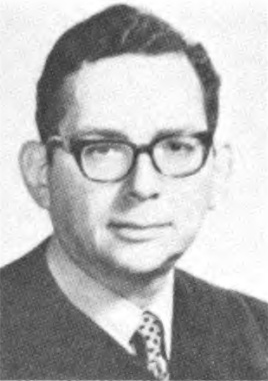

Associate Justice of the Michigan Supreme Court
- In office January 1, 1973 – December 31, 1996

Judge of the Michigan Court of Appeals
- In office 1966–1973

Personal details
- Born: April 28, 1926 Detroit, Michigan
- Died: November 19, 2020 (aged 94) Detroit, Michigan
- Education: University of Michigan (B.A., LL.B.)

Charles Leonard Levin (April 28, 1926 – November 19, 2020) was an American judge. He served as a Michigan Court of Appeals judge from 1966 to 1972 and as a justice of the Michigan Supreme Court from 1973 to 1996.

== Early life and career ==
He was born in Detroit, Michigan. He attended the University of Michigan where he received his Bachelor of Arts in 1946 and his Bachelor of Laws in 1947 from the University of Michigan Law School. He is a member of the Levin political and legal family of Michigan.

When he decided to run for the Michigan Supreme Court, Levin did not feel comfortable running as either a Democratic or Republican nominee. He then formed his own party and nominated himself. He was elected to two additional terms as an independent candidate. During his tenure on the bench, he gained the respect of many colleagues, prompting U.S. District Court Judge Avern Cohn to note, "Justice Levin has displayed scholarship, pragmatism, insight, honesty, courage, and humanity."

Levin's father, Theodore Levin, was a federal district court judge. His brother, Joseph Levin, ran for a seat in the United States House of Representatives in 1974. His sister Mimi Levin Lieber served on the Board of Regents of the University of the State of New York; her son and Charles's nephew Janno Lieber has been Chairman and CEO of the New York Metropolitan Transportation Authority since 2022. Levin's cousin Carl Levin was a U.S. senator for Michigan from 1979 to 2015. His cousin Sander Levin was the U.S. congressman for Michigan's 9th congressional district from 1983 to 2019. From 2019 until 2023, his cousin Andy Levin served as the U.S. congressman for Michigan's 9th congressional district.

In 1999, Levin was remarried to a former law clerk, Helene White, who has been a Judge of the United States Court of Appeals for the Sixth Circuit since 2008. The couple divorced in November 2006.

Levin died on November 19, 2020, in Detroit at the age of 94.
