= Constitution Day and Citizenship Day =

US holiday

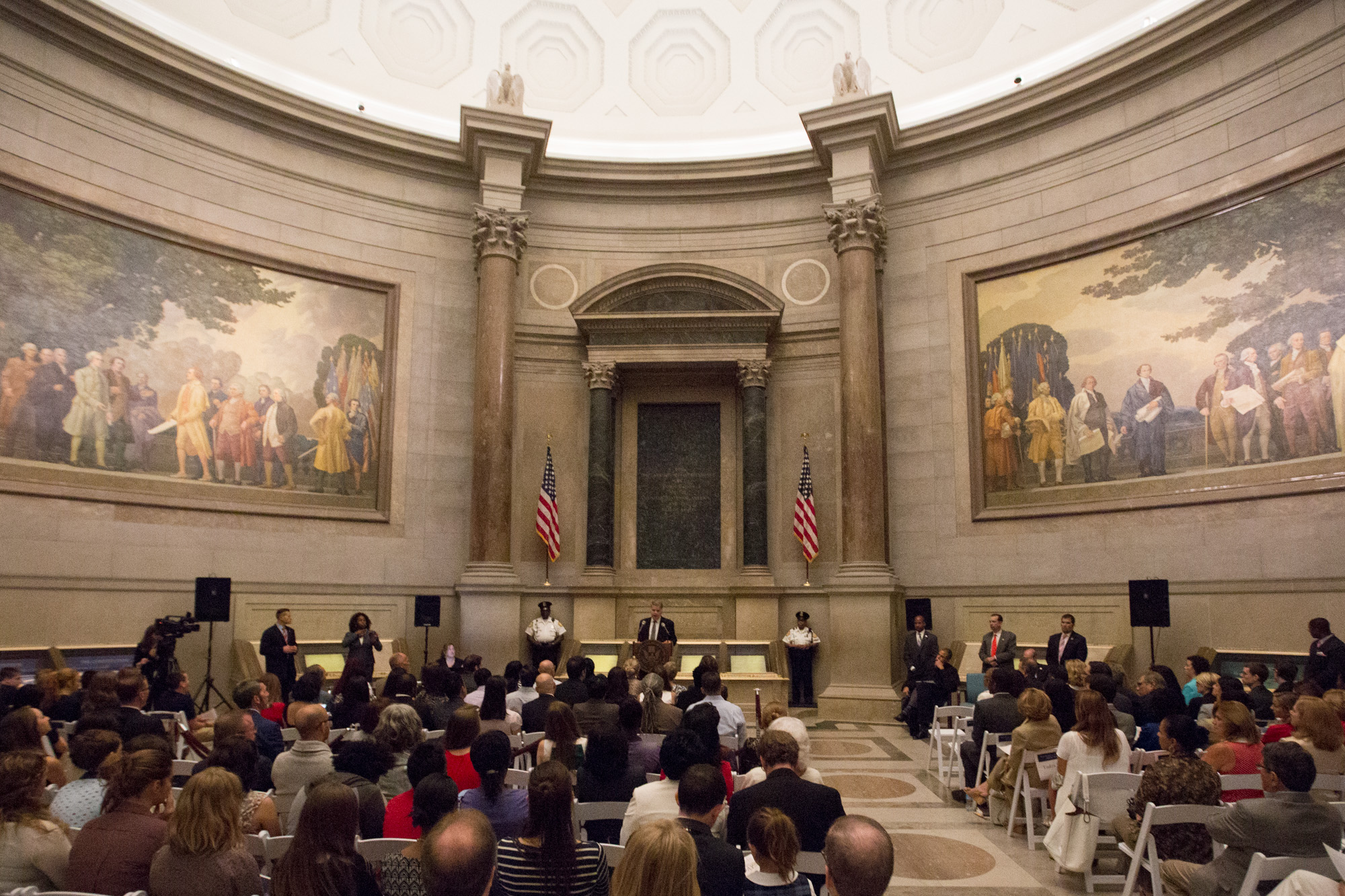
- Naturalization ceremony on September 17, 2015, in the Rotunda for the Charters of Freedom, National Archives Building, Washington, D.C.
- Observed by: United States
- Celebrations: Commemorates the formation and signing on September 17, 1787, of the United States Constitution and recognizes all who, by coming of age or by naturalization, have become citizens.
- Date: September 17
- Frequency: Annual
- Related to: I Am an American Day; Constitution Week

Constitution Day and Citizenship Day is an American federal observance that recognizes the adoption of the United States Constitution and those who have become U.S. citizens. It is normally observed on September 17, the day in 1787 that delegates to the Constitutional Convention signed the document in Philadelphia. The United States Congress designated September 17 as Constitution Day and Citizenship Day on February 29, 1952, by joint resolution (36 U.S.C. 106). It begins Constitution Week in the United States, which continues through September 23. Before this law was enacted, the holiday was known as I Am an American Day and Citizenship Day and was celebrated on the third Sunday in May.

The 1952 law was modified in 2004 with the passage of an amendment by Senator Robert Byrd to the omnibus spending bill of 2004 that mandated that all publicly funded educational institutions, and all federal agencies, provide educational programming on the history of the American Constitution on that day. In May 2005, the United States Department of Education announced the enactment of this law and that it would apply to any school receiving federal funds of any kind.

When the event falls on a weekend or on another holiday, schools and other institutions observe Constitution Day and Citizenship Day on an adjacent weekday.

== History ==
=== Origins ===
Iowa schools first recognized Constitution Day in 1911. In 1917, the Sons of the American Revolution formed a committee to promote Constitution Day. The committee included members such as Calvin Coolidge, John D. Rockefeller, and General John Pershing.

=== I Am an American Day ===
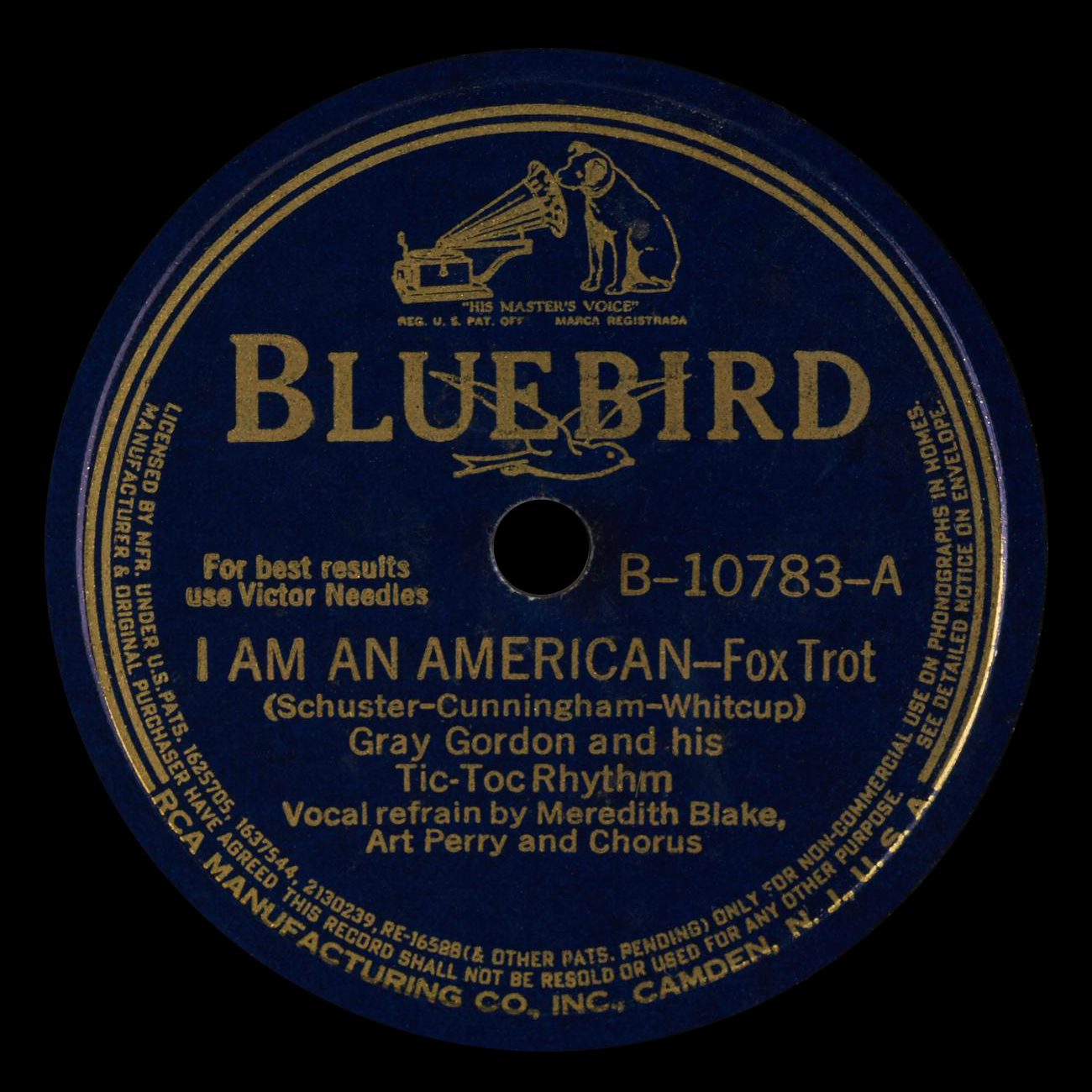
"I Am an American" was recorded by Gray Gordon and his Tic-Toc Rhythm and released on Bluebird Records in June 1940.

This day was inspired by Arthur Pine, the head of a public relations firm in New York City bearing his name. At the New York World's Fair, the composers of a new song titled "I Am an American" brought their manuscript to the attention of Pine, who handled publicity for the bandleader Gray Gordon. Pine had the song introduced on NBC, Mutual, and ABC radio, arranged for an "I Am an American Day" at the 1939 New York World's Fair, and had a local New York newspaper tie-in with "I Am an American Day" in the city. The promotion proved so successful that a newspaper chain promoted "I am an American Day" on a nationwide basis and had President Roosevelt name it as an official day. There also would be parades and celebrations.

In 1940, Congress designated the third Sunday in May as I Am an American Day. The holiday was promoted through the United States Immigration and Naturalization Service. A 16-minute film, I Am an American, was featured in American theaters as a short feature. In 1947 Hearst Newsreels featured the event on News of the Day. By 1949, governors of all 48 states had issued Constitution Day proclamations. On February 29, 1952, Congress moved the "I am an American Day" observation to September 17 and renamed it "Citizenship Day".

=== Louisville, Ohio – the Constitution Town ===
Louisville, Ohio, calls itself "Constitution Town", and credits one of its own for getting the holiday national recognition. In 1952, resident Olga T. Weber petitioned municipal officials to establish Constitution Day, in honor of the creation of the US Constitution in 1787. Mayor Gerald A. Romary proclaimed September 17, 1952, as Constitution Day in the city. The following April, Weber requested that the Ohio General Assembly proclaim September 17 as statewide Constitution Day. Her request was signed into law by Governor Frank J. Lausche. In August 1953, she took her case to the United States Senate, which passed a resolution designating September 17–23 as Constitution Week. The Senate and House approved her request and it was signed into law by President Dwight D. Eisenhower. On April 15, 1957, the City Council of Louisville declared the city Constitution Town. The Ohio State Archaeological and Historical Society later donated four historical markers, located at the four main entrances to the city, explaining Louisville's role as originator of Constitution Day.

=== First U.S. Congressional designation of Citizenship Day ===
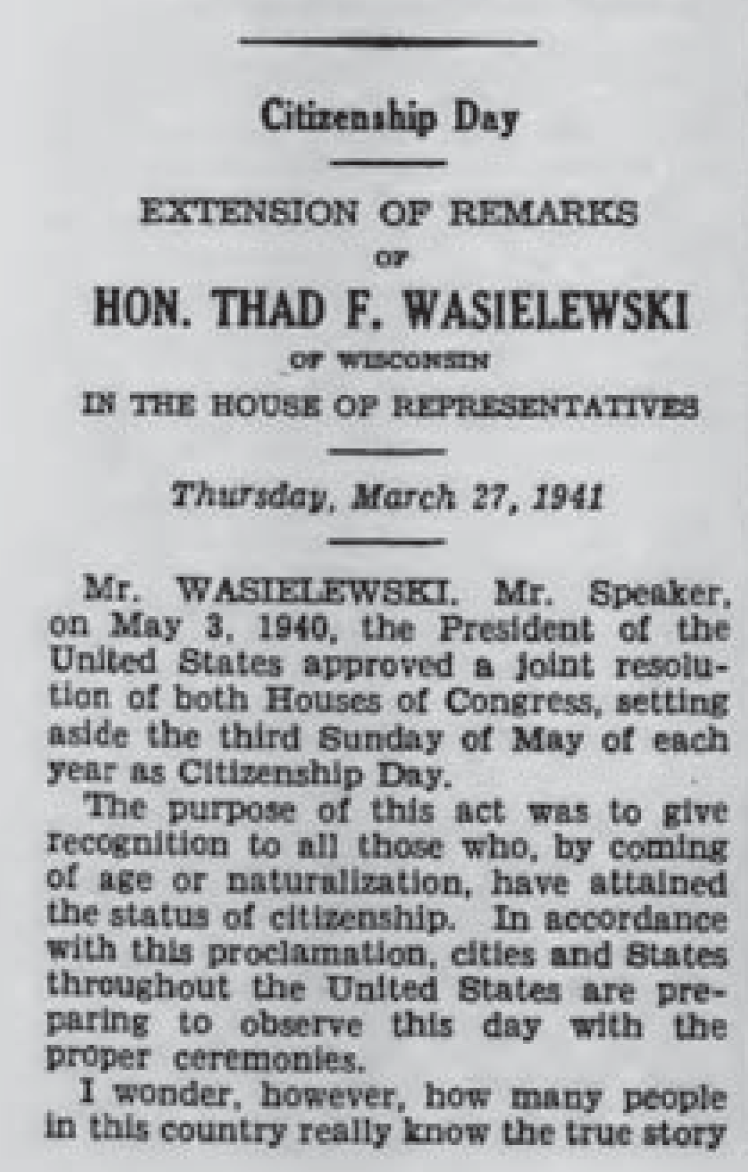
Congressional Record H1941, Appendix to CR p. A1473

Mrs. A.B. (Clara) Vajda, a Hungarian immigrant to the United States, was recognized in the U.S. Congressional Record as the Founder of Citizenship Day on March 27, 1941. In his remarks, Rep. Thad Wasielewski of Wisconsin noted "...on May 3, 1940, the President of the United States approved a joint resolution of both Houses of Congress, setting aside the third Sunday of May of each year as Citizenship Day. The purpose of this Act was to give recognition to all those who, by coming of age or naturalization, have attained the status of citizenship...I wonder how many people in this country really know the true story of the origin of this day. I wonder how many people know that a simple act of charity of a foreign-born citizen was the motivating spark which has set in motion this movement to teach all citizens to appreciate the great honor and privilege which has been bestowed upon them when they assume their sovereign rights of citizenship."

=== Reaffirmation ===
President Donald Trump reaffirmed September 17, 2017, as Constitution Day and Citizenship Day.

== See also ==
- Constitution Week
- Founding Fathers of the United States
- Holidays of the United States
- Constitution Day (other countries)
