= Mimi Levin Lieber =

American sociologist (1928–2021)

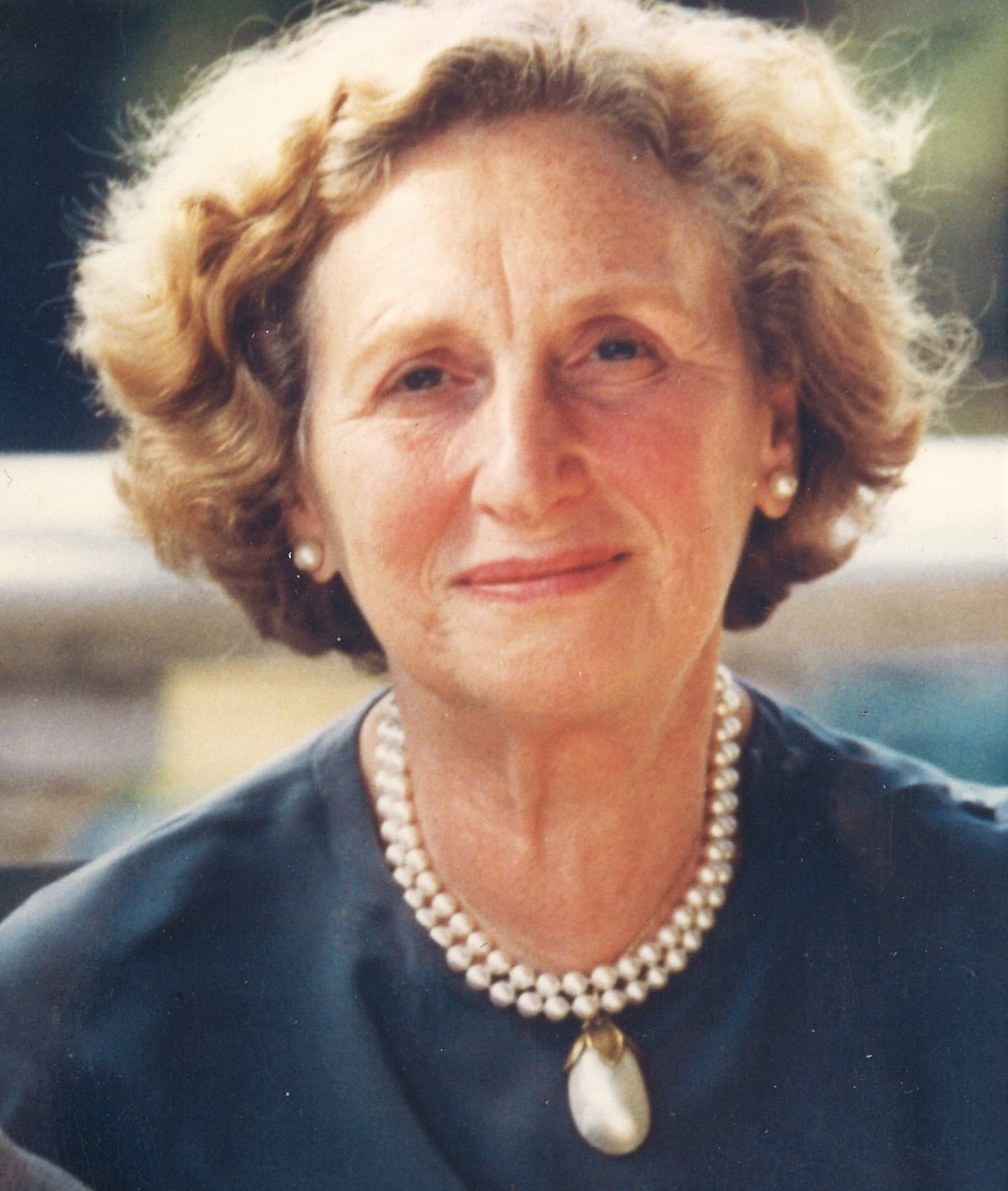
- Lieber in 1991
- Born: Miriam Leah Levin; March 22, 1928; Detroit, Michigan
- Died: October 16, 2021 (aged 93); New York, New York
- Burial place: Chatham, New York
- Education: University of Chicago (BA, MA)
- Occupation: Sociologist
- Board member of: New York State Board of Regents, New York City Community Planning Board 7, Literacy, Inc., Outward Bound
- Spouse: Charles D. Lieber
- Children: Janno Lieber, James E. Lieber, Theo Lieber, Angie Lieber
- Parent(s): Theodore Levin, Rhoda Katzin
- Relatives: Carl Levin, Sander Levin, Andy Levin, Stephen Levin
- Family: Siblings: Charles Levin, Daniel Levin, Joseph Levin

Mimi Levin Lieber (March 22, 1928 – October 16, 2021), born Miriam Leah Levin, was a sociologist who developed new techniques in consumer attitude research. As a member of the New York State Board of Regents, she became a significant figure in shaping elementary education policy in New York. Much of her early professional career focused on targeted forms of behavioral economic research. Analysis and interview methods developed by Lieber and her contemporaries helped lay the groundwork for modern integrated marketing tools, such as focus groups and opinion polling. Later in life, Lieber turned her efforts toward children's literacy advocacy, most notably in her founding of Literacy Inc.

== Early life and education ==
Lieber was born in Detroit, Michigan, the daughter of Rhoda (Katzin) and Theodore Levin, a United States district judge of the United States District Court for the Eastern District of Michigan. The family lived on LaSalle Boulevard in Detroit, a predominantly Jewish neighborhood where her father, before becoming a judge, worked in private practice as an attorney. Her father helped Jewish immigrants obtain entry and citizenship after the Immigration Act of 1924 dramatically increased barriers to entry into the United States. She graduated from Central High School in Detroit in 1945, and received her BA in 1948 and MA in 1951, both from the University of Chicago. Her Master's dissertation, “Women in Local Community Activities: A Participation Study”, focused on the role of community newspapers in community development. She credits her interview experiences with people in South Side Chicago for this dissertation as inspiration for her later work. She also earned a teaching certificate from the Laboratory School at the University of Chicago during this period.

== Career ==
Lieber's professional career coincided with the increasing influence of women, both as consumers and as advertising professionals. While this rise is often portrayed in broad strokes on shows like Mad Men, specialized consumer attitude research such as hers, is rarely depicted for its evaluative rigor, breadth, and the resulting impact it had on the culture at large. She and her contemporaries made pivotal contributions to advertising and marketing culture and helped evolve generally accepted methods within public opinion and consumer research.

Firms like Dancer Fitzgerald Sample drew from Lieber's usage and attitude studies (U&As) to roll out advertising pushes in the 1960s and 70s, such as the L'eggs pantyhose campaign, in which Lieber played a key role. These attempts to qualitatively understand consumers and their role within the marketing sector being targeted, were innovative at the time.

Lieber gained formative experience as a social science researcher for the Columbia University Bureau of Applied Social Research in the early 1950s. She continued this work in London for Dr. Mark Abrams, another seminal figure in attitude research, at Research Services Ltd. and London Press Exchange from 1953 to 1955.

In the late 1950s, at Tatham-Laird (now part of Havas Creative) in Chicago, she began to collaborate with advertising firms, drawing on her previous experience in social science. She left in 1959, after accepting an educational sociology research fellowship at the Harvard Graduate School of Education.

In 1960, she founded Lieber Attitude Research, a consumer and public opinion research organization in New York. The company provided opinion research to clients such as Citibank, Bristol-Meyers, Clairol, Hanes, Procter & Gamble, and several advertising agencies up until 1987, when it was acquired by Temple, Barker & Sloane (now part of Oliver Wyman)

== Public service and literacy advocacy ==
While active in New York community affairs in the 1970s, including as a member of New York's Community Planning Board 7, Lieber increased her public service and philanthropic efforts in various forms after selling her firm. Serving on the New York State Board of Regents from 1981 to 1996, she worked within that organization to prioritize elementary school reform throughout New York State. During her time on the Board of Regents, Lieber organized task forces to revamp school finance and administration practices, help redirect funds to underserved districts, and to rethink school completion strategies.

In 1996, after her retirement from the Board of Regents, she founded the educational non-profit, Literacy Inc. (LINC) in New York City to promote early childhood literacy. The organization describes Lieber as having "established Literacy Inc. as a framework to integrate community resources at a community’s disposal, while connecting these resources with cutting-edge literacy programming." Further, LINC "equips children with foundational literacy skills essential for success by empowering parents and mobilizing the community." She served as an active board member up until her death.

In establishing Literacy Inc, Lieber used early childhood education policy advocacy, venture philanthropy, and drawing on community resources to develop reading partner programs, first in New York City, and later in other urban communities. She is credited with pioneering the "Reading Everywhere" model which, alongside similar strategies by other literacy non-profits, has markedly changed the landscape of private engagement in public education.

== Family ==
Lieber married publisher Charles D. Lieber in Detroit in 1960. He became owner of Hebrew Publishing Company in 1980. They remained married until his death in 2016. The couple had four children, including Janno Lieber who was appointed acting chairman and CEO of the New York Metropolitan Transportation Authority in 2021.

Lieber's immediate and extended family have been and remain highly involved in public service and local, state, and national politics. Her father, Theodore Levin, was a United States district judge of the United States District Court for the Eastern District of Michigan. Her brother Charles Levin served as a Michigan Supreme Court Justice from 1973 to 1996. Another brother, Joseph Levin, was a candidate for a seat in the United States House of Representatives in 1974. In 1987, a third brother, Daniel Levin, and The Habitat Company which he runs were appointed receiver of the Chicago Housing Authority Scattered Site housing development program by the U.S. District Court in Chicago. Her paternal first cousin, Carl Levin, was a United States Senator from Michigan from 1979 to 2015, and another paternal first cousin, Sander Levin, was a United States representative for Michigan's 12th district from 1983 to 2019. Sander's son Andy Levin has been the United States representative for Michigan's 9th district since 2019. Another cousin, Stephen Levin, represented the 33rd District in New York's City Council from 2010 to 2021. Her uncle, David Croll, mayor of Windsor, Ontario, was the first Jewish Senator in Canada. Sister-in-law Helene White has been a United States circuit judge of the United States Court of Appeals for the Sixth Circuit since 2008 and another sister-in-law, Fay Hartog-Levin, was U.S. ambassador to The Netherlands from 2009 to 2011.
