= Theodore Levin =

American judge (1897–1970)

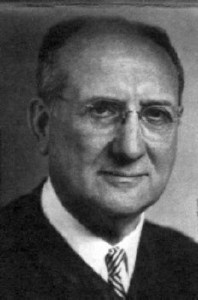

Chief Judge of the United States District Court for the Eastern District of Michigan
- In office 1959–1967
- Preceded by: Frank Albert Picard
- Succeeded by: Ralph M. Freeman

Judge of the United States District Court for the Eastern District of Michigan
- In office July 27, 1946 – December 31, 1970
- Appointed by: Harry S. Truman
- Preceded by: Edward Julien Moinet
- Succeeded by: Robert Edward DeMascio

Personal details
- Born: February 18, 1897 Chicago, Illinois
- Died: December 31, 1970 (aged 73)
- Education: University of Detroit Mercy School of Law (LL.B., LL.M.)

Theodore Levin (February 18, 1897 – December 31, 1970) was a United States district judge of the United States District Court for the Eastern District of Michigan.

== Education and career ==
Levin was born on February 18, 1897, in Chicago, Illinois, the son of Joseph and Ida (Rosin) Levin. The family moved to London, Ontario, Canada and then to Detroit, Michigan. He received a Bachelor of Laws in 1920 from the University of Detroit Law School (now the University of Detroit Mercy School of Law) and a Master of Laws in 1924 from the same institution. He was admitted to the bar in 1920 and commenced private practice in Detroit from 1920 to 1946. In 1936, he formed the law firm Levin, Levin, Garvett & Dill with his brother Saul, Morris Garvett and Louis Dill. He specialized in immigration and naturalization law.

== Federal judicial service ==
Levin was nominated by President Harry S. Truman on July 3, 1946, to a seat on the United States District Court for the Eastern District of Michigan vacated by Judge Edward Julien Moinet. He was confirmed by the United States Senate on July 25, 1946, and received his commission on July 27, 1946. He served as Chief Judge from 1959 to 1967. His service terminated on December 31, 1970, due to his death.

== Philanthropy, other service and honors ==
Levin served as president of several major Detroit organizations: the Jewish Welfare Federation of Detroit, the United Jewish Committee, the Jewish Social Service Bureau and the Resettlement Service. He was a member and served on the boards of the Detroit Community Fund, the Council of Social Agencies, the Big Brother Conference, and the United Health and Welfare Fund of Michigan. He was an active member of the Detroit Round Table of Catholics, Jews and Protestants. He was in the Scottish Rite of Free Masonry and a 33rd degree Mason. In October 1994, Congress passed legislation renaming the federal courthouse in Detroit the Theodore Levin United States Courthouse. In 1961, he received a Doctor of Laws degree from Wayne State University and in 1970, a Doctor of Humane Letters from Hebrew Union College.

== Family ==
Levin was married to Rhoda Katzin of Chicago. Their son Charles Levin served as a Michigan Supreme Court Justice from 1973 to 1996. Another son, Joseph Levin, was a candidate for a seat in the United States House of Representatives in 1974, and a third son, Daniel Levin, was a real estate developer in Chicago. His daughter Mimi Levin Lieber served on the New York State Board of Regents, and his grandson Janno Lieber is the Chairman of the New York Metropolitan Transportation Authority. His nephew Carl Levin was a former United States Senator, his nephew Sander Levin was a United States representative for Michigan's 12th District, and his great-nephew Andy Levin served as a Representative for Michigan's 9th District.

== See also ==
- List of Jewish American jurists

Legal offices
Preceded by Edward Julien Moinet	Judge of the United States District Court for the Eastern District of Michigan; 1946–1970	Succeeded by Robert Edward DeMascio
Preceded by Frank Albert Picard	Chief Judge of the United States District Court for the Eastern District of Michigan; 1959–1967	Succeeded by Ralph M. Freeman
