= Constitution Week =

American observance

- Observed by: United States
- Celebrations: Commemorates the formation and signing on September 17, 1787, of the United States Constitution and recognizes all who, by coming of age or by naturalization, have become citizens.
- Begins: September 17
- Ends: September 23
- Duration: 1 week
- Frequency: Annual
- Related to: I Am an American Day; Constitution Day and Citizenship Day

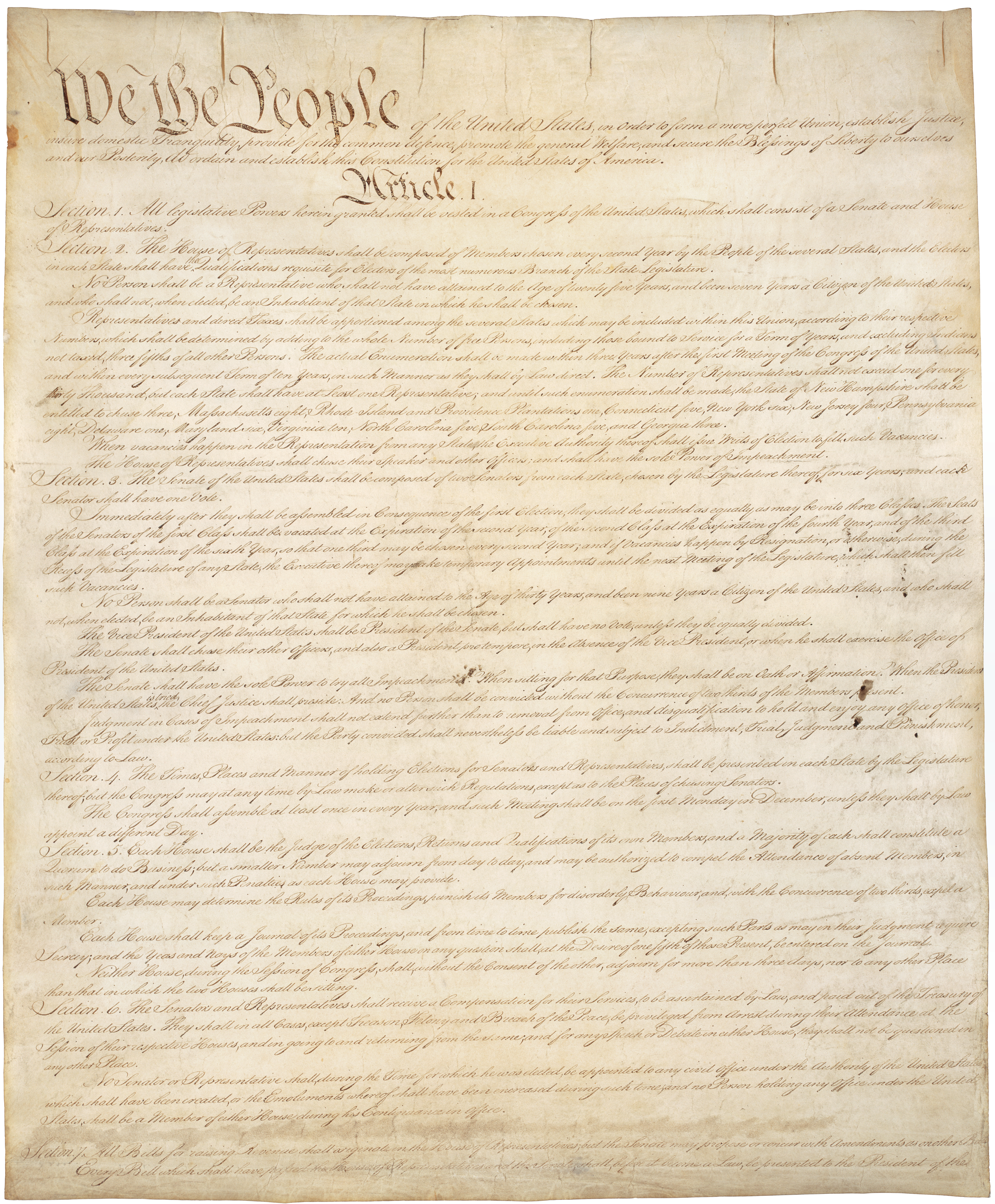
Engrossed copy of the Constitution of the United States, page one

Constitution Week is an American observance to commemorate the 1787 adoption of the United States Constitution. It runs annually from September 17 — proclaimed as Constitution Day and Citizenship Day in the United States — through September 23.

== History ==
Constitution Week was officially enacted on August 2, 1956, by President Dwight D. Eisenhower from a congressional resolution petitioned by the Daughters of the American Revolution.The tradition of issuing a Presidential Proclamation designating Constitution Week continues to this day.

== Purpose ==
The purpose of the observance week is to promote study and education about the United States Constitution which was originally adopted by the American Congress of the Confederation on September 17, 1787. Specifically, the Daughter's of the American Revolution state the purpose as:

- Emphasize citizens' responsibilities for protecting and defending the Constitution.
- Inform people that the Constitution is the basis for America's great heritage and the foundation for our way of life.
- Encourage the study of the historical events which led to the framing of the Constitution in September 1787.

== Observances ==
Many naturalization ceremonies are held during Constitution Week. In 2019, the USCIS held over 300 ceremonies in which over 30,000 people became U.S. citizens, during Constitution Week, extended by starting on September 13.

Members of the Daughters of the American Revolution observe Constitution Week by ringing bells at 4 p.m. EST on Constitution Day (Sep 17th), obtaining proclamations from public officials, creating displays in schools, libraries, courthouses, and other public areas, distributing copies of the Constitution, Preamble to the Constitution, and other patriotic literature, and other efforts to educate their community about the Constitution. Georgia College & State University, a public liberal arts university in Milledgeville, Georgia, celebrates Constitution Week every year with multiple on-campus events, including a student debate, a concert featuring music from Presidential campaigns, a keynote, a panel discussing recent Supreme Court cases, and discussions.

== See also ==
- Constitution Day and Citizenship Day
