= 19th Connecticut Infantry Regiment =

- Active: July 25, 1862 - November 23, 1863
- Country: United States
- Allegiance: Union
- Branch: Infantry

The 19th Connecticut Infantry Regiment was an infantry regiment that served in the Union Army during the American Civil War.

== Service ==
The 19th Connecticut Infantry Regiment was organized beginning July 25, 1862, and continued through September 9, 1862, at Litchfield, Connecticut, under the command of Colonel Leverette Ward Wessells.

The regiment was attached to Slough's Brigade, District of Alexandria, Defenses of Washington, to January 1863. Tyler's Command, District of Alexandria, Military District of Washington, and XXII Corps, Department of Washington, to April 1863. 2nd Brigade, DeRussy's Division, XXII Corps, to November 1863.

The 19th Connecticut Infantry ceased to exist on November 23, 1863, when it was redesignated as the 2nd Connecticut Heavy Artillery.

== Detailed service ==
Left Connecticut for Washington, D.C., September 15. Guard and patrol duty at Alexandria, Virginia, January 12, 1863. Garrison duty at Fort Worth (Virginia) in May 1863. At redoubts near Fort Lyon, November 1863. Companies B, F, and G served at Fort Ellsworth.

== Casualties ==
Casualties for the regiment during its brief time as an infantry have not been located.

== Commanders ==
- Colonel Leverette Ward Wessells
- Colonel Elisha Strong Kellogg

== See also ==
- Connecticut in the American Civil War
- List of Connecticut Civil War units
