= 4th Connecticut Infantry Regiment =

4th Connecticut Volunteer Infantry
- Active: May 21, 1861 - January 2, 1862
- Country: United States
- Allegiance: Union
- Branch: United States Army
- Type: Infantry
- Part of: 6th Brigade (Abercrombie's), 2nd Division, Department of Pennsylvania
- Engagements: American Civil War

Commanders
- Colonel: Levi Woodhouse
- Colonel: Robert O. Tyler

The 4th Connecticut Infantry Regiment was an infantry regiment that served in the Union Army during the American Civil War.

== Service ==
The 4th Connecticut Infantry Regiment was organized at Hartford, Connecticut and mustered in on May 21, 1861.

The regiment was attached to Abercrombie's 6th Brigade, 2nd Division, Department of Pennsylvania, to August 1861. 2nd Brigade, Banks' Division, Army of the Potomac, to December 1861. Defenses of Washington to January 1862.

The 4th Connecticut Infantry ceased to exist when its designation was changed to 1st Connecticut Heavy Artillery on January 2, 1862.

== Detailed service ==
Left Connecticut for Washington, D.C., June 10. Duty at Chambersburg, Pennsylvania, and at Hagerstown, Maryland, until July 4, 1861, and at Williamsport until August 16. At Frederick, Maryland, until September 5. Moved to Darnestown September 5, then to Fort Richardson. Service in the Defenses of Washington, D.C., and duty there until January 1862.

== Flag ==
The flag of the regiment was made in San Francisco by Daniel Norcross and costed around $800 with the funds coming from citizens from the state living in the city. The flag was meant for the 1st Connecticut infantry but when it arrived on July 19, 1861 to the state's Adjutant General, he instead sent it to the 4th. It was a squared American flag with 34 golden stars, at the top of pole where 3 streamers. One was blue with the word: "California." the other was white containing the word: "Connecticut."

== Commanders ==
- Colonel Robert O. Tyler

== See also ==
- Connecticut in the American Civil War
- List of Connecticut Civil War units
- 1st Connecticut Heavy Artillery
- 4th Connecticut Regiment - Revolutionary War unit with this designation
