= 22nd Connecticut Infantry Regiment =

- Active: September 20, 1862 - July 7, 1863
- Country: United States
- Allegiance: Union
- Branch: Infantry
- Engagements: Siege of Suffolk

The 22nd Connecticut Infantry Regiment was an infantry regiment that served in the Union Army during the American Civil War for nine months.

== Service ==
The 22nd Connecticut Infantry Regiment was organized at Hartford, Connecticut, on September 20, 1862, under the command of Colonel George S. Burnham.

The regiment was attached to 2nd Brigade, Abercrombie's Division, Military District of Washington, and XXII Corps, Department of Washington, to April 1863. 1st Brigade, 3rd Division, VII Corps, Department of Virginia, to May 1863. 2nd Brigade, 2nd Division, IV Corps, Department of Virginia, to July 1863.

The 22nd Connecticut Infantry mustered out of service July 7, 1863.

== Detailed service ==
The regiment left Connecticut for Washington, D.C., October 2, 1862. It then performed Picket duty at Langley's, Virginia, on Washington and Leesburg Turnpike, Defenses of Washington, D.C., until October 22, 1862. At Miner's Hill until February 12, 1863. Expedition to intercept J. E. B. Stuart's Cavalry December 29–30, 1862. Fatigue duty, building Fort Craig, Fort McDowell, and Fort McClellan, Defenses of Washington, until April 14, 1863. Moved to Suffolk, Virginia, April 14–16. Siege of Suffolk April 16-May 4. Siege of Suffolk raised May 4. Moved to West Point, York River, Virginia, May 5, and duty there until June 9. Reconnaissance to the Chickahominy June 9–10. Left Yorktown for Connecticut June 26.

== Casualties ==
The regiment lost a total of 20 enlisted men during service, all due to disease.

== Commanders ==
- Colonel George S. Burnham

== See also ==
- Connecticut in the American Civil War
- List of Connecticut Civil War units
