= 28th Connecticut Infantry Regiment =

- Active: November 15, 1862 - August 28, 1863
- Country: United States
- Allegiance: Union
- Branch: Infantry
- Engagements: Siege of Port Hudson

The 28th Connecticut Infantry Regiment was an infantry regiment that served in the Union Army during the American Civil War for nine months service.

== Service ==
The 28th Connecticut Infantry Regiment was organized at New Haven, Connecticut, on November 15, 1862, under the command of Colonel Samuel P. Ferris.

The regiment was attached to 1st Brigade, 3rd Division, XIX Corps, Department of the Gulf, to July 1863. 2nd Brigade, 3rd Division, XIX Corps, to August 1863.

The 28th Connecticut Infantry mustered out of service August 28, 1863.

== Detailed service ==
Left Connecticut for eastern New York November 17, then sailed for Ship Island, Mississippi and New Orleans, Louisiana, December 3, arriving there December 17. Duty at Camp Parapet, Carrollton, Louisiana, until February, and at Fort Barrancas, Florida, until May. Moved to Brashear City, Louisiana, May 10–12, then to Port Hudson, Louisiana, May 23–26. Siege of Port Hudson, May 26-July 9, 1863. Assaults on Port Hudson May 27 and June 14. Surrender of Port Hudson July 9. Duty at Port Hudson until August 7.

== Casualties ==
The regiment lost a total of 113 men during service; 2 officers and 14 enlisted men killed or mortally wounded, 3 officers and 94 enlisted men died of disease.

== Commanders ==
- Colonel Samuel P. Ferris

== Notable members ==
- Private Nicholas Fox, Company H - Medal of Honor recipient for action during the Siege of Port Hudson, June 14, 1863

== See also ==
- Connecticut in the American Civil War
- List of Connecticut Civil War units
