= Augusto Rodríguez (soldier) =

United States Army Lieutenant

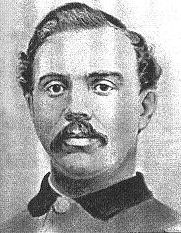
- Lieutenant Augusto Rodríguez a.k.a. "Augustus Rodereques"
- Born: 1841; San Juan, Puerto Rico
- Died: March 22, 1880; New Haven, Connecticut
- Burial place: Evergreen Cemetery, New Haven, Connecticut
- Military career
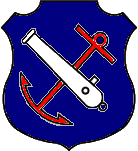
- Allegiance: United States Union Army
- Service years: 1862–1865
- Rank: Lieutenant
- Nickname: "Gustave"
- Unit: 15th Connecticut Volunteer Infantry
- Conflicts: American Civil War; *Battle of Fredericksburg; *Battle of Wyse Fork
- Other work: New Haven firefighter

Lieutenant Augusto Rodríguez (1841 – March 22, 1880), was a Puerto Rican who served as an officer in the Union Army during the American Civil War. Rodríguez served in the defenses of Washington, D.C., and led his men in the Battles of Fredericksburg and Wyse Fork.

== Early years ==
Augusto Rodríguez was born in San Juan, Puerto Rico, when the island was a Spanish province. He emigrated with his family to the United States in the 1850s. The 1860 census of New Haven, Connecticut, shows there were 10 Puerto Ricans living there, amongst them Augusto Rodríguez, who resided in Columbus Ave. On August 20, 1862, Rodríguez, whose name was misspelled as Rodreques, (Note: Records show his surname misspelled as "Rodregues" with an "e" instead of "Rodríguez" with an "i" between the r and q .) married Miss. Eliza Hickox in New Haven; they had a daughter, Clara A.

== 19th century Puerto Rican diaspora ==
During the 19th century, commerce existed between the ports of the eastern coast of the United States and Puerto Rico. Ship records show that many Puerto Ricans traveled on ships that sailed from and to the U.S. and Puerto Rico. Many of them settled in places such as New York, Connecticut, and Massachusetts. Upon the outbreak of the American Civil War, many Puerto Ricans joined the ranks of the military armed forces. However, since Puerto Ricans were still Spanish subjects, they were inscribed as Spaniards.

== 15th Connecticut Regiment ==
On July 23, 1862, Rodríguez volunteered and joined the 15th Connecticut Volunteer Infantry. For unknown reasons his name was misspelled and listed as "Augustus Rodereques". He originally held the rank of First Sergeant of Company I. He was promoted to 2nd Lieutenant on April 12, 1864.

The 15th Connecticut was organized on August 25, 1862, in New Haven, and was also known as the "Lyon Regiment" in honor of Nathaniel Lyon, the first general officer killed in the U.S. Civil War. The Regiment left Connecticut for Washington, D.C., on August 28, and was attached to Casey's Provisional Brigade, Military District of Washington, serving in the defenses of Washington until September 17, 1862.

== Battles of Fredericksburg and Wyse Fork ==
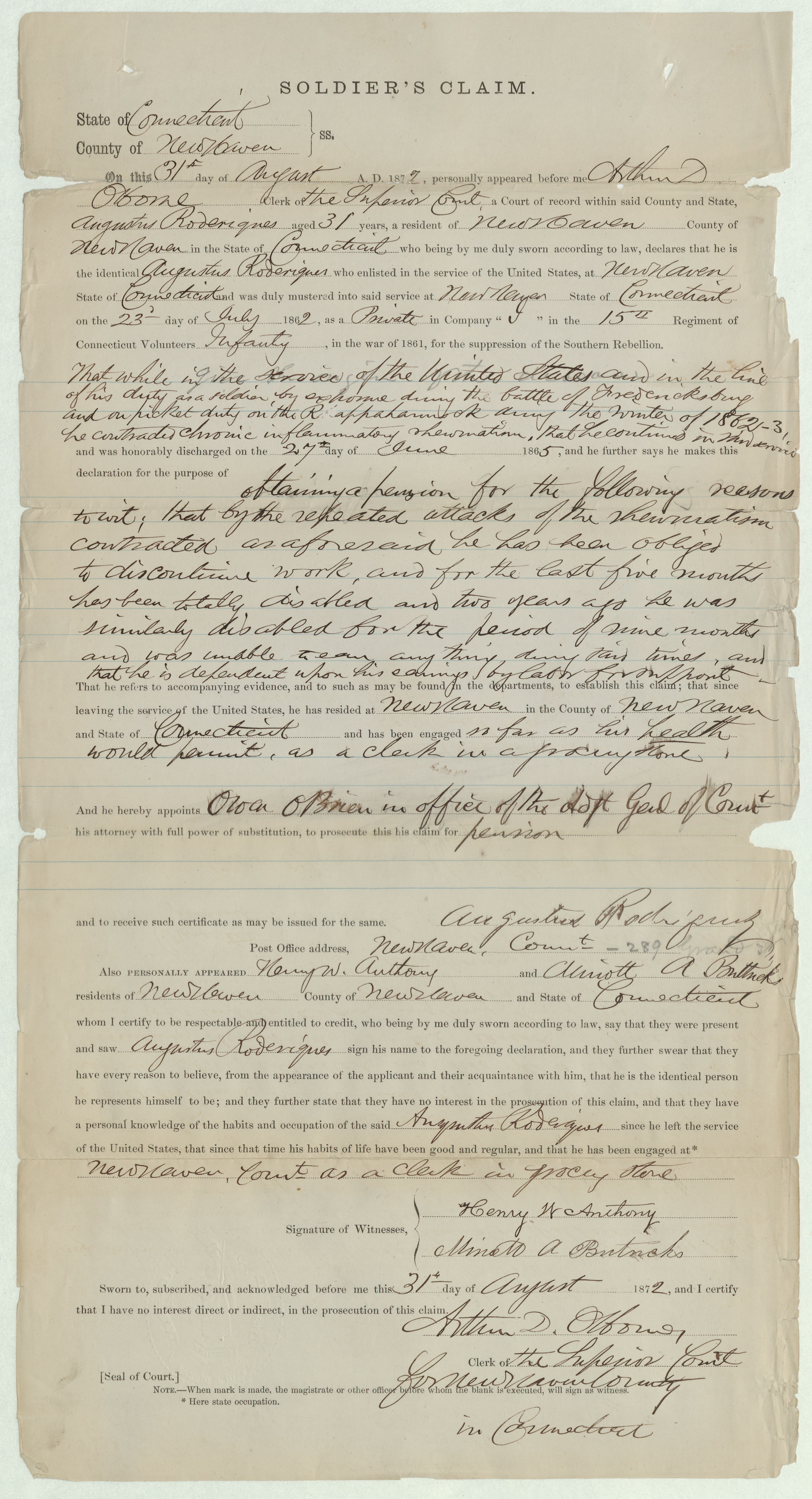
Pension claim made by Rodriguez

In December 1 through 6, the 15th Connecticut Infantry marched to Fredericksburg, Virginia, and was assigned to the 2nd Brigade, 3rd Division, IX Corps, Army of the Potomac commanded by Maj. Gen. Ambrose E. Burnside. Lieutenant Rodríguez led his men in the Battle of Fredericksburg which was fought against General Robert E. Lee's Confederate Army of Northern Virginia from December 12–15. The battle resulted in a disastrous defeat for General Burnside and the Union Army. Burnside attempted to make an offensive movement on January 20, 1863, in which Lt. Rodríguez and the men of the 15th Connecticut Regiment were involved. However the offensive, which became known as the Mud March, was aborted because of constant rain.

In March 1865, Rodríguez and the 15th Connecticut were assigned to the 2nd Brigade, 2nd Division, District of Beaufort, North Carolina, Department of North Carolina. From March 8–10, Rodríguez once more led his men in combat in the Battle of Wyse Fork, a confrontation against a Confederate army being gathered under Confederate General Joseph E. Johnston and Union troops under the command of Maj. Gen. John M. Schofield.

On the first day of the battle, Lieutenant Rodriguez, along with most of the 15th Connecticut, was surrounded and compelled to surrender. Rodriguez and his comrades were paroled on March 26. The final outcome of the battle resulted in a Union victory.

In the closing months of the war, the 15th Connecticut Infantry was assigned to provost duty as part of the garrison upon the occupation of Kinston, North Carolina, by Union forces. The regiment remained at Kinston until June 6, when it was ordered to New Bern, North Carolina, to prepare for muster-out.

== Later years ==
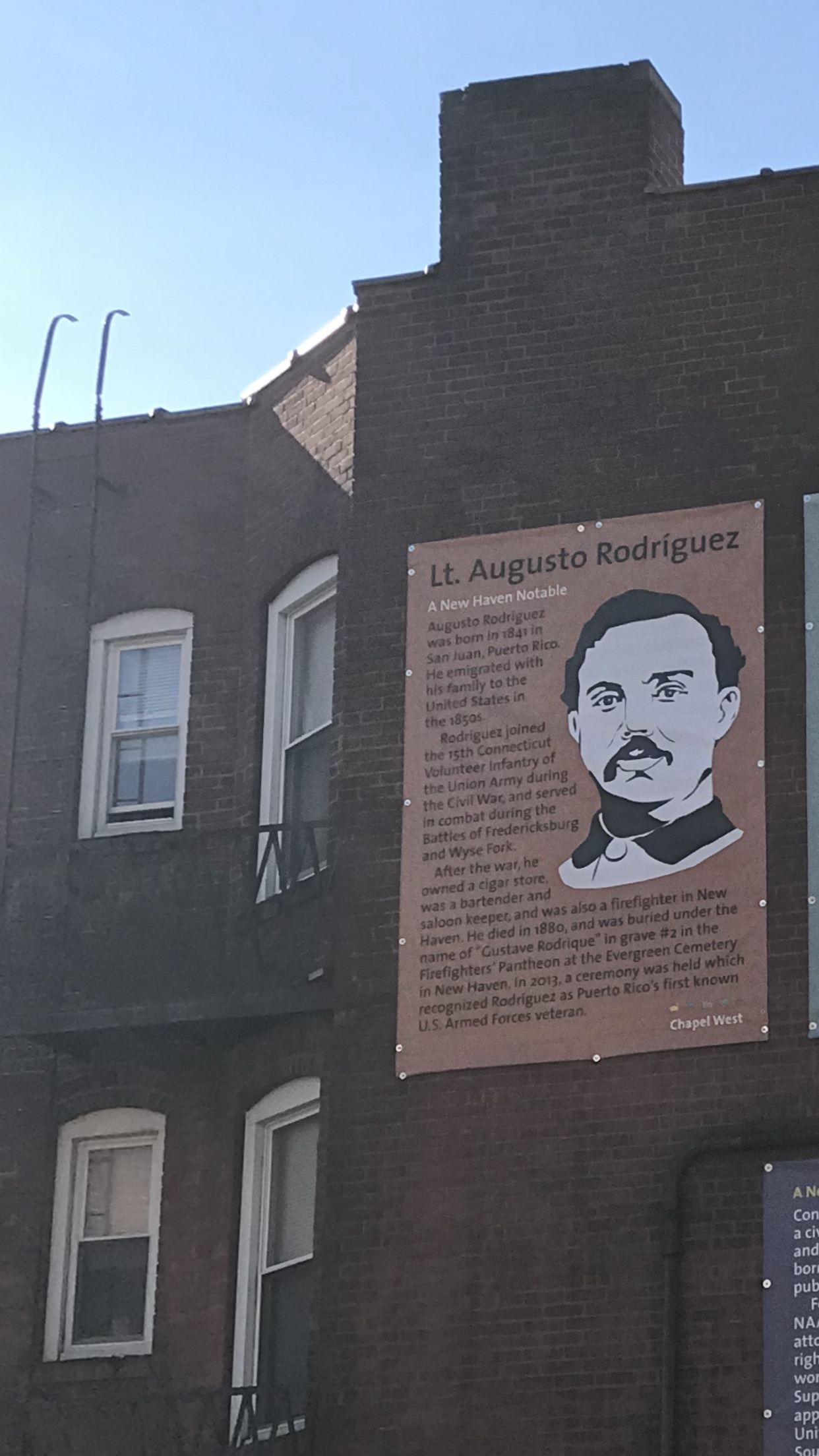
LT. Augusto Rodriguez Mural

The regiment was mustered out on June 27, 1865, and Rodríguez was discharged in New Haven on July 12, 1865. After the war Rodríguez became the proprietor of a cigar store, a bartender and saloon keeper. He was also a firefighter in New Haven. On July 3, 1873, Rodríguez applied for a disability service connected pension. According to Rodríguez, he claimed to have developed Rheumatoid arthritis during his service in the U.S. Army. He was awarded a pension of $2.00 (two dollars) a month.

He died in his home in New Haven on March 22, 1880, and was buried under the name of "Gustave Rodrique" in grave #2 in the Firefighters Pantheon at the Evergreen Cemetery in New Haven.

On Veterans Day, November 11, 2013, Rafael Cruz Miller and a group representing the Puerto Rican community in Connecticut placed a floral arrangement in a ceremony which recognized Rodriguez as Puerto Rico’s first known U.S. Armed Forces veteran.

On August 14 of 2019, Lt. Augusto Rodríguez earthly remains were exhumed from his gravesite at Firefighters Pantheon at the Evergreen Cemetery in New Haven, Connecticut. On the 15th, at one o clock in the afternoon, his earthly remains where honored with full military honor by the Puerto Rico National Guard and interred at The Puerto Rico National Cemetery. The remains where entombed in a special section of the cemetery.

A New Haven notable mural of Lt. Augusto Rodríguez could be found on Park Street, New Haven.

In 2018 Augusto Rodríguez was posthumously inducted to the Puerto Rico Veterans Hall of Fame.

== Awards and decorations ==
Augusto Rodríguez and the members of the Union Army were awarded the Army Civil War Campaign Medal for their service in the American Civil War.

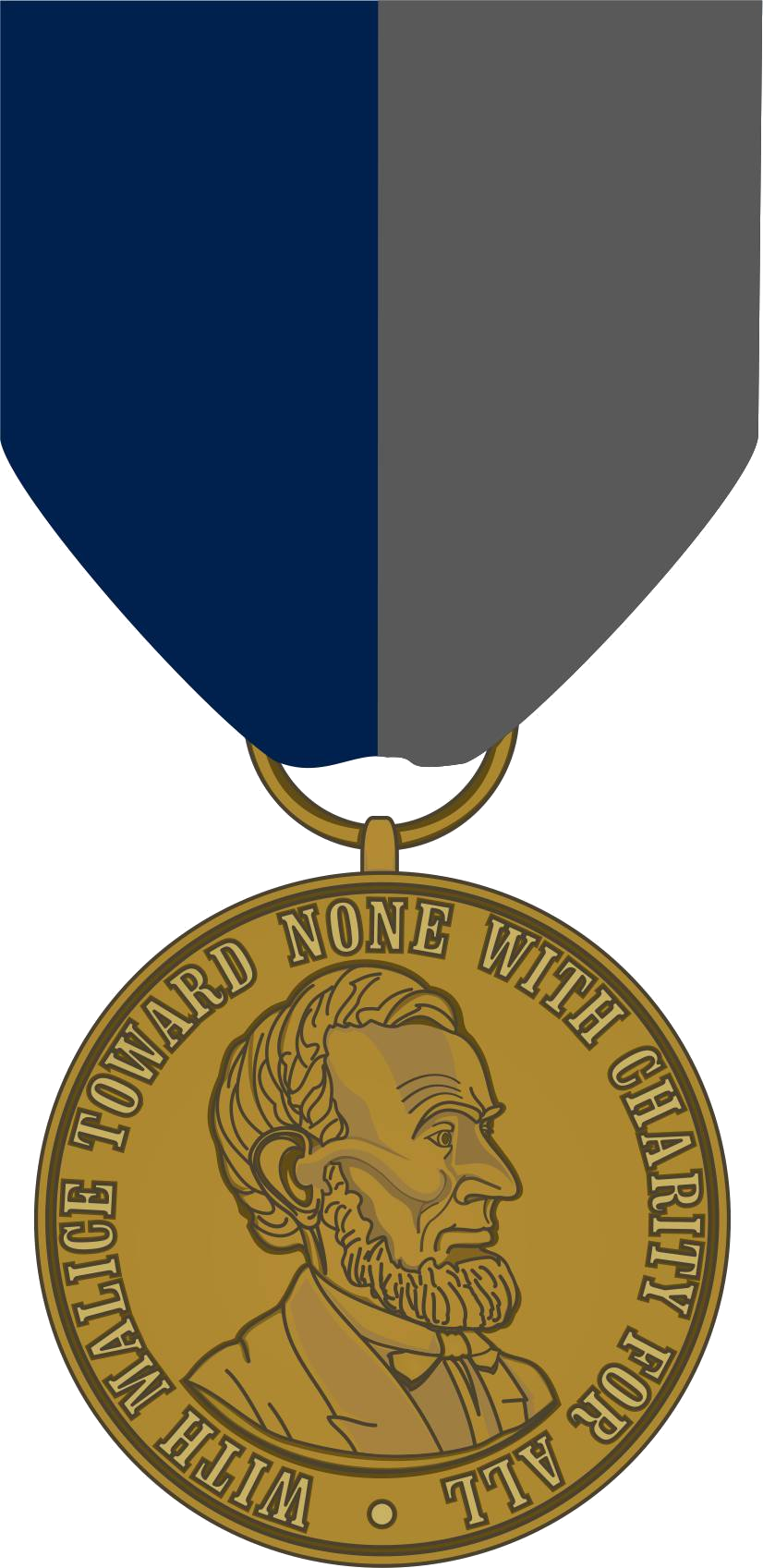
Army Civil War Campaign Medal

== See also ==
- List of Puerto Ricans
- List of Puerto Rican military personnel
- Hispanics in the American Civil War
