= 16th Connecticut Infantry Regiment =

- Founded: August 24, 1862
- Disbanded: June 24, 1865
- Country: United States
- Allegiance: Union
- Branch: Infantry
- Engagements: Maryland Campaign; Battle of Antietam; Battle of Fredericksburg; Siege of Suffolk; Battle of Plymouth; Capture of Fort Branch

The 16th Connecticut Infantry Regiment was an infantry regiment that served in the Union Army during the American Civil War.

== Service ==
The 16th Connecticut Infantry Regiment was organized at Hartford, Connecticut, on August 24, 1862.

The regiment was attached to 2nd Brigade, 3rd Division, IX Corps, Army of the Potomac, to April 1863. 2nd Brigade, 2nd Division, VII Corps, Department of Virginia, to July 1863. 2nd Brigade, Getty's Division, Portsmouth, Virginia, Department of Virginia and North Carolina, to January 1864. District of Albemarle, North Carolina, Department of Virginia and North Carolina, to April 1864. Defenses of New Bern, North Carolina, Department of Virginia and North Carolina, to January 1865. Roanoke Island, North Carolina, Department of North Carolina, to June 1865.

The 16th Connecticut Infantry mustered out of service June 24, 1865.

== Detailed service ==
Left Connecticut for Washington, D.C., August 29–31. Maryland Campaign September–October 1862. Battle of Antietam, September 16–17. Duty in Pleasant Valley, Maryland, October 27. Movement to Falmouth, Virginia, October 27 – November 17. Battle of Fredericksburg December 12–15. Burnside's 2nd Campaign, "Mud March," January 20–24, 1863. Moved to Newport News February 6–9, then to Suffolk March 13. Siege of Suffolk April 12 – May 4. Edenton Road April 24. Providence Church Road and Nansemond River May 3. Siege of Suffolk raised May 4. Reconnaissance to the Chickahominy June 9–17. Dix's Peninsula Campaign June 24 – July 7. Expedition from White House to South Anna River July 1–7. Moved to Portsmouth, Virginia. Duty there and at Norfolk, January 1864. Skirmish at Harrellsville, January 20 (detachment). Moved to Morehead City, then to New Bern and Plymouth January 24–28. Skirmish at Windsor January 30. Duty at New Bern February 2 to March 20, and at Plymouth, North Carolina, April. Siege of Plymouth April 17–20. Captured April 20, and prisoners of war March 1865. Those not captured on duty at New Bern and Roanoke Island, North Carolina, June 1865.

== Casualties ==
The regiment lost a total of 325 men during service; 6 officers and 76 enlisted men killed or mortally wounded, 3 officers and 240 enlisted men died of disease, including 154 who died as prisoners of war in Confederate hands.

== Commanders ==
- Colonel Francis Beach
- Captain Charles L. Upham - commanded at the Battle of Fredericksburg

== See also ==
- Connecticut in the American Civil War
- List of Connecticut Civil War units
