= 23rd Connecticut Infantry Regiment =

- Active: November 14, 1862 - August 31, 1863
- Country: United States
- Allegiance: Union
- Branch: Infantry
- Engagements: Battle of LaFourche Crossing

The 23rd Connecticut Infantry Regiment was an infantry regiment that served in the Union Army during the American Civil War for nine months service.

== Service ==
The 23rd Connecticut Infantry Regiment was organized at Hartford, Connecticut, on November 14, 1862.

The regiment was attached the Defenses of New Orleans and District of La Fourche, Department of the Gulf.

The 23rd Connecticut Infantry mustered out of service August 31, 1863.

== Detailed service ==
Left Connecticut for eastern New York November 17, then sailed for Ship Island, Mississippi, and New Orleans, Louisiana, November 29, arriving there December 17. (Part of the regiment did not reach New Orleans until January 16, 1863, having been stranded on the Bahama Islands.) Duty at Camp Parapet, Defenses of New Orleans, until January 11, 1863. Moved to Algiers January 11, then to Berwick Bay. Provost duty at Brashear City until February 9. Duty along Opelousas Railroad from Berwick Bay to Jefferson, with headquarters at La Fourche, until June, at following points: Company D at Jefferson, Company G at St. Charles, Company F at Boutte Station, Company C at Bayou Des Allemands, Company H at Raceland, Company B at La Fourche until April 1, then at Napoleonville, Terre Bonne, Company K at Tigersville, Company A at Bayou Boeuf until March 1, then moved to Bayou Des Allemands and to Labadieville April 1, Company E at Bayou Romans until March 1, Companies E and I at La Fourche March 1. Duty at these points until June. Company A moved to Bayou Boeuf June 16, and Companies B and E to La Fourche. Other companies moved to Brashear City. Action at Berwick June 1 (Companies C, I, G, and K). Regiment moved to La Fourche Crossing June 16. Action at La Fourche Crossing June 20–21. Bayou Boeuf June 22–23. Brashear City June 23. Companies A, C, and H captured June 23; paroled June 26. Regiment on guard duty in lowlands of Louisiana until August.

== Casualties ==
The regiment lost a total of 59 men during service; 1 officer and 10 enlisted men killed or mortally wounded, 2 officers and 46 enlisted men died of disease.

== See also ==
- Connecticut in the American Civil War
- List of Connecticut Civil War units
