= 3rd Connecticut Infantry Regiment =

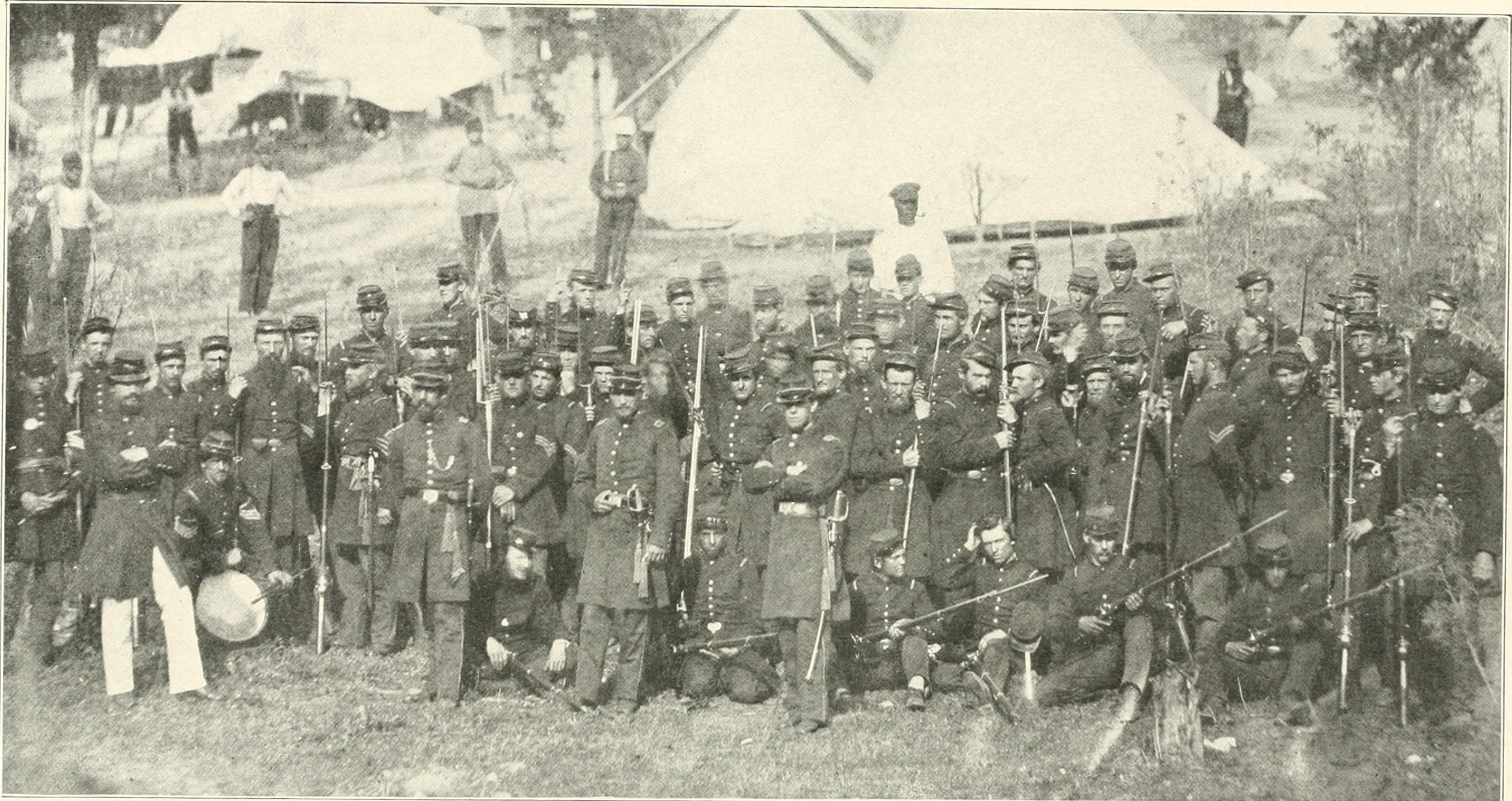
- 3rd Connecticut at Camp Douglas, 1861
- Active: May 14, 1861, to August 12, 1861
- Country: United States
- Allegiance: Union
- Branch: Infantry
- Engagements: First Battle of Bull Run

The 3rd Connecticut Infantry Regiment was an infantry regiment that served in the Union Army during the American Civil War.

== Service ==
The 3rd Connecticut Infantry Regiment was organized at New Haven, Connecticut and mustered in for three-months service on May 14, 1861, under the command of Colonel John L. Chatfield. Dr. John McGregor was appointed as the regimental surgeon. The regiment was issued Model 1842 smoothbore percussion muskets from state militia stocks.

The regiment was attached to Mansfield's command, Department of Washington, to June 1861. Key's 1st Brigade, Tyler's 1st Division, McDowell's Army of Northeastern Virginia to August 1861. It fought at the Battle of Bull Run.

The 3rd Connecticut Infantry mustered out of service on August 12, 1861.

== Detailed service ==
Left Connecticut for Washington, D.C., May 19. Duty at Camp Corcoran, defenses of Washington, D.C., until June 1, 1861. Advanced to Vienna and Falls Church, Va., June 1–3, and picket duty there until July 16. Advanced to Manassas, Va., July 16–21. Occupation of Fairfax Court House July 17. Battle of Bull Run, Va., July 21.

== Commanders ==
- Colonel John L. Chatfield

== See also ==
- 3rd Connecticut Regiment - Revolutionary War unit with this designation
- Connecticut in the American Civil War
- List of Connecticut Civil War units
