= 18th Connecticut Infantry Regiment =

- Active: August 22, 1862 – June 27, 1865
- Country: United States
- Allegiance: Union
- Branch: Infantry
- Engagements: Second Battle of Winchester; Battle of New Market; Battle of Piedmont; Battle of Lynchburg; Battle of Cool Spring; Second Battle of Kernstown; Battle of Berryville

The 18th Connecticut Infantry Regiment was an infantry regiment that served in the Union Army during the American Civil War.

== Service ==
The 18th Connecticut Infantry Regiment was organized at Norwich, Connecticut, on August 22, 1862.

The regiment was attached to Defenses of Baltimore, Maryland, VIII Corps, Middle Department, to January 1863. 2nd Separate Brigade, VIII Corps, to February 1863. 2nd Brigade, 2nd Division, VIII Corps, to June 1863. Unattached, Scammon's Division, Department of West Virginia, to December 1863. 3rd Brigade, 1st Division, Department of West Virginia, to April 1864. 1st Brigade, 1st Division, Department of West Virginia, to July 1864. 2nd Brigade, 1st Division, Department of West Virginia, to October 1864. New Haven, Connecticut, to November 1864. 1st Brigade, 3rd Division, Department of West Virginia, to April 1865. 1st Brigade, 2nd Division, Department of West Virginia, to June 1865.

The 18th Connecticut Infantry mustered out of service June 27, 1865, at Harpers Ferry, West Virginia.

== Detailed service ==
The regiment left Connecticut for Baltimore, Maryland, August 22. Duty at Forts McHenry and Marshall, Defenses of Baltimore, May 1863. Moved to Winchester, Virginia, and joined Robert H. Milroy's command May 22. Battle of Winchester June 13–15, where the regiment was mostly captured June 15. Paroled July 2 and exchanged October 1, 1863. Moved to Martinsburg, Virginia, to join those not captured. Provost duty at Hagerstown, Maryland, September 30, and at Martinsburg March 1864. At Bolivar Heights March 7–28. Reconnaissance toward Snicker's Gap March 16–18. On furlough March 28 – April 9. Sigel's Expedition from Martinsburg to New Market April 29-May 17. Battle of New Market May 15. Hunter's Expedition to Lynchburg May 26-July 1. Advance on Staunton May 26-June 5. Action at Piedmont, Mount Crawford, June 5. Occupation of Staunton June 6. Lynchburg June 17–18. Moved to Camp Piatt, then to Parkersburg, Cumberland, Martinsburg, Harpers Ferry, and Snicker's Ford July 1–18. Snicker's Ferry July 18. Battle of Kernstown, Winchester, July 24. Martinsburg July 25. At Charlestown, West Virginia, October, and at Martinsburg October 1–29. Moved to New Haven, Conn., and duty at Conscript Camp November 11. Moved to Martinsburg, West Virginia, November 11–13, then to Halltown November 23, and duty there March 1865 and at Martinsburg June.

== Casualties ==
The regiment lost a total of 152 men during service; 4 officers and 67 enlisted men killed or mortally wounded, 1 officer and 80 enlisted men died of disease.

== Commanders ==
- Colonel William Grosvenor Ely
- Major Henry Peale - commanded at the Battle of New Market

== See also ==
- Connecticut in the American Civil War
- List of Connecticut Civil War units
