= 1st Connecticut Heavy Artillery Regiment =

- Active: January 2, 1862 – September 25, 1865
- Country: United States
- Allegiance: Union
- Branch: Heavy artillery
- Engagements: Peninsula Campaign; Battle of Yorktown; Battle of Hanover Court House; Seven Days Battles; Battle of Fredericksburg (Batteries B & M); Battle of Chancellorsville (Batteries B & M); Battle of Gettysburg (Batteries B & M); Battle of Mine Run (Batteries B & M); Siege of Petersburg; Second Battle of Petersburg; Battle of the Crater; Second Battle of Fort Fisher; Battle of Wilmington (Batteries B, G, & L); Battle of Fort Stedman (Batteries I, K, & L); Appomattox Campaign

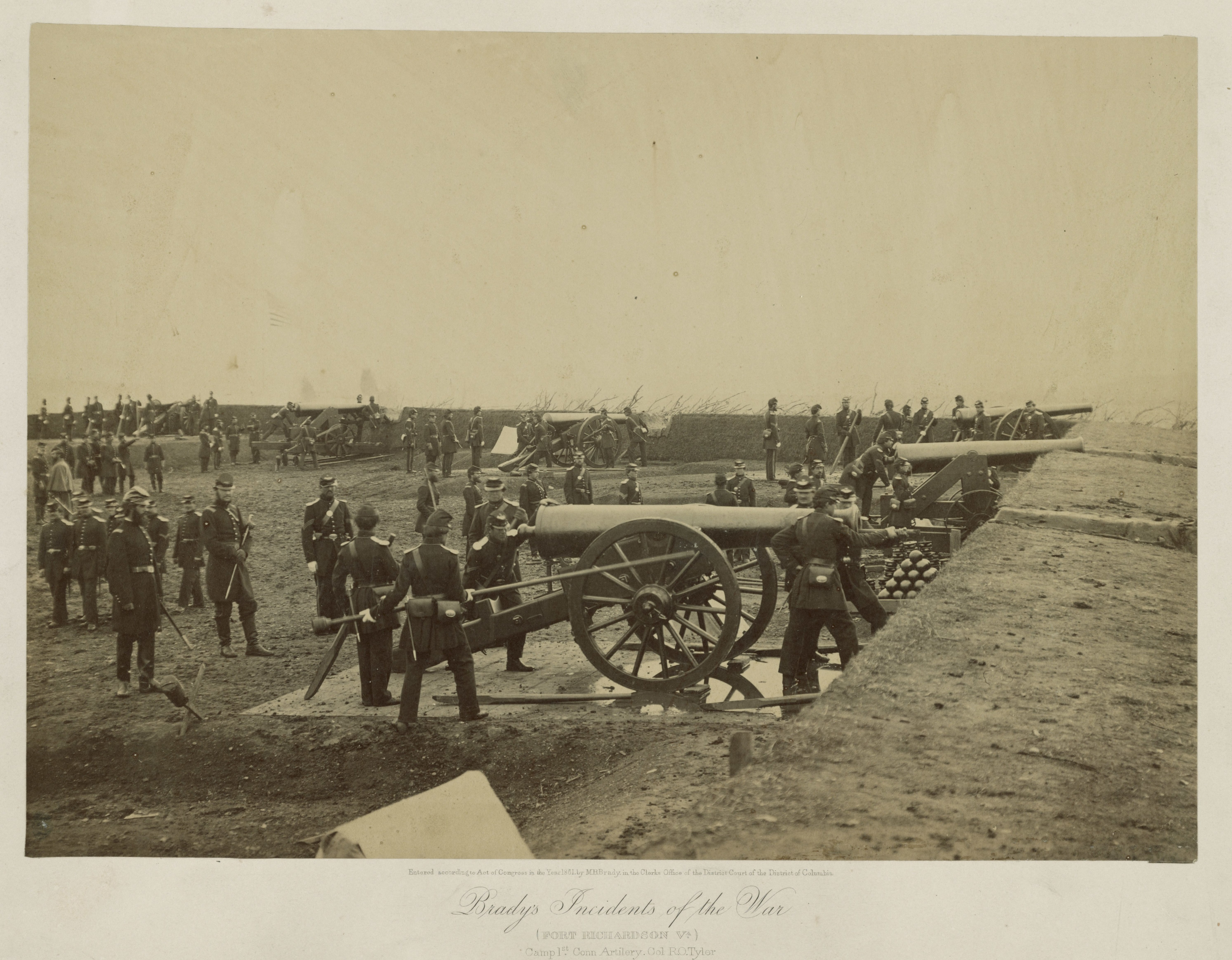
1st Connecticut Artillery, Fort Richardson, Virginia, 1861

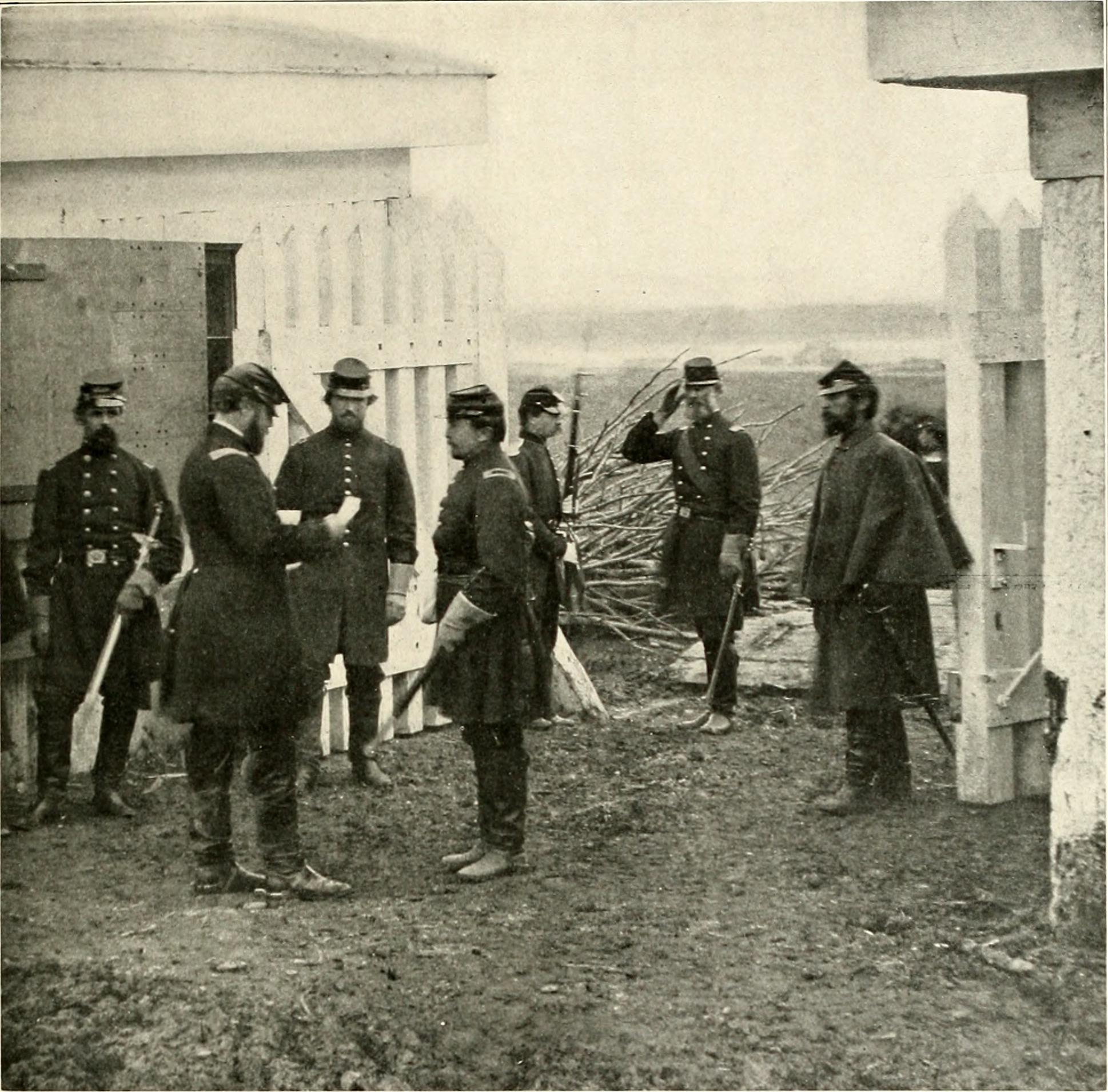
Colonel Tyler reads a dispatch at Fort Richardson, Virginia in 1862

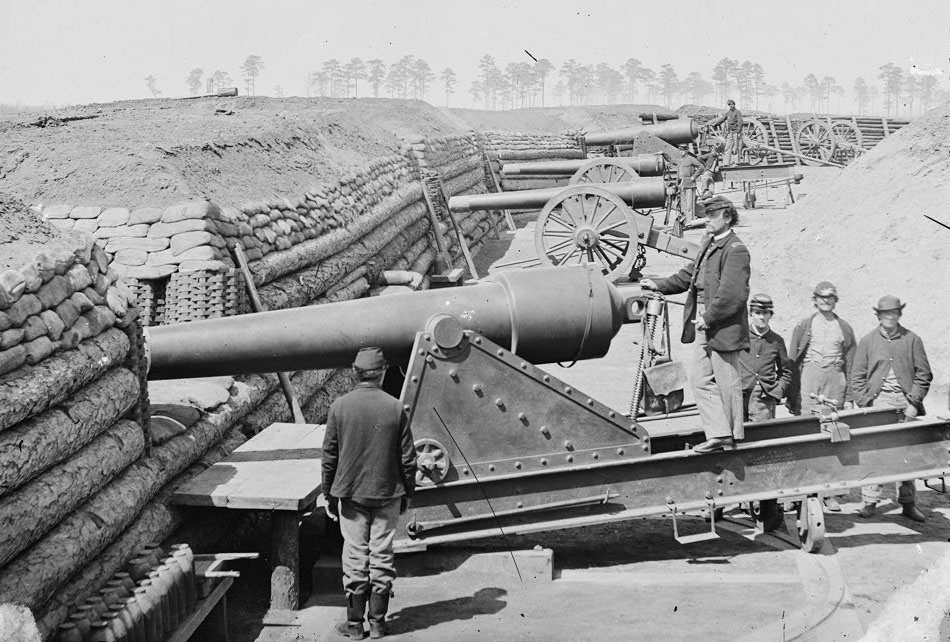
Company C, 1st Connecticut Heavy Artillery, Fort Brady, Virginia, 1864

1st Connecticut Heavy Artillery Regiment was an artillery regiment that served in the Union Army during the American Civil War.

== Service ==
The 1st Connecticut Heavy Artillery Regiment was organized in Washington, D.C., from the 4th Connecticut Volunteer Infantry and mustered on January 2, 1862, under the command of Colonel Robert O. Tyler.

The regiment was attached to the Military District of Washington to April 1862. Siege artillery, Army of the Potomac, to May 1862. 3rd Brigade, 2nd Division, V Corps, Army of the Potomac, to July 1862. Siege artillery, Army of the Potomac, to August 1862. Artillery defenses Alexandria Military District of Washington, to February 1863. Artillery defenses of Alexandria, XXII Corps, to April 1863. 2nd Brigade, DeRussy's Division, defenses south of the Potomac River, XXII Corps, to May 1863. 3rd Brigade, DeRussy's Division, XXII Corps, to December 1863. 2nd Brigade, DeRussy's Division, XXII Corps, to March 1864. 4th Brigade, DeRussy's Division, XXII Corps, to May 1864. (Batteries B and M attached to Artillery Reserve, Army of the Potomac, October 1862 to January 1864.) Point of Rocks, Virginia, Department of Virginia and North Carolina to June 1864. Siege artillery, Department of Virginia and North Carolina in the field, and siege artillery, Army of the Potomac, to May 1865. Siege artillery, Department of Virginia, to July 1865. 4th Brigade, DeRussy's Division, XXII Corps, Department of Washington, to August 1865. 3rd Brigade, Department of Washington, to September 1865.

The 1st Connecticut Heavy Artillery mustered out of the service September 25, 1865.

== Detailed service ==
Duty at Fort Richardson, defenses of Washington, D.C., until April 1862. Ordered to the Peninsula, Va., in charge of the siege train, Army of the Potomac, April 2. Siege of Yorktown April 12 – May 4. Battle of Hanover Court House May 27. Operations about Hanover Court House May 27–29. Seven days before Richmond June 25 – July 1. Gaines Mill June 27. Malvern Hill July 1. At Harrison's Landing until August 15. Moved to Alexandria, Virginia, August 16–27. Duty in the defenses of Washington, D.C., until May 1864, as garrison at Fort Richardson. Batteries B and M detached with the Army of the Potomac, participating in the Battle of Fredericksburg, December 12–15. Chancellorsville Campaign April 27 – May 6. Battle of Chancellorsville May 1–5. Stafford Heights June 12. Battle of Gettysburg, July 1–3. Bristoe Campaign October 9–22. Advance to line of the Rappahannock River November 7–8. Brandy Station, Virginia November 8. Mine Run Campaign November 26 – December 2. Rejoined regiment in defenses of Washington January 1864. Regiment ordered to Bermuda Hundred, Virginia, May 13, 1864. Engaged in fatigue duty and as garrison for batteries and forts on the Bermuda front and lines before Petersburg during siege operations against Petersburg and Richmond, May 1864 to April 1865. Occupy Fort Converse, Redoubt Dutton, Batteries Spofford, Anderson, Pruyn, and Perry on the Bermuda front, and Forts Rice, Morton, Sedgwick, and McGilvrey, and Batteries 1, 2, 3, 4, 5, 9, 10, 11, 12, 14, 15, 17, 18, 20, Burpee, Drake, and Sawyer, on the Petersburg front, and at Dutch Gap, north of the James River. Assaults on Fort Dutton June 2 and 21, 1864 (Battery L). Attacks on the lines May 18, 19, 20, 21, 25, 27, 30, 31, June 1, 2, 5, 9, 18, 20 and 23. Battle of the Crater July 30, August 25, November 17, 18 and 28, 1864. Repulse of rebel fleet at Fort Brady on James River January 23–24, 1865. Expedition to Fort Fisher, North Carolina, January 3–15, 1865 (Batteries B, G, and L). Capture of Fort Fisher January 15 (Batteries B, G, and L). Assaults on and fall of Petersburg, Virginia, April 2, 1865. Duty in the Department of Virginia until July 11. Moved to Washington, D.C., and duty in the defenses of that city until September.

== Casualties ==
The regiment lost a total of 227 men during service; 2 officers and 49 enlisted men killed or mortally wounded, 4 officers and 172 enlisted men died of disease.

== Commanders ==
- Colonel Robert O. Tyler
- Colonel Henry Larcom Abbot
- Major George Ager – commanded during the Appomattox Campaign
- Major George B. Cook – commanded during the Appomattox Campaign, after April 6

== See also ==
- Connecticut in the American Civil War
- List of Connecticut Civil War units
