= 29th Connecticut Colored Infantry Regiment =

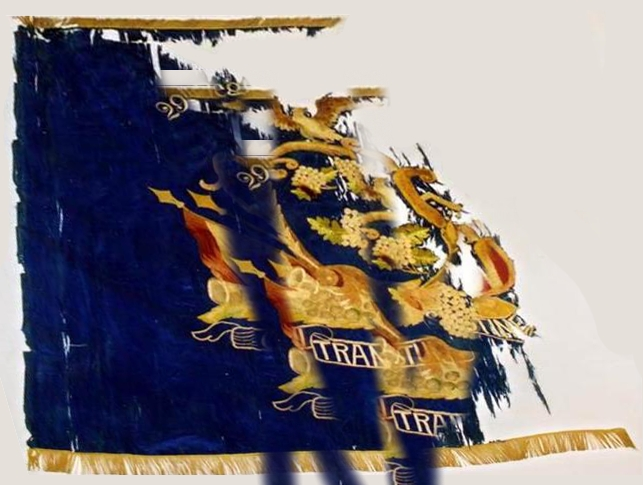
- Active: March 8, 1864 - November 25, 1865
- Country: United States
- Allegiance: Union
- Branch: Infantry
- Engagements: Siege of Petersburg; Battle of Chaffin's Farm; Second Battle of Deep Bottom; Battle of Darbytown Road; Battle of Fair Oaks & Darbytown Road; Appomattox Campaign

The 29th Connecticut Colored Infantry Regiment was an infantry regiment that served in the Union Army during the American Civil War. It is credited as being the first infantry regiment to enter Richmond, Virginia, when the city surrendered in the Siege of Petersburg.

== Service ==
The 29th Connecticut Colored Infantry Regiment was organized at Fair Haven, Connecticut and mustered on March 8, 1864, under the command of Colonel William B. Wooster. Over 1,200 volunteers were recruited, exceeding the regiments mandated strength, and 400 were used to form the 30th Connecticut Volunteer Infantry Regiment.

The regiment was attached to the District of Beaufort, Department of the South, April to August 1864. 1st Brigade, 3rd Division, X Corps, Army of the James, Department of Virginia and North Carolina, to December 1864. 2nd Brigade, 3rd Division, XXV Corps, to January 1865. 2nd Brigade, 1st Division, XXV Corps, to April 1865, District of St. Marys, XXII Corps, Department of Washington, to May 1865. 2nd Brigade, 1st Division, XXV Corps, Department of Texas, to October 1865.

The 29th Connecticut Infantry mustered out of service on October 24, 1865, and was discharged November 25, 1865, at New Haven, Connecticut.

== Detailed service ==
Left Connecticut for Annapolis, Maryland, March 19. Moved to Beaufort, South Carolina, April 8–13, and duty there until August 8. Moved from Beaufort, South Carolina, to Bermuda Hundred, Virginia, August 8–13, 1864. Siege operations against Petersburg and Richmond, August 13, 1864 to April 2, 1865. Demonstration on North Side of the James River, August 13–20, 1864. Deep Bottom, Strawberry Plains, August 14–18. Duty in the trenches before Petersburg, August 25-September 24. New Market Heights and Fort Harrison, September 28–29. Chaffin's Farm, September 29–30. Darbytown Road, October 13. Battle of Fair Oaks, October 27–28. Duty in trenches before Richmond until April 1865. Occupation of Richmond, April 3. (First infantry regiment to enter the city.) Moved to City Point April 18, then to Point Lookout, Maryland, and duty there guarding prisoners until May 28. Moved to City Point May 28–30, then sailed for Texas, June 10, arriving at Brazos, Santiago, July 3. March to Brownsville and duty there until October. At New Orleans October 27-November 11.

== Casualties ==
The regiment lost a total of 198 men during service; 1 officer and 44 enlisted men killed or mortally wounded, 1 officer and 152 enlisted men died of disease.

== Commanders ==
- Colonel William B. Wooster

== Notable enlisted men ==
James L. Saunders, one of four children born to Virginia slave trader Jourdan M. Saunders, an associate of Franklin & Armfield, and Mary Wilkins, a formerly enslaved woman of color, enlisted in the 29th Connecticut in March 1864.

== See also ==
- 29th Colored Regiment Monument
- Connecticut in the American Civil War
- List of Connecticut Civil War units

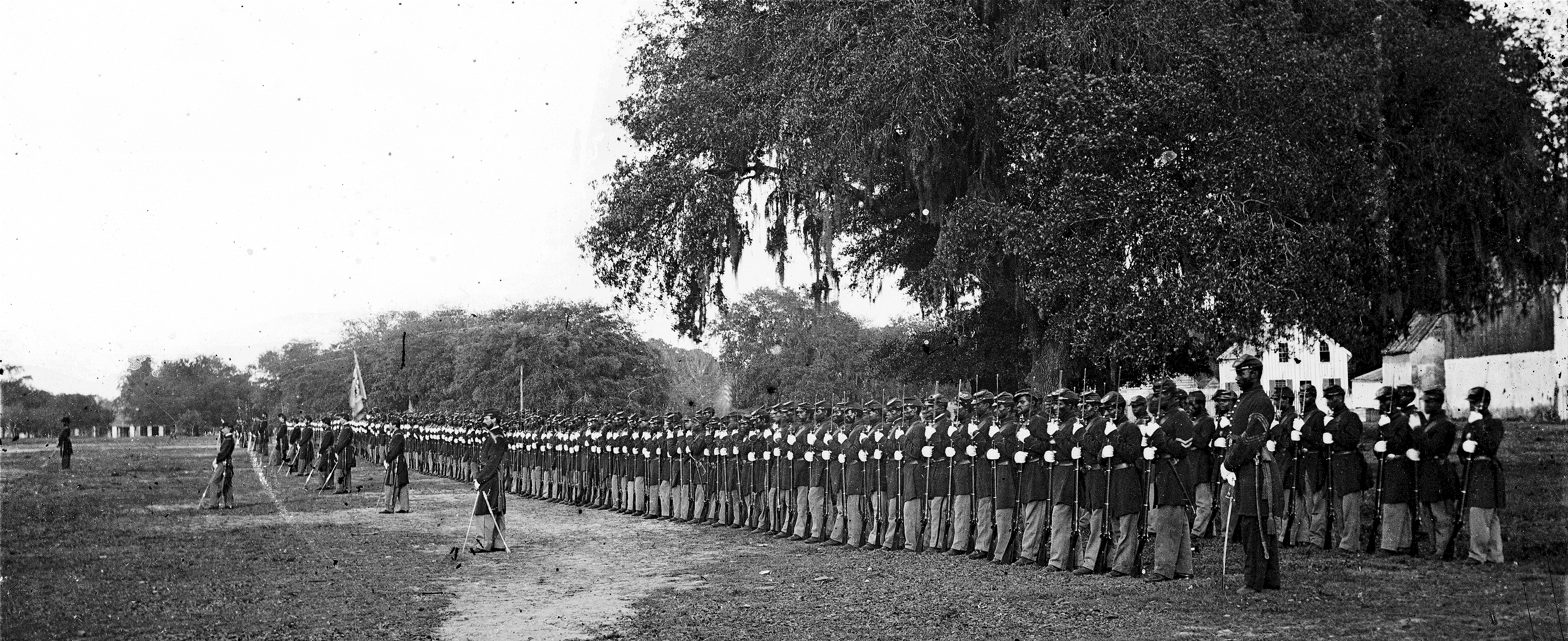
29th Connecticut Colored Infantry Regiment, Beaufort, South Carolina, 1864
