= Wesley Gibbs =

Medal of Honor recipient (1842–1917)

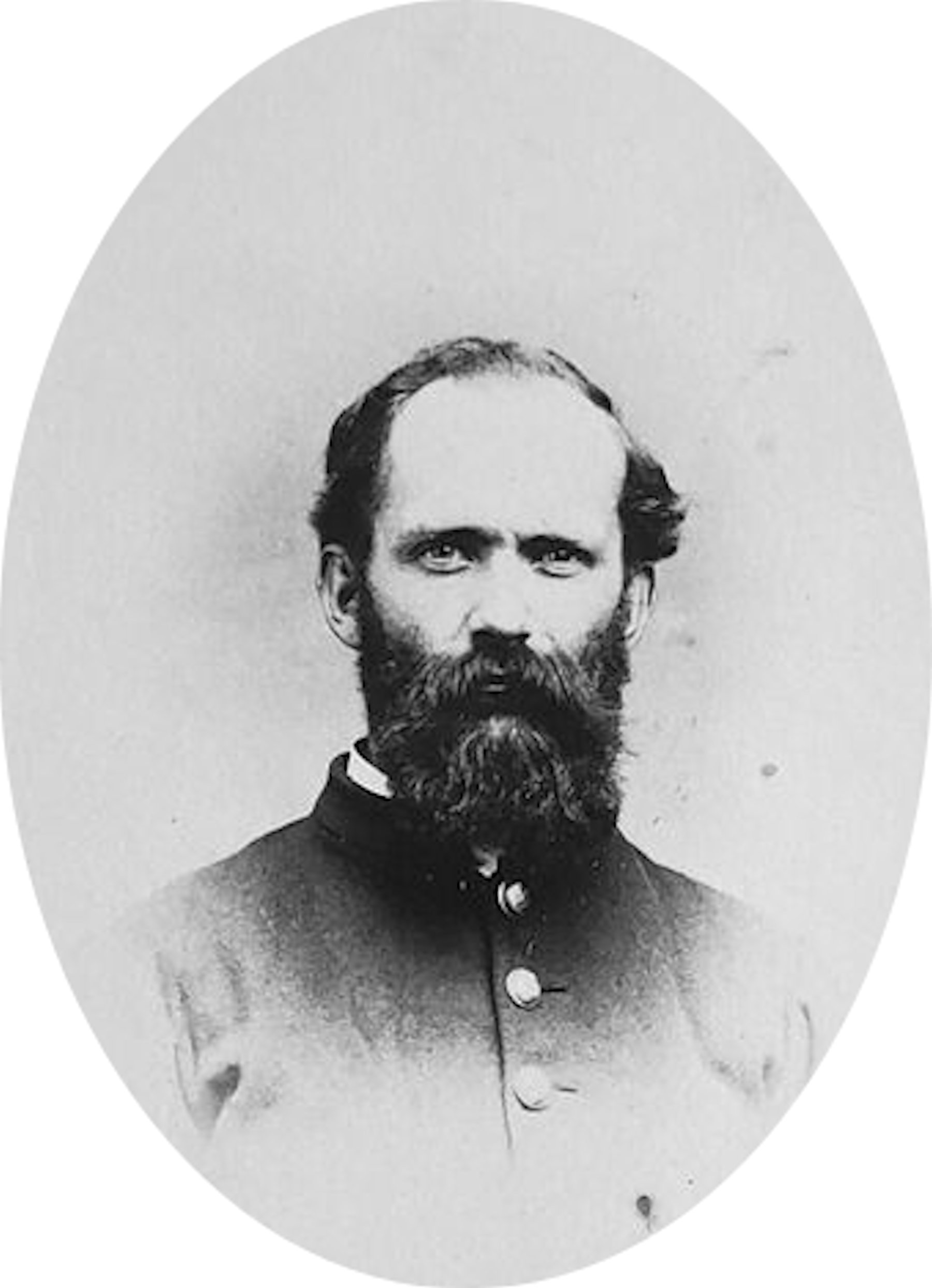
- Medal of Honor winner Wesley Gibbs
- Born: July 24, 1842; Sharon, Connecticut, US
- Died: May 29, 1917 (aged 74)
- Burial place: Winsted, Connecticut, US
- Military career
- Allegiance: United States of America
- Branch: United States Army
- Service years: 1862 - 1865
- Rank: Sergeant
- Unit: 2nd Connecticut Heavy Artillery Regiment
- Conflicts: Battle of Franklin; American Civil War
- Awards: Medal of Honor

Wesley Gibbs (July 24, 1842 - May 29, 1917) was an American soldier who fought in the American Civil War. Gibbs received the United States' highest award for bravery during combat, the Medal of Honor. Gibbs's medal was won for his capturing the flag during the Third Battle of Petersburg on April 2, 1865. He was honored with the award on May 10, 1865. Following his Medal of Honor his rank was subsequently reduced to Private, for reasons unknown.

Gibbs was born in Sharon, Connecticut. He joined the Army from Salisbury, Connecticut in August 1862, and mustered out with his regiment in August 1865. Gifford was buried in Winsted, Connecticut, at Forest View Cemetery.

== Medal of Honor citation ==
The President of the United States of America, in the name of Congress, takes pleasure in presenting the Medal of Honor to Sergeant Wesley Gibbs, United States Army, for extraordinary heroism on 2 April 1865, while serving with Company B, 2d Connecticut Heavy Artillery, in action at Petersburg, Virginia, for the capture of the flag.

== See also ==
- List of American Civil War Medal of Honor recipients: G–L
