= 3rd Connecticut Light Artillery Battery =

- Active: September 1, 1864 – July 3, 1865
- Disbanded: July 3, 1865
- Country: United States
- Allegiance: Union
- Branch: Artillery
- Size: Battery
- Engagements: American Civil War: Battle of Trent's Reach

Commanders
- Captain: Thomas S. Gilbert

The 3rd Connecticut Light Artillery Battery, recruited from Connecticut, served in the Union Army between September 1, 1864 and July 3, 1865 during the American Civil War.

== Service ==
The third light battery under the command of Captain Thomas S. Gilbert was organized at Fair Haven during the fall of 1864, some of its members enlisted for one and some for two years' service.

Several of the men had served in other organizations, particularly in the 1st Connecticut Heavy Artillery Regiment. They gradually mustered in from September 1 to October 27, leaving for the front on November 16 and arriving at Broadway Landing on the James River on the 19th. There Captain Gilbert reported his command to Brigadier General Abbott, commanding the 1st Connecticut Heavy Artillery. The Battery was assigned by detachments to garrison Nos. 2, 5, 7 and 8 defences of City Point.

Many of the men were previously inured to the service and the battery drilled constantly, the command was soon in an excellent state of discipline. On January 23, 1865, the Confederate fleet tried to pass down the James River to destroy Union base at City Point. One section of the battery with four 4.5-inch siege guns was posted in front of General Grants headquarters, where it could cover the wharves and store houses until the gunboats were driven back when it returned to the redoubts.

In the final advance on Petersburg, the three 3rd battery was left to defend the entire line. With the infantry and engineers having gone forward and while the major assault was in progress they stood by their guns ready for action if the necessity presented.

Following Robert E. Lee's surrender the battery was employed to dismantle the enemy's fortifications and remove the heavy ordinance near Chaffin's Bluff on the north side of the James. On June 23, 1865, members of the battery whose terms expired prior to October 1, was mustered out of service, returning to New Haven where they were paid and finally discharged July 3. The twenty-seven men, whose terms did not expire were transferred by order of the war department to the 1st Connecticut Heavy Artillery. Although the battery had been in service about 9 months several of its members witnessed not only the beginning of the war, but the final scenes.

== Casualties ==
Its total casualties while in service were only seven. Of these, three died of disease, two were accidentally wounded and two were discharged for disability.

== See also ==
- List of Connecticut Civil War units
