= Fort Richardson =

Fort Richardson may refer to:

- Fort Richardson (Alaska) near Anchorage
- Fort Richardson (Texas) in Jacksboro
- Fort Richardson (Arlington, Virginia) near Washington, D.C.
