= Fort Branch =

Coordinates: 35.9284°N 77.1716°W

Fort Branch was a fort built by the Confederate Army especially to defend against attacks from the Union Army along the Roanoke River in North Carolina.

The fort was originally built in 1862 along Rainbow Banks in Martin County, southeast of Hamilton, as a suitable location for defense of the Roanoke Valley. Twelve pieces of artillery were stationed at the fort to prevent Union access to the Wilmington-Weldon Railroad Bridge.

On December 12, 1864, members of the 2nd Regiment Massachusetts Volunteer Heavy Artillery, 27th Regiment Massachusetts Volunteer Infantry, 9th New Jersey Volunteer Infantry, 16th Connecticut Volunteer Infantry, 176th Regiment Pennsylvania Volunteer Infantry, Battery A of the 3rd New York Heavy Artillery Regiment, and the 12th Regiment New York Volunteer Cavalry under the command of Colonel Jones Frankle advanced towards Fort Branch. The night was bitterly cold and quite dark, which enabled the Union contingent to move easily. Colonel John Hinton, commanding officer of the fort, was caught unawares and was captured easily by Captain Samuel P. Russell of Battery A of the 3rd New York. Despite this initial success, the decision to chase down Confederate soldiers of the Weldon Junior Reserves gave Hinton's men time to regroup, and the fort was abandoned as Frankle and his men retreated back to Williamston, North Carolina.
