= 31st United States Colored Infantry Regiment =

Infantry regiment raised in New York, USA

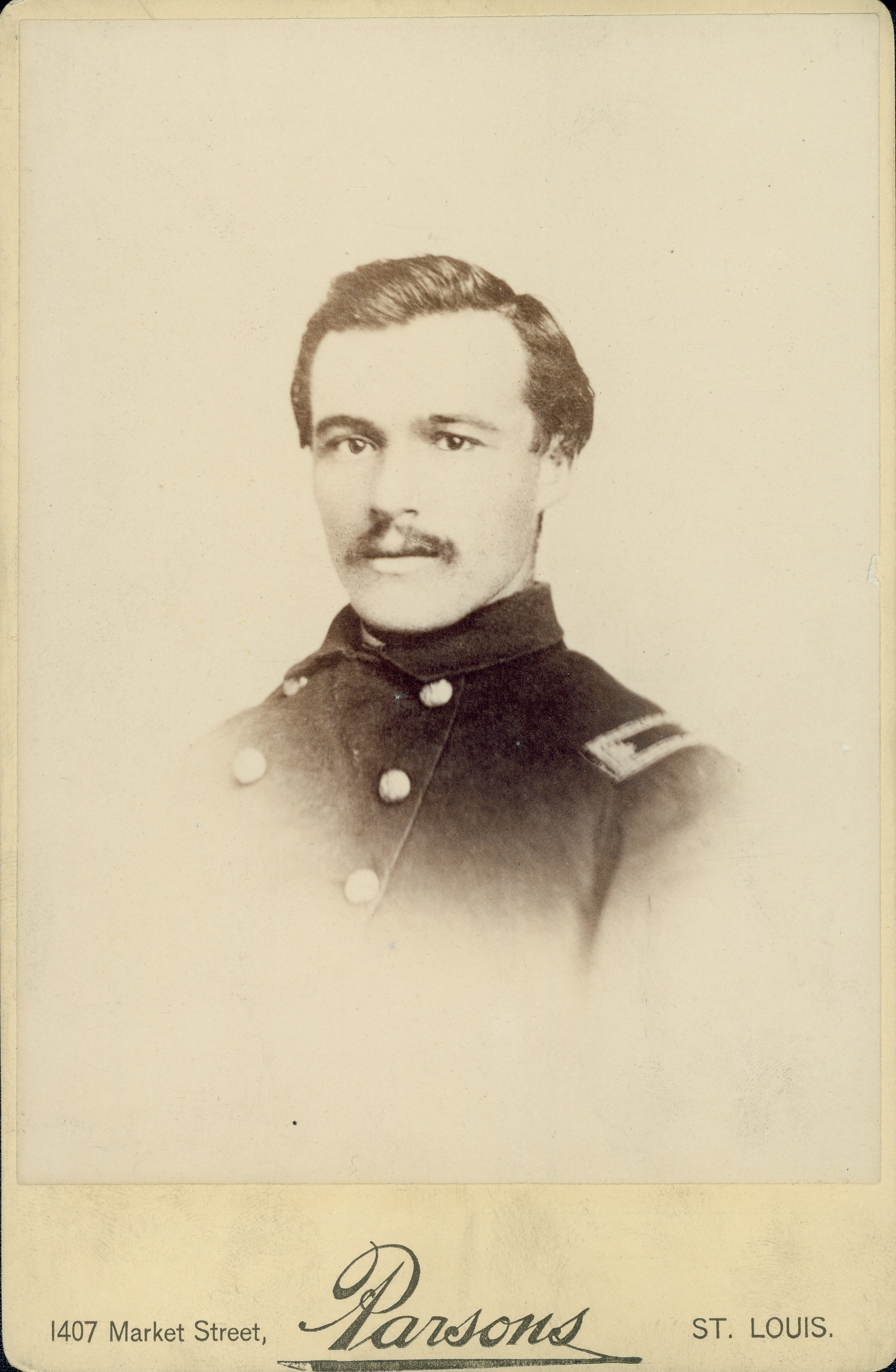
Major Thomas Wright, 31st U.S. Colored Troops

The 31st United States Colored Infantry was an infantry regiment raised in New York State during the American Civil War that recruited black soldiers.

== History ==
The 30th and 31st Connecticut Colored Infantry Regiments were raised side-by-side in the Fair Haven area of New Haven, Connecticut, where they were addressed by Frederick Douglass on 29 January 1864. The 30th Connecticut Colored Infantry Regiment was raised from 400 excess volunteers of 1,200 who had responded in the autumn and winter of 1863 to a call by Governor Buckingham for recruits to the 29th Connecticut Colored Infantry Regiment.

The 31st became active on 14 November 1864, in Virginia. The 30th was amalgamated into it on 18 May 1864. The commanding officer was Colonel Henry C. Ward. Major Thomas Wright was among its officers. Among the regiments recruits were Bermudians Robert Tappin (who had previously served in the United States Navy from 1863 to 1864), John Wilson and Joseph Thomas.

The Regiment was assigned successively to: the Middle Department (April, 1864); the 1st Brigade, 4th Division, 9th Corps, Army of the Potomac (April to November, 1864); the 1st Brigade, 1st Division, 25th Corps (November, 1864, to April, 1865); the 1st Brigade, 3rd Division, 10th Corps (April to August, 1865); and the District of New Berne, North Carolina, until it was demobilised on 7 November 1865, when its men mustered out.

From its becoming active in Virginia, it took part in the advance from the Rapidan River to the James River, then guarded trains through the Wilderness forest until June 1864. It took part in the Battle of Cold Harbor from the 2nd to the 12th of June. It took part in the sieges of Petersburg and Richmond from 16 June until 2 April. From November 1864 to March 1865, the Regiment took part in the Bermuda Hundred Campaign. It took part in the Battle of Appomattox Court House on 9 April 1865. From May to June 1865, it was assigned to the Department of Texas and posted on the Rio Grande.

The regiment lost: 2 officers and 35 enlisted men killed, 1 officer and 19 enlisted men died of wounds; 1 officer and 100 enlisted men to disease; 3 enlisted men by accidents; another 3 enlisted men drowned; 1 murdered; 1 enlisted man died of sunstroke; and 15 enlisted men died of unknown causes; 5 enlisted men died while prisoners of war.

== See also ==
- List of Connecticut Civil War units
- List of United States Colored Troops Civil War units
- William James Whipper
