= 29th Colored Regiment Monument =

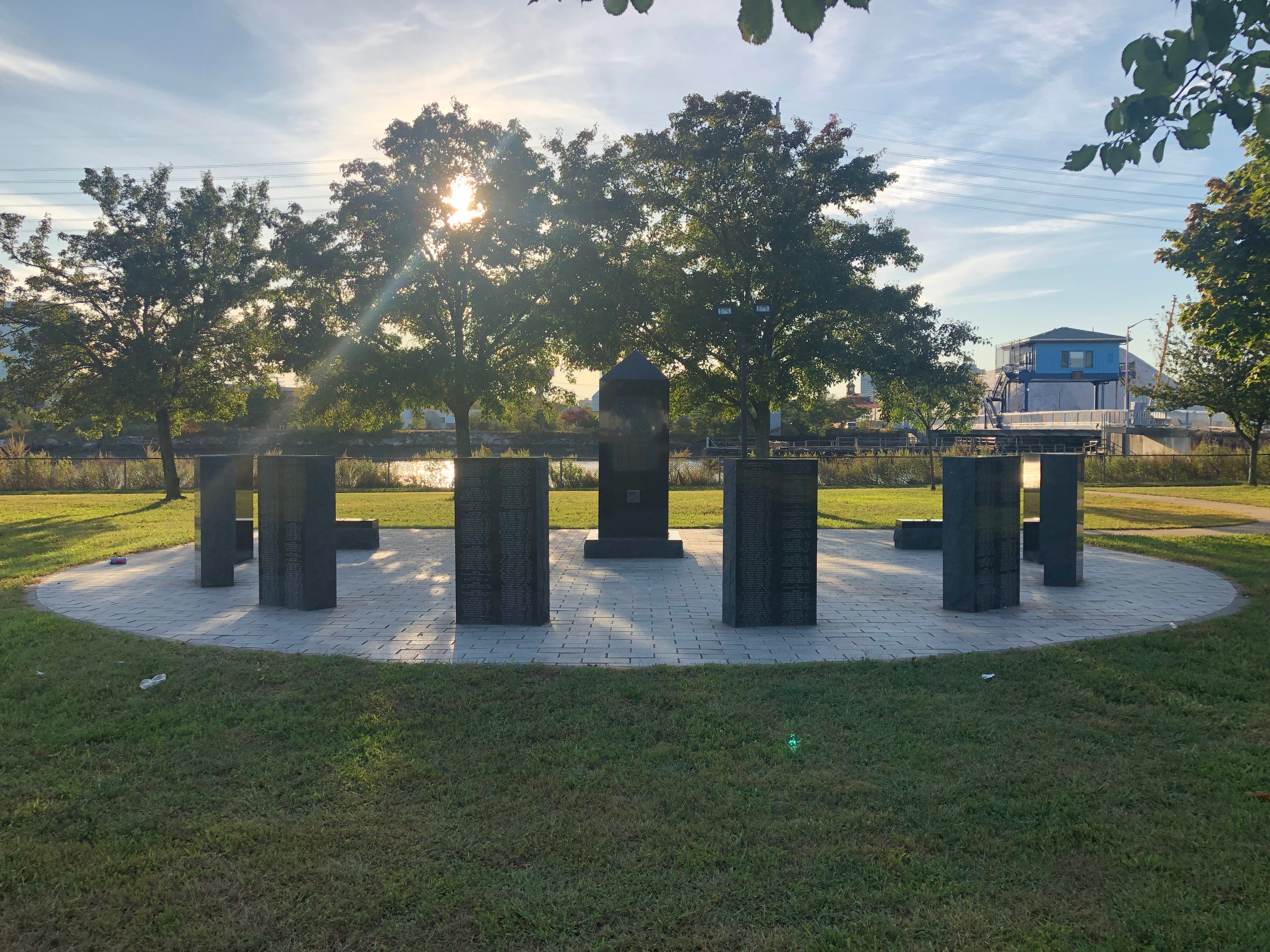
- Location: 41.3026°N 72.9035°W
- Designer: Ed Hamilton
- Dedicated date: September 2008

The 29th Colored Regiment Monument is a monument located in Criscuolo Park in New Haven, Connecticut, United States. The monument commemorates the soldiers of the 29th Connecticut Infantry Regiment (Colored) and is located on the grounds of where more than 900 black recruits trained in 1863. It was designed by Ed Hamilton, a sculptor well known for the Amistad Memorial that is also located in New Haven.

== History ==
Connecticut's 29th Colored Regiment was the first all-black regiment in Connecticut and consisted of more than 900 enlisted men who volunteered to fight in the American Civil War. Recruiting began in August 1863 and the Connecticut General Assembly passed legislation for the creation of the black regiment that would have white officers. In January 1864, the 29th Regiment was filled and mustered in Fair Haven, Connecticut in March 1864. The 29th Regiment fought in the Siege of Petersburg in Petersburg, Virginia from August 12 through September 24 and took several other actions in Virginia before arriving in Richmond, Virginia and witnessed President Abraham Lincoln's address on April 5, 1865.
