= 15th Connecticut Infantry Regiment =

United States Civil War military unit

- Active: August 25, 1862 – July 12, 1865
- Country: United States
- Allegiance: Union
- Branch: Infantry
- Engagements: Battle of Fredericksburg; Battle of Wyse Fork

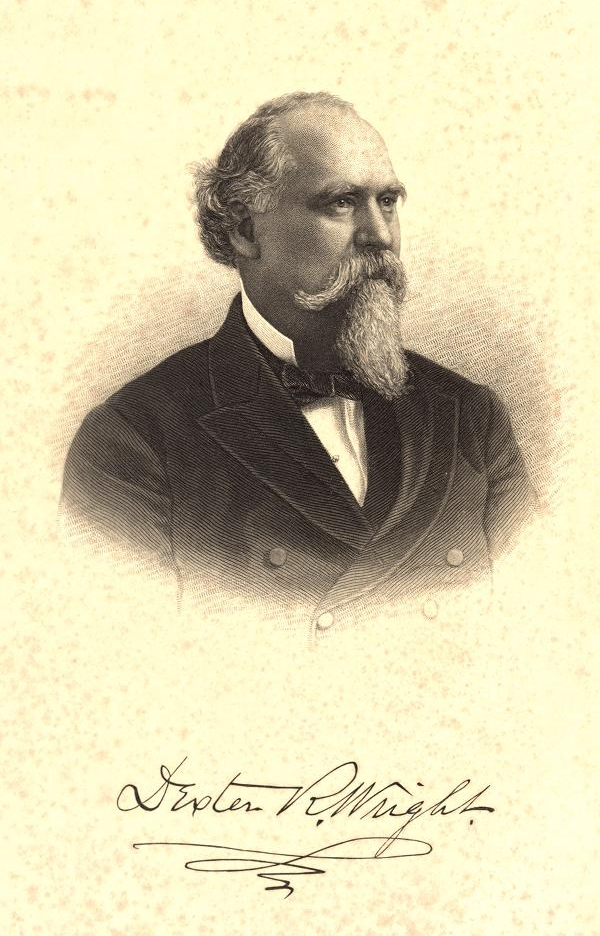
Col. Dexter R. Wright in his later years

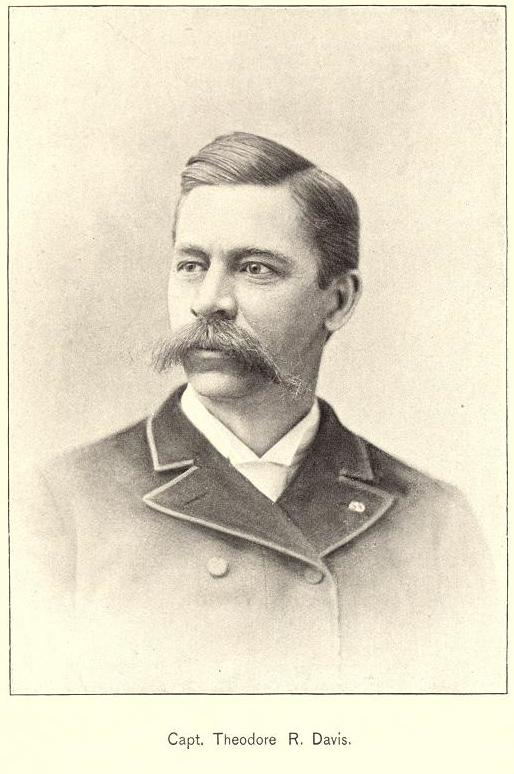
Capt. Theodore Rich Davis (1839–1890), Company B, 15th Connecticut

The 15th Connecticut Infantry Regiment was an infantry regiment that served in the Union Army during the American Civil War.

== Service ==
The 15th Connecticut Infantry Regiment was organized at New Haven, Connecticut, on August 25, 1862.

The regiment was attached to Casey's Provisional Brigade, Military District of Washington, to October 1862. 1st Brigade, Casey's Division, Military District Washington to December 1862. 2nd Brigade, 3rd Division, IX Corps, Army of the Potomac, to April 1863. 2nd Brigade, 2nd Division, VII Corps, Department of Virginia, to July 1863. 2nd Brigade, Getty's Division, Portsmouth, Virginia, Department of Virginia and North Carolina, to January 1864. District of the Albemarle, North Carolina, Department Virginia and North Carolina, to February 1864. Defenses of New Bern, North Carolina, Department of Virginia and North Carolina, to January 1865. Sub-district of New Bern, Department of North Carolina, to March 1865. 2nd Brigade, 2nd Division, District of Beaufort, North Carolina, Department of North Carolina, March 1865. 1st Brigade, 1st Division, District of Beaufort and District of New Bern, to June 1865.

The 15th Connecticut Infantry mustered out of service June 27, 1865, and was discharged July 12, 1865, at New Haven.

== Detailed service ==
Left Connecticut for Washington, D.C., August 28, 1862. Duty in the defenses of Washington, D.C., until September 17, 1862. At Arlington Heights, Virginia, November 3. At Fairfax Seminary, Va., December 1. March to Fredericksburg, Va., December 1–6. Battle of Fredericksburg December 12–15. Burnside's 2nd Campaign, "Mud March," January 20–24, 1863. Moved to Newport News, Virginia, February 6–9, then to Suffolk March 13. Siege of Suffolk April 12–May 4. Edenton Road April 24. Providence Church Road, Nansemond River, May 3. Siege of Suffolk raised May 4. Reconnaissance to the Chickahominy June 9–17. Dix's Peninsula Campaign June 24–July 7. Expedition from White House to South Anna River July 1–7. Moved to Portsmouth, Virginia, and duty there January 1864. (Five companies moved to South Mills September 20, 1863.) Skirmish Harrellsville January 20, 1864 (detachment). Moved to New Bern, North Carolina, January 21, 1864, then to Plymouth, North Carolina, January 24. Expedition up Roanoke River January 29 (detachment). Windsor January 30 (detachment). Moved to New Bern February 3 and duty there March 1865. Expedition to near Kinston June 20–23, 1864. Southwest Creek June 22. Battle of Wyse Fork, where most of the regiment was captured, March 8–10, 1865. Occupation of Kinston, North Carolina March 14. Provost duty at Kinston and at New Bern June 1865.

== Casualties ==
The regiment lost a total of 185 men during service; 4 officers and 34 enlisted men killed or mortally wounded, 5 officers and 142 enlisted men died of disease.

== Commanders ==
- Colonel Dexter R. Wright
- Lieutenant Colonel Samuel Tolles

== See also ==
- Connecticut in the American Civil War
- List of Connecticut Civil War units
