= Nicholas Fox =

American soldier in the American Civil War

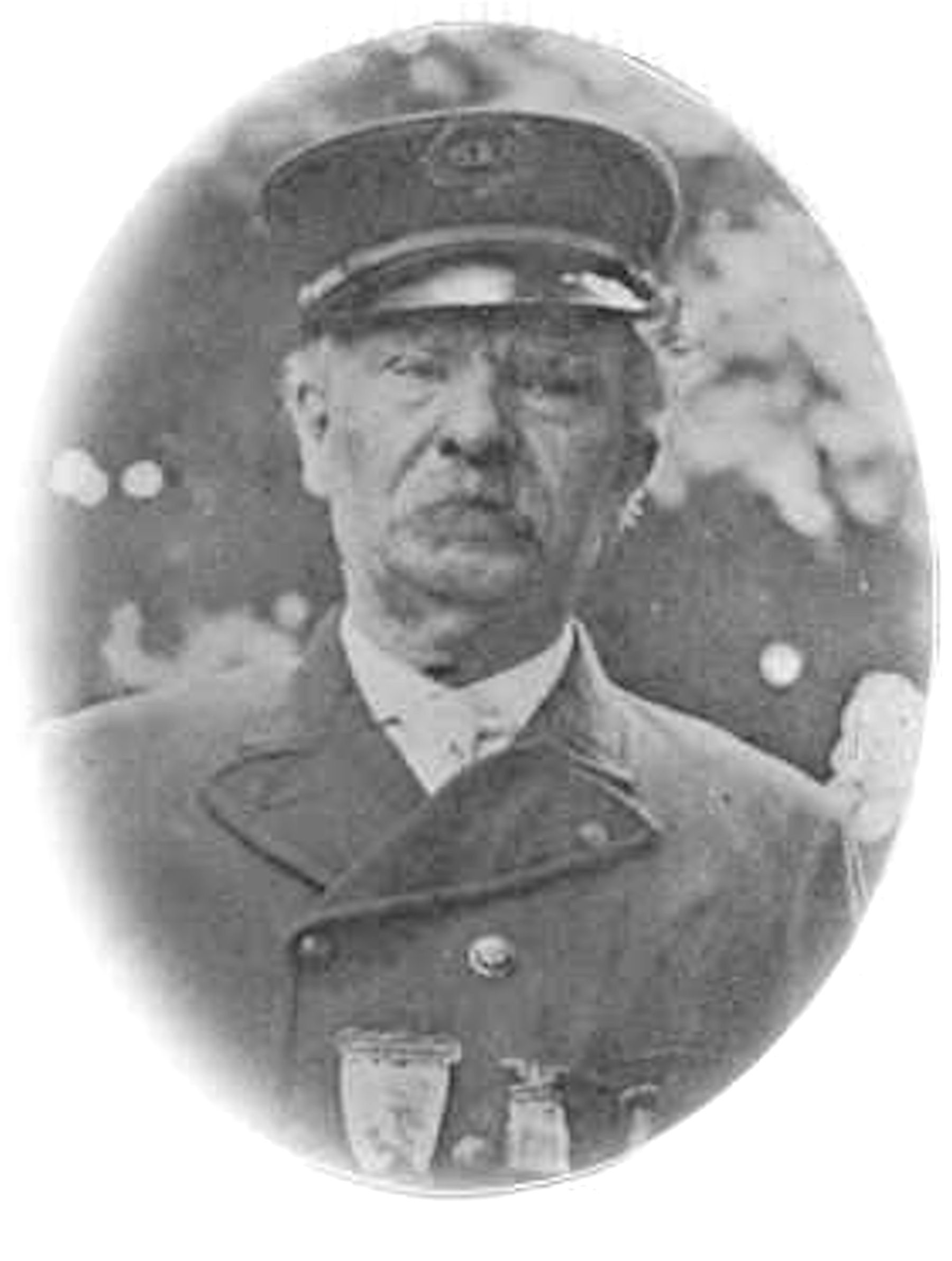
- Medal of Honor recipient Nicholas Fox c1898 wearing GAR cap
- Born: November 1844; Oldcastle, Ireland
- Died: October 2, 1929 (aged 84); Port Chester, New York, US
- Burial place: Saint Mary's Cemetery; Rye Brook, New York, US
- Military career
- Allegiance: United States; Union
- Branch: United States Army; Union Army
- Rank: Private
- Units: Company H, 28th Connecticut Volunteer Infantry Regiment
- Conflicts: Siege of Port Hudson
- Awards: Medal of Honor

Nicholas Fox (November 1844 – October 2, 1929) was an American soldier who fought in the American Civil War. Fox received the United States' highest award for bravery during combat, the Medal of Honor, for his action during the siege of Port Hudson in Louisiana on June 14, 1863. He was honored with the award on April 1, 1898.

== Biography ==
Fox was born in Oldcastle, Ireland, in November 1844. While the exact date of his birth is uncertain, he was baptized on November 5, 1844, in the Roman Catholic church in Oldcastle. In 1855, the family emigrated to the United States on the ship Rappahannock, arriving in New York City on May 23, 1855. By the time of the 1860 United States census, they had settled in Greenwich, Connecticut. He enlisted in the 28th Connecticut Infantry Regiment. By 1890, he and his wife, Catherine Simcox, had settled in Port Chester, New York, where they raised twelve children. Fox worked for the R.B. & W. Bolt Works all his life, eventually becoming a superintendent. He died on October 2, 1929, and his remains are interred at Saint Mary's Cemetery in Rye Brook, New York.

== Medal of Honor citation ==
"At Port Hudson, La., June 15th, 1863, this soldier, then a private in Company H., 28th Connecticut Volunteers, participated in the assault on the enemy's works, but the troops were repulsed, leaving between the lines many wounded who were helpless and exposed to the enemy's fire and the heat of the sun. After several men had been killed in attempting to relieve the sufferings of the wounded, Fox volunteered to carry water to them, and loading himself with canteens made two trips in plain view and under the hot fire of the enemy, his act being praised at the time by his brigade commander."

— Port Chester [N.Y.] Journal, Thursday, 7 April 1898, page 1.

=== Citation ===
The President of the United States of America, in the name of Congress, takes pleasure in presenting the Medal of Honor to Private Nicholas Fox, United States Army, for extraordinary heroism on 14 June 1863, while serving with Company H, 28th Connecticut Infantry, in action at Port Hudson, Louisiana. Private Fox made two trips across an open space, in the face of the enemy's concentrated fire, and secured water for the sick and wounded.

== See also ==
- List of American Civil War Medal of Honor recipients: A–F
