= Daniel Tyler =

American general and manufacturer (1799–1882)

Daniel P. Tyler IV
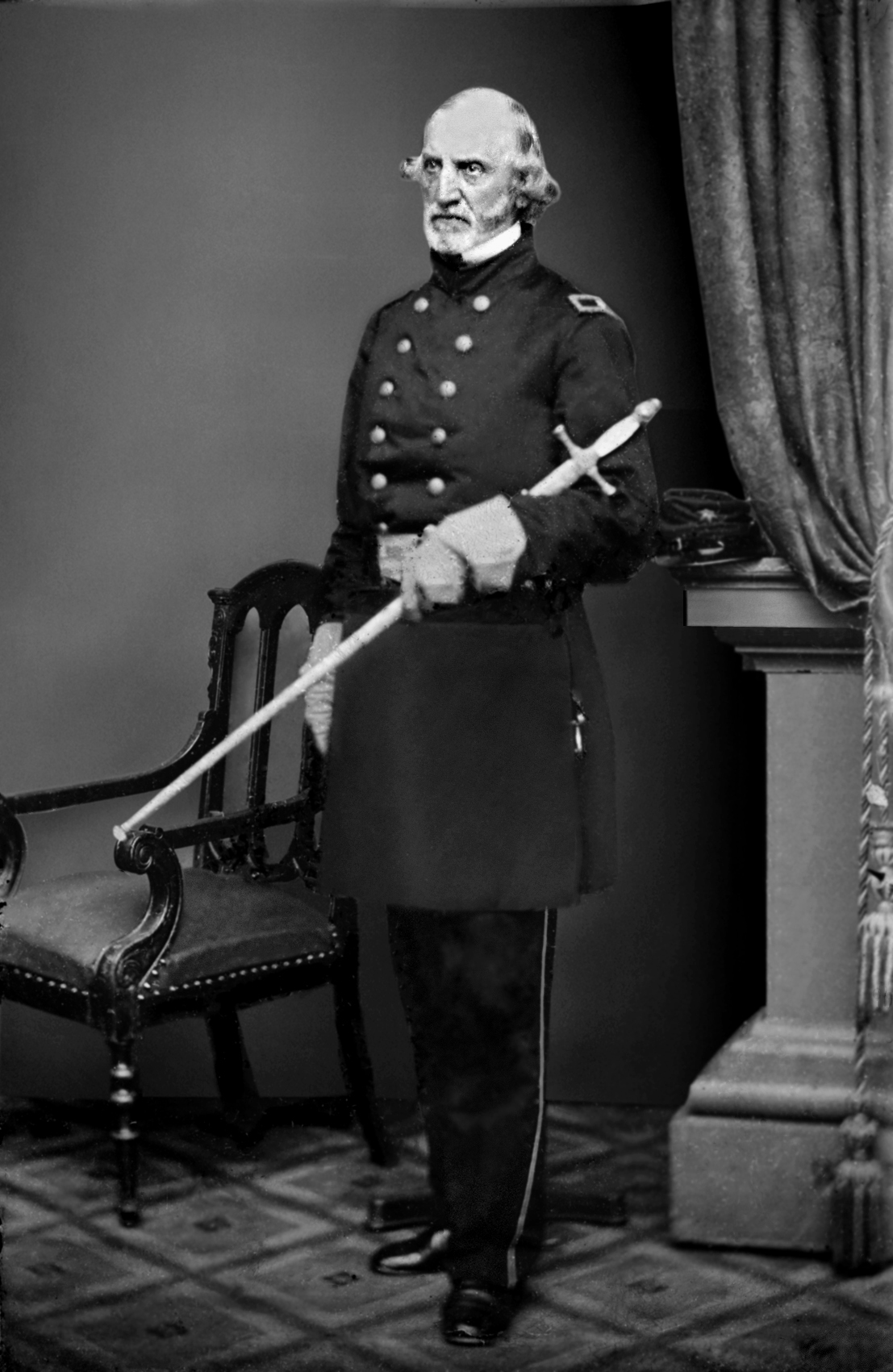
- General Daniel Tyler, c. 1862–1864
- Born: Daniel P. Tyler IV; January 7, 1799; Brooklyn, Connecticut, U.S.
- Died: November 30, 1882 (aged 83); New York City, New York, U.S.
- Burial place: Hillside Cemetery, Anniston, Alabama
- Military career
- Allegiance: Union
- Branch: United States Army; Union Army
- Service years: 1819 – 1834; 1861 – 1864
- Rank: Brigadier General
- Commands: 1st Connecticut Volunteer Infantry Regiment; Camp Douglas
- Conflicts: American Civil War; Manassas campaign; Battle of Blackburn's Ford; First Battle of Bull Run; Siege of Corinth; Gettysburg campaign
- Other work: Iron manufacturer Railroad President

Daniel P. Tyler IV (January 7, 1799 – November 30, 1882) was an American iron manufacturer, railroad president, and one of the first Union Army generals of the American Civil War.

== Early life and service ==
Daniel P. Tyler IV was born in Brooklyn, Connecticut, to Daniel P. Tyler III (May 21, 1750 – April 29, 1832), a veteran of the Battle of Bunker Hill, and Sarah Edwards Tyler (July 11, 1761 – April 25, 1841), granddaughter of Jonathan Edwards. He was uncle to Robert O. Tyler who would also serve as a general in the Civil War.

He graduated from the United States Military Academy in 1819. He became an authority on artillery and an honest inspector of arms of private contractors, which appears not to have helped him advance above first lieutenant in rank.

Tyler resigned his commission in the United States Army in May 1834 and became an iron manufacturer, developing blast furnaces and rolling mills. He was the president of the Norwich and Worcester Railroad and, for five years, the Macon and Western Railroad in Georgia. Later, Tyler served as the superintending engineer of the Dauphin and Susquehanna Railroad and the affiliated Allentown Railroad, and became president and engineer when the former was reorganized as the Schuylkill and Susquehanna Railroad. He had greater success in the railroad industry than he had in the manufacture of pig iron.

=== American Civil War service ===
At the start of the Civil War, Tyler volunteered to be an aide-de-camp to Brig. Gen. Robert Patterson in April 1861. He served briefly as the colonel of the 1st Connecticut Infantry. He was appointed brigadier general in the Connecticut Militia on May 10, 1861 and commanded a division in Brig. Gen. Irvin McDowell's Army of Northeastern Virginia, with which he fought in the First Battle of Bull Run. Tyler was mustered out on August 11, 1861. Though he has been assigned a substantial portion of the blame for the Union disaster at Bull Run, he was appointed to the rank of brigadier general of volunteers on March 13, 1862. He was sent to the west and commanded a brigade in the Army of the Mississippi between May 1, 1862 and July 22, 1862 during the siege of Corinth.

At the Battle of Harpers Ferry on September 15, 1862, a large number of Union troops surrendered to the forces of Confederate General Thomas J. "Stonewall" Jackson. The Union soldiers, who were paroled after their capture, were sent to Camp Douglas, which already had been used as a prisoner of war camp for Confederates captured at the Battle of Fort Donelson, for temporary detention. Under the terms of the prisoner exchange cartel then in effect, they had to await formal exchange before they could leave the camp. These 8,000 paroled Union soldiers began to arrive at Camp Douglas on September 28, 1862, and Tyler was ordered to take temporary command of the camp. Under Tyler's command, these Union soldiers had to live under similar conditions to those endured by the Confederate prisoners from Fort Donelson. In fact, the conditions were worse because the camp had become filthy and even more run-down during its occupancy by the prisoners. The parolees had a two-month stay at the camp. Tyler was relieved as commander on November 20, 1862. Later, Tyler commanded at Baltimore, at Harper's Ferry between June 13, 1863, and July 3, 1864, and finally at the District of Delaware between July 3, 1863, and January 19, 1864.

Tyler resigned his commission in the Union Army on April 6, 1864, then being older than the retirement age of 65, and moved to New Jersey. Then, in the 1870s, he moved to Alabama and founded the town of Anniston, named for his daughter-in-law. He established an iron manufacturing company and was president of the Mobile and Montgomery Railroad. He also acquired large tracts of land in Guadalupe County, Texas.

== Personal life ==
Daniel Tyler married Emily Lee of Norwich, Connecticut on May 18, 1832. They had five children; Alfred Lee, Gertrude, Edmund Leighton, Mary Law, and Augustus Cleveland. Gertrude was the mother of Edith Carow Roosevelt, wife of President Theodore Roosevelt. Tyler died while visiting New York City on November 30, 1882. He is buried in Hillside Cemetery, at Anniston, Alabama.

== See also ==
- List of American Civil War generals (Union)
