= 1st Connecticut Infantry Regiment =

Infantry regiment of the Union Army

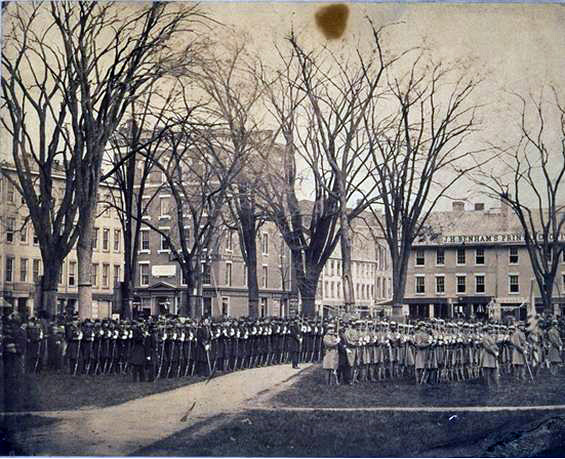
- 1st Connecticut Infantry Regiment in New Haven, 1861
- Active: 22 April – 31 July 1861
- Country: United States
- Allegiance: Union
- Branch: Infantry
- Engagements: First Battle of Bull Run

Commanders
- Notable commanders: Colonel Daniel Tyler, Lieutenant Colonel George S. Burnham, Major John L. Chatfield (22 April -10 May 1861) Colonel George S. Burnham, Lieutenant Colonel John L. Chatfield, Major Spiedel (10–31 May 1861) Colonel George S. Burnham, Lieutenant Colonel Spiedel, Major Theodore Byxbee (31 May - 31 July 1861)

The 1st Connecticut Infantry Regiment, officially designated the 1st Regiment Connecticut Volunteer Infantry, was an infantry regiment that served in the Union Army during the American Civil War. Men were recruited under the calls of President Lincoln on 15 April 1861 and Governor Buckingham the following day.

== Service ==
Many Connecticut residents had anticipated a call to arms, and as a result, several companies had already reached their manpower requirements by the 16th. The 1st Connecticut Infantry Regiment was organized in Hartford, Connecticut, and was mustered in for three months service on April 22, 1861, under the command of Colonel Daniel Tyler. John Speidel was elected Lieutenant Colonel. Their rifle companies were issued Sharps rifles from state stocks. The regiment left for Washington, D.C., on 18 May on the steamer Bienville and served at Fort Corcoran as part of the capitol garrison. It was attached to Mansfield's command in the Department of Washington until 1 June. The regiment was assigned to Key's 1st Brigade, Tyler's Division, McDowell's Army of Northeastern Virginia on 1 June and advanced to Vienna and Falls Church in northern Virginia between 1 and 8 June. It served on picket duty there until 16 July, then participated in the advance on Manassas, occupying Fairfax Court House on 17 July. The regiment fought in the First Battle of Bull Run on 21 July, and was lauded for maintaining discipline during the retreat of the Union troops. It spent the next few days packing up the abandoned camps of other regiments. The 1st began to march to New Haven on 27 July, and was mustered out of service on 31 July.

During the unit's service, 6 men were wounded, 6 were captured, and 25 were discharged for disability.

== See also ==
- Connecticut in the American Civil War
- List of Connecticut Civil War units
