= List of Connecticut units in the American Civil War =

List on the Wikimedia project

United States flag between 1863 and 1865.

== Infantry ==
- 1st Regiment Connecticut Volunteer Infantry (3 months)
- 2nd Regiment Connecticut Volunteer Infantry (3 months)
- 3rd Regiment Connecticut Volunteer Infantry (3 months)
- 4th Regiment Connecticut Volunteer Infantry
- 5th Regiment Connecticut Volunteer Infantry
- 6th Regiment Connecticut Volunteer Infantry
- 7th Regiment Connecticut Volunteer Infantry
- 8th Regiment Connecticut Volunteer Infantry
- 9th Regiment Connecticut Volunteer Infantry
- 10th Regiment Connecticut Volunteer Infantry
- 11th Regiment Connecticut Volunteer Infantry
- 12th Regiment Connecticut Volunteer Infantry
- 13th Regiment Connecticut Volunteer Infantry
- 14th Regiment Connecticut Volunteer Infantry
- 15th Regiment Connecticut Volunteer Infantry
- 16th Regiment Connecticut Volunteer Infantry
- 17th Regiment Connecticut Volunteer Infantry
- 18th Regiment Connecticut Volunteer Infantry
- 19th Regiment Connecticut Volunteer Infantry
- 20th Regiment Connecticut Volunteer Infantry
- 21st Regiment Connecticut Volunteer Infantry
- 22nd Regiment Connecticut Volunteer Infantry
- 23rd Regiment Connecticut Volunteer Infantry
- 24th Regiment Connecticut Volunteer Infantry
- 25th Regiment Connecticut Volunteer Infantry
- 26th Regiment Connecticut Volunteer Infantry
- 27th Regiment Connecticut Volunteer Infantry
- 28th Regiment Connecticut Volunteer Infantry
- 29th Regiment Connecticut Volunteer Infantry (African Descent)
- 30th Regiment Connecticut Volunteer Infantry (African Descent) - four companies organized in March 1864; consolidated with the 31st United States Colored Infantry on May 18, 1864

== Cavalry ==
- 1st Regiment Connecticut Volunteer Cavalry
- 1st Squadron, Connecticut Cavalry

== Artillery ==
- 1st Connecticut Heavy Artillery Regiment
- 2nd Connecticut Heavy Artillery Regiment
- 1st Connecticut Light Artillery Battery
- 2nd Connecticut Light Artillery Battery
- 3rd Connecticut Light Artillery Battery

== See also ==
- Lists of American Civil War Regiments by State
