= Fort Richardson (Arlington, Virginia) =

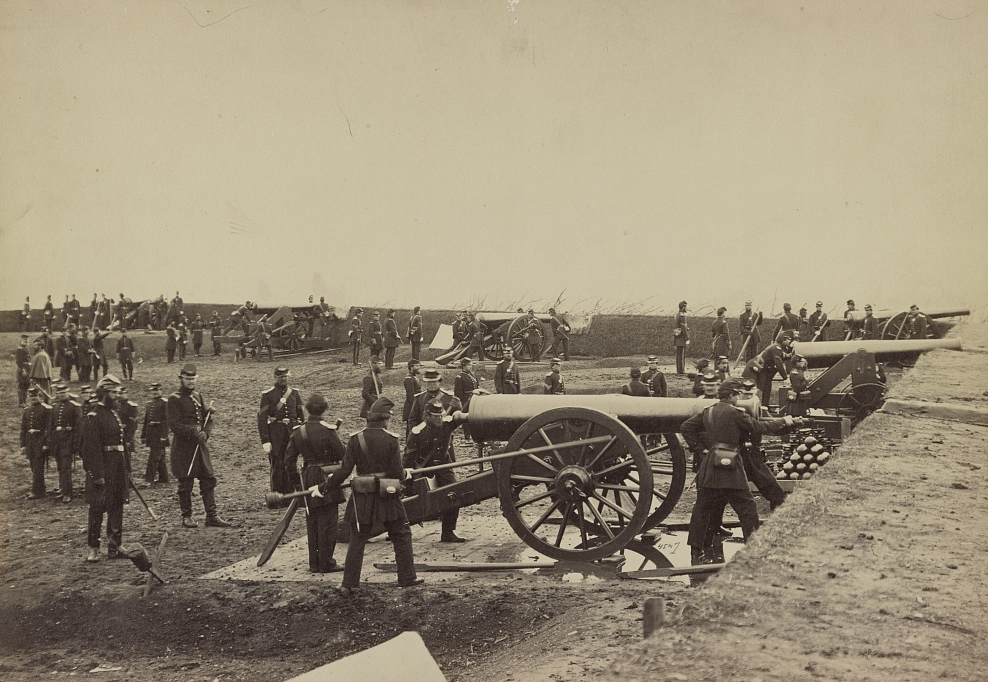
- 1st Connecticut Heavy Artillery at Fort Richardson (1861)

- Location within District of Columbia

General information
- Status: Remnant open to public
- Type: Civil war fort
- Location: Arlington County, Virginia, Army Navy Country Club, 1700 Army Navy Drive, Arlington, Virginia 22203
- Coordinates: 38°51′28″N 77°04′41″W
- Elevation: 220 ft (67 m)
- Construction started: 1861
- Owner: Army Navy Country Club

Design and construction
- Architect: Major Daniel Phineas Woodbury
- Developer: Union Army

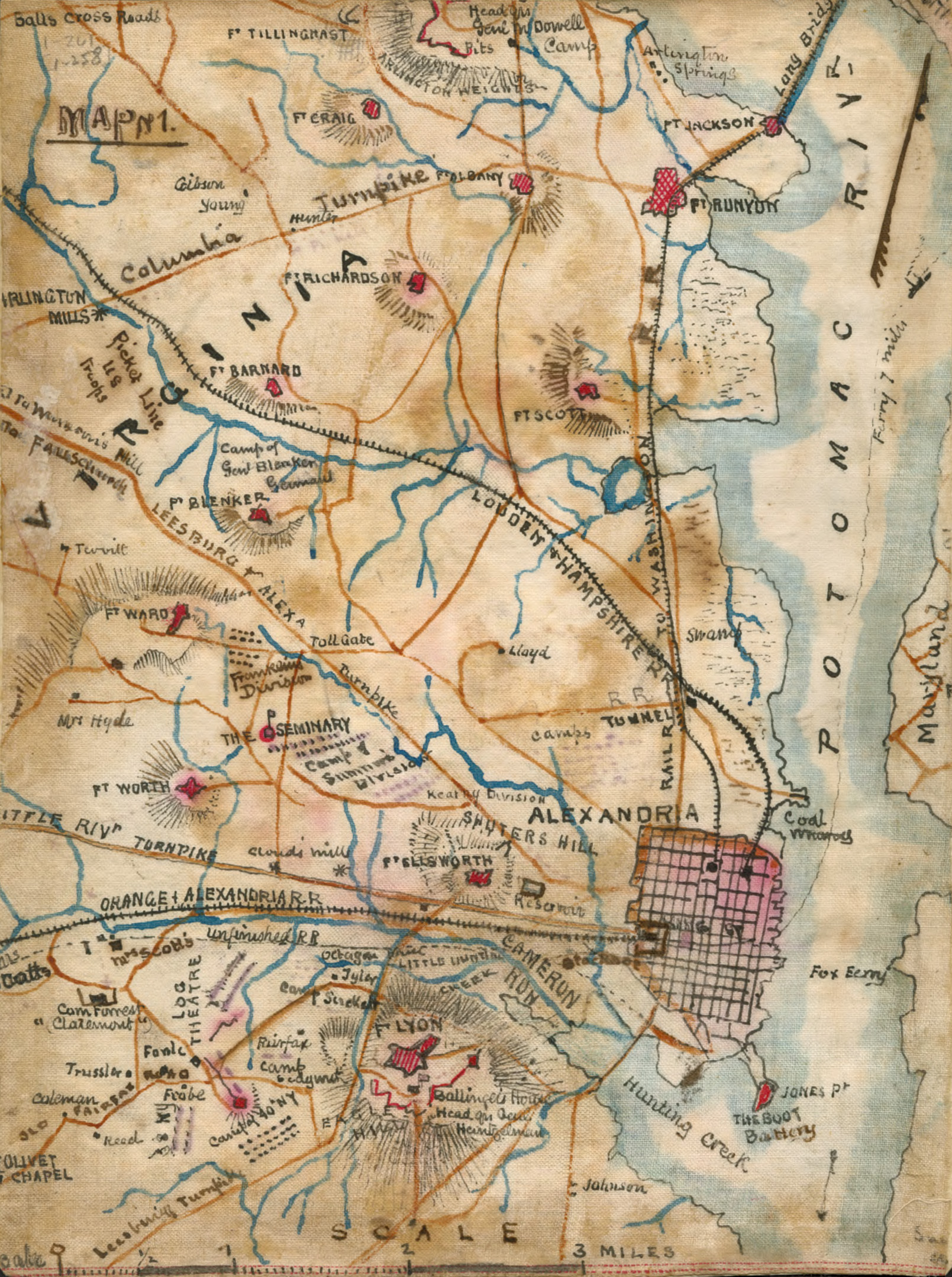
Map of Civil War forts near Alexandria, showing Fort Richardson (ca. September 1861)

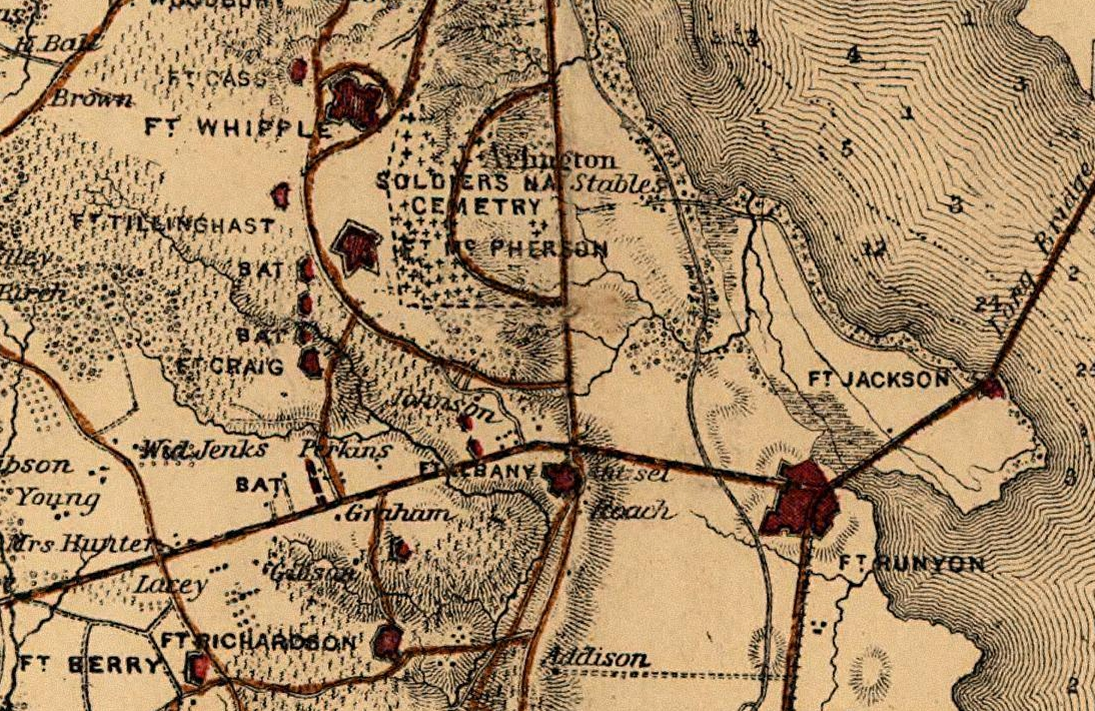
Map of Fort Craig and surrounding area including Fort Richardson (1865)

Fort Richardson was a detached redoubt that the Union Army constructed in September 1861 as part of the Civil War defenses of Washington (see Washington, D.C., in the American Civil War). The Army built the fort shortly after its rout at the First Battle of Bull Run (Manassas) in late July 1861. The Army named the fort after General Israel B. Richardson, whose division had been deployed to defend the City of Washington against attack by way of the Columbia Turnpike.

The structure, which was the highest fortification on the Arlington Line, occupied a commanding position on the crest of a ridge. It had a perimeter of 316 yards and emplacements for 15 guns, including a 100-pound Parrott rifle that could sweep a sector from Fort Ellsworth to Fort DeKalb (later named Fort Strong). The fort housed bomb-proofs and two ammunition magazines, and was adjacent to a military encampment.

A May 17, 1864, report from the Union Army's Inspector of Artillery (see Union Army artillery organization) noted the following:

Fort Richardson, Major Trumbull commanding.–Garrison, three companies First Connecticut Heavy Artillery–1 major, 12 commissioned officers, 1 ordnance-sergeant, 412 men. Armament, two 24-pounder field howitzers, six 24-pounder siege (smooth), one 100-pounder rifled Parrott, three 30-pounder rifled Parrotts, two 24-pounder Coehorn mortars, one 10-inch mortar. Magazines, two: dry and in good order. Ammunition, full supply and serviceable. Implements, complete and in good order. Drill in artillery, fair. Drill in infantry, fair. Discipline, fair. Garrison sufficient for the work.

After the Civil War ended in 1865, the United States Army returned many of the properties that contained its fortifications in the Washington, D.C., area to the properties' rightful owners. In some instances, the Army compensated the owners for the use of the properties and for damages that had resulted from the Army's wartime activities. In addition, the Army sold at auction many of the fortifications' materials.

The remnants of Fort Richardson are presently located on the grounds of the Army Navy Country Club in Arlington County, Virginia. The fortification's earthen south wall and ditches are well-preserved. A historic marker that the Arlington County government erected in 1965 stands along the Country Club's private access road (Memorial Drive) alongside the remnants of the fort.
