= 2nd Connecticut Heavy Artillery Regiment =

- Active: November 23, 1863, to August 18, 1865
- Country: United States
- Allegiance: Union
- Branch: Heavy Artillery
- Engagements: Battle of Cold Harbor; Battle of Opequon; Battle of Fisher's Hill; Battle of Cedar Creek; Battle of Petersburg III; Battle of Sailor's Creek; Battle of Hatcher's Run

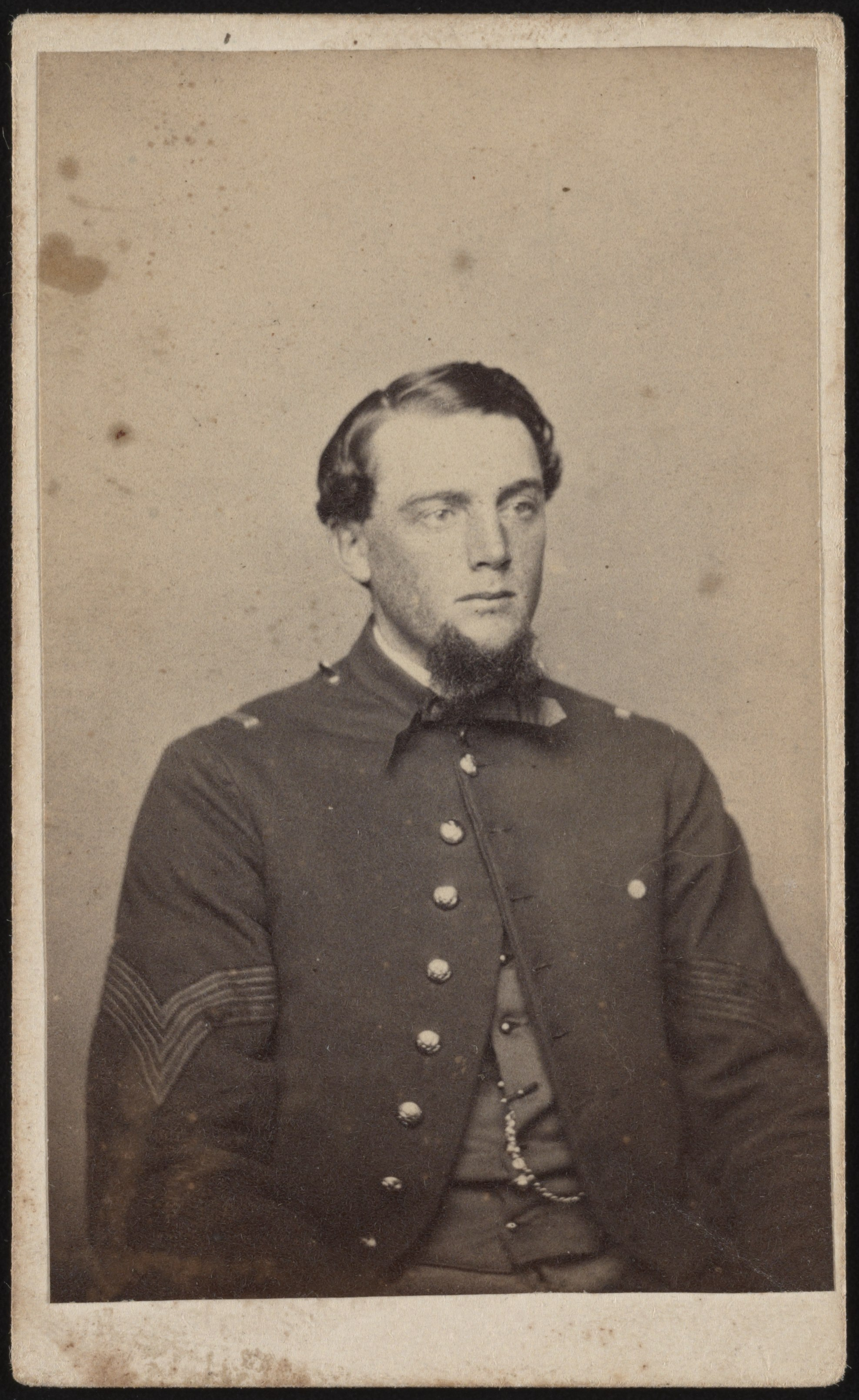
First Sergeant Henry S. Dean of Co. G, 2nd Connecticut Heavy Artillery Regiment. From the Liljenquist Family Collection of Civil War Photographs, Prints and Photographs Division, Library of Congress

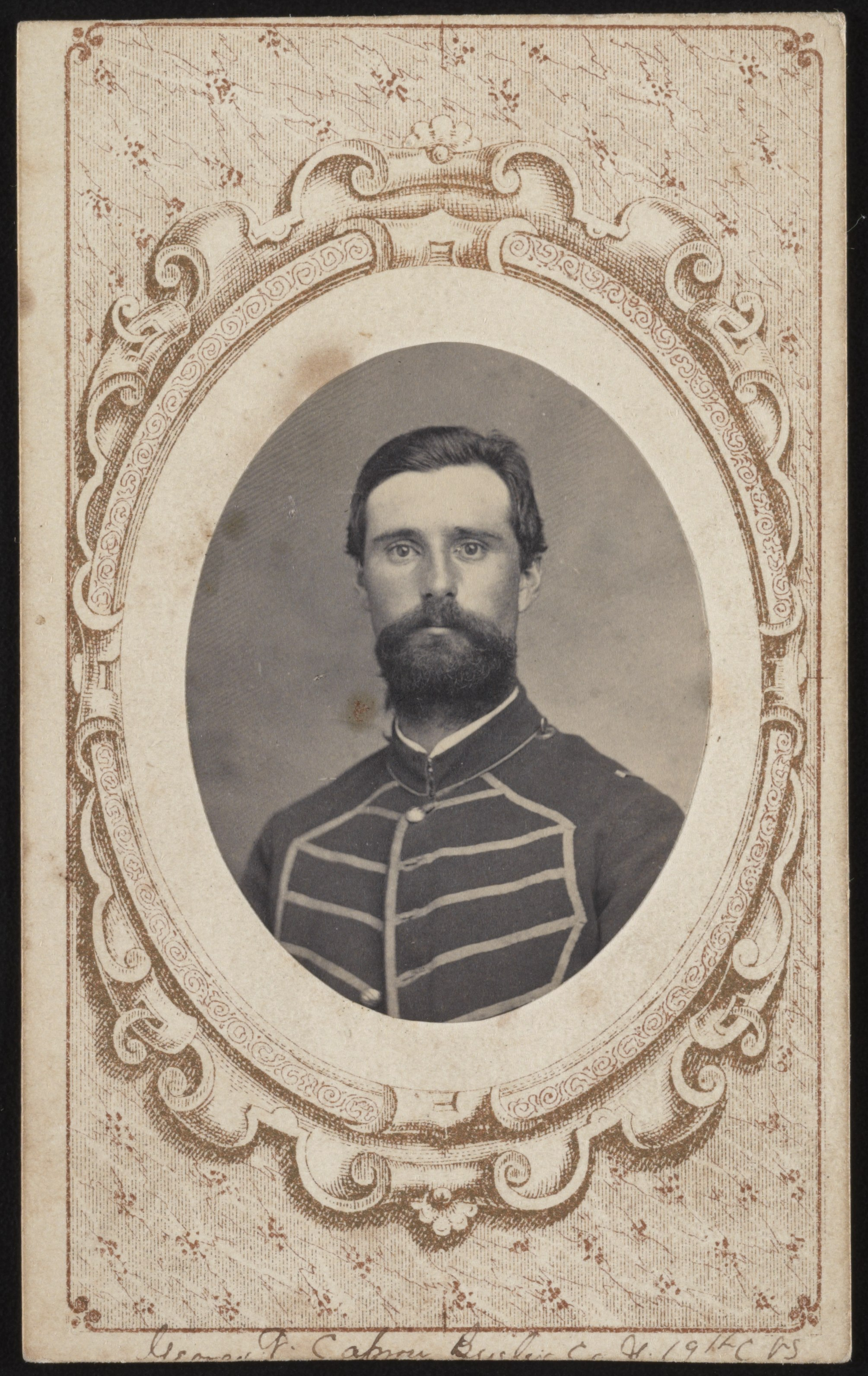
Private George V. Capron, bugler, of Co. G, 2nd Connecticut Heavy Artillery Regiment

The 2nd Connecticut Heavy Artillery Regiment (originally raised as the 19th Connecticut Infantry) was a volunteer infantry regiment which served in the Union Army during the American Civil War.

== History ==
The 19th Connecticut Infantry was mustered in on July 25, 1862. L.W. Wessells was colonel and Elisha S. Kellogg lieutenant colonel. It was sent to Washington, D.C. a few weeks later. In September, Wessells resigned due to ill health and Kellogg was promoted to colonel in his place. The regiment was reorganized as a heavy artillery regiment on November 23, 1863, although it fought as infantry throughout the war.

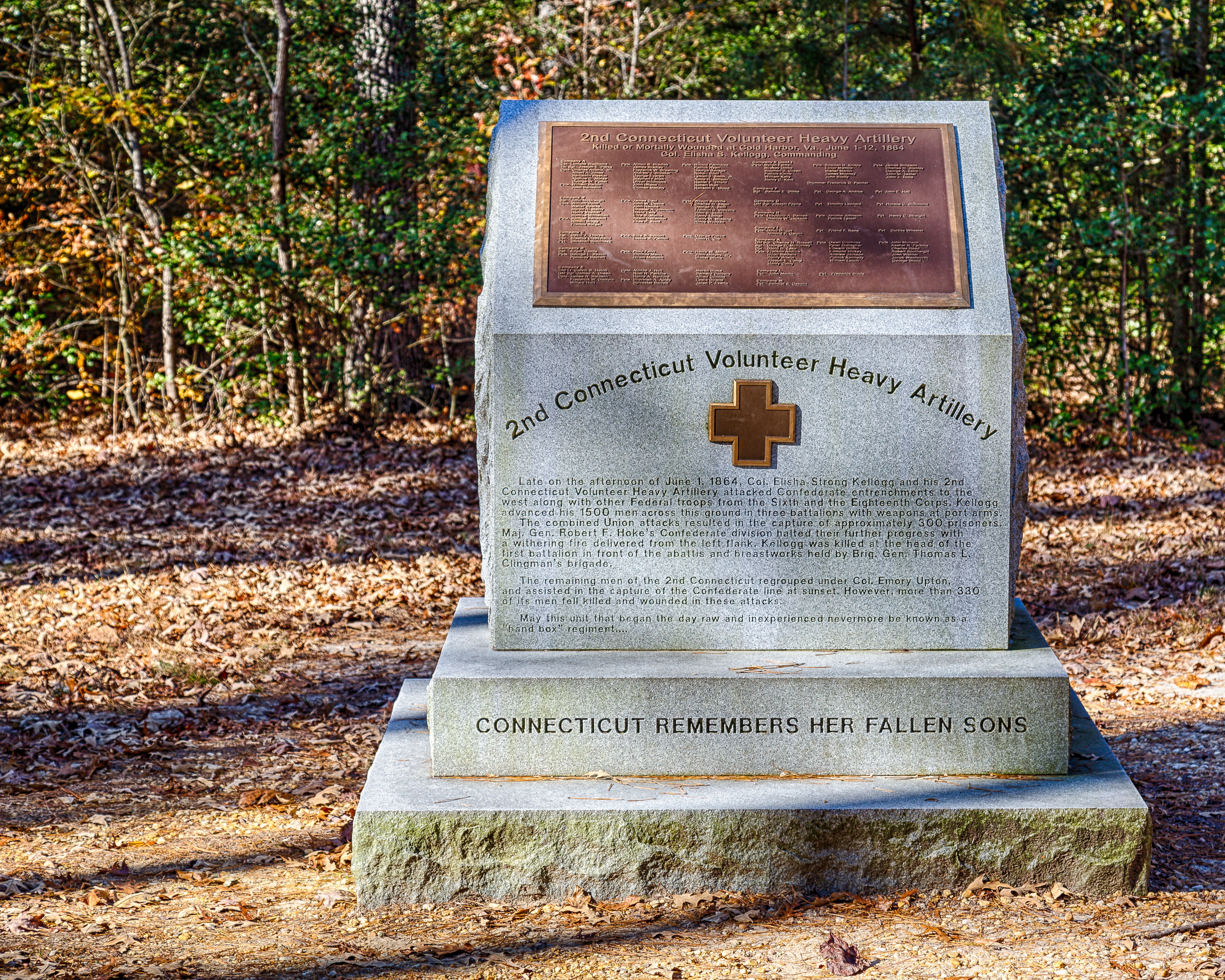
Monument at Cold Harbor battlefield

In May 1864, the 2nd was sent to the Army of the Potomac, where it was assigned to the Second Brigade, First Division, VI Corps. It suffered its first loss during skirmish duty along the North Anna River. The 2nd Connecticut's first battle was at Cold Harbor on June 1, 1864, where it suffered 323 men killed or wounded, including Kellogg dead with two bullets to the head. It managed to capture 300 prisoners and it briefly reached the Confederate breastworks, but Confederate fire was too heavy for the regiment to maintain its position. Major James Hubbard declined promotion to command of the regiment, so Ranald S. Mackenzie was transferred from the engineers to take command. The regiment participated in the beginning stages of the Siege of Petersburg.

It was transferred to the VI Corps to participate in the 1864 Shenandoah Campaign, during which it suffered heavy losses. In December, the regiment was sent back to the Army of the Potomac. Mackenzie was promoted to brigadier general on December 28, and Hubbard was promoted to colonel a week later. It fought in the breakthrough at Petersburg and the Appomattox Campaign. After the surrender at Appomattox Court House, the 2nd was sent to North Carolina to assist Maj. Gen. William T. Sherman in forcing the surrender of the Army of Tennessee. In May, the remaining members of the 14th Connecticut Infantry Regiment were assigned to the regiment. After participating in the Grand Review, the regiment garrisoned several forts around Washington. The 2nd Connecticut Heavy Artillery was mustered out on September 5, 1865, with only 183 original men who served with the 19th Connecticut remaining.

== Casualties ==
Killed/died of wounds
12 Officers
242 Enlisted men

Died by disease/accident
2 Officers
171 Enlisted men by disease

== Battle of Cold Harbor ==
The 2nd Connecticut Heavy Artillery losses suffered at Cold Harbor on the June 1 assault, and held their position for 36 hours.

Regimental commander-Colonel Elisha S. Kellogg (killed)

First Battalion-Major James Hubbard

Company A C:..........................Company B.......................Company K.......................Company E
Capt. Wadham (wounded).......Capt. Lewis........................Capt. Spencer....................Capt. Skinner
17 killed................................18 killed............................10 killed.............................17 killed
10 died of wounds...................7 died of wounds.................8 dead of wounds...............4 died of wounds
28 wounded...........................26 wounded.......................19 wounded.......................25 wounded

Second Battalion-Major James Rice

Company L.......................Company C........................Company H........................Company G
Capt. Deane (wounded)........Capt. Fenn..........................Capt. Berry.........................Capt. Gold
1 killed...............................4 killed..............................3 killed...............................1 killed
2 died of wounds..................3 died of wounds.................1 dead of wounds................1 died of wounds
8 wounded..........................11 wounded.........................15 wounded.......................14 wounded

Third Battalion- Major William B. Ells (wounded)

Company M.......................Company D....................... Company I........................Company F
Capt. Marsh........................Capt. Hosford.......................Capt. Burnham...................Capt. Jones
1 killed..............................4 killed.................................2 killed...............................2 killed
- died of wounds..................5 died of wounds...................1 died of wounds.................1 died of wounds
6 wounded.........................16 wounded...........................11 wounded........................9 wounded

Total loss at Cold Harbor
81 killed
43 died of wounds
189 "recovered" wounded

== See also ==
- List of Connecticut Civil War units
