= John Law (Indiana politician) =

American politician (1796–1853)

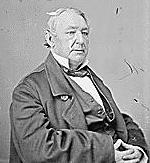

Member of the U.S. House of Representatives from Indiana's 1st district
- In office March 4, 1861 – March 3, 1865
- Preceded by: William E. Niblack
- Succeeded by: William E. Niblack

Member of the Indiana House of Representatives from the ? district
- In office 1824–1825

Personal details
- Born: October 28, 1796 New London, Connecticut, U.S.
- Died: October 7, 1873 (aged 76) Evansville, Indiana, U.S
- Resting place: Greenlawn Cemetery; Vincennes, Indiana, U.S.
- Party: Democratic
- Relations: William Henry Law (brother); Amasa Learned (grandfather); Richard Law (grandfather); Jonathan Law (great-grandfather)
- Parent: Lyman Law (father)
- Education: Yale College

John Law (October 28, 1796 – October 7, 1873) was an American politician who represented Indiana in the United States House of Representatives from 1861 to 1865. He was the son of Lyman Law, and grandson of Richard Law, and Amasa Learned.

== Biography ==
John Law was born on October 28, 1796, in New London, Connecticut. His father was Lyman Law and his brother was William Henry Law. His grandfathers were Amasa Learned and Richard Law. His great-grandfather was Jonathan Law. He pursued classical studies and graduated from Yale College in 1814. Later, he studied law and he was admitted to the bar in 1817 and he commenced practice in Vincennes, Indiana.

=== Early career ===
Law was the prosecuting attorney from 1818 to 1820 and a member of the Indiana House of Representatives in 1824 and 1825. He was again the prosecuting attorney from 1825 to 1828 and judge of the seventh judicial circuit from 1830 to 1831. He served as the receiver of the land office at Vincennes from 1838 to 1842 and was again a judge from 1844 to 1850, when he resigned.

Law moved to Evansville, Indiana in 1851. He invested in large tracts of land and was an author. He was appointed by President Franklin Pierce judge of the court of land claims and served from 1855 to 1857.

=== Congress ===
Law was elected as a Democrat to the Thirty-seventh and Thirty-eighth Congresses (March 4, 1861 – March 3, 1865) but was not a candidate for renomination in 1864.

=== Later career and death ===
After leaving Congress, he resumed the practice of law. He died in Evansville, Indiana 1873 and was buried in Greenlawn Cemetery, Vincennes, Indiana.

== Electoral history ==
General election 1860
Party	Candidate	Votes	%
Democratic	John Law	13,476	55.7
Republican	Lemuel Debruler	10,731	44.3

General election 1862
Party	Candidate	Votes	%
Democratic	John Law	11,963	53.1
National Union	Johnson	10,583	46.9

U.S. House of Representatives
Preceded by William E. Niblack	Member of the U.S. House of Representatives from Indiana's 1st congressional district 1861–1865	Succeeded by William E. Niblack
