= Cedar Grove Cemetery (New London, Connecticut) =

Cemetery in New London County, Connecticut

Coordinates: 41°21′57″N 72°07′28″W

The Cedar Grove Cemetery is a non-sectarian rural cemetery in New London, Connecticut. It was established in 1851 on 39 acres and designed by Dr. Horatio Stone. It is located at the intersection of Broad Street and Jefferson Avenue. It was listed on the National Register of Historic Places in 2024.

== Points of interest ==
As New London developed in the late 19th century, remains from earlier cemeteries in the city were relocated to the Cedar Grove Cemetery.

The cemetery features the Comrades Monument which was erected around 1900 by the Grand Army of the Republic to honor Civil War veterans buried there. It is about 23 feet tall and features a life-sized figure of a Civil War soldier on top of a pedestal.

The cemetery has been a place of burial for leading citizens of New London. It is the resting place for a governor of Connecticut, two United States senators, ten members of Congress, a member of the Continental Congress, and a recipient of the Medal of Honor.

== Notable interments ==
- Nathan Belcher, US Representative
- Augustus Brandegee, US Representative
- Frank Bosworth Brandegee, US Senator
- Henry Burbeck, Brigadier General in the War of 1812
- Joshua Coit, US Representative
- Thomas H. Cushing, Brigadier General in the War of 1812
- Harry Daghlian, Manhattan Project physicist killed by the Demon core
- Nicoll Fosdick, US Representative
- Richard P. Freeman, US Representative
- Lyman Law, US Representative
- Richard Law, member of the Continental Congress
- Amasa Learned, preacher, lawyer, and politician
- Gustavus W. Smith, Major General in the Confederate States Army
- Benjamin Stark, US Senator
- Griffin Alexander Stedman, Union Army Colonel in the American Civil War
- Thomas M. Waller, Governor
- George C. Williams, Civil War recipient of the Medal of Honor
- Thomas Wheeler Williams, US Representative
