= 5th Connecticut Infantry Regiment =

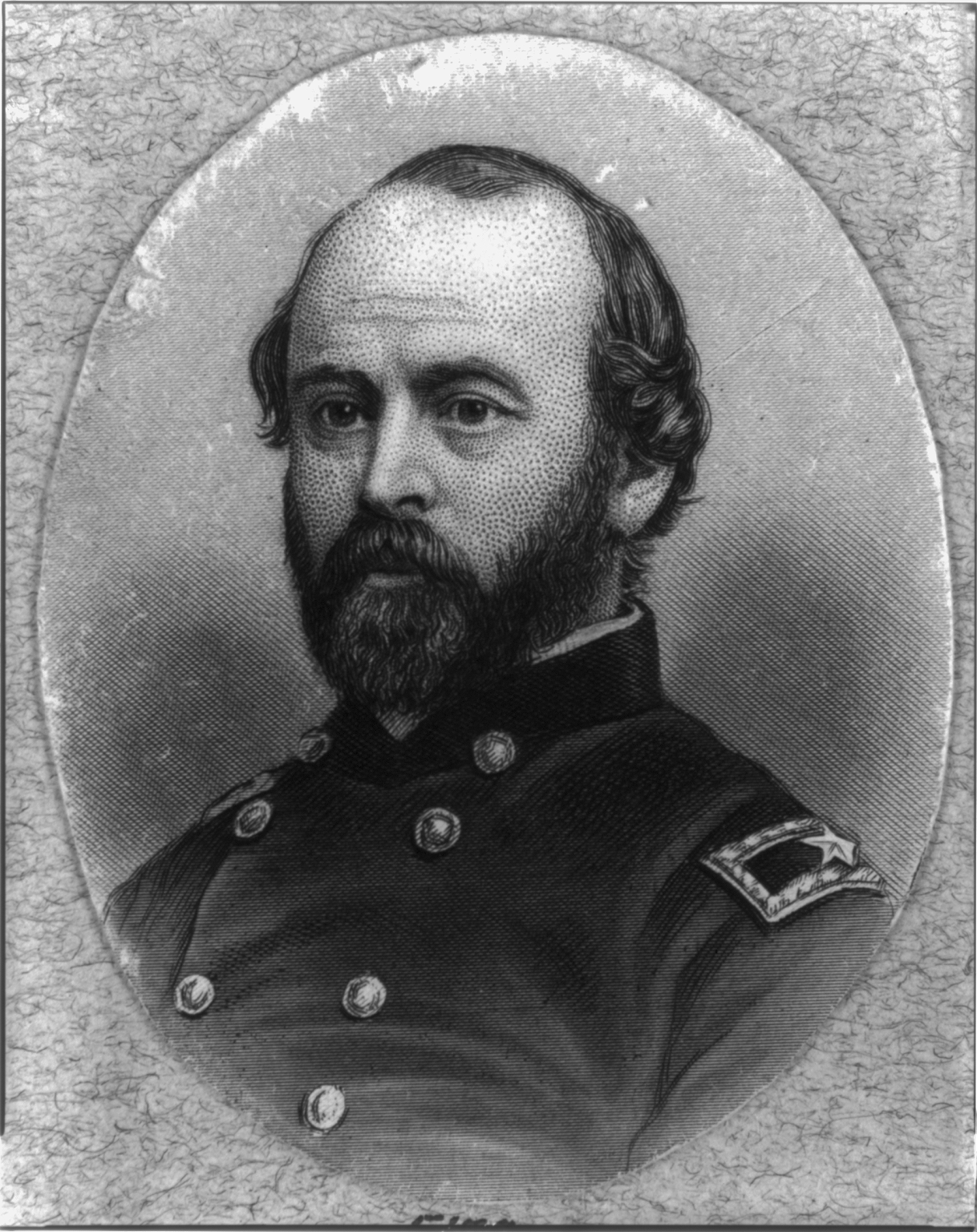
- Colonel Orris S. Ferry the original commander of the 5th Connecticut from 1861-1863.
- Active: July 26, 1861 - July 19, 1865
- Country: United States
- Allegiance: Union
- Branch: United States Army
- Type: Infantry
- Nickname: Colt's Rifle Regiment
- Engagements: Battle of Front Royal; First Battle of Winchester; Battle of Cedar Mountain; Second Battle of Bull Run; Chancellorsville Campaign; Battle of Chancellorsville; Battle of Gettysburg; Atlanta campaign Battle of Resaca; Battle of Dallas; Battle of New Hope Church; Battle of Allatoona; Battle of Kennesaw Mountain; Battle of Peachtree Creek; Sherman's March to the Sea; Carolinas campaign Battle of Bentonville

Commanders
- Colonel: Orris Sanford Ferry
- Colonel: Warren Packer
- Lt. Col.: Henry W. Daboll

The 5th Connecticut Infantry Regiment was an infantry regiment that served in the Union Army during the American Civil War.

== Service ==
The 5th Connecticut Infantry Regiment was organized at Hartford, Connecticut and mustered in for a three-year enlistment on July 26, 1861, under the command of Colonel Orris Sanford Ferry. The regiment was informally known as "Colt's Rifle Regiment" after the local Hartford, Connecticut inventor and weapon designer Samuel Colt.

The regiment was attached to George H. Thomas' Brigade, Banks' Division, to October 1861. Gordon's Brigade, Banks' Division, Army of the Potomac, to March 1862. 1st Brigade, 1st Division, Banks' V Corps, and Department of the Shenandoah to June 1862. 1st Brigade, 1st Division, II Corps, Army of Virginia, to September 1862. 1st Brigade, 1st Division, XII Corps, Army of the Potomac and Army of the Cumberland to April 1864. 2nd Brigade, 3rd Division, XX Corps, Army of the Cumberland, April 1864. 1st Brigade, 1st Division, XX Corps to June 1865. 2nd Brigade, Bartlett's Division, XXII Corps, Department of Washington to July 1865.

The 5th Connecticut Infantry mustered out of service July 19, 1865.

== Detailed service ==
The 5th Connecticut left Connecticut for Baltimore, Maryland, on July 29, 1861. They then moved to Harpers Ferry, West Virginia on July 30, and did duty there until August 16. Next they did guard and outpost duty on the Upper Potomac until February 1862. At the same time they were involved in operations near Edward's Ferry October 20–24, 1861. Operations about Dams Nos. 4 and 5 from December 17–20, 1861.

They advanced on Winchester, Virginia March 1–12, 1862. Near Winchester March 5. Occupation of Winchester March 12. Ordered to Manassas, Virginia, March 18, returning to Winchester March 19. Pursuit of Stonewall Jackson March 24-April 27. Columbia Furnace April 17. At Strasburg till May 20. Retreat to Winchester May 20–25. Action at Front Royal May 23. Middletown May 24. Battle of Winchester May 24–25. Retreat to Martinsburg and Williamsport May 25-June 6. At Williamsport until June 10. Moved to Front Royal June 10–18. Reconnaissance to Luray June 29–30. Moved to Warrenton, Gordonsville, and Culpeper, July. Reconnaissance to Raccoon Ford July 28 (Company I). Pope's Campaign in Northern Virginia August 6-September 2. Battle of Cedar Mountain August 9. Battle of Bull Run August 29–30. Moved to Washington, D.C., then to Frederick, Maryland September 2–12. Duty at Frederick until December 10. March to Fairfax Station December 10–14, and duty there until January 19, 1863.

Moved to Stafford Court House January 19–23, and duty there until April 27. Chancellorsville Campaign April 27-May 6. Battle of Chancellorsville May 1–5. They were in the Gettysburg campaign from June 11-July 24, 1863. Battle of Gettysburg July 1–3. Funkstown, Maryland, July 12. Snicker's Gap, Va., July 21. Near Raccoon Ford, Va. until September 24, 1863

At this point they shifted from the Virginia/West Virginia/Maryland/Pennsylvania region to Alabama, Tennessee and Georgia. March to Brandy Station, then to Bealeton and movement to Stevenson, Alabama, September 24-October 3. Guard duty along Nashville and Chattanooga Railroad at Cowan and Cumberland Tunnel until April 1864. Atlanta campaign May to September. Demonstration on Rocky Faced Ridge May 8–11. Battle of Resaca May 14–15. Cassville May 19. New Hope Church May 25. Operations on line of Pumpkin Vine Creek and battles about Dallas, New Hope Church, and Allatoona Hills May 26-June 5. Operations about Marietta, Georgia and against Kennesaw Mountain June 10-July 2. Pine Mountain June 11–14. Lost Mountain June 15–17. Gilgal or Golgotha Church June 15. Muddy Creek June 17. Noyes Creek June 19. Kolb's Farm June 22. Assault on Kennesaw June 27. Ruff's Station, Smyrna Camp Ground July 4. Chattahoochee River July 5–17. Peachtree Creek July 19–20. Siege of Atlanta July 22-August 25. Allatoona August 16. Operations at Chattahoochee River Bridge August 26-September 2. Occupation of Atlanta September 2-November 15. March to the Sea November 15-December 10. Montieth Swamp December 9. Siege of Savannah December 10–21. Carolinas Campaign January–April 1865. Thompson's Creek, near Chesterfield, South Carolina, March 2. Near Cheraw March 3. Averysboro, N.C., March 16. Battle of Bentonville March 19–21. Occupation of Goldsboro March 24. Advance on Raleigh April 9–13. Occupation of Raleigh April 14. Bennett's House April 26. Surrender of Johnston and his army. March to Washington, D.C., via Richmond, Virginia, April 29-May 20. Grand Review of the Armies May 24.

== Casualties ==
The regiment lost a total of 193 men during service; 6 officers and 104 enlisted men killed or mortally wounded, 1 officer and 82 enlisted men died of disease.

== Commanders ==
- Colonel Orris S. Ferry
- Colonel Warren W. Packer
- Lieutenant Colonel Henry W. Daboll

== Notable people ==
- George W. Corliss: Corliss served as the Captain of Company C. Corliss was awarded the Medal of Honor for his actions at the Battle of Cedar Mountain by picking up the regimental flag and carrying it forward in the face of a severe fire while being wounded.
- Griffin Alexander Stedman: Initially served as the Captain of Company I, Stedman was later promoted to the rank of Colonel to command the 11th Connecticut Infantry Regiment.
- Albert C. Burdick: Originally from Hopkinton, Burdick served as a Corporal and later Sergeant in Company G. Burdick re-enlisted in Company G on December 21, 1863 and was given a battlefield commission to First lieutenant and was transferred to Company F under Captain William P. Smith and later Captain Harlan Page Rugg. Burdick served the remainder of the war as the Regimental Adjutant. Following the war Burdick moved to Albion, Wisconsin and worked the rest of his days as a carpenter for the city and surrounding area.

== See also ==
- Connecticut in the American Civil War
- List of Connecticut Civil War units
