= George Corliss =

George Corliss may refer to:

- George Henry Corliss (1817–1888), American mechanical engineer and inventor
- George W. Corliss (1834–1903), American soldier in the American Civil War
