= Thomas L. Reilly =

American politician (1858–1924)

Thomas Reilly
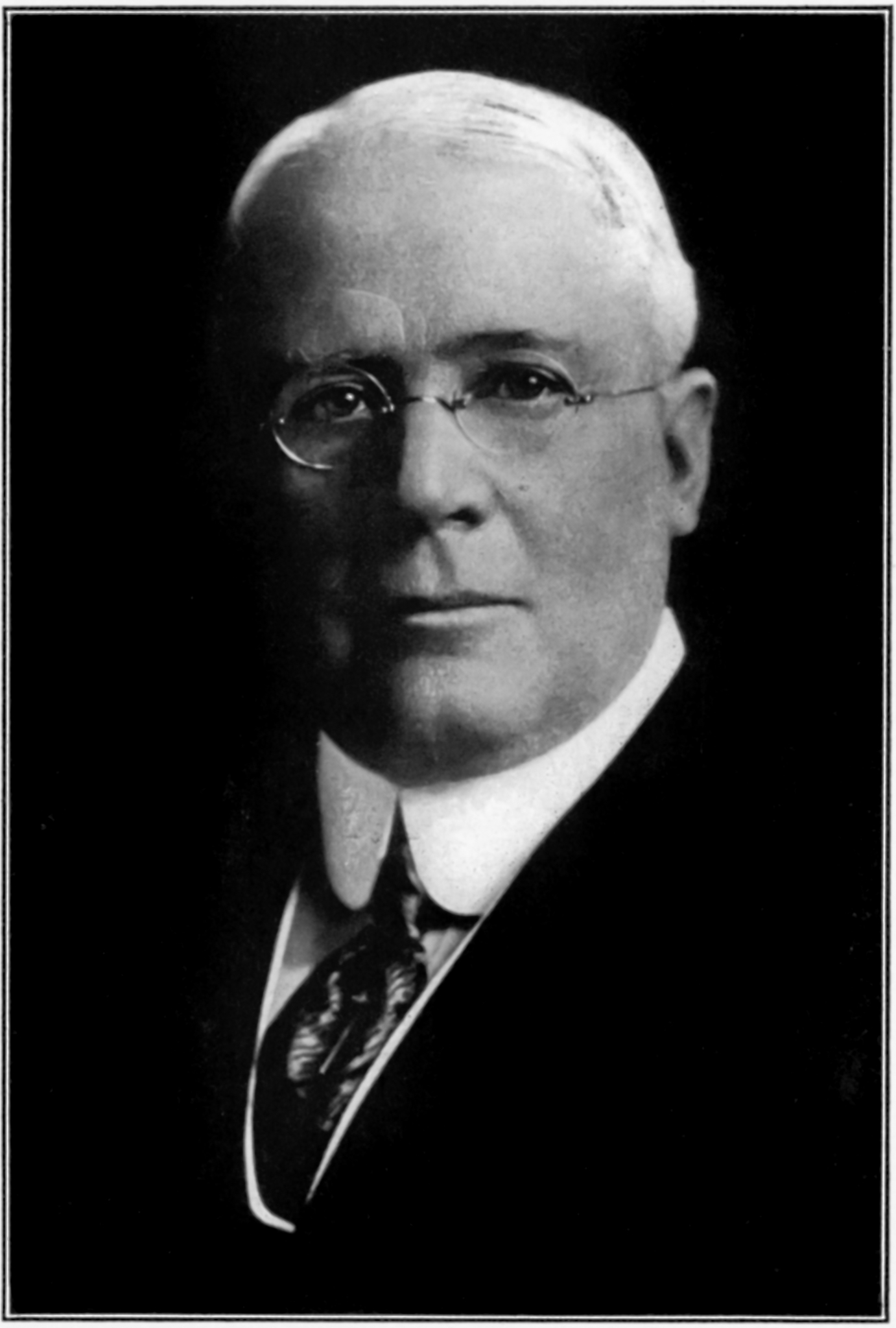

Member of the U.S. House of Representatives from Connecticut
- In office March 4, 1911 – March 3, 1915
- Preceded by: Nehemiah D. Sperry (2nd); Edwin W. Higgins (3rd)
- Succeeded by: Bryan F. Mahan (2nd); John Q. Tilson (3rd)
- Constituency: 2nd district (1911-13); 3rd district (1913-15)

Personal details
- Born: September 20, 1858 New Britain, Connecticut, U.S.
- Died: July 6, 1924 (aged 65) New Haven, Connecticut, U.S
- Party: Democrat

Thomas Lawrence Reilly (September 20, 1858 – July 6, 1924) was a U.S. Representative from Connecticut.

== Biography ==
Born in New Britain, Connecticut, Reilly attended the common schools and was graduated from the Connecticut State Normal School in 1876. He served as assistant town clerk of New Britain in 1876. He moved with his parents to Meriden, Connecticut, in 1877. He studied law for a year. He was employed as a bookkeeper for several years. He engaged as a newspaper correspondent until 1886. He was one of the founders of the Meriden Journal in 1886 and became the city editor. He served as member of the Meriden Board of Education 1896–1903. He served as chairman of the town committee in 1900. He served as mayor of Meriden 1906–1912.

Reilly was elected as a Democrat to the Sixty-second and Sixty-third Congresses (March 4, 1911 – March 3, 1915). He was an unsuccessful candidate for reelection in 1914 to the Sixty-fourth Congress. He was employed in the Internal Revenue Service in 1916 and 1917.

While representing Connecticut in the Sixty-second Congress Reilly authored section 5 of the appropriations bill that limited postal workers 8-hour shifts to be spread out over no more than 10 hour spans. This was known as the Reilly Eight in Ten Law.

Reilly was elected sheriff of New Haven County in 1918. He was reelected and served until his death in New Haven, Connecticut, July 6, 1924. He was interred in Sacred Heart Cemetery, Meriden, Connecticut.

U.S. House of Representatives
Preceded by Nehemiah D. Sperry	Member of the U.S. House of Representatives from Connecticut's 2nd congressional district 1911–1913	Succeeded by Bryan F. Mahan
Preceded by Edwin W. Higgins	Member of the U.S. House of Representatives from Connecticut's 3rd congressional district 1913–1915	Succeeded by John Q. Tilson
