= 1914 United States Senate election in Connecticut =

- November 3, 1914
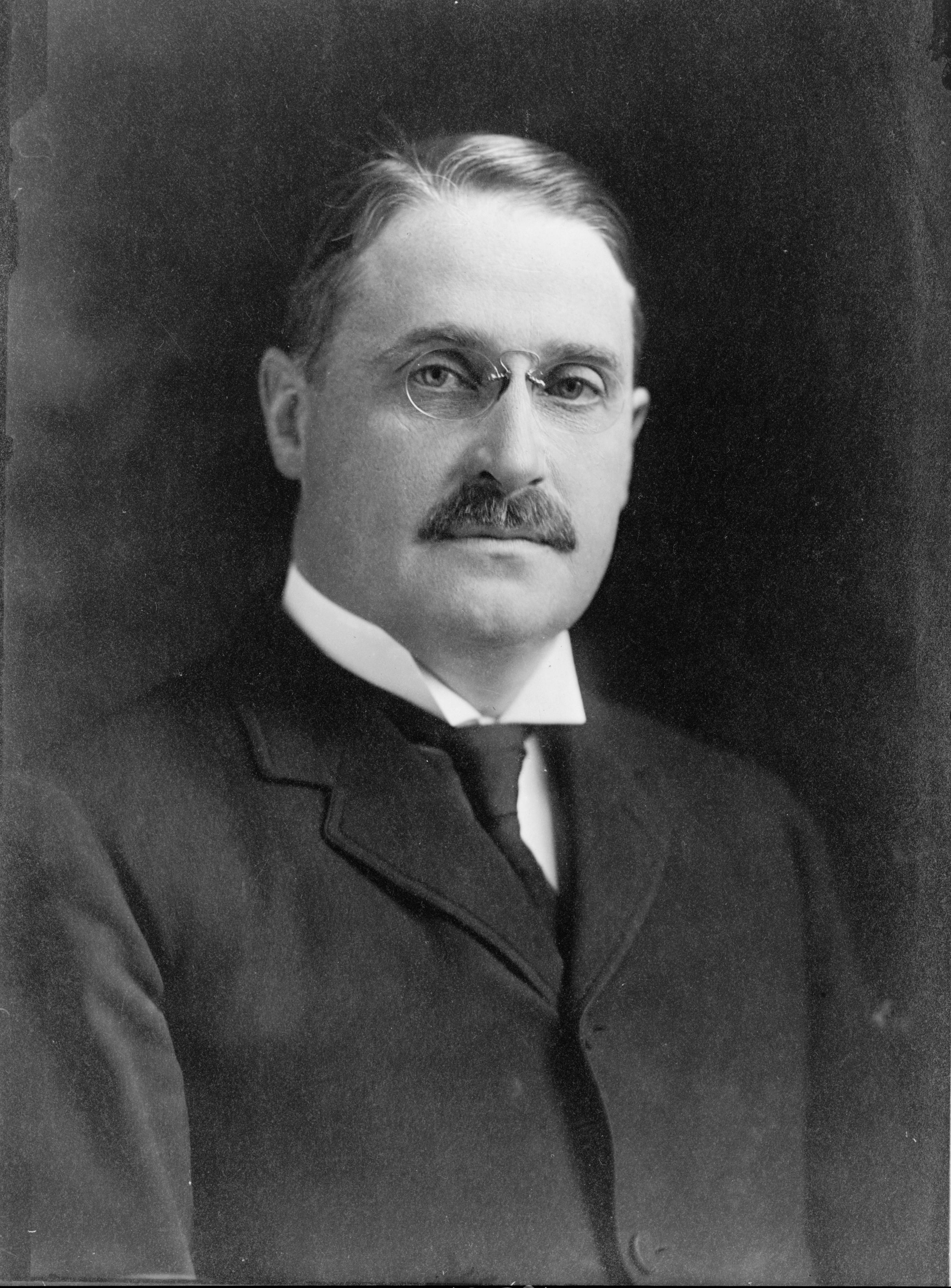

Nominee	Frank B. Brandegee	Simeon E. Baldwin
Party	Republican	Democratic
Popular vote	216,792	131,824
Percentage	49.8%	42.1%
- Brandegee: 40–50% 50–60% 60–70% 70–80% 80–90% Baldwin: 40–50% 50–60% 60–70%
U.S. senator before election
Frank B. Brandegee
Republican
Elected U.S. Senator
Frank B. Brandegee
Republican

The 1914 United States Senate election in Connecticut was held on November 3, 1914.

Incumbent Senator Frank B. Brandegee was re-elected to a second term in office over Democratic U.S. Representative Augustine Lonergan.

== General election ==
=== Candidates ===
- Simeon E. Baldwin, Governor of Connecticut (Democratic)
- Frank B. Brandegee, incumbent Senator since 1905 (Republican)
- Frederick Platt (Prohibition)
- Herbert Smith (Progressive)
- George Spiess (Socialist)
- Clarence Warner (Socialist Labor)

=== Results ===
1914 U.S. Senate election in Connecticut
Party	Candidate	Votes	%
Republican	Frank B. Brandegee (incumbent)	89,983	49.77%
Democratic	Simeon E. Baldwin	76,081	42.08%
Progressive	Herbert Smith	6,853	3.79%
Socialist	George Spiess	5,890	3.26%
Prohibition	Frederick Platt	1,356	0.75%
Socialist Labor	Clarence Warner	650	0.36%
Majority		13,902	7.69%
Total votes		180,813	100.00%
Republican hold			

== See also ==
- 1914 United States Senate elections
