= George C. Williams (Medal of Honor) =

American Union Army soldier

- Born: December 9, 1839; England
- Died: November 14, 1926 (aged 86)
- Buried: Cedar Grove Cemetery
- Allegiance: USA
- Branch: Union Army
- Commands: 1st Battalion of the 14th Infantry Regiment
- Conflicts: American Civil War

George C. Williams (1839–1926) was a soldier in the Union Army during the American Civil War who was awarded the Medal of Honor.

== Biography ==
Williams was born in England on December 9, 1839. He emigrated to the United States and joined the Union Army during the American Civil War. He served as quartermaster sergeant of the 1st Battalion of the 14th Infantry Regiment.

He received the Medal of Honor for gallantry in action on June 27, 1862, at Gaines Mill, Virginia. The medal was issued to Williams on August 28, 1897.

Williams died on November 14, 1926. He is interred at the Cedar Grove Cemetery in New London, Connecticut.

== Medal of Honor citation ==
While on duty with the wagon train as quartermaster sergeant he voluntarily left his place of safety in the rear, joined a company, and fought with distinguished gallantry through the action.
