= Frederick Moynihan =

American sculptor

Frederick J. Moynihan was an American sculptor, born on the Isle of Guernsey in 1843. He died in his New York City studio on January 9, 1910.

Moynihan studied at the Royal Academy of Arts in London before immigrating to the United States. He is best remembered for creating monuments commemorating the American Civil War.

== Public monuments ==
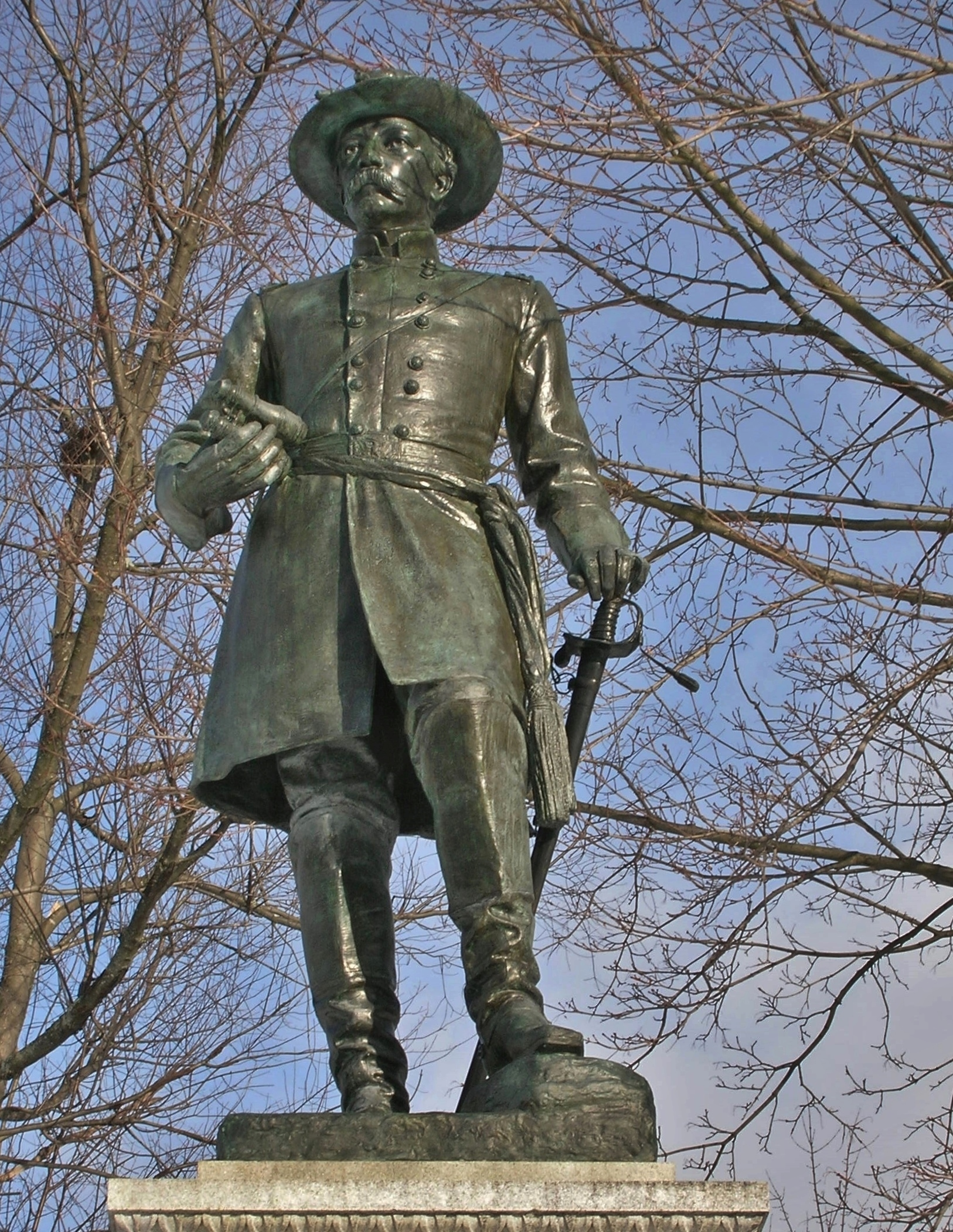
Griffin A. Stedman Monument

- HMS Eurydice, Shanklin Cemetery, Shanklin, Isle of Wight 1880
- Pennsylvania's Ninth "Lochiel" Veteran Cavalry Monument, Chickamauga and Chattanooga National Military Park, Fort Oglethorpe, Georgia 1894
- Company F, 1st US (Vermont) Sharpshooters Monument - Gettysburg, PA 1889
- Vermont Sharpshooters, Companies E & H 2nd Regiment United States Sharpshooters - Gettysburg, PA 1889
- 13th Vermont Infantry Monument Lieutenant Stephen F. Brown- Gettysburg, PA 1899
- Georgia State Monument. Chickamauga and Chattanooga National Military Park, Fort Oglethorpe, Georgia 1899
- Griffin Alexander Stedman Monument, Barry Square, Hartford, Connecticut, 1900
- General Gustavus Sniper, equestrian, Syracuse, New York, 1905
- J.E.B. Stuart, equestrian, Monument Avenue, Richmond, Virginia, 1907

== Gallery ==
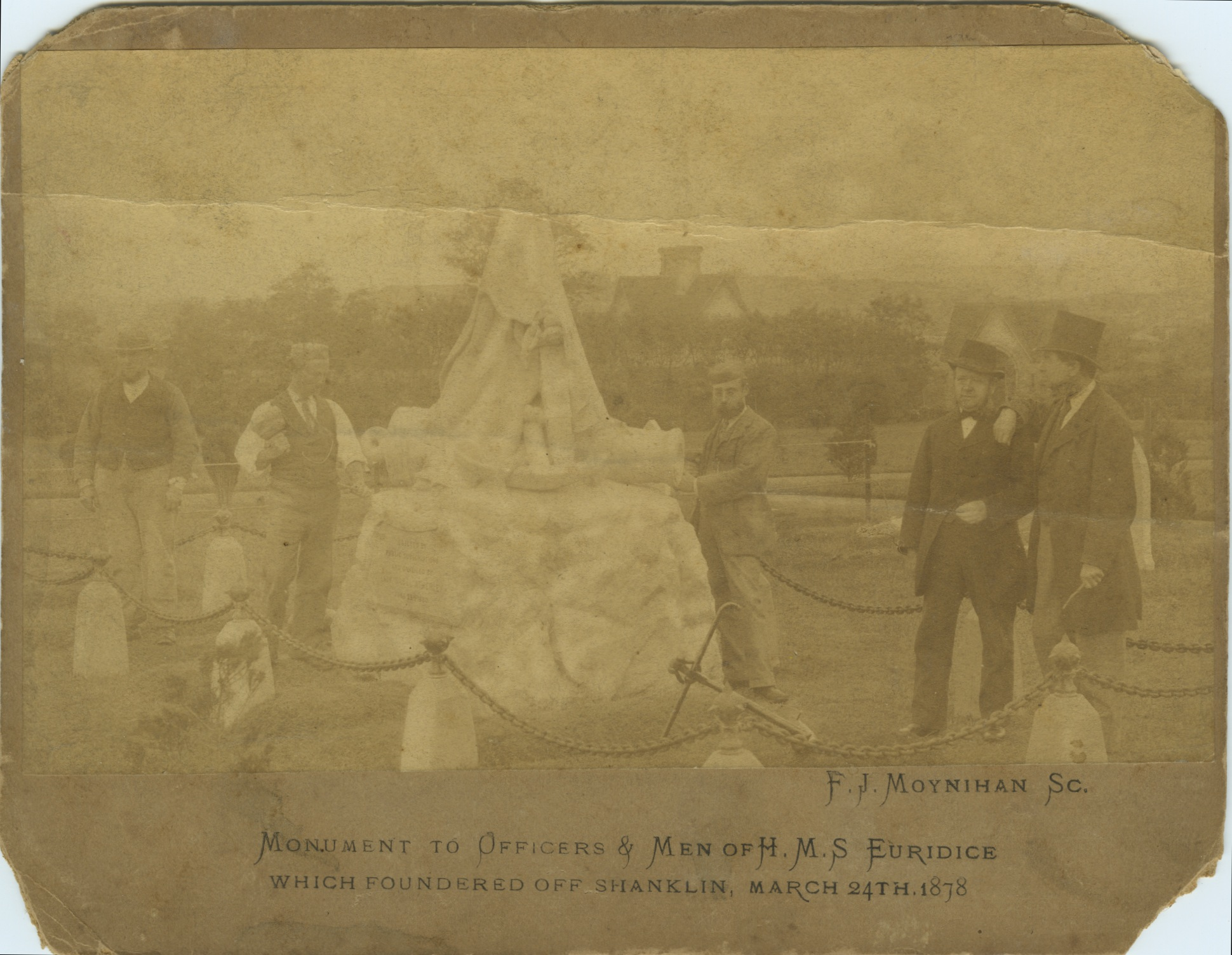
H.M.S Eurydice Memorial 1878
