= John T. Wait =

American politician

John Turner Wait
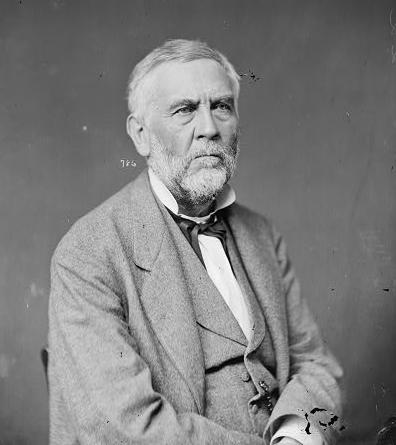

Member of the U.S. House of Representatives from Connecticut's 3rd district
- In office April 12, 1876 – March 3, 1887
- Preceded by: Henry H. Starkweather
- Succeeded by: Charles Addison Russell

President pro tempore of the Connecticut Senate

Member of the Connecticut Senate
- In office 1865-1866

Member of the Connecticut House of Representatives
- In office 1867; 1871; 1873

Personal details
- Born: August 27, 1811
- Died: April 21, 1899 (aged 87)

John Turner Wait (August 27, 1811 – April 21, 1899) was a U.S. representative from Connecticut.

== Biography ==
Born in New London, Connecticut, Wait moved with his mother to Norwich, Connecticut. He attended the common schools and Trinity College, Hartford, Connecticut, for two years. He engaged in mercantile pursuits. He studied law, was admitted to the bar in 1836, and began the practicing law in Norwich this same year.

He served as state's attorney for the county of New London from 1842 to 1844 and 1846 to 1854. He was an unsuccessful candidate for election as Lieutenant Governor of Connecticut in 1854, 1855, 1856, and 1857. He served in the Connecticut Senate in 1865 and 1866, the latter year as president pro tempore. He served as member of the Connecticut House of Representatives in 1867, 1871, and 1873, serving as speaker in 1867.

Wait was elected as a Republican to the Forty-fourth Congress to fill the vacancy caused by the death of Henry H. Starkweather. He was reelected as a Republican to the Forty-fifth and to the four succeeding Congresses, serving from April 12, 1876, to March 3, 1887. He was not a candidate for renomination in 1886, and resumed the practice of his profession.

Congressman Wait was a first cousin of U.S. Chief Justice Morrison Waite.

He died in Norwich, Connecticut, April 21, 1899, and was interred in Yantic Cemetery.

U.S. House of Representatives
Preceded by Henry H. Starkweather	Member of the U.S. House of Representatives from Connecticut's 3rd congressional district 1876-1887	Succeeded by Charles Addison Russell
