= Augustus Brandegee =

American politician (1828–1904)

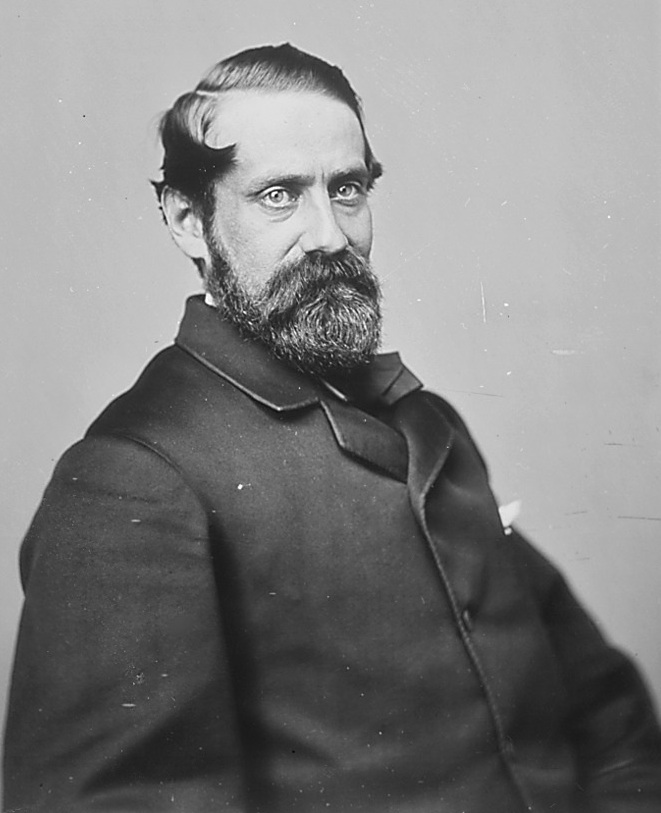

Corporation Counsel of New London, Connecticut
- In office 1897–1898
- Preceded by: John C. Geary
- Succeeded by: John C. Geary

Mayor of New London, Connecticut
- In office 1871–1873
- Preceded by: Frederick L. Allen
- Succeeded by: Thomas M. Waller

Member of the U.S. House of Representatives from Connecticut's 3rd district
- In office March 4, 1863 – March 3, 1867
- Preceded by: Alfred A. Burnham
- Succeeded by: Henry H. Starkweather

Speaker of the Connecticut House of Representatives
- In office 1861
- Preceded by: Oliver Henry Perry
- Succeeded by: Henry C. Deming

Member of the Connecticut House of Representatives
- In office 1854, 1858, 1859, 1861

Personal details
- Born: July 12, 1828 New London, Connecticut
- Died: November 10, 1904 (aged 76) New London, Connecticut
- Resting place: Cedar Grove Cemetery, New London, Connecticut
- Party: Republican
- Spouse: Nancy Christina Bosworth (d. 1881)
- Children: 4 (including Frank B. Brandegee)
- Education: Yale University (BA, LLB)
- Profession: Attorney

Augustus Brandegee (July 12, 1828 – November 10, 1904) was an American lawyer and politician who served in the United States House of Representatives from Connecticut.

== Early life ==
Brandegee was born in New London, Connecticut. He was the son of John Brandegee and Mary Ann Deshon Brandegee. His father was from a Connecticut family, and relocated to New Orleans cotton broker; he later returned to New London and became active in the whaling industry and other business ventures. Brandegee was educated at Union Academy in New London and Hopkins Grammar School in New Haven.

In 1845 Brandegee entered Yale University, where he was elected membership to Delta Kappa Epsilon and Skull and Bones. He graduated in 1849, and then began studying at Yale Law School. Brandegee completed his legal studies in the office of Andrew C. Lippitt in 1850, was admitted to the bar in 1851, and began to practice in partnership with Lippitt.

Brandegee was elected to the Connecticut House of Representatives in 1854. Although a young member of the House, he was selected as a member of the important judiciary committee. He was also chairman of the select committee to manage the "bill for the defense of liberty," which was aimed at preventing the enforcement of the Fugitive Slave Law in Connecticut. Later, Brandegee chaired the committee which oversaw passage of Connecticut's version of the Maine liquor law, which prohibited the sale of alcoholic beverages.

From 1857 to 1859, Brandegee served as Judge of New London's city court. During this time he became a popular speaker in favor of abolishing slavery, and he delivered speeches at locations throughout Connecticut. In 1860, he was chosen as one of Connecticut's electoral college members, on the Republican ticket headed by former Governor Roger Sherman Baldwin; Abraham Lincoln carried Connecticut, and the electors cast their ballots for Lincoln for president and Hannibal Hamlin for vice president.

Brandegee was again elected to the Connecticut House as a Republican in 1858. He was reelected in 1859, but declined the office because of the death of his father. He was elected as the speaker of the Connecticut House of Representatives in 1861. During this first "War" session of the House, Brandegee managed to keep favor with both Democrats and Republicans. At the end of the year, fellow Bonesman and the leader of the Democrats in the House, Henry C. Deming presented him with a silver service as a token of appreciation for his impartiality.

At the start of the Civil War, Brandegee was active in supporting the Union cause. He traveled all over Connecticut addressing meetings, raising troops and arousing public sentiment.

== United States House of Representatives ==
In 1862 he was elected to Congress from the 3rd district of Connecticut. Although the youngest member of the House, he was selected as a member of the House Committee on Naval Affairs, and later the Military Affairs Committee. Brandegee was also on the Committee on Naval Accounts, and Chairman of a Special Committee on constructing a post office and military route from New York City to Washington, D.C.

Respected as an ardent abolitionist as well as a friend of President Abraham Lincoln, he and a fellow Representative, Democrat James E. English of New Haven voted in favor of the momentous 13th Amendment in 1864 that outlawed slavery; Steven Spielberg's 2012 film Lincoln erroneously depicts them as two Connecticut Democrats with fictional names voting against the amendment.

Also in 1864, Brandegee was a member of the Connecticut delegation to the National Republican Convention in Baltimore, which re-nominated President Lincoln, and nominated Andrew Johnson for the Vice Presidency. Brandegee continued in Congress throughout the Reconstruction Era. In 1866 he attended the National Union Convention at Philadelphia. He did not stand for reelection to Congress in 1866, and his term expired in March 1867.

== Post Civil War ==
In 1871, Brandegee was nominated for the office of Mayor of New London. He won and served a single two-year term. He was Chairman of the Connecticut delegation to the Republican National Conventions of 1880 and 1884.

In 1892 he was a founding partner of Noyes & Brandegee, which was one of the leading law firms in New London. After his service as Mayor his fellow Republicans had tried to convince him to run for Governor or Senator, but Brandegee declined any further elected offices, although he served as Corporation Counsel of New London in 1897 and 1898.

Brandegee died in New London on November 10, 1904, and was buried at Cedar Grove Cemetery in New London.

== Legacy ==
At a special meeting of the superior court on December 31, 1904, Judge George D. Stanton said of Brandegee:

August Brandegee, a leader of the New London county bar for half a century, is dead. During all that time he reflected honor upon this bar. He gave to its member an example for emulation. He has left us a memory which is a benediction. We strive through this memorial to show that we appreciate what he was and what he stood for.

He was a learned lawyer. Coming to the bar filled with the learning of the classics, he readily absorbed the law written in the books, and yet was always more than the book lawyer. He never failed to appreciate that the law is not an abstract science, but a rule of action of men. Mercy and charity ever came to him as the hand maidens of legal principle. He approached the real of a cause with diffidence. He participated in the trial as a master.

He was a brilliant orator. Convention, legislature, congress and the courts thrilled with his eloquence. In manner unexcelled he clothed his thoughts in language chaste and beautiful, and drove his words deep into the hearts of his hearers. He stood for high ideals through all his public life. At a time when the Abolitionist met scorn and contumely, he laboured zealously to free the slave. A member of Congress through the war, he became the trusted friend of Lincoln, and rendered signal service for the cause of the Union. And then and ever after he put aside official station for the simple life.

He was a knightly man - hypocrisy, shame, expedients, pretensions - the whole brood of lies and deceits - were his enemies. He fought them all his days and when the end came, passed over God's threshold with escutcheon unstained and with plume untarnished.

== Family ==
Brandegee was the husband of Nancy Christine Bosworth (1840–1881). They were the parents of Augustus (1857–1881), Helen (1858–1915), Frank (1864–1924), and Marian (1866–1884).

Brandegee's son Frank also served as a member of the United States House of Representatives, and was a longtime member of the United States Senate.

== External resources ==
- United States Congress. "Augustus Brandegee (id: B000768)". Biographical Directory of the United States Congress.
- Augustus Brandegee at Find A Grave Archived September 16, 2017, at the Wayback Machine

U.S. House of Representatives
Preceded by Alfred A. Burnham	Member of the U.S. House of Representatives from Connecticut's 3rd congressional district 1863-1867	Succeeded by Henry H. Starkweather
