= Richard Law (judge) =

American politician and judge (1733–1806)

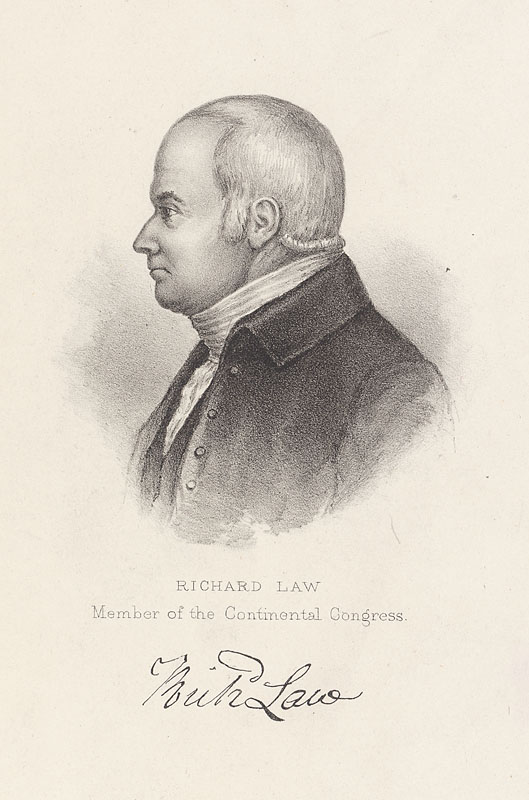

Judge of the United States District Court for the District of Connecticut
- In office September 26, 1789 – January 26, 1806
- Appointed by: George Washington
- Preceded by: Seat established by 1 Stat. 73
- Succeeded by: Pierpont Edwards

Personal details
- Born: Richard Law; March 7, 1733 Milford, Connecticut Colony, British America
- Died: January 26, 1806 (aged 72) New London, Connecticut
- Resting place: Cedar Grove Cemetery; New London, Connecticut
- Children: Lyman Law
- Parent: Jonathan Law (father)
- Relatives: John Law (grandson); William Henry Law (grandson)
- Education: Yale College read law

Richard Law (March 7, 1733 – January 26, 1806) was a delegate to the First Continental Congress, the Second Continental Congress, and the Congress of the Confederation. He was Mayor of New London, Connecticut, and a United States district judge of the United States District Court for the District of Connecticut. In the modern day, he has become infamously known for convicting and sentencing Hannah Ocuish, a 12-year-old Native American girl to death for the murder of a 6-year-old white girl.

== Education and career ==
Born on March 7, 1733, in Milford, Connecticut Colony, British America, Law pursued classical studies, to Jonathan Law. He graduated from Yale College in 1751 and read law in 1755. He was admitted to the bar in January 1755, and entered private practice in Milford from 1755 to 1757. He continued private practice in New London, Connecticut Colony from 1757 to 1765. He was a Justice of the Peace for New London from 1765 to 1775. He was a member of the Connecticut General Assembly from 1765 to 1776. He was Chief Judge of the New London County Court from 1773 to 1784. He was Clerk of the Connecticut General Assembly from 1774 to 1776. He was an assistant to the Connecticut General Assembly from 1776 to 1786. He was a member of the Connecticut Council of Safety in May 1776. He was a delegate, successively to the First Continental Congress, Second Continental Congress and the Congress of the Confederation in 1774, in 1776, in 1777, and from 1780 to 1783. He was a Judge of the Connecticut Superior Court in New London from 1784 to 1789, serving as Chief Judge from 1786 to 1789. He was the Mayor of New London, Connecticut from 1784 to 1806.

=== Execution of Hannah Ocuish ===
In October 1786, Law presided over the trial of twelve-year-old Hannah Ocuish, a half-Pequot Native American girl, for the murder of six-year-old Eunice Bolles. Upon the conclusion of the trial, Law sentenced the young girl to death on October 16, 1786. Ocuish was hanged for the crime on December 20, 1786, three months shy of her thirteenth birthday. In the modern day, her guilt has been disputed and a matter of debate.

== Federal judicial service ==
Law was nominated by President George Washington on September 24, 1789, to the United States District Court for the District of Connecticut, to a new seat authorized by 1 Stat. 73. He was confirmed by the United States Senate on September 26, 1789, and received his commission the same day. His service terminated on January 26, 1806, due to his death in New London. He was interred in Cedar Grove Cemetery in New London.

== Family ==
Law was the father of Lyman Law, a United States representative from Connecticut, and grandfather of William Henry Law, a Connecticut politician, and John Law, a United States Representative from Indiana.

== Sources ==
- United States Congress. "Richard Law (id: L000127)". Biographical Directory of the United States Congress. (erroneously listed as having been a judge on the Connecticut Supreme Court instead of the Connecticut Superior Court)
- Richard Law at the Biographical Directory of Federal Judges, a publication of the Federal Judicial Center.
- Streib, Victor L., Death Penalty for Juveniles. Indiana University Press. 1987. Pgs 74–75.

Party political offices
First	Democratic-Republican nominee for Governor of Connecticut; 1801	Succeeded by Ephraim Kirby
Legal offices
Preceded by Seat established by 1 Stat. 73	Judge of the United States District Court for the District of Connecticut; 1789–1806	Succeeded by Pierpont Edwards
