= Frank B. Brandegee =

American politician (1864–1924)

Frank Brandegee
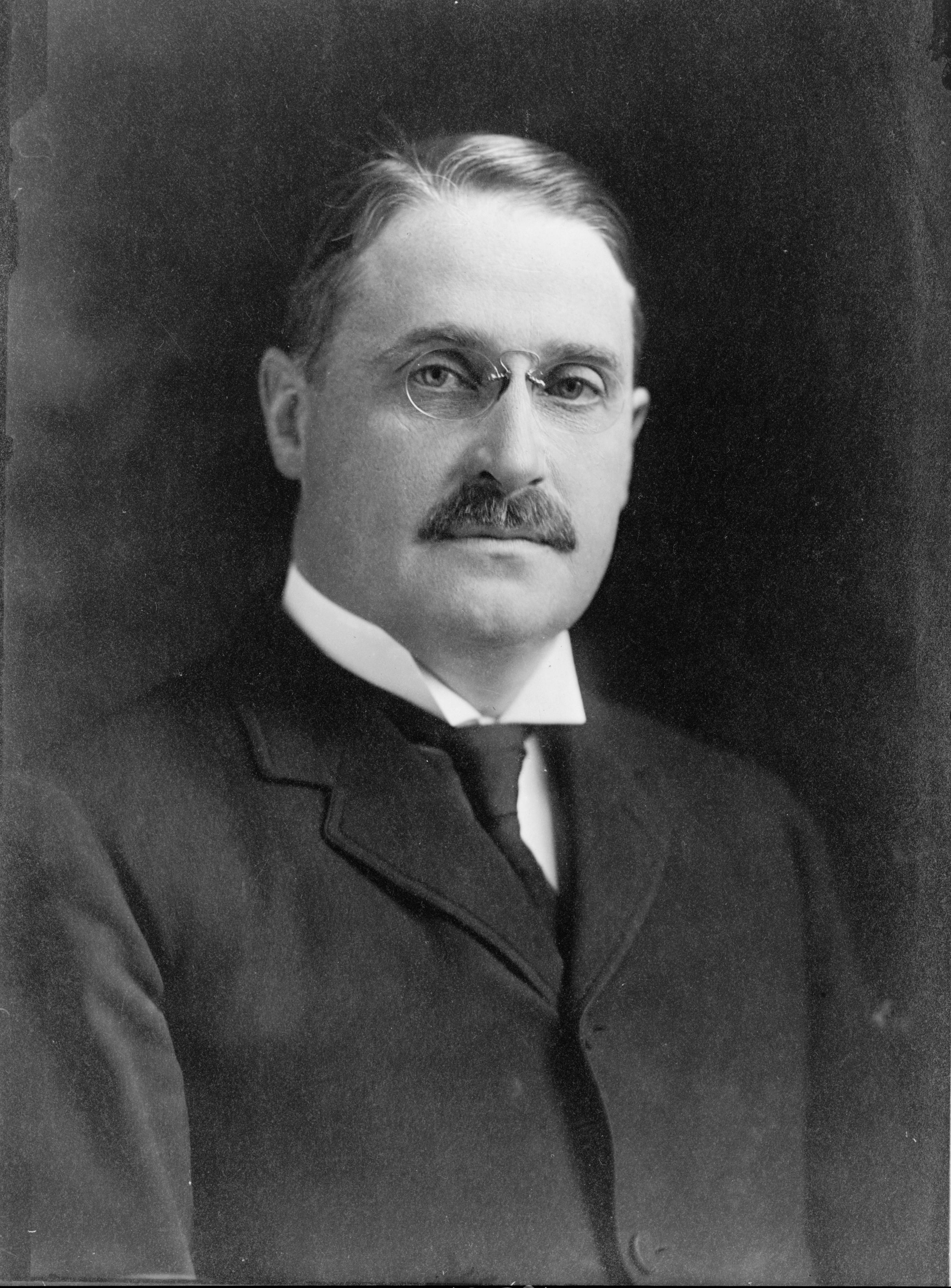
- Brandegee in 1910

United States Senator from Connecticut
- In office May 10, 1905 – October 14, 1924
- Preceded by: Orville H. Platt
- Succeeded by: Hiram Bingham III

Member of the U.S. House of Representatives from Connecticut's 3rd district
- In office November 4, 1902 – May 10, 1905
- Preceded by: Charles A. Russell
- Succeeded by: Edwin W. Higgins

Speaker of the Connecticut House of Representatives
- In office 1899–1901
- Preceded by: Joseph L. Barbour
- Succeeded by: John H. Light

Member of the Connecticut House of Representatives from New London
- In office 1899–1901
- In office 1889–1891

Personal details
- Born: Frank Bosworth Brandegee; July 8, 1864 New London, Connecticut, U.S.
- Died: October 14, 1924 (aged 60) Washington, D.C., U.S.
- Resting place: Cedar Grove Cemetery, New London, Connecticut
- Party: Republican
- Education: Yale College
- Profession: Attorney

Frank Bosworth Brandegee (July 8, 1864 – October 14, 1924) was a United States representative and senator from Connecticut.

== Early life and education ==
Brandegee was born in New London, Connecticut, on July 8, 1864. He was the son of Augustus Brandegee, who also served in the United States House, and his wife.

Brandegee graduated from New London's Bulkeley High School in 1881. He completed his degree at Yale College in 1885, where he was a member of Skull and Bones. He studied law, and was admitted to the bar in 1888 and practiced in New London.

A Republican, in 1888 Brandegee served in the Connecticut House of Representatives. He was appointed and worked as New London's Corporation Counsel from 1889 to 1893 and 1894 to 1897.

He returned to the Connecticut House in 1899 and served as Speaker. He served again as New London's Corporation Counsel from 1901 to 1902 when he resigned because he had been elected to Congress.

== U.S. House ==
Brandegee was elected as a Republican to the Fifty-seventh Congress to fill the vacancy caused by the death of Charles A. Russell. He was reelected to the Fifty-eighth and Fifty-ninth Congresses and served from November 4, 1902, until May 10, 1905, when he resigned.

Brandegee was a delegate to several state and national Republican conventions, and was chairman of the Connecticut Republican Party's 1904 state convention.

== U.S. Senate ==
Brandegee resigned from the House to accept election to the U.S. Senate, filling the vacancy caused by the death of Orville H. Platt.

He was reelected in 1908, 1914, and 1920, and served from May 10, 1905, until his death.

A staunch "Old Guard" conservative, Brandegee opposed women's suffrage and America's participation in the League of Nations. In 1920 Brandegee was also one of the chief promoters of Warren G. Harding for the US presidency.

In the Senate he was Chairman of the following committees: Interoceanic Canals (Sixty-second Congress); Panama (Sixty-second Congress); Pacific Railroads (Sixty-third through Sixty-fifth Congresses); Library (Sixty-sixth and Sixty-seventh Congresses); and Judiciary (Sixty-eighth Congress).

Brandegee was President pro tempore on two days (March 25–26, 1912).

== Death and burial ==
Brandegee never married and had no children.

He killed himself in Washington, D.C. on October 14, 1924, inhaling fumes from a gas light in a seldom used bathroom on the third floor of his home. According to published accounts, he was in ill health and had lost most of his fortune through bad investments. Press reports at the time indicated that he left his chauffeur a suicide note and $100, with another $100 for two other household servants.

He was interred at Cedar Grove Cemetery in New London.

== See also ==
- List of members of the United States Congress who died in office (1900–1949)

Party political offices
First	Republican nominee for U.S. Senator from Connecticut (Class 3); 1914, 1920	Succeeded by Hiram Bingham III
U.S. House of Representatives
Preceded by Charles A. Russell	Member of the U.S. House of Representatives from Connecticut's 3rd congressional district 1902–1905	Succeeded by Edwin W. Higgins
U.S. Senate
Preceded by Orville H. Platt	U.S. senator (Class 3) from Connecticut; 1905–1924; Served alongside: Morgan Bulkeley, George P. McLean	Succeeded by Hiram Bingham III
Political offices
Preceded by William P. Frye	President pro tempore of the United States Senate; Rotating pro tems	Succeeded by James P. Clarke
Preceded by Knute Nelson	Chairman of the Senate Judiciary Committee; 1923–1924	Succeeded by Albert B. Cummins
