= Edwin W. Higgins =

American politician (1874–1954)

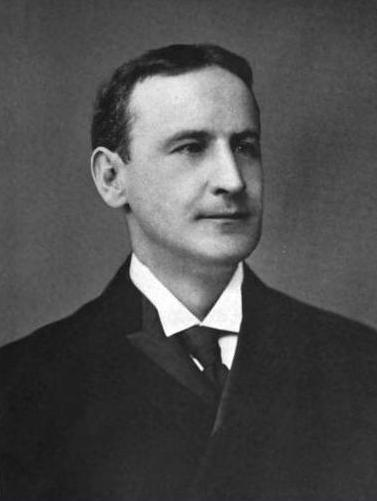
- Higgins in c. 1906.

Member of the U.S. House of Representatives from Connecticut
- In office October 2, 1905 – March 3, 1913
- Preceded by: Frank B. Brandegee
- Succeeded by: Thomas L. Reilly

Member of the Connecticut House of Representatives
- In office 1899–1900

Personal details
- Born: Edwin Werter Higgins; July 2, 1874 Clinton, Connecticut, United States
- Died: September 24, 1954 (aged 80) Norwich, Connecticut, United States
- Party: Republican
- Education: Norwich Free Academy; Yale Law School
- Occupation: Politician, lawyer

Military service
- Allegiance: United States
- Branch/service: Connecticut State National Guard

Edwin Werter Higgins (July 2, 1874 – September 24, 1954) was an American politician and lawyer who served as a U.S. representative from Connecticut's 3rd congressional district from 1905 to 1912. He also served in the Connecticut House of Representatives.

== Biography ==
Born in Clinton, Connecticut, Higgins attended Norwich Free Academy. He graduated from Yale Law School in 1897, having served as secretary of the Kent Club and been a member of Phi Sigma Kappa.

Higgins was admitted to the bar in 1897, and commenced practice in Norwich, Connecticut. He served as a member of the state house of representatives in 1899 and 1900, as well as a member of the Republican State Central Committee from 1900 to 1905. During the same period he served as health officer of New London County. From 1901-1904 he served in the Connecticut State National Guard. He also held the post of corporation counsel of Norwich in 1901, 1902, and from 1919 to 1922, served as prosecuting attorney of Norwich in 1905, and was a delegate to the Republican National Convention in 1904 and in 1916.

Higgins was elected as a Republican to the 59th Congress to fill the vacancy caused by the resignation of Frank B. Brandegee. Reelected to the 60th, 61st, and 62nd Congresses and serving from October 2, 1905 until March 3, 1913, he was not a candidate for renomination in 1912, and resumed his law practice after leaving Congress. During the First World War, he again served in the Connecticut State National Guard.

From 1932 to 1946 Higgins served as prosecuting attorney, Court of Common Pleas, Connecticut. He died in Norwich, Connecticut, on September 24, 1954, and was interred in Maplewood Cemetery.

U.S. House of Representatives
Preceded by Frank B. Brandegee	Member of the U.S. House of Representatives from Connecticut's 3rd congressional district October 2, 1905 – March 3, 1913	Succeeded by Thomas L. Reilly
