= House Democratic Caucus =

Party caucus in the US House of Representatives

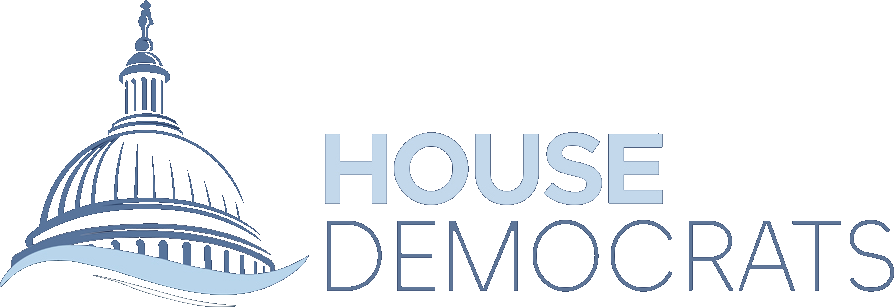
- Part of: United States House of Representatives
- Floor Leader: Hakeem Jeffries (NY–8)
- Floor Whip: Katherine Clark (MA–5)
- Chair: Pete Aguilar (CA–33)
- Ideology: Liberalism
- Political position: Center to center-left
- Affiliation: Democratic Party
- Colors: Blue
- Seats: 214 / 435

Website
- dems.gov

The House Democratic Caucus is a congressional caucus composed of all Democratic representatives in the United States House of Representatives, voting and non-voting, and is responsible for nominating and electing the Democratic Party leadership in the chamber. In its roles as a party conference, the caucus writes and enforces rules of conduct and discipline for its members, approves committee assignments, and serves as the primary forum for development of party policy and legislative priorities. It hosts weekly meetings for these purposes and to communicate the party's message to members.

When the caucus holds the majority of seats, it is usually led by the speaker of the U.S. House of Representatives who is assisted on the floor by the House majority leader and the party's chief whip. When in the minority, it is led by the House minority leader, assisted by the chief whip. The caucus has a Caucus chairman and Caucus vice-chair (formerly called the secretary). For the 119th Congress, Hakeem Jeffries was elected as the minority leader, Katherine Clark became the minority whip and Pete Aguilar was chosen as the Caucus chairman.

== Current hierarchy ==
Effective with the start of the 119th Congress, the chain of command conference leadership is as follows (from highest to lowest):

- Hakeem Jeffries (NY–8) as House Minority Leader (Caucus Leader)
- Katherine Clark (MA–5) as House Minority Whip
- Pete Aguilar (CA–33) as Caucus Chairman
- Ted Lieu (CA–36) as Caucus Vice Chair

== Leadership history ==
The House Democratic Caucus, through its institutional antecedent, the Democratic-Republican caucus, was established on April 2, 1796, to stop a treaty with Great Britain which unfairly treated American sailors. For many years, through 1820, it nominated presidential candidates (before the era of national nominating conventions).

Since 2023, the House Democratic leader has been Rep. Hakeem Jeffries of New York (the first African-American congressional party leader in U.S. history). He was elected to succeed longtime Democratic leader and the first woman speaker of the House in U.S. history Nancy Pelosi.

At the Organizational Meeting on November 18, 2008, of the Democratic Caucus for the 111th Congress, Representative John B. Larson (D-Connecticut) was elected Caucus chairman by acclamation. The election was presided over by the outgoing chairman of the Democratic Caucus for the 110th Congress, former representative Rahm Emanuel (D-Illinois). Rep. Larson officially assumed the position of chairman on the first day of the 111th Congress, January 3, 2009.

After his election as chairman at the Organizational Meeting on November 18, Chairman Larson presided over the election of Rep. Xavier Becerra (D-California), who defeated Representative Marcy Kaptur of Ohio by a vote count of 175 to 67. Rep. Becerra likewise assumed his vice-chairmanship on January 3.

== Leaders of the House Democratic Caucus ==
Congress	Leader	District	Took office	Left office	House Speaker
20th	Andrew Stevenson (1784–1857)	Virginia 9	December 3, 1827	June 2, 1834 (Note: Resigned from office and from Congress.)	Himself 1827–1834
21st	Andrew Stevenson (1784–1857)	Virginia 9	December 3, 1827	June 2, 1834	Himself 1827–1834
22nd	Andrew Stevenson (1784–1857)	Virginia 9	December 3, 1827	June 2, 1834	Himself 1827–1834
23rd	Andrew Stevenson (1784–1857)	Virginia 11	December 3, 1827	June 2, 1834	Himself 1827–1834
23rd	John Bell (1796–1869)	Tennessee 7	June 2, 1834	March 4, 1835	Himself 1834–1835
24th	James K. Polk (1795–1849)	Tennessee 9	December 7, 1835	March 4, 1839	Himself 1835–1839
25th	James K. Polk (1795–1849)	Tennessee 9	December 7, 1835	March 4, 1839	Himself 1835–1839
26th	Unknown (Note: Whoever held this office during this Congress is unknown.)				Hunter 1839–1841
27th	Unknown				White 1841–1843
28th	John Winston Jones (1791–1848)	Virginia 6	December 4, 1843	March 4, 1845	Himself 1843–1845
29th	John Wesley Davis (1799–1859)	Indiana 6	December 1, 1845	March 4, 1847	Himself 1845–1847
30th	Unknown				Winthrop 1847–1849
31st	Howell Cobb (1815–1868)	Georgia 6	December 22, 1849	March 4, 1851	Himself 1849–1851
32nd	Linn Boyd (1800–1859)	Kentucky 1	December 1, 1851	March 4, 1855	Himself 1851–1855
33rd	Linn Boyd (1800–1859)	Kentucky 1	December 1, 1851	March 4, 1855	Himself 1851–1855
34th	George Washington Jones (1806–1884)	Tennessee 6	March 4, 1855	March 4, 1857	Banks 1856–1857
35th	James Lawrence Orr (1822–1873)	South Carolina 5	December 7, 1857	March 3, 1859	Himself 1857–1859
36th	George S. Houston (1811–1879)	Alabama 5	March 4, 1859	January 21, 1861 (Note: Alabama seceded from the Union on January 11, 1861, and Houston withdrew from Congress ten days later on January 21.)	Pennington 1860–1861
37th	Unknown (Note: Whoever held this office during this Congress is unknown, although it was likely vacant due to the American Civil War.)				Grow 1861–1863
38th	Unknown				Colfax 1863–1869
39th	Unknown				Colfax 1863–1869
40th	Unknown				Colfax 1863–1869
40th	Unknown				Pomeroy 1869
41st	Samuel J. Randall (1828–1890)	Pennsylvania 1	March 4, 1869	March 3, 1871	Blaine 1869–1875
41st	William E. Niblack (1822–1893)	Indiana 1	March 4, 1869	March 3, 1871	Blaine 1869–1875
42nd	Unknown				Blaine 1869–1875
43rd	William E. Niblack (1822–1893)	Indiana 1	March 4, 1873	March 3, 1875	Blaine 1869–1875
44th	Michael C. Kerr (1827–1876)	Indiana 3	December 6, 1875	August 19, 1876 (Note: Died in office.)	Himself 1875–1876
44th	Samuel J. Randall (1828–1890)	Pennsylvania 3	December 4, 1876	March 3, 1881	Himself 1876–1881
45th	Samuel J. Randall (1828–1890)	Pennsylvania 3	December 4, 1876	March 3, 1881	Himself 1876–1881
46th	Samuel J. Randall (1828–1890)	Pennsylvania 3	December 4, 1876	March 3, 1881	Himself 1876–1881
47th	Unknown				Keifer 1881–1883
48th	John G. Carlisle (1834–1910)	Kentucky 6	December 3, 1883	March 3, 1889	Himself 1883–1889
49th	John G. Carlisle (1834–1910)	Kentucky 6	December 3, 1883	March 3, 1889	Himself 1883–1889
50th	John G. Carlisle (1834–1910)	Kentucky 6	December 3, 1883	March 3, 1889	Himself 1883–1889
51st	William S. Holman (1822–1897)	Indiana 4	March 4, 1889	March 3, 1891	Reed 1889–1891
52nd	Charles Frederick Crisp (1845–1896)	Georgia 3	December 8, 1891	March 3, 1895	Himself 1891–1895
53rd	Charles Frederick Crisp (1845–1896)	Georgia 3	December 8, 1891	March 3, 1895	Himself 1891–1895
54th	David B. Culberson (1830–1900)	Texas 4	March 4, 1895	March 3, 1897	Reed 1895–1899
55th	James D. Richardson (1843–1914)	Tennessee 5	March 4, 1897	March 3, 1903	Reed 1895–1899
56th	James D. Richardson (1843–1914)	Tennessee 5	March 4, 1897	March 3, 1903	Henderson 1899–1903
57th	James D. Richardson (1843–1914)	Tennessee 5	March 4, 1897	March 3, 1903	Henderson 1899–1903
58th	John Sharp Williams (1854–1932)	Mississippi 8	March 4, 1903	March 3, 1909	Cannon 1903–1911
59th	John Sharp Williams (1854–1932)	Mississippi 8	March 4, 1903	March 3, 1909	Cannon 1903–1911
60th	John Sharp Williams (1854–1932)	Mississippi 8	March 4, 1903	March 3, 1909	Cannon 1903–1911
61st	Champ Clark (1850–1921)	Missouri 9	March 4, 1909	March 2, 1921	Cannon 1903–1911
62nd	Champ Clark (1850–1921)	Missouri 9	March 4, 1909	March 2, 1921	Himself 1911–1919
63rd	Champ Clark (1850–1921)	Missouri 9	March 4, 1909	March 2, 1921	Himself 1911–1919
64th	Champ Clark (1850–1921)	Missouri 9	March 4, 1909	March 2, 1921	Himself 1911–1919
65th	Champ Clark (1850–1921)	Missouri 9	March 4, 1909	March 2, 1921	Himself 1911–1919
66th	Champ Clark (1850–1921)	Missouri 9	March 4, 1909	March 2, 1921	Gillett 1919–1925
67th	Claude Kitchin (1869–1923)	North Carolina 2	March 4, 1921	March 4, 1923	Gillett 1919–1925
68th	Finis J. Garrett (1875–1956)	Tennessee 9	March 4, 1923	March 3, 1929	Gillett 1919–1925
69th	Finis J. Garrett (1875–1956)	Tennessee 9	March 4, 1923	March 3, 1929	Longworth 1925–1931
70th	Finis J. Garrett (1875–1956)	Tennessee 9	March 4, 1923	March 3, 1929	Longworth 1925–1931
71st	John Nance Garner (1868–1967)	Texas 15	March 4, 1929	March 3, 1933 (Note: Resigned to become Vice President of the United States.)	Longworth 1925–1931
72nd	John Nance Garner (1868–1967)	Texas 15	March 4, 1929	March 3, 1933	Himself 1931–1933
73rd	Henry Thomas Rainey (1860–1934)	Illinois 20	March 9, 1933	August 19, 1934	Himself 1933–1934
74th	Jo Byrns (1869–1936)	Tennessee 5	January 3, 1935	June 4, 1936	Himself 1935–1936
74th	William B. Bankhead (1874–1940)	Alabama 7	June 4, 1936	September 15, 1940	Himself 1936–1940
75th	William B. Bankhead (1874–1940)	Alabama 7	June 4, 1936	September 15, 1940	Himself 1936–1940
76th	William B. Bankhead (1874–1940)	Alabama 7	June 4, 1936	September 15, 1940	Himself 1936–1940
76th	Sam Rayburn (1882–1961)	Texas 4	September 16, 1940	November 16, 1961	Himself 1940–1947
77th	Sam Rayburn (1882–1961)	Texas 4	September 16, 1940	November 16, 1961	Himself 1940–1947
78th	Sam Rayburn (1882–1961)	Texas 4	September 16, 1940	November 16, 1961	Himself 1940–1947
79th	Sam Rayburn (1882–1961)	Texas 4	September 16, 1940	November 16, 1961	Himself 1940–1947
80th	Sam Rayburn (1882–1961)	Texas 4	September 16, 1940	November 16, 1961	Martin 1947–1949
81st	Sam Rayburn (1882–1961)	Texas 4	September 16, 1940	November 16, 1961	Himself 1949–1953
82nd	Sam Rayburn (1882–1961)	Texas 4	September 16, 1940	November 16, 1961	Himself 1949–1953
83rd	Sam Rayburn (1882–1961)	Texas 4	September 16, 1940	November 16, 1961	Martin 1953–1955
84th	Sam Rayburn (1882–1961)	Texas 4	September 16, 1940	November 16, 1961	Himself 1955–1961
85th	Sam Rayburn (1882–1961)	Texas 4	September 16, 1940	November 16, 1961	Himself 1955–1961
86th	Sam Rayburn (1882–1961)	Texas 4	September 16, 1940	November 16, 1961	Himself 1955–1961
87th	Sam Rayburn (1882–1961)	Texas 4	September 16, 1940	November 16, 1961	Himself 1955–1961
87th	John W. McCormack (1891–1980)	Massachusetts 12	January 10, 1962	January 3, 1971	Himself 1962–1971
88th	John W. McCormack (1891–1980)	Massachusetts 9	January 10, 1962	January 3, 1971	Himself 1962–1971
89th	John W. McCormack (1891–1980)	Massachusetts 9	January 10, 1962	January 3, 1971	Himself 1962–1971
90th	John W. McCormack (1891–1980)	Massachusetts 9	January 10, 1962	January 3, 1971	Himself 1962–1971
91st	John W. McCormack (1891–1980)	Massachusetts 9	January 10, 1962	January 3, 1971	Himself 1962–1971
92nd	Carl Albert (1908–2000)	Oklahoma 3	January 21, 1971	January 3, 1977	Himself 1971–1977
93rd	Carl Albert (1908–2000)	Oklahoma 3	January 21, 1971	January 3, 1977	Himself 1971–1977
94th	Carl Albert (1908–2000)	Oklahoma 3	January 21, 1971	January 3, 1977	Himself 1971–1977
95th	Tip O'Neill (1912–1994)	Massachusetts 8	January 4, 1977	January 3, 1987	Himself 1977–1987
96th	Tip O'Neill (1912–1994)	Massachusetts 8	January 4, 1977	January 3, 1987	Himself 1977–1987
97th	Tip O'Neill (1912–1994)	Massachusetts 8	January 4, 1977	January 3, 1987	Himself 1977–1987
98th	Tip O'Neill (1912–1994)	Massachusetts 8	January 4, 1977	January 3, 1987	Himself 1977–1987
99th	Tip O'Neill (1912–1994)	Massachusetts 8	January 4, 1977	January 3, 1987	Himself 1977–1987
100th	Jim Wright (1922–2015)	Texas 12	January 6, 1987	June 6, 1989	Himself 1987–1989
101st	Jim Wright (1922–2015)	Texas 12	January 6, 1987	June 6, 1989	Himself 1987–1989
101st	Tom Foley (1929–2013)	Washington 5	June 6, 1989	January 3, 1995	Himself 1989–1995
102nd	Tom Foley (1929–2013)	Washington 5	June 6, 1989	January 3, 1995	Himself 1989–1995
103rd	Tom Foley (1929–2013)	Washington 5	June 6, 1989	January 3, 1995	Himself 1989–1995
104th	Dick Gephardt (born 1941)	Missouri 3	January 3, 1995	January 3, 2003	Gingrich 1995–1999
105th	Dick Gephardt (born 1941)	Missouri 3	January 3, 1995	January 3, 2003	Gingrich 1995–1999
106th	Dick Gephardt (born 1941)	Missouri 3	January 3, 1995	January 3, 2003	Hastert 1999–2007
107th	Dick Gephardt (born 1941)	Missouri 3	January 3, 1995	January 3, 2003	Hastert 1999–2007
108th	Nancy Pelosi (born 1940)	California 8	January 3, 2003	January 3, 2023	Hastert 1999–2007
109th	Nancy Pelosi (born 1940)	California 8	January 3, 2003	January 3, 2023	Hastert 1999–2007
110th	Nancy Pelosi (born 1940)	California 8	January 3, 2003	January 3, 2023	Herself 2007–2011
111th	Nancy Pelosi (born 1940)	California 8	January 3, 2003	January 3, 2023	Herself 2007–2011
112th	Nancy Pelosi (born 1940)	California 8	January 3, 2003	January 3, 2023	Boehner 2011–2015
113th	Nancy Pelosi (born 1940)	California 12	January 3, 2003	January 3, 2023	Boehner 2011–2015
114th	Nancy Pelosi (born 1940)	California 12	January 3, 2003	January 3, 2023	Boehner 2011–2015
114th	Nancy Pelosi (born 1940)	California 12	January 3, 2003	January 3, 2023	Ryan 2015–2019
115th	Nancy Pelosi (born 1940)	California 12	January 3, 2003	January 3, 2023	Ryan 2015–2019
116th	Nancy Pelosi (born 1940)	California 12	January 3, 2003	January 3, 2023	Herself 2019–2023
117th	Nancy Pelosi (born 1940)	California 12	January 3, 2003	January 3, 2023	Herself 2019–2023
118th	Hakeem Jeffries (born 1970)	New York 8	January 3, 2023	Incumbent	McCarthy 2023
118th	Hakeem Jeffries (born 1970)	New York 8	January 3, 2023	Incumbent	McHenry (Note: This person served as speaker pro tempore.) 2023
118th	Hakeem Jeffries (born 1970)	New York 8	January 3, 2023	Incumbent	Johnson 2023–present
119th	Hakeem Jeffries (born 1970)	New York 8	January 3, 2023	Incumbent	Johnson 2023–present

== List of chairs ==
Chairs are currently limited to two consecutive terms.

Officeholder	State	Congress	Term
James Thompson	Pennsylvania	31st	1849–1851
N/A		32nd	1851–1853
Edson B. Olds	Ohio	33rd	1853–1855
George Washington Jones	Tennessee	34th	1855–1857
N/A		35th	1857–1859
George S. Houston	Alabama	36th	1859–1861
N/A		37th–40th	1861–1869
William E. Niblack, Samuel J. Randall	Indiana, Pennsylvania	41st	1869–1871
N/A		42nd	1871–1873
William E. Niblack	Indiana	43rd	1873–1875
Lucius Q.C. Lamar	Mississippi	44th	1875–1877
Hiester Clymer	Pennsylvania	45th	1877–1879
John F. House	Tennessee	46th	1879–1881
N/A		47th	1881–1883
George W. Geddes	Ohio	48th	1883–1885
J. Randolph Tucker	Virginia	49th	1885–1887
Samuel S. Cox	New York	50th	1887–1889
William S. Holman	Indiana	51st–53rd	1889–1895
David B. Culberson	Texas	54th	1895–1897
James D. Richardson	Tennessee	55th	1897–1899
James Hay	Virginia	56th–58th	1899–1905
Robert L. Henry	Texas	59th	1905–1907
Henry D. Clayton	Alabama	60th–61st	1907–1911
Albert S. Burleson	Texas	62nd	1911–1913
A. Mitchell Palmer	Pennsylvania	63rd	1913–1915
Edward W. Saunders	Virginia	64th–65th	1915–1919
Arthur G. DeWalt	Pennsylvania	66th	1919–1921
Sam Rayburn	Texas	67th	1921–1923
Henry T. Rainey	Illinois	68th	1923–1925
Charles D. Carter	Oklahoma	69th	1925–1927
Arthur H. Greenwood	Indiana	70th	1927–1929
David H. Kincheloe	Kentucky	71st	1929–1930
William W. Arnold	Illinois	72nd	1931–1933
Clarence F. Lea	California	73rd	1933–1935
Edward T. Taylor	Colorado	74th	1935–1937
Robert L. Doughton	North Carolina	75th	1937–1939
John W. McCormack	Massachusetts	76th	1939–1940
Richard M. Duncan	Missouri	77th	1941–1943
Harry R. Sheppard	California	78th	1943–1945
Jere Cooper	Tennessee	79th	1945–1947
Aime J. Forand	Rhode Island	80th	1947–1949
Francis E. Walter	Pennsylvania	81st	1949–1951
Jere Cooper	Tennessee	82nd	1951–1953
Wilbur D. Mills	Arkansas	83rd	1953–1955
John J. Rooney	New York	84th	1955–1957
Melvin Price	Illinois	85th–86th	1957–1961
Francis E. Walter	Pennsylvania	87th–88th	1961–1963
Albert Thomas	Texas	88th	1964–1965
Eugene Keogh	New York	89th	1965–1967
Dan Rostenkowski	Illinois	90th–91st	1967–1971
Olin Teague	Texas	92nd–93rd	1971–1975
Phillip Burton	California	94th	1976–1977
Thomas S. Foley	Washington	95th–96th	1977–1981
Gillis W. Long	Louisiana	97th–98th	1981–1985
Richard A. Gephardt	Missouri	99th–100th	1985–1989
William H. Gray III	Pennsylvania	101st	1989
Steny H. Hoyer	Maryland	101st–103rd	1989–1995
Vic Fazio	California	104th–105th	1995–1999
Martin Frost	Texas	106th–107th	1999–2003
Bob Menendez	New Jersey	108th–109th	2003–2006
James Clyburn	South Carolina	109th	2006–2007
Rahm Emanuel	Illinois	110th	2007–2009
John B. Larson	Connecticut	111th–112th	2009–2013
Xavier Becerra	California	113th–114th	2013–2017
Joe Crowley	New York	115th	2017–2019
Hakeem Jeffries	New York	116th–117th	2019–2023
Pete Aguilar	California	118th–119th	2023–present

== List of vice-chairs ==
The vice-chair of the Democratic Caucus ranks just below the Chair of the House Democratic Caucus. In addition to other duties, the vice-chair has a seat on the Steering and Policy Committee.

- Mary Rose Oakar (1987–1989)
- Steny Hoyer (1989)
- Vic Fazio (1989–1995)
- Barbara B. Kennelly (1995–1999)
- Bob Menendez (1999–2003)
- Jim Clyburn (2003–2006)
- John B. Larson (2006–2009)
- Xavier Becerra (2009–2012)
- Joe Crowley (2012–2017)
- Linda Sánchez (2017–2019)
- Katherine Clark (2019–2021)
- Pete Aguilar (2021–2023)
- Ted Lieu (2023–present)

== List of secretaries ==
The office of secretary of the Democratic Caucus preceded the office of vice-chair. Until its elimination in 1987, the office of secretary was reserved for a female member of the House.

- Chase G. Woodhouse (1949–1951)
- Edna F. Kelly (1953–1957, 1964–1965)
- Leonor K. Sullivan (1959–1964, 1965–1975)
- Patsy Mink (1975–1977)
- Shirley Chisholm (1977–1981)
- Geraldine Ferraro (1981–1985)
- Mary Rose Oakar (1985–1987)

== See also ==
- House Republican Conference
- Senate Democratic Caucus
- Senate Republican Conference
