= William E. Niblack =

American judge (1822–1893)

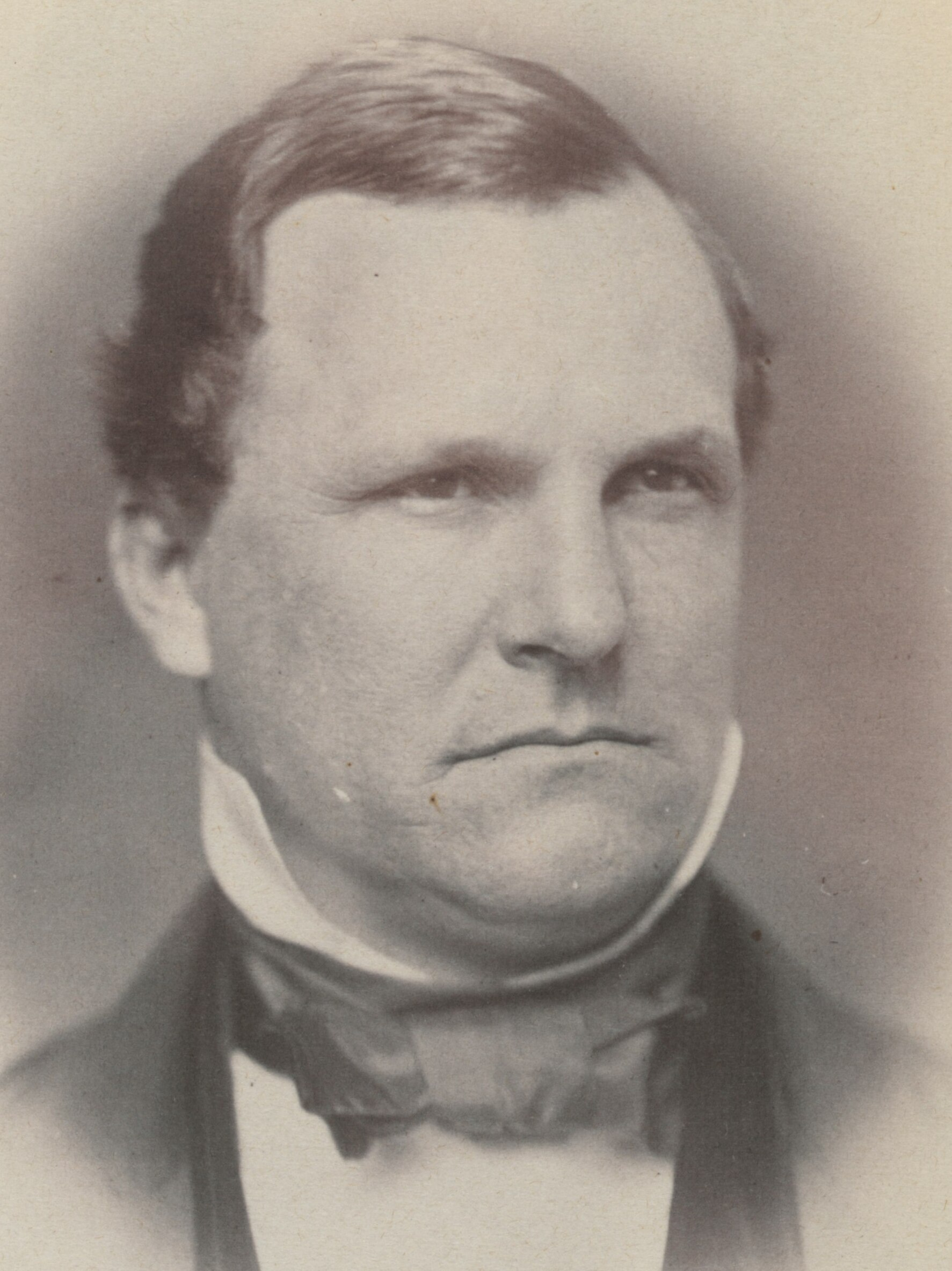

Judge on the Indiana Supreme Court
- In office January 1, 1877−January 7, 1889
- Preceded by: Samuel Hamilton Buskirk
- Succeeded by: Silas Coffey

Chairman of the House Democratic Caucus
- In office March 4, 1873 – March 3, 1875
- Speaker: James G. Blaine
- Preceded by: Self/ Samuel J. Randall (1871)
- Succeeded by: Lucius Q. C. Lamar II
- In office March 4, 1869 – March 3, 1871 Serving with Samuel J. Randall
- Speaker: James G. Blaine
- Preceded by: George S. Houston (1861)
- Succeeded by: Self

Member of the U.S. House of Representatives from Indiana's 1st district
- In office March 4, 1865 – March 3, 1875
- Preceded by: Benoni S. Fuller
- Succeeded by: John Law
- In office December 7, 1857 – March 3, 1861
- Preceded by: John Law
- Succeeded by: James Lockhart

Judge of the Indiana Third Judicial Circuit Court
- In office January 1854–October 1859

Member of the Indiana Senate
- In office 1850–1853

Member of the Indiana House of Representatives
- In office 1849–1850

Personal details
- Born: William Ellis Niblack; May 19, 1822 Dubois County, Indiana
- Died: May 7, 1893 (aged 70) Indianapolis, Indiana
- Resting place: Crown Hill Cemetery and Aboretum, Section 13, Lot 44
- Party: Democratic
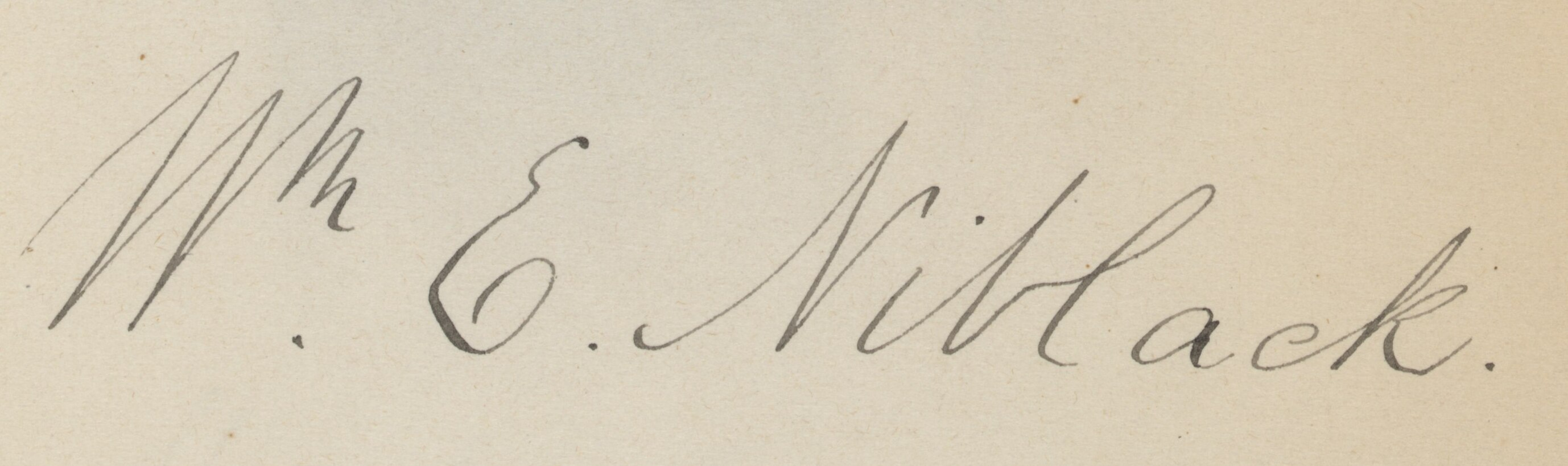
- Signature

William Ellis Niblack (May 19, 1822 – May 7, 1893) was a politician and judge who served as a U.S. representative from Indiana, a judge on the Indiana Supreme Court, and a member of both the Indiana Senate and the Indiana House of Representatives

Niblack was born in Dubois County, Indiana, a cousin of Silas Leslie Niblack. He attended the country schools and Indiana University at Bloomington. He studied law and was admitted to the bar in 1843 and commenced practice in Vincennes, Indiana.

He was Surveyor of Dubois County. He served as member of the Indiana House of Representatives in 1849 and 1850, and served in the Indiana Senate 1850−1853. He served as judge of the circuit court of the third judicial district from January 1854 until October 1859, when he resigned. He moved to Vincennes, Indiana, in 1855.

Niblack was elected as a Democrat to the Thirty-fifth Congress to fill the vacancy caused by the death of James Lockhart. He was reelected to the Thirty-sixth Congress and served from December 7, 1857, to March 3, 1861. He was not a candidate for renomination in 1860. He was again a member of the Indiana House of Representatives in 1862 and 1863, and served as delegate to the Democratic National Conventions in 1864, 1868, and 1876.

Niblack was elected to the Thirty-ninth and to the four succeeding Congresses (March 4, 1865 − March 3, 1875). He was not a candidate for renomination in 1874. He resumed the practice of law and served as judge of the Indiana Supreme Court 1877−1889. He moved to Indianapolis in 1889 and retired from public life. He died in Indianapolis, Indiana, May 7, 1893 and was interred in Crown Hill Cemetery.

U.S. House of Representatives
| Preceded by James Lockhart | Member of the U.S. House of Representatives from Indiana's 1st congressional district 1857–1861 | Succeeded by John Law |
| Preceded by John Law | Member of the U.S. House of Representatives from Indiana's 1st congressional district 1865-1875 | Succeeded by Benoni S. Fuller |
