= Bryan F. Mahan =

American politician (1856–1923)

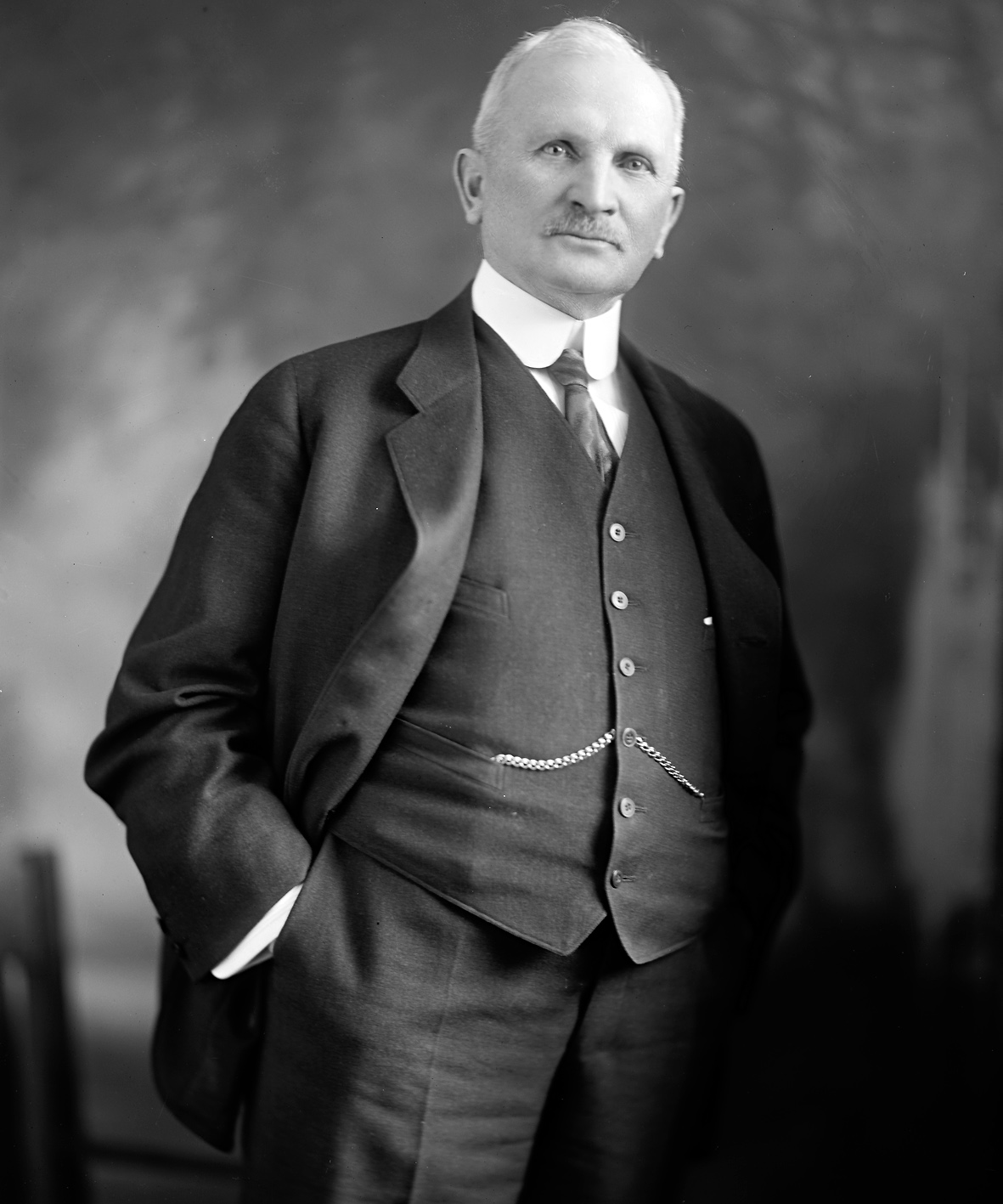
- Mahan, 1905–1923
- Born: May 1, 1856; New London, Connecticut
- Died: November 16, 1923 (aged 67); New London, Connecticut
- Resting place: St Marys Cemetery, New London; 41.361°N 72.125°W
- Occupation: Postmaster
- Known for: Twice member of US House of Representatives
- Political party: Democrat

Bryan Francis Mahan (May 1, 1856 – November 16, 1923) was an American legislator and Representative from Connecticut.

== Biography ==
Born in New London, Connecticut, Mahan attended public schools and graduated from Robert Bartlett High School where he studied to become a plumber. He later attended the Albany Law School, and graduated in 1880. He was subsequently admitted to the bar in 1881 and commenced practice in New London. Mahan served as a member of the Connecticut House of Representatives in 1882 and 1883, followed by membership on the Board of School Visitors (1885–1887) where he held the position of secretary. He was appointed as prosecuting attorney in 1891 but resigned in 1892. Mahan was one of the organizers of the City of Richmond Steamboat Co. (1893) and served as president.

Mahan's work as a public servant continued as Postmaster of New London from October 30, 1894, to December 20, 1898, mayor (1904–1906 and 1910–1913), and as a member of the Connecticut Senate from 1910 and 1911. He also served as a delegate to the Democratic National Conventions of 1904, 1908, 1912, and 1916.

Mahan was elected as a Democrat to the Sixty-third Congress (March 4, 1913 to March 3, 1915) and made an unsuccessful bid for reelection in 1914. He was again appointed as Postmaster of New London on March 23, 1915, and served until his death on November 16, 1923. He is interred at St. Mary's Cemetery.

U.S. House of Representatives
| Preceded by Thomas L. Reilly | Member of the U.S. House of Representatives from Connecticut's 2nd congressional district 1913–1915 | Succeeded by Richard P. Freeman |
