= Henry H. Starkweather =

American politician

Henry Starkweather
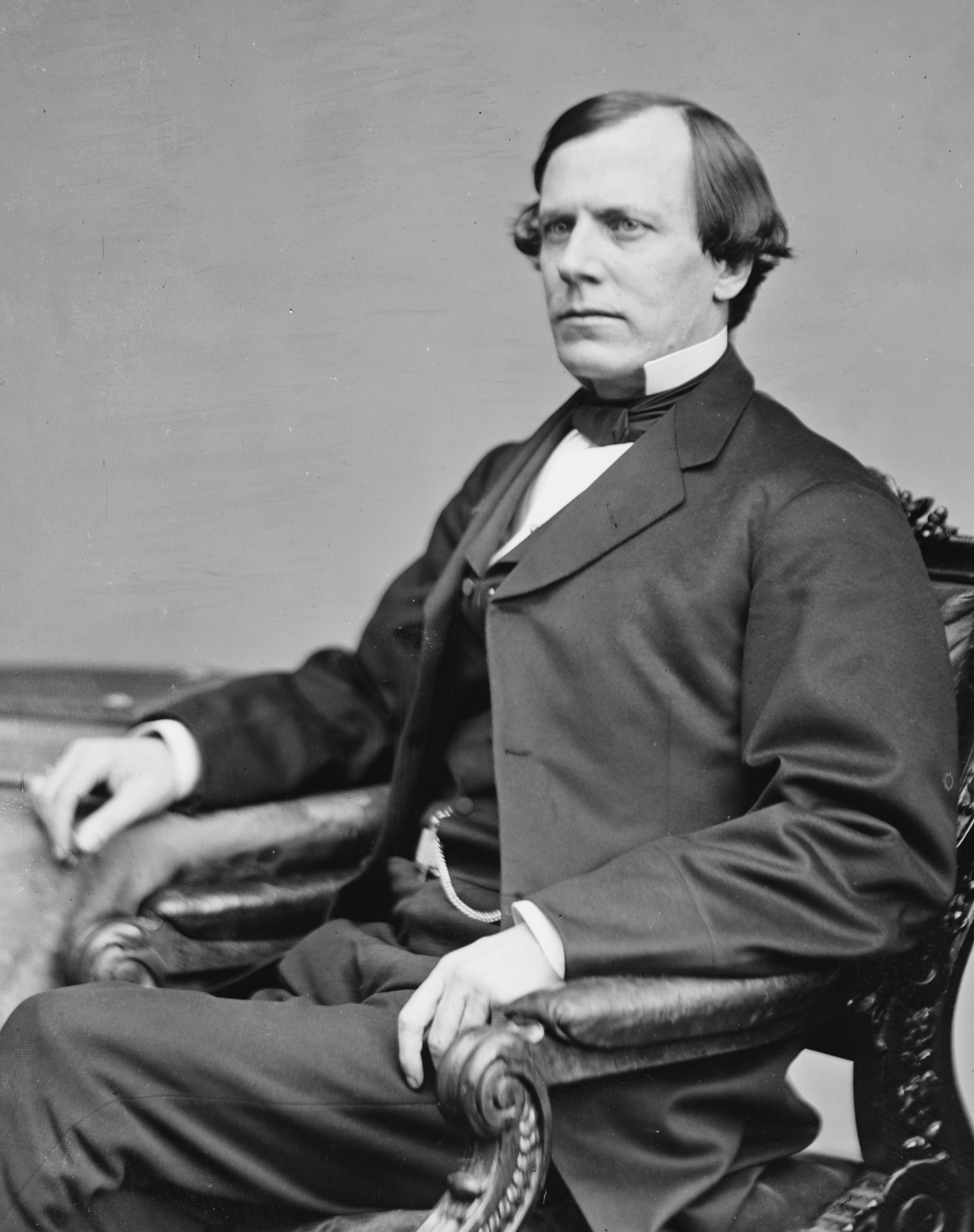

Member of the U.S. House of Representatives from Connecticut's 3rd district
- In office March 4, 1867 – January 28, 1876
- Preceded by: Augustus Brandegee
- Succeeded by: John T. Wait

Personal details
- Born: April 19, 1826 Preston, Connecticut, U.S.
- Died: January 28, 1876 (aged 49)
- Party: Republican
- Relatives: John C. Starkweather (cousin)

Henry Howard Starkweather was born in Preston, Connecticut, on April 29, 1826, and died on January 28, 1876, while serving in office as a member of the United States Congress.

== Biography ==
His parents were John Starkweather and Lydia (Button) Starkweather of Preston, Connecticut. His father served in the War of 1812 as a private in Captain Isaac Nelson's Company. Henry was a first cousin to Brig. General John Converse Starkweather.

He became a lawyer and practiced in Norwich, Connecticut. In 1856, he served in the Connecticut House of Representatives.

Starkweather became very active in the Republican Party. He was a delegate to the 1860 Republican National Convention and 1868 Republican National Convention, chairman of the state committee, and a member of the national executive committee.

He was appointed postmaster of Norwich, in 1861 by Abraham Lincoln, and was reappointed by President Andrew Johnson in 1865; he resigned in 1866. In 1867, he was elected US Representative from Connecticut's 3rd congressional district. He was re-elected in 1869, 1871, 1873, and 1875, and died in office in 1876.

== See also ==
- List of members of the United States Congress who died in office (1790–1899)

U.S. House of Representatives
| Preceded by Augustus Brandegee | Member of the U.S. House of Representatives from Connecticut's 3rd congressional district 1867-1876 | Succeeded by John T. Wait |
