= Charles Addison Russell =

American politician (1852–1902)

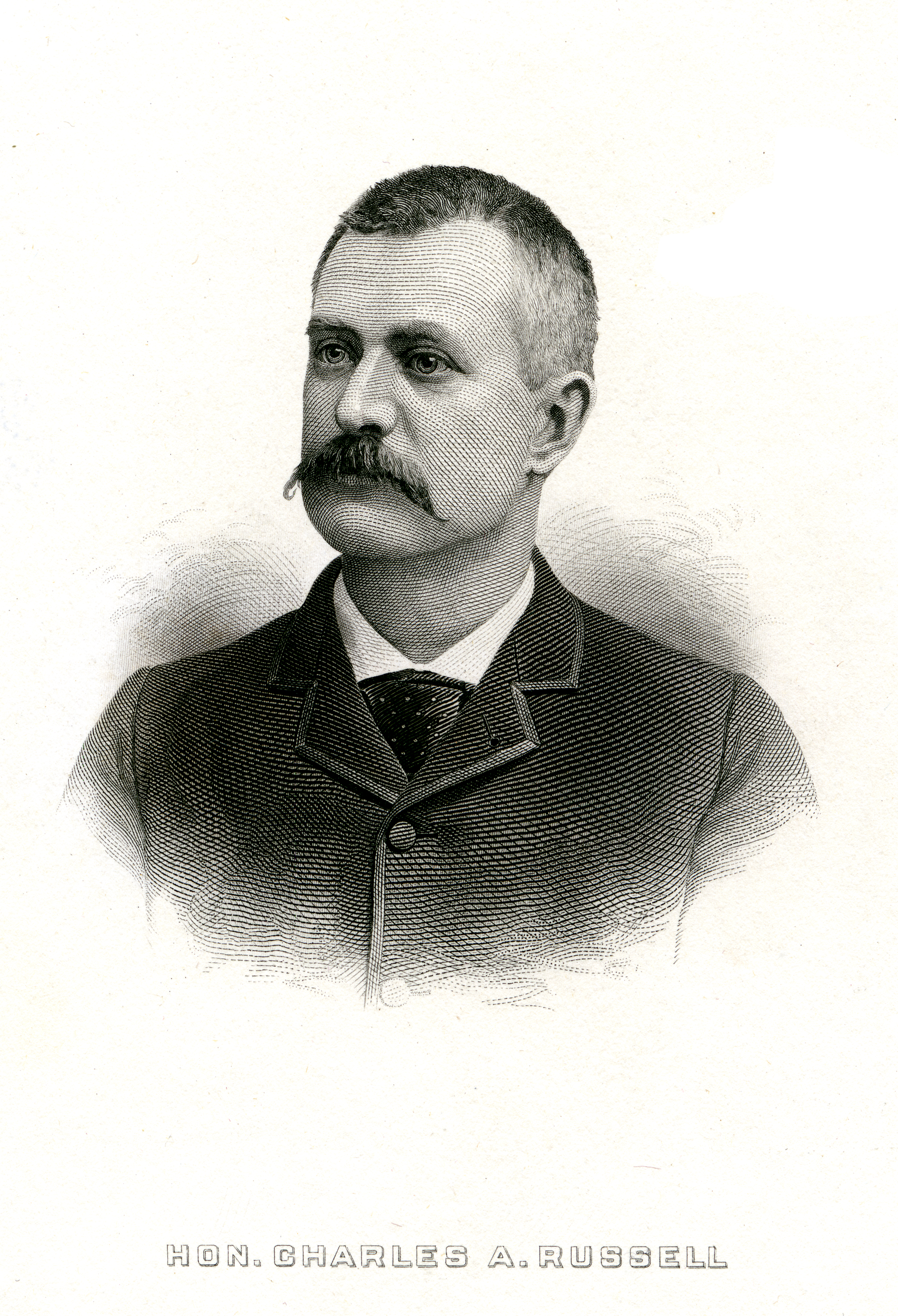

Member of the U.S. House of Representatives from Connecticut's 3rd district
- In office March 4, 1887 – October 23, 1902
- Preceded by: John T. Wait
- Succeeded by: Frank B. Brandegee

Secretary of the State of Connecticut
- In office 1885–1886
- Governor: Henry Baldwin Harrison
- Preceded by: D. Ward Northrop
- Succeeded by: Leverett M. Hubbard

Member of the Connecticut House of Representatives
- In office 1883

Personal details
- Born: March 2, 1852 Worcester
- Died: October 23, 1902 (aged 50)
- Party: Republican
- Education: Yale College

Charles Addison Russell (March 2, 1852 – October 23, 1902) was a U.S. representative from Connecticut.

== Biography ==
Born in Worcester, Massachusetts, Russell attended the public schools. He graduated from Yale College in 1873, and served as city editor of the Worcester Press from 1873 until 1879 and associate editor of the Worcester Spy in 1879 and 1880. He moved to Killingly, Connecticut, in 1879 and engaged in the manufacture of woolen products. He served as aide-de-camp on the staff of Gov. Hobart B. Bigelow in 1881. He served as member of the Connecticut House of Representatives in 1883, and as Secretary of the State of Connecticut in 1885 and 1886.

He was elected as a Republican to the Fiftieth and to the seven succeeding Congresses and served from March 4, 1887, until his death. He served as chairman of the Committee on Expenditures in the Department of War (Fifty-seventh Congress). He had been renominated as the Republican candidate for reelection in 1902. He died in Killingly, Connecticut, on October 23, 1902. He was interred in the High Street Cemetery, Dayville, Killingly, Connecticut.

== See also ==
- List of members of the United States Congress who died in office (1900–1949)

U.S. House of Representatives
Preceded by John T. Wait	Member of the U.S. House of Representatives from Connecticut's 3rd congressional district 1887–1902	Succeeded by Frank B. Brandegee
