= Lyman Law =

American politician (1770-1842)

Personal details
- Born: August 19, 1770 New London, Connecticut, British America
- Died: February 3, 1842 (aged 71) New London, Connecticut, U.S.
- Resting place: Cedar Grove Cemetery
- Spouse: Elizabeth Learned
- Relations: Jonathan Law (grandfather)
- Children: John and William
- Parent: Richard Law (father)
- Education: Yale College
- Occupation: Politician; lawyer

Lyman Law (August 19, 1770 – February 3, 1842), son of Richard Law and father of John Law and William Henry Law, was a United States representative from Connecticut.

== Early life ==
Lyman Law was born on August 19, 1770, in New London, Connecticut, to Richard Law. His grandfather was Jonathan Law. He pursued classical studies and was graduated from Yale College in 1791. He studied law and was admitted to the bar in 1793 and commenced practice in New London.

== Career ==
Law was a member of the Connecticut State House of Representatives in 1801, 1802, 1806, 1809, 1810, 1819, and 1826, and served as speaker in 1806, 1809, and 1810. He was elected as a Federalist to the Twelfth, Thirteenth, and Fourteenth Congresses (March 4, 1811 – March 3, 1817). He then returned to practicing law. He was the sixth Grand Master of the Masonic Grand Lodge of Connecticut, serving from 1821 to 1822.

== Personal life ==
Law married Elizabeth Learned, daughter of Amasa Learned. His son John Law served as United States Representative from Indiana and his son William Henry Law was a member of the Connecticut General Assembly.

Law died in New London on February 3, 1842, and was originally buried in the "Second Burial Ground" and was reburied in Cedar Grove Cemetery in 1851.

U.S. House of Representatives
Preceded by Ebenezer Huntington	Member of the U.S. House of Representatives from Connecticut's at-large congressional district 1811-1817	Succeeded by Ebenezer Huntington
