= Griffin Alexander Stedman =

American Civil War soldier

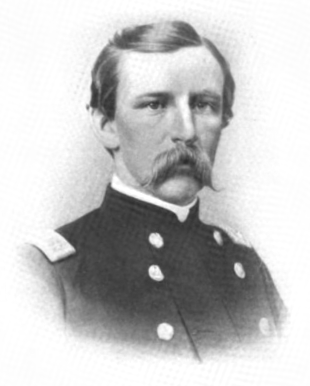

Personal details
- Born: January 6, 1838 Hartford, Connecticut
- Died: August 6, 1864 (aged 26) Petersburg, Virginia
- Resting place: Cedar Hill Cemetery
- Education: Hartford High School; Trinity College
- Occupation: Lawyer, military officer

Griffin Alexander Stedman Jr. (January 6, 1838 – August 6, 1864) was a Colonel in the Union Army during the American Civil War and served in several key battles during the war. He was killed in action during the Siege of Petersburg and brevetted brigadier general.

== Early life and education ==
Stedman was born in Hartford, Connecticut on January 6, 1838, to Griffin Alexander and Mary (Shields) Stedman. He graduated from Hartford High School and from Trinity College in Hartford, Connecticut in 1859. After graduation, he practiced law in Philadelphia.

== Civil War ==
When the Civil War began he joined the Washington Greys in Philadelphia. He returned to Hartford and joined the First Regiment Colt's Revolving Rifles formed by gunmaker Samuel Colt. The First Regiment reformed and became the 5th Connecticut Infantry Regiment with Stedman commissioned as captain of company I. Stedman and the 5th Regiment were mustered into service on July 22, 1861. On November 27, 1861, he was commissioned major in the 11th Connecticut Infantry Regiment.

On June 11, 1862, he was promoted to lieutenant colonel and returned with the regiment to the Army of the Potomac and fought in the Battle of Antietam. At Antietam, he had command of the right wing of the regiment in the attack on the stone bridge and was wounded in the leg. He became Colonel on September 25, 1862, and was in command during the Battle of Fredericksburg.

In January 1864, the regiment re-enlisted and on its return to the front was assigned to the Eighteenth Corps. On May 9, his troops were engaged at the Battle of Swift Creek and on May 16 at the Battle of Drewery's Bluff where he lost almost 200 men. In late May, he commanded the brigade and fought at Cold Harbor.

He was mortally wounded by a bullet in his side during the Siege of Petersburg on August 5, 1864, and died on August 6, 1864. Major General Edward Ord attempted to have Stedman promoted to brevet brigadier general before his death but instead it was awarded posthumously.

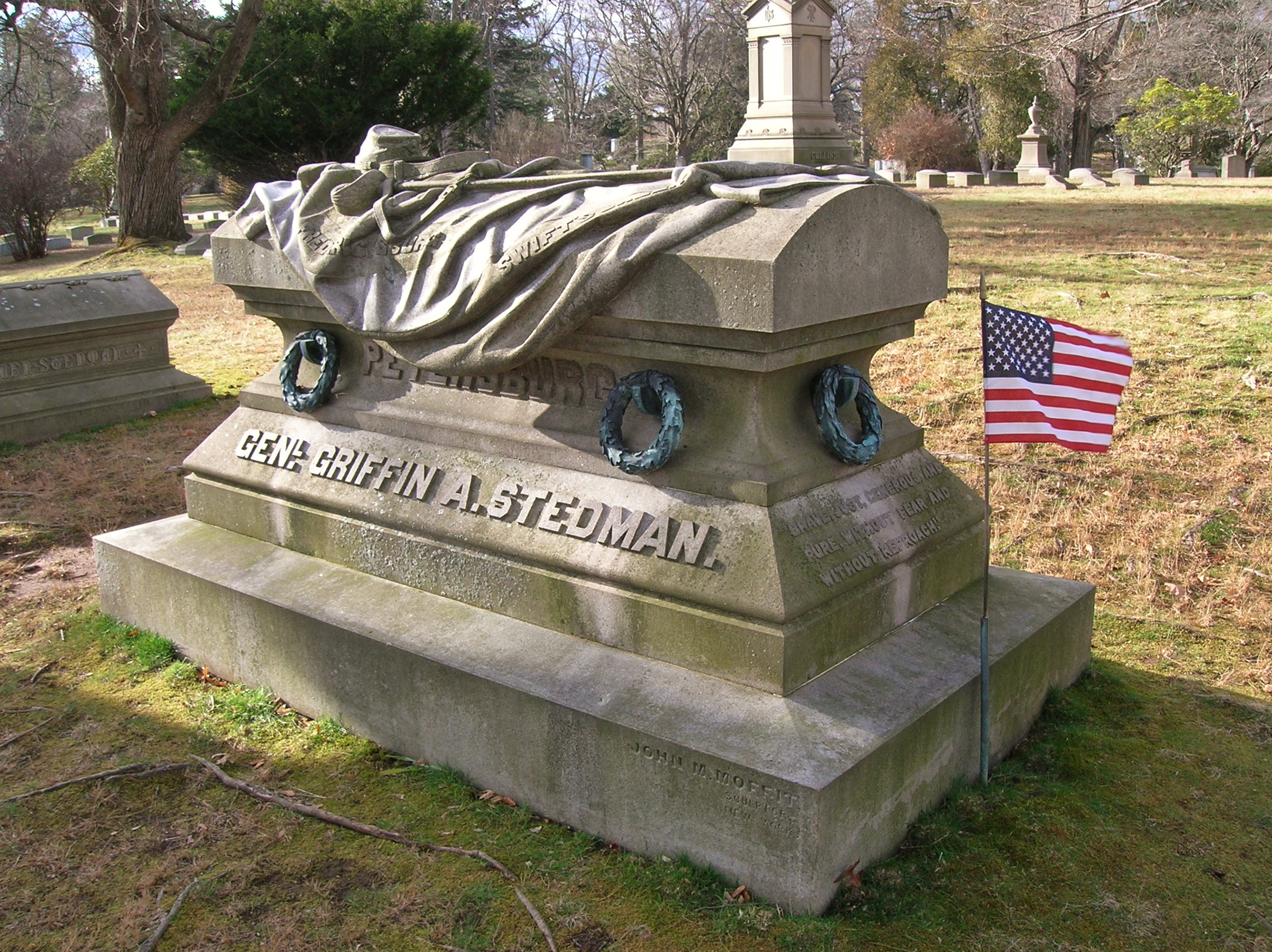
General Griffin A. Stedman sarcophagus at Cedar Hill Cemetery

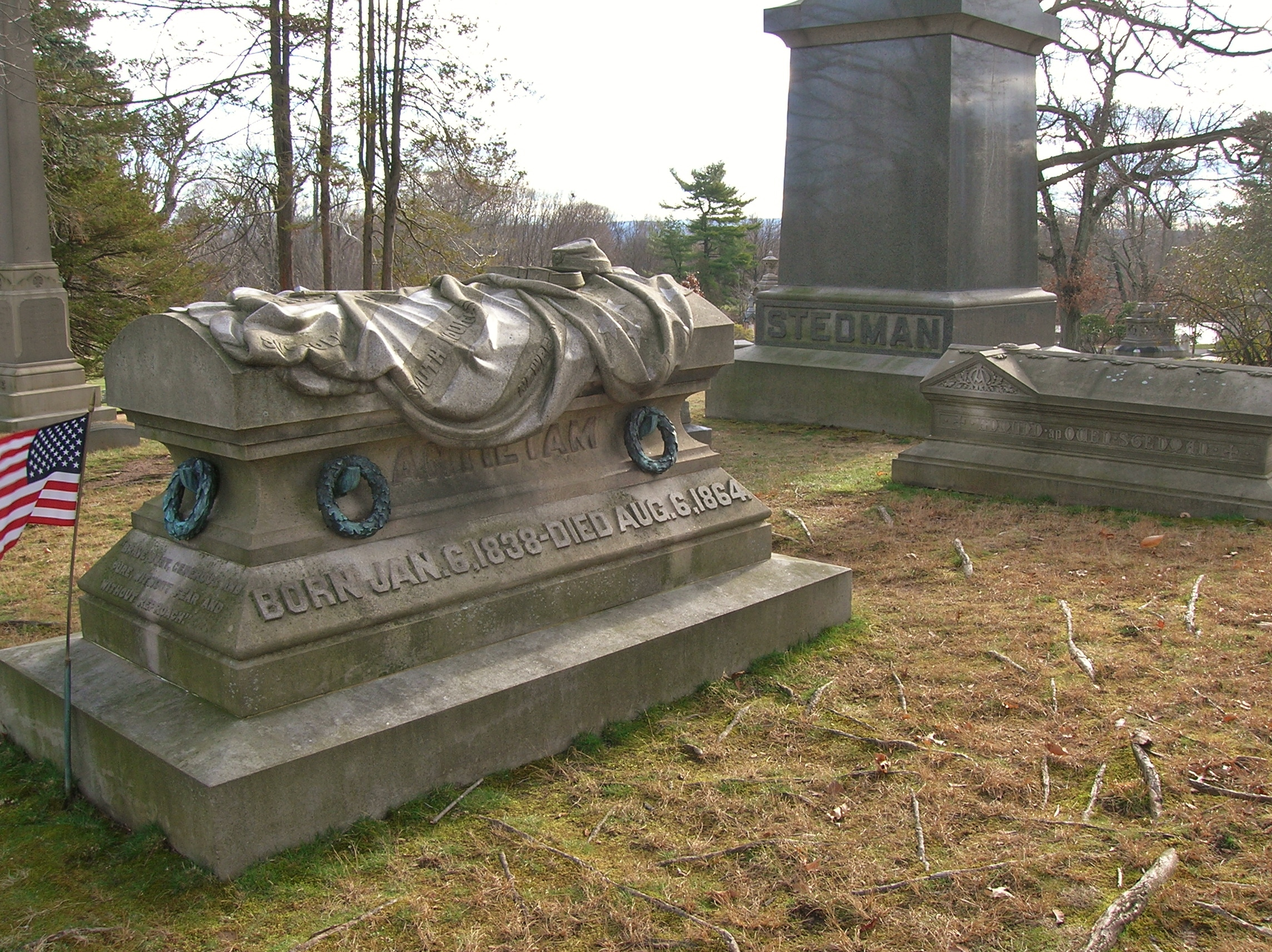
Stedman sarcophagus with obelisk in background

He was originally interred in Cedar Grove Cemetery in New London, Connecticut and was re-interred in the family plot in Cedar Hill Cemetery in Hartford, Connecticut on May 20, 1875. The sarcophagus is carved with his ornamental sword, cap and belt, inscribed with the battles he fought in and the words "Brave, just, generous and pure, without fear and reproach".

== Legacy ==
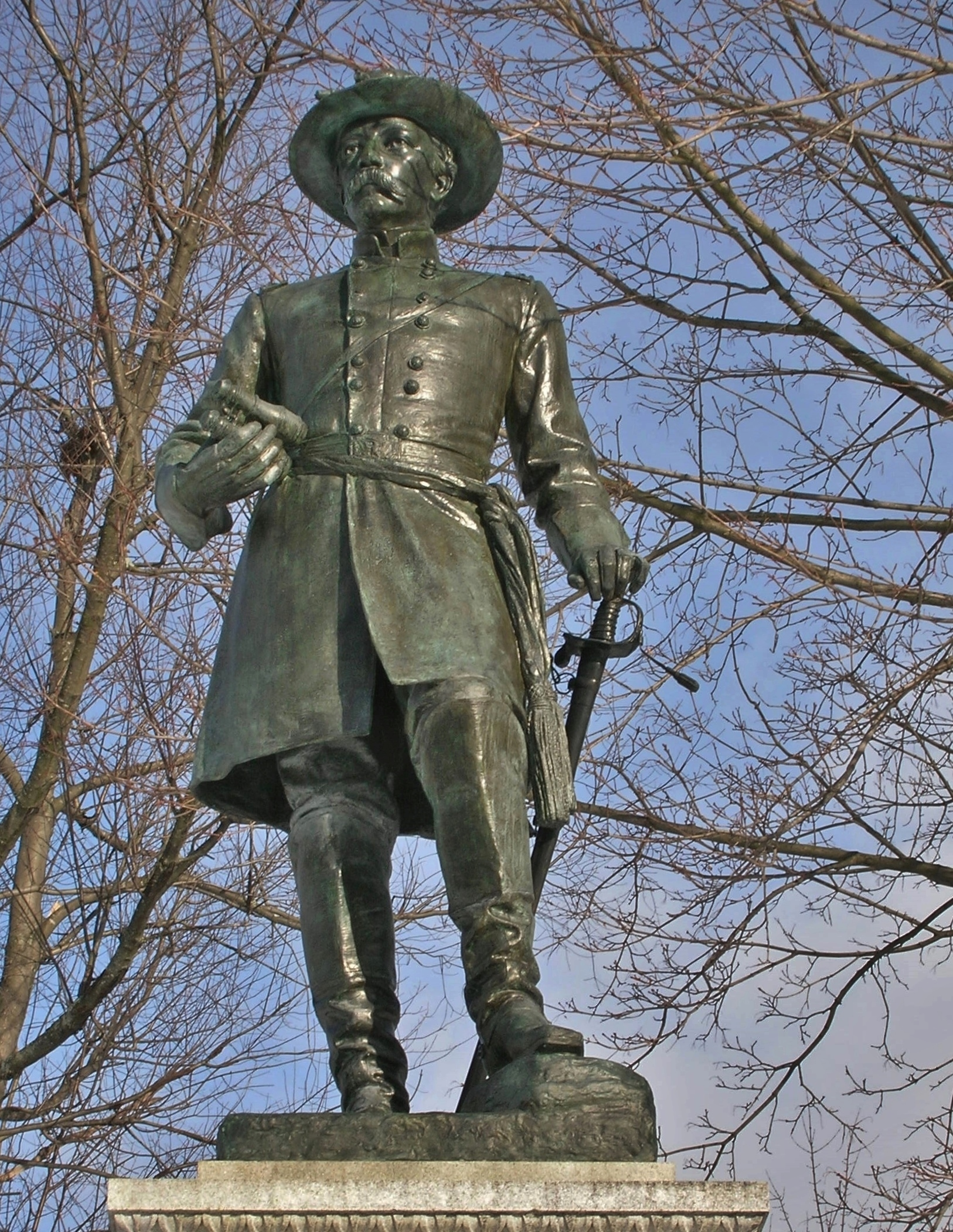
Griffin A. Stedman Monument in the Barry Square neighborhood of Hartford

Fort Stedman in Petersburg, Virginia was named in his honor.

A bronze statue in his likeness in the Barry Square neighborhood of Hartford, Connecticut was designed by Frederick Moynihan and cast at the Gorham Manufacturing Company. The neighborhood was the former location of Camp-Field, which was the location of muster for Hartford troops training for the Civil War. After the war, the 22nd and 25th Regiments established the Camp-Field Monument Association with the intent to erect a monument to dedicate the site. The association wanted to depict a typical Connecticut volunteer with a military history associated with the site. The association selected Stedman as the subject of the statue.

Stedman Street in Hartford is named after him and the General Griffin A. Stedman Jr. Memorial Scholarship at Trinity was instituted in his honor.
