= Joseph Talcott =

26th Deputy Governor Connecticut
- In office 1724–1741
- Preceded by: Nathan Gold
- Succeeded by: Jonathan Law

Personal details
- Born: November 16, 1669 Hartford, Connecticut
- Died: October 11, 1741 (aged 71) Hartford, Connecticut
- Spouse: Abigail Clark Talcott
- Children: John Talcott Joseph Talcott

Major Joseph Talcott (November 16, 1669 – October 11, 1741) was an American politician, militia officer, and judge who served as the governor of Connecticut from 1724 to 1741.

== Biography ==
Talcott was born in Hartford, Connecticut, the son of Lieutenant-Colonel John and Helena Wakeman Talcott. He married Abigail Clark in 1693 and the couple had three sons. Abigail died in 1704. His second wife was Eunice Howell with whom he had five more children.

== Career ==
Descended from one of Connecticut's founding settlers, Talcott was appointed an assistant (member of the governor's council) in 1711. He held a number of city and state offices; justice of the peace in 1705, and beginning in 1710, he was a major in the First Regiment of the Colony of Connecticut. His position of major continued to 1723. He was a member of the committee to lay out the town of Coventry in 1711. He owned property in several Connecticut towns. In May 1714, he was appointed as a judge of the Hartford County Court and he became Judge of the Superior Court of Hartford in May 1721.

In 1723, Talcott was elected Deputy Governor upon the death of Nathan Gold; then following the sudden death of Gurdon Saltonstall, he was made Governor. He was the first Connecticut Governor to be born in the state. He was re-elected annually until his death, for a total of seventeen years and five months in office. This time was only surpassed by Gov. John Winthrop's eighteen years in office.

== Death and legacy ==
Talcott died on October 11, 1741. He is interred in the Ancient Burying Ground in Hartford. Talcott Street in Hartford bears his name.

Political offices
Preceded by Gurdon Saltonstall	Governor of the Connecticut Colony; 1724–1741	Succeeded by Jonathan Law
