= Richard P. Freeman =

American politician (1869–1944)

Richard Freeman
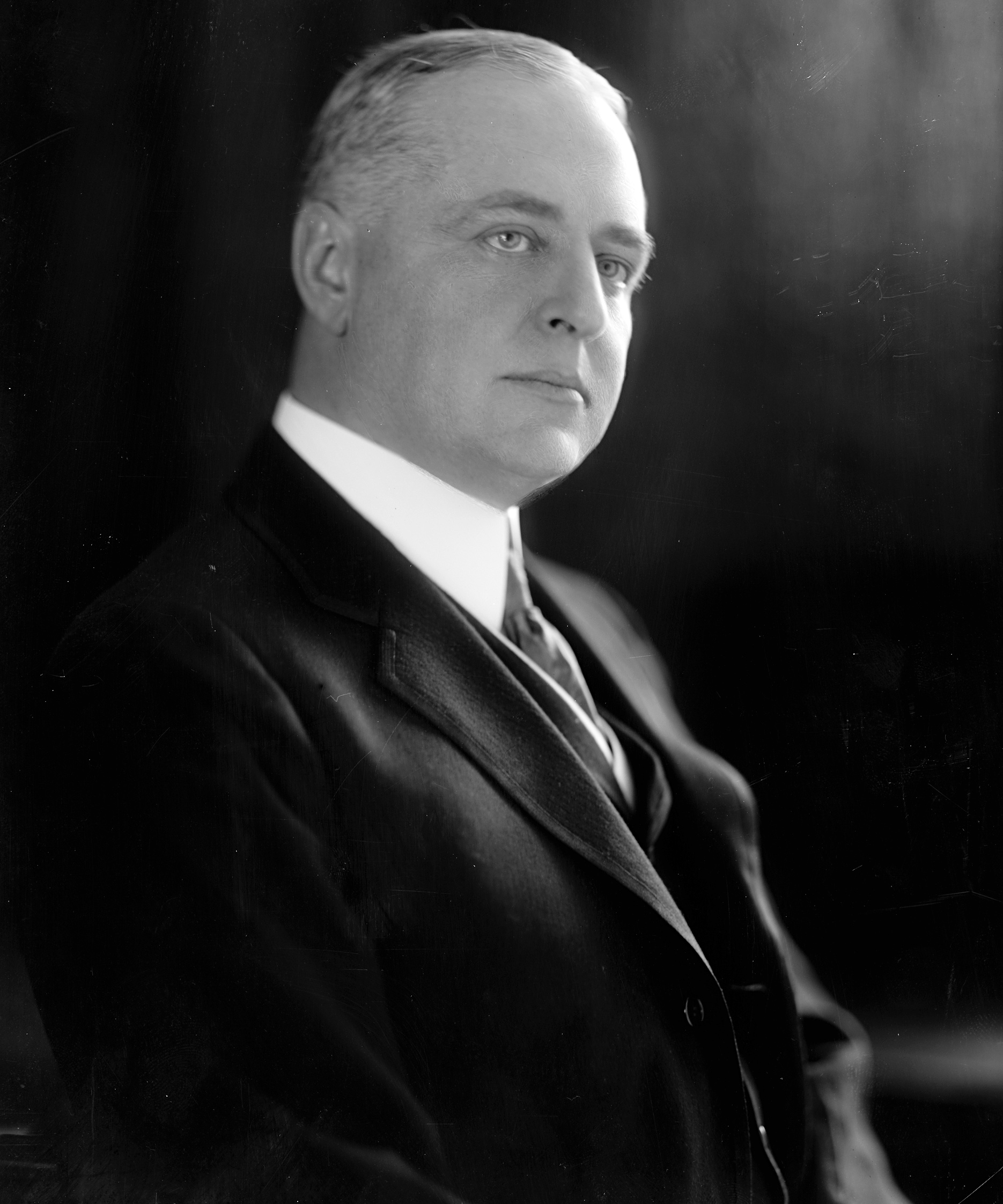

Member of the U.S. House of Representatives from Connecticut's 2nd district
- In office March 4, 1915 – March 3, 1933
- Preceded by: Bryan F. Mahan
- Succeeded by: William L. Higgins

Personal details
- Born: April 24, 1869 New London, Connecticut, U.S.
- Died: July 8, 1944 (aged 75) Newington, Connecticut, U.S
- Party: Republican

Richard Patrick Freeman (April 24, 1869 – July 8, 1944) was a U.S. representative from Connecticut.

== Biography ==
Born in New London, Connecticut, Freeman attended the public schools. He was graduated from Bulkeley High School at New London in 1887, from Noble and Greenough's Preparatory School, Boston, Massachusetts, in 1888, from Harvard University in 1891, and from the law department of Yale University in 1894. He was admitted to the bar in 1894 and commenced practice in New London, Connecticut.

He served as special agent for the Department of the Interior in the States of Oregon and Washington in 1896–1898. During the war with Spain served as regimental sergeant major in the Third Regiment, Connecticut Volunteer Infantry, and afterward became major and judge advocate of the Connecticut National Guard. He served as prosecuting attorney of the city of New London 1898–1901. He was an unsuccessful candidate for the Republican nomination to Congress in 1912.

Freeman was elected as a Republican to the Sixty-fourth and to the eight succeeding Congresses (March 4, 1915 – March 3, 1933). He was an unsuccessful candidate for renomination in 1932. He resumed the practice of law in New London, Connecticut. He died in Newington, Connecticut, July 8, 1944. He was interred in Cedar Grove Cemetery, New London, Connecticut.

U.S. House of Representatives
Preceded by Bryan F. Mahan	Member of the U.S. House of Representatives from Connecticut's 2nd congressional district 1915–1933	Succeeded by William L. Higgins
