= 11th Connecticut Infantry Regiment =

- Active: October 24, 1861 - December 21, 1865
- Country: United States
- Allegiance: Union
- Branch: United States Army
- Type: Infantry
- Engagements: Battle of Roanoke Island; Battle of New Bern; Battle of South Mountain; Battle of Antietam; Battle of Fredericksburg; Battle of Drewry's Bluff; Battle of Cold Harbor; Siege of Petersburg; Appomattox Campaign

Commanders
- Colonel: Henry Walter Kingsbury
- Lieutenant Colonel: Charles Mathewson
- Major: Griffin Alexander Stedman

The 11th Connecticut Infantry Regiment was an infantry regiment that served in the Union Army during the American Civil War.

== Service ==
The 11th Connecticut Infantry Regiment was organized at Hartford, Connecticut, beginning October 24, 1861, and mustered in for a three-year enlistment on November 14, 1861.

The regiment was attached to Williams' Brigade, Burnside's Expeditionary Corps, to April 1862. 2nd Brigade, 2nd Division, Department of North Carolina, to July 1862. 2nd Brigade, 3rd Division, IX Corps, Army of the Potomac, to April 1863. 2nd Brigade, 2nd Division, VII Corps, Department of Virginia, to July 1863. 2nd Brigade, Getty's Division, Portsmouth, Virginia, Department of Virginia and North Carolina, to October 1863. Yorktown, Virginia, Department of Virginia and North Carolina, to April 1864. 2nd Brigade, 2nd Division, XVIII Corps, Department of Virginia and North Carolina, to October 1864. Provisional Division, Army of the James, to December 1864. 1st Brigade, 3rd Division, XXIV Corps, Department of Virginia, to July 1865. 1st Independent Brigade, XXIV Corps to August 1865. Department of Virginia to December 1865.

The 11th Connecticut Infantry mustered out of service December 21, 1865.

== Detailed service ==
Left Connecticut for Annapolis, Maryland, December 16, and duty there until January 6, 1862. Burnside's expedition to Hatteras Inlet and Roanoke Island, North Carolina, January 7–February 8, 1862. Battle of Roanoke Island February 8. At Roanoke Island until March 11. Moved to New Bern March 11–13. Battle of New Bern March 14. Duty at Newberne until July. Moved to Morehead City July 2, then to Newport News, Virginia, July 3–5. Duty there until August 1. Moved to Fredericksburg August 1–6, and duty there until August 31. Moved to Brooks' Station, then to Washington, D.C., August 31–September 3. Maryland Campaign September–October. Battle of South Mountain September 14. Battle of Antietam September 16–17. Duty at Pleasant Valley, Maryland, until October 27. Movement to Falmouth, Virginia, October 27 – November 19. Battle of Fredericksburg, December 12–15. Burnside's 2nd Campaign, "Mud March," January 20–24, 1863. Moved to Newport News, Virginia, February 6–9, then to Suffolk March 13. Siege of Suffolk April 12 – May 4. Edenton Road April 24. Providence Church Road and Nansemond River May 3. Siege of Suffolk raised May 4. Reconnaissance to the Chickahominy June 9–16. Dix's Peninsula Campaign June 24 – July 7. Expedition from White House to South Anna River July 1–7. Moved to Portsmouth, Virginia, and duty there until October. Moved to Gloucester Point October 1 and duty there until April 1864. Butler's operations on south side of the James River and against Petersburg and Richmond May 4–28. Occupation of Bermuda Hundred, Va., May 5. Port Walthal Junction, Chester Station, May 7. Swift Creek or Arrowfield Church May 9–10. Operations against Fort Darling May 12–16. Battle of Drewry's Bluff May 12–16. On Bermuda Hundred front May 17–27. Moved to White House, then to Cold Harbor May 27–31. Battles about Cold Harbor June 1–12. Before Petersburg June 15–18. Siege operations against Petersburg and Richmond June 16, 1864, to April 2, 1865. Mine explosion Petersburg July 30, 1864 (reserve). On Bermuda Hundred front August 25 to December, and on north side of the James River before Richmond until April 1865. Occupation of Richmond April 3. Duty at Richmond and Lynchburg, Virginia, until December.

== Casualties ==
The regiment lost a total of 325 men during service; 8 officers and 140 enlisted men killed or mortally wounded, 1 officer and 176 enlisted men died of disease.

== Commanders ==
- Colonel Henry Walter Kingsbury - mortally wounded in action at the Battle of Antietam
- Colonel Griffin Alexander Stedman - mortally wounded in action at Petersburg, August 5, 1864
- Major John Ward - commanded the regiment at the Battle of Antietam after Col Kingsbury was wounded
- Major Charles Warren - commanded during the Appomattox Campaign

== Notable members ==
- Lieutenant George Whitefield Davis, regimental quartermaster - 4th Military Governor of Puerto Rico, 1899–1900 and 1st Military Governor of Panama Canal Zone, 1904–1905

== See also ==
- Connecticut in the American Civil War
- List of Connecticut Civil War units
