= William Henry Law =

American politician (1803-1881)

Member of the Connecticut General Assembly
- In office 1832–1833

Personal details
- Born: September 11, 1803 New London, Connecticut, U.S.
- Died: March 27, 1881 (aged 77) New Haven, Connecticut, U.S.
- Resting place: New London, Connecticut, U.S.
- Spouse(s): Mary Lee (m. 1829; died 1839) Harriet B. Mills (m. 1855)
- Relations: John Law (brother); Amasa Learned (grandfather); Richard Law (grandfather); Jonathan Law (great-grandfather); William J. Mills (stepson)
- Children: 2
- Parent: Lyman Law (father)
- Education: Yale College
- Occupation: Politician; lawyer

William Henry Law (September 11, 1803 – March 27, 1881) was an American politician from Connecticut.

== Early life ==
William Henry Law was born on September 11, 1803, in New London, Connecticut, as the third son of Elizabeth (née Learned) and Lyman Law. His paternal grandfather was Richard Law and his great-grandfather was Jonathan Law. His maternal grandfather was Amasa Learned. His brother was John Law. He graduated from Yale College in 1822. He studied law with his father in New London and was admitted to the bar in 1826.

== Career ==
Law practiced law in New London until 1830. He stopped practicing law and moved to Norwich in 1832.

Law served in the Connecticut General Assembly, representing Norwich, in 1832. In 1868, he moved to New Haven.

== Personal life ==
Law married Mary Lee of Norwich in February 1829. They had one daughter, Mrs. Walden. His wife died in 1839. He married Mrs. Harriet B. Mills of Mississippi in October 1855. They had one son, William H. He had two stepsons, John B. Mills and William J. Mills.

Law died on March 27, 1881, in New Haven. He was buried in New London.
