= Jonathan Law =

American lawyer, judge, and politician

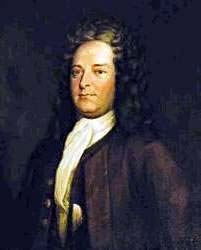

Deputy Governor
- In office 1741–1750
- Preceded by: Joseph Talcott
- Succeeded by: Roger Wolcott

Personal details
- Born: August 6, 1674 Milford, Connecticut
- Died: November 6, 1750 (aged 76)
- Spouses: Anne Eliot Law; Abigail Arnold Law; Abigail Andrew Law; Sarah Burr Law; Eunice (Hall) Andrew Law Pitkin
- Children: Jonathan Law; Eunice (Andrew) Law; Ann Law Hall; Abigail Arnold Law; Sarah Law; Mary Law Brown; Richard Law
- Relatives: Lyman Law (grandson); William Henry Law (great-grandson); John Law (great-grandson)
- Education: Harvard College

Jonathan Law (August 6, 1674 – November 6, 1750) was an American lawyer, judge, and politician who served as the governor of Connecticut from 1741 to 1750.

== Biography ==
Law was born in Milford in what was then the Connecticut Colony to Jonathan and Sarah (Clark) Law. He studied law at Harvard College. Known as talented, amiable, and even-tempered, he graduated in 1695. He married five times and had a number of children, seven of whom were sons. On December 20, 1698, he married Anne Eliot; on February 14, 1704, Abigail Arnold; on August 1, 1706, Abigail Andrew; in 1725, widow Sarah Burr; and in 1730, Eunice (Hall) Andrew. Some of his children and grandchildren went on to serve in Congress and other national political offices. His daughter Anne was the aunt of Founding Father Lyman Hall. One of his sons was Richard. His grandson was Lyman Law and his great-grandsons were William Henry Law and John Law.

== Career ==
In 1698, Law established a law office in Milford. Initially serving as a justice of the peace and of the quorum for New Haven County in May 1709, he was then named Judge of the County Court of New Haven County and Assistant Judge of the Connecticut Superior Court.

Elected Deputy to the Connecticut General Assembly in 1706, Law served several terms until 1717. He was then chosen as an assistant and served as such, with the exception of one year, until 1724. In October 1724, he became Deputy Governor and, in May 1725, Chief Judge of the Superior Court, holding these two offices at the same time, which was possible under the government of that era.

By the time that Law came to the governorship in October 1741, following the death of Governor Joseph Talcott, Law was 67 years old and had been active in the colonial government for 35 years. He had an extensive farm and was one of the first to plant mulberry trees and introduce raising silk worms to Connecticut. He advocated for the industry and advertised by wearing a coat and stockings made of Connecticut silk at a public appearance in 1747.

== Death and legacy ==
Law died while in office on November 6, 1750, in Milford, Connecticut, and is interred at Milford Cemetery. Jonathan Law High School in Milford was named in his honor.

Political offices
Preceded by Joseph Talcott	Governor of the Connecticut Colony; 1741–1750	Succeeded by Roger Wolcott
