= George W. Corliss =

George Wilhelm Corliss
- Born: c. 1834; Connecticut
- Died: May 15, 1903; New York
- Burial place: Maple Grove Cemetery, New York
- Military career
- Allegiance: United States of America
- Branch: United States Army
- Rank: Captain
- Unit: 5th Regiment, Connecticut Volunteer Infantry - Company C
- Conflicts: Battle of Cedar Mountain
- Awards: Medal of Honor

Captain George Wilhelm Corliss (c. 1834 – May 15, 1903) was an American soldier who fought in the American Civil War. Corliss received the country's highest award for bravery during combat, the Medal of Honor, for his action during the Battle of Cedar Mountain in Virginia on 9 August 1862. He was honored with the award on 10 September 1897.

== Biography ==
Corliss was born in Connecticut in about 1834 (need reference). He enlisted into the 5th Connecticut Infantry at New Haven in Connecticut. During his act of bravery for which he earned a Medal of Honor, Corliss was injured in his right leg and was therefore captured by Confederates. He was held at Libby Prison until he was exchanged around January 1863. He soon resigned from active service due to his disability but rejoined as a commissioned 1st lieutenant and regimental adjutant with the 3rd Veterans Reserve Corps. He was brevetted major in 1865.

Corliss was married to Catherine Bounce, and they resided in Mississippi, where he was assistant sub-commissioner of the District of Vicksburg within the Freedmen's Bureau. After leaving this post in 1869, he resided in New Haven, Connecticut, and then Manhattan, where he was an insurance broker. He was married again to Mary Harriet Munson after the death of his first wife. His second marriage produced two children.

Corliss died on 15 May 1903 and his remains are interred at the Maple Grove Cemetery in New York.

== Medal of Honor citation ==
Seized a fallen flag of the regiment, the color bearer having been killed, carried it forward in the face of a severe fire, and though himself shot down and permanently disabled, planted the staff in the earth and kept the flag flying.

== See also ==
- List of American Civil War Medal of Honor recipients: A–F
