= Amasa Learned =

American politician (1750–1825)

Member of the U.S. House of Representatives from Connecticut's at-large district
- In office March 4, 1791 – March 3, 1795
- Preceded by: Roger Sherman
- Succeeded by: Chauncey Goodrich

Personal details
- Born: November 15, 1750 Killingly, Connecticut Colony, British America
- Died: May 4, 1825 (aged 74) New London, Connecticut, U.S.
- Party: Pro-Administration Party
- Spouse: Grace Hallam Learned
- Relations: John Law (grandson); William Henry Law (grandson)
- Children: 4
- Education: Yale College
- Occupation: Preacher, Lawyer, Politician

Amasa Learned (November 15, 1750 – May 4, 1825) was an American preacher, lawyer, and politician from New London, Connecticut. He served in the state's House of Representatives and represented Connecticut in the U.S. House from 1791 until 1795.

== Early life and career ==
Learned was born in Killingly in the Connecticut Colony, the son of Deacon Ebenezer Learned and Keziah (Leavens) Learned. He was prepared for college by a private tutor and graduated from Yale College in 1772. Learned taught in the Union School in New London. He studied theology, received a license from the Windham Association in October 1773, and preached for a short time before entering politics.

While living in Killingly, Learned began the study of law in 1778. He was elected a member of the Connecticut House of Representatives in 1779. After moving to New London, he served again in the Connecticut House of Representatives from 1785 to 1791. He was a member of the convention which ratified the Constitution of the United States in 1788.

Learned was elected to the upper house of assistants in 1791, and simultaneously served as a judge of the Connecticut Supreme Court of Errors from 1791 to 1792. He was elected as a Pro-Administration candidate to the Second and Third Congresses, serving from March 4, 1791, to March 3, 1795; he was also the runner-up for another of Connecticut's at-large congressional districts in a December 1790 special election, losing to Jeremiah Wadsworth. He engaged in land speculations while serving in Congress.

After serving in Congress, he was a delegate to the state constitutional convention in 1818.

== Personal life ==
Learned married Grace Hallam in 1773. They had four children. His grandsons were Connecticut politician William Henry Law and U.S. Representative from Indiana John Law.

Learned died in New London on May 4, 1825.

U.S. House of Representatives
| Preceded by Roger Sherman | Member of the U.S. House of Representatives from Connecticut's at-large congressional district 1791–1795 | Succeeded by Chauncey Goodrich |
