= List of former United States representatives (P) =

This is a complete list of former United States representatives whose last names begin with the letter P.

== Number of years and terms the member has served ==
The number of years the representative/delegate has served in Congress indicates the number of terms the representative/delegate has. Note the representative/delegate can also serve non-consecutive terms if the representative/delegate loses election and wins re-election to the House.

- 2 years - 1 or 2 terms
- 4 years - 2 or 3 terms
- 6 years - 3 or 4 terms
- 8 years - 4 or 5 terms
- 10 years - 5 or 6 terms
- 12 years - 6 or 7 terms
- 14 years - 7 or 8 terms
- 16 years - 8 or 9 terms
- 18 years - 9 or 10 terms
- 20 years - 10 or 11 terms
- 22 years - 11 or 12 terms
- 24 years - 12 or 13 terms
- 26 years - 13 or 14 terms
- 28 years - 14 or 15 terms
- 30 years - 15 or 16 terms
- 32 years - 16 or 17 terms
- 34 years - 17 or 18 terms
- 36 years - 18 or 19 terms
- 38 years - 19 or 20 terms
- 40 years - 20 or 21 terms
- 42 years - 21 or 22 terms
- 44 years - 22 or 23 terms
- 46 years - 23 or 24 terms
- 48 years - 24 or 25 terms
- 50 years - 25 or 26 terms
- 52 years - 26 or 27 terms
- 54 years - 27 or 28 terms
- 56 years - 28 or 29 terms
- 58 years - 29 or 30 terms

Name	Term	State/ Territory	Party	Lifespan
Stephen Pace	1937–1951	Georgia	Democratic	1891–1970
Romualdo Pacheco	1877–1878; 1879–1883	California	Republican	1831–1899
Jasper Packard	1869–1875	Indiana	Republican	1832–1899
Ron Packard	1983–2001	California	Republican	1931–present
Asa Packer	1853–1857	Pennsylvania	Democratic	1805–1879
Horace Billings Packer	1897–1901	Pennsylvania	Republican	1851–1940
John Black Packer	1869–1877	Pennsylvania	Republican	1824–1891
George A. Paddock	1941–1943	Illinois	Republican	1885–1964
Lemuel P. Padgett	1901–1922	Tennessee	Democratic	1855–1922
Bolívar Pagán	1939–1945	Puerto Rico	Republican	1897–1961
Charles H. Page	1887; 1891–1893; 1893–1895	Rhode Island	Democratic	1843–1912
Henry Page	1891–1892	Maryland	Democratic	1841–1913
Horace F. Page	1873–1883	California	Republican	1833–1890
John Page	1789–1795	Virginia	Anti-Administration	1743–1808
John Page	1795–1797	Virginia	Democratic-Republican	1743–1808
Robert Page	1799–1801	Virginia	Federalist	1765–1840
Robert N. Page	1903–1917	North Carolina	Democratic	1859–1933
Sherman Page	1833–1837	New York	Democratic	1779–1853
Calvin Paige	1913–1925	Massachusetts	Republican	1848–1930
David R. Paige	1883–1885	Ohio	Democratic	1844–1901
Halbert E. Paine	1865–1871	Wisconsin	Republican	1826–1905
Robert Treat Paine	1855–1857	North Carolina	American	1812–1872
William W. Paine	1870–1871	Georgia	Democratic	1817–1882
Steven Palazzo	2011–2023	Mississippi	Republican	1970–present
Rufus Palen	1839–1841	New York	Whig	1807–1844
John G. Palfrey	1847–1849	Massachusetts	Whig	1796–1881
A. Mitchell Palmer	1909–1915	Pennsylvania	Democratic	1872–1936
Beriah Palmer	1803–1805	New York	Democratic-Republican	1740–1812
Cyrus M. Palmer	1927–1929	Pennsylvania	Republican	1887–1959
Francis W. Palmer	1869–1873	Iowa	Republican	1827–1907
George W. Palmer	1857–1861	New York	Republican	1818–1916
Henry W. Palmer	1901–1907; 1909–1911	Pennsylvania	Republican	1839–1913
John Palmer	1817–1819	New York	Democratic-Republican	1785–1840
John Palmer	1837–1839	New York	Democratic	1785–1840
John William Palmer	1929–1931	Missouri	Republican	1866–1958
Vincent L. Palmisano	1927–1939	Maryland	Democratic	1882–1953
Leon Panetta	1977–1993	California	Democratic	1938–present
Mike Pappas	1997–1999	New Jersey	Republican	1960–present
Quintin Paredes	1936–1938	Philippines	None	1884–1973
Frank Park	1913–1925	Georgia	Democratic	1864–1925
Benjamin Parke	1805–1808	Indiana	None	1777–1835
Abraham X. Parker	1881–1889	New York	Republican	1831–1909
Amasa J. Parker	1837–1839	New York	Democratic	1807–1890
Andrew Parker	1851–1853	Pennsylvania	Democratic	1805–1864
Homer C. Parker	1931–1935	Georgia	Democratic	1885–1946
Hosea Washington Parker	1871–1875	New Hampshire	Democratic	1833–1922
Isaac Parker	1797–1799	Massachusetts	Federalist	1768–1830
Isaac C. Parker	1871–1875	Missouri	Republican	1838–1896
James Parker	1813–1815; 1819–1821	Massachusetts	Democratic-Republican	1768–1837
James Parker	1833–1837	New Jersey	Democratic	1776–1868
James S. Parker	1913–1933	New York	Republican	1867–1933
John M. Parker	1855–1857	New York	Oppositionist	1805–1873
John M. Parker	1857–1859	New York	Republican	1805–1873
Josiah Parker	1789–1793	Virginia	Anti-Administration	1751–1810
Josiah Parker	1793–1795	Virginia	Pro-Administration	1751–1810
Josiah Parker	1795–1801	Virginia	Federalist	1751–1810
Michael Parker	1989–1995	Mississippi	Democratic	1949–present
Michael Parker	1995–1999	Mississippi	Republican	1949–present
Richard Parker	1849–1851	Virginia	Democratic	1810–1893
Richard W. Parker	1895–1911; 1914–1919; 1921–1923	New Jersey	Republican	1848–1923
Samuel W. Parker	1851–1855	Indiana	Whig	1805–1859
Severn E. Parker	1819–1821	Virginia	Democratic-Republican	1787–1836
William H. Parker	1907–1908	South Dakota	Republican	1847–1908
Gorham Parks	1833–1837	Maine	Democratic	1794–1877
Tilman Bacon Parks	1921–1937	Arkansas	Democratic	1872–1950
William Parmenter	1837–1845	Massachusetts	Democratic	1789–1866
Thomas Parran Sr.	1911–1913	Maryland	Republican	1860–1955
William F. Parrett	1889–1893	Indiana	Democratic	1825–1895
Albion Parris	1815–1818	Massachusetts	Democratic-Republican	1788–1857
Stanford Parris	1973–1975; 1981–1991	Virginia	Republican	1929–2010
Virgil D. Parris	1838–1841	Maine	Democratic	1807–1874
Isaac Parrish	1839–1841; 1845–1847	Ohio	Democratic	1804–1860
Lucian W. Parrish	1919–1922	Texas	Democratic	1878–1922
John Fabyan Parrott	1817–1819	New Hampshire	Democratic-Republican	1767–1836
Marcus Junius Parrott	1857–1861	Kansas	Republican	1828–1879
Claude V. Parsons	1930–1941	Illinois	Democratic	1895–1941
Edward Y. Parsons	1875–1876	Kentucky	Democratic	1842–1876
Herbert Parsons	1905–1911	New York	Republican	1869–1925
Richard C. Parsons	1873–1875	Ohio	Republican	1826–1899
Donald B. Partridge	1931–1933	Maine	Republican	1891–1946
George Partridge	1789–1790	Massachusetts	Pro-Administration	1740–1828
Samuel Partridge	1841–1843	New York	Democratic	1790–1883
Thomas M. Paschal	1893–1895	Texas	Democratic	1845–1919
Bill Pascrell	1997–2024	New Jersey	Democratic	1937–2024
Chip Pashayan	1979–1991	California	Republican	1941–present
Otto Passman	1947–1977	Louisiana	Democratic	1900–1988
Ed Pastor	1991–2015	Arizona	Democratic	1943–2018
John Paterson	1803–1805	New York	Democratic-Republican	1744–1808
Thomas J. Paterson	1843–1845	New York	Whig	1805–1885
Bill Patman	1981–1985	Texas	Democratic	1927–2008
Wright Patman	1929–1976	Texas	Democratic	1893–1976
Luther Patrick	1937–1943; 1945–1947	Alabama	Democratic	1894–1957
Edward J. Patten	1963–1981	New Jersey	Democratic	1905–1994
Harold Patten	1949–1955	Arizona	Democratic	1907–1969
John Patten	1793–1794	Delaware	Anti-Administration	1746–1800
John Patten	1795–1797	Delaware	Democratic-Republican	1746–1800
Thomas G. Patten	1911–1917	New York	Democratic	1861–1939
Edward White Patterson	1935–1939	Kansas	Democratic	1895–1940
Ellis E. Patterson	1945–1947	California	Democratic	1897–1985
Francis F. Patterson Jr.	1920–1927	New Jersey	Republican	1867–1935
George Robert Patterson	1901–1906	Pennsylvania	Republican	1863–1906
George W. Patterson	1877–1879	New York	Republican	1799–1879
Gilbert B. Patterson	1903–1907	North Carolina	Democratic	1863–1922
James O. Patterson	1905–1911	South Carolina	Democratic	1857–1911
James T. Patterson	1947–1959	Connecticut	Republican	1908–1989
James W. Patterson	1863–1867	New Hampshire	Republican	1823–1893
Jerry M. Patterson	1975–1985	California	Democratic	1934–2024
John Patterson	1823–1825	Ohio	Democratic-Republican	1771–1848
Josiah Patterson	1891–1897	Tennessee	Democratic	1837–1904
LaFayette L. Patterson	1928–1933	Alabama	Democratic	1888–1987
Liz J. Patterson	1987–1993	South Carolina	Democratic	1939–2018
Malcolm R. Patterson	1901–1906	Tennessee	Democratic	1861–1935
Roscoe C. Patterson	1921–1923	Missouri	Republican	1876–1954
Thomas Patterson	1817–1825	Pennsylvania	Democratic-Republican	1764–1841
Thomas M. Patterson	1875–1876; 1877–1879	Colorado	Democratic	1839–1916
Walter Patterson	1821–1823	New York	Federalist	17??–1852
William Patterson	1833–1837	Ohio	Democratic	1790–1868
William Patterson	1837–1838	New York	Whig	1789–1838
Edward W. Pattison	1975–1979	New York	Democratic	1932–1990
John M. Pattison	1891–1893	Ohio	Democratic	1847–1906
Charles Emory Patton	1911–1915	Pennsylvania	Republican	1859–1937
David Henry Patton	1891–1893	Indiana	Democratic	1837–1914
John Patton	1861–1863; 1887–1889	Pennsylvania	Republican	1823–1897
John Denniston Patton	1883–1885	Pennsylvania	Democratic	1829–1904
John M. Patton	1830–1838	Virginia	Democratic	1797–1858
Nat Patton	1935–1945	Texas	Democratic	1881–1957
John Paul	1881–1883	Virginia	Democratic	1839–1901
John Paul Jr.	1922–1923	Virginia	Republican	1883–1964
Ron Paul	1976–1977; 1979–1985; 1997–2013	Texas	Republican	1935–present
William Paulding Jr.	1811–1813	New York	Democratic-Republican	1770–1854
Erik Paulsen	2009–2019	Minnesota	Republican	1965–present
Levi Pawling	1817–1819	Pennsylvania	Federalist	1773–1845
Bill Paxon	1989–1999	New York	Republican	1954–present
Donald M. Payne	1989–2012	New Jersey	Democratic	1934–2012
Donald Payne Jr.	2012–2024	New Jersey	Democratic	1958–2024
Henry B. Payne	1875–1877	Ohio	Democratic	1810–1896
Lewis F. Payne Jr.	1988–1997	Virginia	Democratic	1945–present
Sereno E. Payne	1883–1887; 1889–1914	New York	Republican	1843–1914
William W. Payne	1841–1847	Alabama	Democratic	1807–1874
Lemuel Paynter	1837–1841	Pennsylvania	Democratic	1788–1863
Thomas H. Paynter	1889–1895	Kentucky	Democratic	1851–1921
Lewis E. Payson	1881–1891	Illinois	Republican	1840–1909
Charles Edward Pearce	1897–1901	Missouri	Republican	1842–1902
Dutee Jerauld Pearce	1825–1833	Rhode Island	National Republican	1789–1849
Dutee Jerauld Pearce	1833–1837	Rhode Island	Anti-Masonic	1789–1849
James Pearce	1835–1837	Maryland	National Republican	1805–1862
James Pearce	1837–1839; 1841–1843	Maryland	Whig	1805–1862
John Jamison Pearce	1855–1857	Pennsylvania	Oppositionist	1826–1912
Steve Pearce	2003-2009; 2011–2019	New Mexico	Republican	1947–present
George Alexander Pearre	1899–1911	Maryland	Republican	1860–1923
Albert J. Pearson	1891–1895	Ohio	Democratic	1846–1905
Herron C. Pearson	1935–1943	Tennessee	Democratic	1890–1953
John James Pearson	1836–1837	Pennsylvania	National Republican	1800–1888
Joseph Pearson	1809–1815	North Carolina	Federalist	1776–1834
Richmond Pearson	1895–1899; 1900–1901	North Carolina	Republican	1852–1923
Don Pease	1977–1993	Ohio	Democratic	1931–2002
Ed Pease	1997–2001	Indiana	Republican	1951–present
Charles H. Peaslee	1847–1853	New Hampshire	Democratic	1804–1866
Hubert H. Peavey	1923–1935	Wisconsin	Republican	1881–1937
Erasmus D. Peck	1870–1873	Ohio	Republican	1808–1876
George W. Peck	1855–1857	Michigan	Democratic	1818–1905
Jared V. Peck	1853–1855	New York	Democratic	1816–1891
Lucius Benedict Peck	1847–1851	Vermont	Democratic	1802–1866
Luther C. Peck	1837–1841	New York	Whig	1800–1876
Rufus Wheeler Peckham	1853–1855	New York	Democratic	1809–1873
Thomas Baldwin Peddie	1877–1879	New Jersey	Republican	1808–1889
Preston E. Peden	1947–1949	Oklahoma	Democratic	1914–1985
Harmanus Peek	1819–1821	New York	Democratic-Republican	1782–1838
Samuel W. Peel	1883–1893	Arkansas	Democratic	1831–1924
Stanton J. Peelle	1881–1884	Indiana	Republican	1843–1928
George C. Peery	1923–1929	Virginia	Democratic	1873–1952
John Pegram	1818–1819	Virginia	Democratic-Republican	1773–1831
Joseph Peirce	1801–1802	New Hampshire	Federalist	1748–1812
Robert B. F. Peirce	1881–1883	Indiana	Republican	1843–1898
Charles Pelham	1873–1875	Alabama	Republican	1835–1908
Herbert Pell	1919–1921	New York	Democratic	1884–1961
Thomas Pelly	1953–1973	Washington	Republican	1902–1973
Mary Peltola	2022–2025	Alaska	Democratic	1973–present
Guy R. Pelton	1855–1857	New York	Oppositionist	1824–1890
Greg Pence	2019–2025	Indiana	Republican	1956–present
Lafe Pence	1893–1895	Colorado	Populist	1857–1923
Mike Pence	2001–2013	Indiana	Republican	1959–present
Edmund H. Pendleton	1831–1833	New York	National Republican	1788–1862
George C. Pendleton	1893–1897	Texas	Democratic	1845–1913
George H. Pendleton	1857–1865	Ohio	Democratic	1825–1889
James M. Pendleton	1871–1875	Rhode Island	Republican	1822–1889
John O. Pendleton	1889–1890; 1891–1895	West Virginia	Democratic	1851–1916
John S. Pendleton	1845–1849	Virginia	Whig	1802–1868
Nathanael G. Pendleton	1841–1843	Ohio	Whig	1793–1861
John B. Penington	1887–1891	Delaware	Democratic	1825–1902
Alexander G. Penn	1850–1853	Louisiana	Democratic	1799–1866
Ebenezer J. Penniman	1851–1853	Michigan	Whig	1804–1890
Alexander C. M. Pennington	1853–1855	New Jersey	Whig	1810–1867
Alexander C. M. Pennington	1855–1857	New Jersey	Oppositionist	1810–1867
William Pennington	1859–1861	New Jersey	Republican	1796–1862
Tim Penny	1983–1995	Minnesota	Democratic-Farmer-Labor	1951–present
Isaac S. Pennybacker	1837–1839	Virginia	Democratic	1805–1847
Claude Pepper	1963–1989	Florida	Democratic	1900–1989
Irvin S. Pepper	1911–1913	Iowa	Democratic	1876–1913
Legrand W. Perce	1870–1873	Mississippi	Republican	1836–1911
Francisco Perea	1863–1865	New Mexico	Republican	1830–1913
Pedro Perea	1899–1901	New Mexico	Republican	1852–1906
Sidney Perham	1863–1869	Maine	Republican	1819–1907
Bishop Perkins	1853–1855	New York	Democratic	1787–1866
Bishop W. Perkins	1883–1891	Kansas	Republican	1841–1894
Chris Perkins	1984–1993	Kentucky	Democratic	1954–present
Carl D. Perkins	1949–1984	Kentucky	Democratic	1912–1984
Elias Perkins	1801–1803	Connecticut	Federalist	1767–1845
George D. Perkins	1891–1899	Iowa	Republican	1840–1914
James Breck Perkins	1901–1910	New York	Republican	1847–1910
Jared Perkins	1851–1853	New Hampshire	Whig	1793–1854
John Perkins Jr.	1853–1855	Louisiana	Democratic	1819–1885
Randolph Perkins	1921–1936	New Jersey	Republican	1871–1936
Nathan D. Perlman	1920–1927	New York	Republican	1887–1952
Ed Perlmutter	2007–2023	Colorado	Democratic	1953–present
Tom Perriello	2009–2011	Virginia	Democratic	1974–present
Augustus L. Perrill	1845–1847	Ohio	Democratic	1807–1882
Aaron F. Perry	1871–1872	Ohio	Republican	1815–1893
Eli Perry	1871–1875	New York	Democratic	1799–1881
John J. Perry	1855–1857	Maine	Oppositionist	1811–1897
John J. Perry	1859–1861	Maine	Republican	1811–1897
Nehemiah Perry	1861–1865	New Jersey	Democratic	1816–1881
Thomas Johns Perry	1845–1847	Maryland	Democratic	1807–1871
William H. Perry	1885–1891	South Carolina	Democratic	1839–1902
Seymour H. Person	1931–1933	Michigan	Republican	1879–1957
Henry Persons	1879–1881	Georgia	Independent Democrat	1834–1910
José Lorenzo Pesquera	1932–1933	Puerto Rico	Independent	1882–1950
George Peter	1816–1819	Maryland	Federalist	1779–1861
George Peter	1825–1827	Maryland	Democratic	1779–1861
Andrew J. Peters	1907–1914	Massachusetts	Democratic	1872–1938
Gary Peters	2009–2015	Michigan	Democratic	1958–present
John A. Peters	1867–1873	Maine	Republican	1822–1904
John A. Peters	1913–1922	Maine	Republican	1864–1953
Mason S. Peters	1897–1899	Kansas	Populist	1844–1914
Samuel R. Peters	1883–1891	Kansas	Republican	1842–1910
Andrew Petersen	1921–1923	New York	Republican	1870–1952
Collin Peterson	1991–2021	Minnesota	Democratic	1944–present
Hugh Peterson	1935–1947	Georgia	Democratic	1898–1961
J. Hardin Peterson	1933–1951	Florida	Democratic	1894–1978
John B. Peterson	1913–1915	Indiana	Democratic	1850–1944
John Peterson	1997–2009	Pennsylvania	Republican	1938–present
M. Blaine Peterson	1961–1963	Utah	Democratic	1906–1985
Pete Peterson	1991–1997	Florida	Democratic	1935–present
Tom Petri	1979–2015	Wisconsin	Republican	1940–present
George Petrie	1847–1849	New York	Independent Democrat	1793–1879
David Petrikin	1837–1841	Pennsylvania	Democratic	1788–1847
Samuel B. Pettengill	1931–1939	Indiana	Democratic	1886–1974
Augustus Herman Pettibone	1881–1887	Tennessee	Republican	1835–1918
Ebenezer Pettigrew	1835–1837	North Carolina	National Republican	1783–1848
Richard F. Pettigrew	1881–1883	Dakota	Republican	1848–1926
Jerry Pettis	1967–1975	California	Republican	1916–1975
Solomon Newton Pettis	1868–1869	Pennsylvania	Republican	1827–1900
Shirley Neil Pettis	1975–1979	California	Republican	1924–2016
Spencer Darwin Pettis	1829–1831	Missouri	Democratic	1802–1831
John Pettit	1843–1849	Indiana	Democratic	1807–1877
John U. Pettit	1855–1857	Indiana	Oppositionist	1820–1881
John U. Pettit	1857–1861	Indiana	Republican	1820–1881
Peter A. Peyser	1971–1977	New York	Republican	1921–2014
Peter A. Peyser	1979–1983	New York	Democratic	1921–2014
Theodore A. Peyser	1933–1937	New York	Democratic	1873–1937
Balie Peyton	1833–1835	Tennessee	Democratic	1803–1878
Balie Peyton	1835–1837	Tennessee	National Republican	1803–1878
Joseph Hopkins Peyton	1843–1845	Tennessee	Whig	1808–1845
Samuel Peyton	1847–1849; 1857–1861	Kentucky	Democratic	1804–1870
Joseph L. Pfeifer	1935–1951	New York	Democratic	1892–1974
William L. Pfeiffer	1949–1951	New York	Republican	1907–1985
Gracie Pfost	1953–1963	Idaho	Democratic	1906–1965
William T. Pheiffer	1941–1943	New York	Republican	1898–1986
James Phelan Jr.	1887–1891	Tennessee	Democratic	1856–1891
Michael Francis Phelan	1913–1921	Massachusetts	Democratic	1875–1941
Charles E. Phelps	1865–1867	Maryland	Unconditional Unionist	1833–1908
Charles E. Phelps	1867–1869	Maryland	Conservative	1833–1908
Darwin Phelps	1869–1871	Pennsylvania	Republican	1807–1879
David Phelps	1999–2003	Illinois	Democratic	1947–present
Elisha Phelps	1819–1821	Connecticut	Democratic-Republican	1779–1847
Elisha Phelps	1825–1829	Connecticut	National Republican	1779–1847
James Phelps	1875–1883	Connecticut	Democratic	1822–1900
John S. Phelps	1845–1863	Missouri	Democratic	1814–1886
Lancelot Phelps	1835–1839	Connecticut	Democratic	1784–1866
Oliver Phelps	1803–1805	New York	Democratic-Republican	1749–1809
Timothy Guy Phelps	1861–1863	California	Republican	1824–1899
William Wallace Phelps	1858–1859	Minnesota	Democratic	1826–1873
William Walter Phelps	1873–1875; 1883–1889	New Jersey	Republican	1839–1894
Philip J. Philbin	1943–1971	Massachusetts	Democratic	1898–1972
John F. Philips	1875–1877; 1880–1881	Missouri	Democratic	1834–1919
Alfred N. Phillips	1937–1939	Connecticut	Democratic	1894–1970
Dayton E. Phillips	1947–1951	Tennessee	Republican	1910–1980
Dean Phillips	2019–2025	Minnesota	Democratic-Farmer-Labor	1969–present
Fremont O. Phillips	1899–1901	Ohio	Republican	1856–1936
Henry M. Phillips	1857–1859	Pennsylvania	Democratic	1811–1884
John Phillips	1821–1823	Pennsylvania	Federalist	N/A
John J. Phillips	1943–1957	California	Republican	1887–1983
Philip Phillips	1853–1855	Alabama	Democratic	1807–1884
Stephen C. Phillips	1834–1837	Massachusetts	National Republican	1801–1857
Stephen C. Phillips	1837–1838	Massachusetts	Whig	1801–1857
Thomas Wharton Phillips	1893–1897	Pennsylvania	Republican	1835–1912
Thomas Wharton Phillips Jr.	1923–1927	Pennsylvania	Republican	1874–1956
William A. Phillips	1873–1879	Kansas	Republican	1824–1893
Robert Philson	1819–1821	Pennsylvania	Democratic-Republican	1759–1831
Elijah Phister	1879–1883	Kentucky	Democratic	1822–1887
Jonas P. Phoenix	1843–1845; 1849–1851	New York	Whig	1788–1859
Andrew Pickens	1793–1795	South Carolina	Anti-Administration	1739–1817
Francis Wilkinson Pickens	1834–1839	South Carolina	Nullifier	1805–1869
Francis Wilkinson Pickens	1839–1843	South Carolina	Democratic	1805–1869
Israel Pickens	1811–1817	North Carolina	Democratic-Republican	1780–1827
Chip Pickering	1997–2009	Mississippi	Republican	1963–present
Timothy Pickering	1813–1817	Massachusetts	Federalist	1745–1829
Charles E. Pickett	1909–1913	Iowa	Republican	1866–1930
Owen B. Pickett	1987–2001	Virginia	Democratic	1930–2010
Tom Pickett	1945–1952	Texas	Democratic	1906–1980
J. J. Pickle	1963–1995	Texas	Democratic	1913–2005
John Pickler	1889–1897	South Dakota	Republican	1844–1910
Benjamin Pickman Jr.	1809–1811	Massachusetts	Federalist	1763–1843
James N. Pidcock	1885–1889	New Jersey	Democratic	1836–1899
Charles Wilson Pierce	1868–1869	Alabama	Republican	1823–1907
Franklin Pierce	1833–1837	New Hampshire	Democratic	1804–1869
Henry L. Pierce	1873–1877	Massachusetts	Republican	1825–1896
Ray V. Pierce	1879–1880	New York	Republican	1840–1914
Rice Alexander Pierce	1883–1885; 1889–1893; 1897–1905	Tennessee	Democratic	1848–1936
Wallace E. Pierce	1939–1940	New York	Republican	1881–1940
Walter M. Pierce	1933–1943	Oregon	Democratic	1861–1954
Pedro Pierluisi	2009–2017	Puerto Rico	New Progressive	1959–present
Isaac Pierson	1827–1831	New Jersey	National Republican	1770–1833
Jeremiah H. Pierson	1821–1823	New York	Democratic-Republican	1766–1855
Job Pierson	1831–1835	New York	Democratic	1791–1860
James P. Pigott	1893–1895	Connecticut	Democratic	1852–1919
Austin F. Pike	1873–1875	New Hampshire	Republican	1819–1886
Frederick A. Pike	1861–1869	Maine	Republican	1816–1886
James Pike	1855–1857	New Hampshire	American	1818–1895
James Pike	1857–1859	New Hampshire	Republican	1818–1895
Otis G. Pike	1961–1979	New York	Democratic	1921–2014
J. L. Pilcher	1953–1965	Georgia	Democratic	1898–1981
William A. Pile	1867–1869	Missouri	Republican	1829–1889
John R. Pillion	1953–1965	New York	Republican	1904–1978
Timothy Pilsbury	1846–1849	Texas	Democratic	1789–1858
Charles Pinckney	1819–1821	South Carolina	Democratic-Republican	1757–1824
Henry L. Pinckney	1833–1837	South Carolina	Nullifier	1794–1863
John M. Pinckney	1903–1905	Texas	Democratic	1845–1905
Thomas Pinckney	1797–1801	South Carolina	Federalist	1750–1828
James Pindall	1817–1820	Virginia	Federalist	c. 1783–1825
John S. Pindar	1885–1887; 1890–1891	New York	Democratic	1835–1907
Jesús T. Piñero	1945–1946	Puerto Rico	Democratic	1897–1952
William Pinkney	1791	Maryland	Pro-Administration	1764–1822
William Pinkney	1815–1816	Maryland	Democratic-Republican	1764–1822
William Piper	1811–1817	Pennsylvania	Democratic-Republican	1774–1852
William Adam Piper	1875–1877	California	Democratic	1826–1899
William A. Pirce	1885–1887	Rhode Island	Republican	1824–1891
Alexander Pirnie	1959–1973	New York	Republican	1903–1982
Nathaniel Pitcher	1819–1823	New York	Democratic-Republican	1777–1836
Nathaniel Pitcher	1831–1833	New York	Democratic	1777–1836
Timothy Pitkin	1805–1819	Connecticut	Federalist	1766–1847
Charles Wesley Pitman	1849–1851	Pennsylvania	Whig	????–1871
Mahlon Pitney	1895–1899	New Jersey	Republican	1858–1924
Robert Pittenger	2013–2019	North Carolina	Republican	1948–present
William Pittenger	1929–1933; 1935–1937; 1939–1947	Minnesota	Republican	1885–1951
Joe Pitts	1997–2017	Pennsylvania	Democratic	1939–present
Harris M. Plaisted	1875–1877	Maine	Republican	1828–1898
David Plant	1827–1829	Connecticut	National Republican	1783–1851
Tobias A. Plants	1865–1869	Ohio	Republican	1811–1887
Thomas Plater	1801–1805	Maryland	Federalist	1769–1830
Edmund Platt	1913–1920	New York	Republican	1865–1939
James H. Platt Jr.	1870–1875	Virginia	Republican	1837–1894
Jonas Platt	1799–1801	New York	Federalist	1769–1834
Thomas C. Platt	1873–1877	New York	Republican	1833–1910
Todd Platts	2001–2013	Pennsylvania	Republican	1962–present
Vance Plauché	1941–1943	Louisiana	Democratic	1897–1976
James Pleasants	1811–1819	Virginia	Democratic-Republican	1769–1836
Walter C. Ploeser	1941–1949	Missouri	Republican	1907–1993
Thomas S. Plowman	1897–1898	Alabama	Democratic	1843–1919
Ralph Plumb	1885–1889	Illinois	Republican	1816–1903
Arnold Plumer	1837–1839; 1841–1843	Pennsylvania	Democratic	1801–1869
George Plumer	1821–1825	Pennsylvania	Democratic-Republican	1762–1843
George Plumer	1825–1827	Pennsylvania	Democratic	1762–1843
William Plumer Jr.	1819–1825	New Hampshire	Democratic-Republican	1789–1854
Charles A. Plumley	1934–1951	Vermont	Republican	1875–1964
Frank Plumley	1909–1915	Vermont	Republican	1844–1924
Franklin E. Plummer	1831–1835	Mississippi	Democratic	????–1847
William R. Poage	1937–1978	Texas	Democratic	1899–1987
Bertram L. Podell	1968–1975	New York	Democratic	1925–2005
Ted Poe	2005–2019	Texas	Republican	1948–present
Henry Poehler	1879–1881	Minnesota	Democratic	1833–1912
Richard Harding Poff	1953–1972	Virginia	Republican	1923–2011
George Poindexter	1807–1813; 1817–1819	Mississippi	Democratic-Republican	1779–1853
Miles Poindexter	1909–1911	Washington	Republican	1868–1946
Joel Roberts Poinsett	1821–1825	South Carolina	Democratic-Republican	1779–1851
Joel Roberts Poinsett	1825	South Carolina	Democratic	1779–1851
Santiago Polanco-Abreu	1965–1969	Puerto Rico	Democratic	1920–1988
Luke P. Poland	1867–1875; 1883–1885	Vermont	Republican	1815–1887
Bruce Poliquin	2015–2019	Maine	Republican	1953–present
Jared Polis	2009–2019	Colorado	Democratic	1975–present
Albert F. Polk	1917–1919	Delaware	Democratic	1869–1955
James G. Polk	1931–1941; 1949–1959	Ohio	Democratic	1896–1959
James K. Polk	1825–1839	Tennessee	Democratic	1795–1849
Rufus King Polk	1899–1902	Pennsylvania	Democratic	1866–1902
William Hawkins Polk	1851–1853	Tennessee	Independent Democrat	1815–1862
Ernest M. Pollard	1905–1909	Nebraska	Republican	1869–1939
Henry Moses Pollard	1877–1879	Missouri	Republican	1836–1904
Howard Wallace Pollock	1967–1971	Alaska	Republican	1920–2011
James Pollock	1844–1849	Pennsylvania	Whig	1810–1890
Daniel Polsley	1867–1869	West Virginia	Republican	1803–1877
Richard Pombo	1993–2007	California	Republican	1961–present
Charles Pomeroy	1869–1871	Iowa	Republican	1825–1891
Earl Pomeroy	1993–2011	North Dakota	Democratic	1952–present
Theodore M. Pomeroy	1861–1869	New York	Republican	1824–1905
Mike Pompeo	2011–2017	Kansas	Republican	1963–present
Benjamin Pond	1811–1813	New York	Democratic-Republican	1768–1814
Joe R. Pool	1963–1968	Texas	Democratic	1911–1968
Walter F. Pool	1883	North Carolina	Republican	1850–1883
Theodore L. Poole	1895–1897	New York	Republican	1840–1900
John Pope	1837–1843	Kentucky	Whig	1770–1845
Nathaniel Pope	1817–1818	Illinois	None	1784–1850
Patrick H. Pope	1833–1835	Kentucky	Democratic	1806–1841
Earley F. Poppleton	1875–1877	Ohio	Democratic	1834–1899
Albert G. Porter	1859–1863	Indiana	Republican	1824–1897
Charles H. Porter	1870–1873	Virginia	Republican	1833–1897
Charles O. Porter	1957–1961	Oregon	Democratic	1919–2006
Gilchrist Porter	1851–1853	Missouri	Whig	1817–1894
Gilchrist Porter	1855–1857	Missouri	Oppositionist	1817–1894
Henry Kirke Porter	1903–1905	Pennsylvania	Independent Republican	1840–1921
James Porter	1817–1819	New York	Democratic-Republican	1787–1839
John Porter	1806–1811	Pennsylvania	Democratic-Republican	N/A
John Porter	1980–2001	Illinois	Republican	1935–2022
Jon Porter	2003–2009	Nevada	Republican	1955–present
Katie Porter	2019–2025	California	Democratic	1974–present
Peter A. Porter	1907–1909	New York	Independent Republican	1853–1925
Peter Buell Porter	1809–1813; 1815–1816	New York	Democratic-Republican	1773–1844
Stephen G. Porter	1911–1930	Pennsylvania	Republican	1869–1930
Timothy H. Porter	1825–1827	New York	National Republican	1785–1845
Rob Portman	1993–2005	Ohio	Republican	1955–present
Bill Posey	2009–2025	Florida	Republican	1947–2026
Francis B. Posey	1889	Indiana	Republican	1848–1915
Glenn Poshard	1989–1999	Illinois	Democratic	1945–present
George Adams Post	1883–1885	Pennsylvania	Democratic	1854–1925
James D. Post	1911–1915	Ohio	Democratic	1863–1921
Jotham Post Jr.	1813–1815	New York	Federalist	1771–1817
Morton Everel Post	1881–1885	Wyoming	Democratic	1840–1933
Philip S. Post	1887–1895	Illinois	Republican	1833–1895
Charles Debrille Poston	1864–1865	Arizona	Republican	1825–1902
Allen Potter	1875–1877	Michigan	Democratic	1818–1885
Charles E. Potter	1947–1952	Michigan	Republican	1916–1979
Clarkson Nott Potter	1869–1875; 1877–1879	New York	Democratic	1825–1882
Elisha Reynolds Potter	1796–1797; 1809–1815	Rhode Island	Federalist	1764–1835
Elisha R. Potter	1843–1845	Rhode Island	Law and Order	1811–1882
Emery D. Potter	1843–1845; 1849–1851	Ohio	Democratic	1804–1896
John F. Potter	1857–1863	Wisconsin	Republican	1817–1899
Orlando B. Potter	1883–1885	New York	Democratic	1823–1894
Robert Potter	1829–1831	North Carolina	Democratic	c. 1800–1842
William Wilson Potter	1837–1839	Pennsylvania	Democratic	1792–1839
Emory B. Pottle	1857–1861	New York	Republican	1815–1891
David Potts Jr.	1831–1839	Pennsylvania	Anti-Masonic	1794–1863
David M. Potts	1947–1949	New York	Republican	1906–1976
Edward W. Pou	1901–1934	North Carolina	Democratic	1863–1934
Norris Poulson	1943–1945; 1947–1953	California	Republican	1895–1982
Thaddeus C. Pound	1877–1883	Wisconsin	Republican	1833–1914
Adam Clayton Powell Jr.	1945–1967; 1969–1971	New York	Democratic	1908–1972
Alfred H. Powell	1825–1827	Virginia	National Republican	1781–1831
Cuthbert Powell	1841–1843	Virginia	Whig	1775–1849
Joseph Powell	1875–1877	Pennsylvania	Democratic	1828–1904
Leven Powell	1799–1801	Virginia	Federalist	1737–1810
Paulus Powell	1849–1859	Virginia	Democratic	1809–1874
Samuel Powell	1815–1817	Tennessee	Democratic-Republican	1776–1841
Walter E. Powell	1971–1975	Ohio	Republican	1931–2020
Caleb Powers	1911–1919	Kentucky	Republican	1869–1932
D. Lane Powers	1933–1945	New Jersey	Republican	1896–1968
Gershom Powers	1829–1831	New York	Democratic	1789–1831
H. Henry Powers	1891–1901	Vermont	Republican	1835–1913
Llewellyn Powers	1877–1879; 1901–1908	Maine	Republican	1836–1908
Samuel L. Powers	1901–1905	Massachusetts	Republican	1848–1929
Julien de Lallande Poydras	1809–1811	Orleans	None	1740–1824
C. Frederick Pracht	1943–1945	Pennsylvania	Republican	1880–1950
Anning Smith Prall	1923–1935	New York	Democratic	1870–1937
Charles Clarence Pratt	1909–1911	Pennsylvania	Republican	1854–1916
Eliza Jane Pratt	1946–1947	North Carolina	Democratic	1902–1981
Harcourt J. Pratt	1925–1933	New York	Republican	1866–1934
Harry H. Pratt	1915–1919	New York	Republican	1864–1932
Henry Otis Pratt	1873–1877	Iowa	Republican	1838–1931
James T. Pratt	1853–1855	Connecticut	Democratic	1802–1887
Joseph Marmaduke Pratt	1944–1945	Pennsylvania	Republican	1891–1946
Le Gage Pratt	1907–1909	New Jersey	Democratic	1852–1911
Ruth Baker Pratt	1929–1933	New York	Republican	1877–1965
Zadock Pratt	1837–1839; 1843–1845	New York	Democratic	1790–1871
Charles Nelson Pray	1907–1913	Montana	Republican	1868–1963
John Holmes Prentiss	1837–1841	New York	Democratic	1784–1861
Seargent Smith Prentiss	1838–1839	Mississippi	Whig	1808–1850
Cyrus D. Prescott	1879–1883	New York	Republican	1836–1902
Larry Pressler	1975–1979	South Dakota	Republican	1942–present
Francis Preston	1793–1795	Virginia	Anti-Administration	1765–1835
Francis Preston	1795–1797	Virginia	Democratic-Republican	1765–1835
Jacob Alexander Preston	1843–1845	Maryland	Whig	1796–1868
Prince Hulon Preston Jr.	1947–1961	Georgia	Democratic	1908–1961
William Preston	1852–1855	Kentucky	Whig	1816–1887
William Ballard Preston	1847–1849	Virginia	Whig	1805–1862
L. Richardson Preyer	1969–1981	North Carolina	Democratic	1919–2001
Andrew Price	1889–1897	Louisiana	Democratic	1854–1909
Bob Price	1967–1975	Texas	Republican	1927–2004
David Price	1987–1995; 1997–2023	North Carolina	Democratic	1940–present
Emory H. Price	1943–1949	Florida	Democratic	1899–1976
Hiram Price	1863–1869; 1877–1881	Iowa	Republican	1814–1901
Hugh H. Price	1887	Wisconsin	Republican	1859–1904
Jesse Price	1914–1919	Maryland	Democratic	1863–1939
Melvin Price	1945–1988	Illinois	Democratic	1905–1988
Rodman M. Price	1851–1853	New Jersey	Democratic	1816–1894
Sterling Price	1845–1846	Missouri	Democratic	1809–1867
Thomas L. Price	1862–1863	Missouri	Democratic	1809–1870
Tom Price	2005–2017	Georgia	Republican	1954–present
William P. Price	1870–1873	Georgia	Democratic	1835–1908
William T. Price	1883–1886	Wisconsin	Republican	1824–1886
Auburn Pridemore	1877–1879	Virginia	Democratic	1837–1900
Percy Priest	1941–1956	Tennessee	Democratic	1900–1956
Charles H. Prince	1868–1869	Georgia	Republican	1837–1912
George W. Prince	1895–1913	Illinois	Republican	1854–1939
William Prince	1823–1824	Indiana	Democratic-Republican	1772–1824
Elizur H. Prindle	1871–1873	New York	Republican	1829–1890
Joseph C. Pringey	1921–1923	Oklahoma	Republican	1858–1935
Benjamin Pringle	1853–1855	New York	Whig	1807–1887
Benjamin Pringle	1855–1857	New York	Oppositionist	1807–1887
George M. Pritchard	1929–1931	North Carolina	Republican	1886–1955
Joel Pritchard	1973–1985	Washington	Republican	1925–1997
George H. Proffit	1839–1843	Indiana	Whig	1807–1847
Stanley A. Prokop	1959–1961	Pennsylvania	Democratic	1909–1977
William Farrand Prosser	1869–1871	Tennessee	Republican	1834–1911
Solomon F. Prouty	1911–1915	Iowa	Republican	1854–1927
Winston L. Prouty	1951–1959	Vermont	Republican	1906–1971
John V. L. Pruyn	1863–1865; 1867–1869	New York	Democratic	1811–1877
Deborah Pryce	1993–2009	Ohio	Republican	1951–present
David Pryor	1966–1973	Arkansas	Democratic	1934–2024
Luke Pryor	1883–1885	Alabama	Democratic	1820–1900
Roger Atkinson Pryor	1859–1861	Virginia	Democratic	1828–1919
Roman Pucinski	1959–1973	Illinois	Democratic	1919–2002
James L. Pugh	1859–1861	Alabama	Democratic	1820–1907
John Pugh	1805–1809	Pennsylvania	Democratic-Republican	1761–1842
John H. Pugh	1877–1879	New Jersey	Republican	1827–1905
Samuel Johnson Pugh	1895–1901	Kentucky	Republican	1850–1922
Cornelius Amory Pugsley	1901–1903	New York	Democratic	1850–1936
Jacob J. Pugsley	1887–1891	Ohio	Republican	1838–1920
Arsène Pujo	1903–1913	Louisiana	Democratic	1861–1939
Joseph Pulitzer	1885–1886	New York	Democratic	1847–1911
Graham B. Purcell Jr.	1962–1973	Texas	Democratic	1919–2011
Meade Purdy	1843–1845	New York	Democratic	1796–1870
William J. Purman	1873–1875; 1875–1877	Florida	Republican	1840–1928
Fred S. Purnell	1917–1933	Indiana	Republican	1882–1939
Carl Pursell	1977–1993	Michigan	Republican	1932–2009
Samuel Anderson Purviance	1855–1857	Pennsylvania	Oppositionist	1809–1882
Samuel Anderson Purviance	1857–1859	Pennsylvania	Republican	1809–1882
Samuel D. Purviance	1803–1805	North Carolina	Federalist	1774–1806
Richard Clauselle Puryear	1853–1855	North Carolina	Whig	1801–1867
Richard Clauselle Puryear	1855–1857	North Carolina	American	1801–1867
William Henry Mills Pusey	1883–1885	Iowa	Democratic	1826–1900
Adam Putnam	2001–2011	Florida	Republican	1974–present
Harvey Putnam	1838–1839; 1847–1851	New York	Whig	1793–1855
