= John Posey =

John Posey is the name of:

- John Wesley Posey (1801–1884), American abolitionist
- John Adams Posey (1889–1963), American politician
- John Posey (actor), American actor, father of actor Tyler Posey
