= John Boehne =

John Boehne may refer to:

- John W. Boehne (1856–1946), U.S. Representative from Indiana from 1909 to 1913
- John W. Boehne Jr. (1895–1973), U.S. Representative from Indiana from 1931 to 1943
