= Indiana's 1st congressional district =

U.S. House district for Indiana

Coordinates: 41°30′N 87°0′W

- Interactive map of district boundaries since January 3, 2023
- Representative: Frank J. Mrvan; D–Highland
- Area: 2,209.37 mi^{2} (5,722.2 km^{2})
- Distribution: 87.02% urban; 12.98% rural
- Population (2025): 767,779
- Median household income: $75,749
- Ethnicity: 59.4% White; 18.5% Black; 16.5% Hispanic; 3.7% Two or more races; 1.4% Asian; 0.5% other
- Cook PVI: D+1

Indiana's 1st congressional district is an electoral district for the U.S. Congress in Northwestern Indiana. The district is based in Gary and its surrounding suburbs and exurbs. It consists of all of Lake and Porter counties, as well as most of the northwestern part of LaPorte County, on the border with Michigan. Redistricting passed by the Indiana General Assembly in 2011 shifted the district's boundaries, effective January 2013, to include all of Lake and Porter counties and the western and northwestern townships of La Porte County, while moving Benton, Jasper and Newton counties out of the district.

The district is currently represented by Democrat Frank J. Mrvan. He was sworn in on January 3, 2021. The district's character is very different from the rest of Indiana. It includes almost all of the Indiana side of the Chicago metropolitan area. While Porter and LaPorte are Republican leaning counties, Lake County is more Democratic. Lake County contains two-thirds of the district's population. The district has not elected a Republican to Congress in 96 years, making it one of the longest continuously Democratic districts in the nation. Among Indiana's congressional districts, only the Indianapolis-based 7th district is more Democratic.

== Recent election results from statewide races ==
Year	Office	Results
2008	President	Obama 63% - 36%
2012	President	Obama 62% - 38%
2012	Senate	Donnelly 66% - 31%
2012	Governor	Gregg 64% - 34%
2016	President	Clinton 53% - 41%
2016	Senate	Bayh 58% - 38%
2016	Governor	Gregg 61% - 36%
2016	Attorney General	Arredondo 59% - 41%
2018	Senate	Donnelly 60% - 37%
2020	President	Biden 53% - 45%
2020	Governor	Myers 47.3% - 46.8%
2020	Attorney General	Weinzapfel 54% - 46%
2022	Senate	McDermott Jr. 52% - 46%
2022	Treasurer	McClellan 51% - 49%
2022	Auditor	Brooks 49% - 48%
2022	Secretary of State	Wells 50% - 47%
2024	President	Harris 49.4% - 49.0%
2024	Senate	McCray 50% - 48%
2024	Governor	McCormick 51% - 47%
2024	Attorney General	Wells 50.2% - 49.8%

== Composition ==
For the 118th and successive Congresses (based on redistricting following the 2020 census), the district contains all or portions of the following counties and townships:

Lake County (11)

All 11 townships

LaPorte County (6)

Center (part, shared with 2nd; includes part of La Porte), Coolspring, Michigan, New Durham, Scipio, Springfield

Porter County (12)

All 12 townships

== List of members representing the district ==
Representative	Party	Term	Cong ress	Electoral history	Location
District created March 4, 1823
William Prince (Princeton)	Democratic- Republican	March 4, 1823 – September 8, 1824	18th	Elected in 1822. Announced retirement then died.	1823–1833; Daviess, Dubois, Gibson, Greene, Knox, Lawrence, Martin, Monroe, Morgan, Orange, Owen, Parke, Perry, Pike, Posey, Putnam, Spencer, Sullivan, Vanderburgh, Vigo, and Warrick Counties
Vacant		September 8, 1824 – December 23, 1824	18th		1823–1833; Daviess, Dubois, Gibson, Greene, Knox, Lawrence, Martin, Monroe, Morgan, Orange, Owen, Parke, Perry, Pike, Posey, Putnam, Spencer, Sullivan, Vanderburgh, Vigo, and Warrick Counties
Jacob Call (Princeton)	Democratic- Republican (Note: Supported the Jackson faction in the 1824 presidential election)	December 23, 1824 – March 3, 1825	18th	Elected only to finish Prince's term, but not the next term.	1823–1833; Daviess, Dubois, Gibson, Greene, Knox, Lawrence, Martin, Monroe, Morgan, Orange, Owen, Parke, Perry, Pike, Posey, Putnam, Spencer, Sullivan, Vanderburgh, Vigo, and Warrick Counties
Ratliff Boon (Boonville)	Jacksonian	March 4, 1825 – March 3, 1827	19th	Elected in 1824. Lost re-election.	1823–1833; Daviess, Dubois, Gibson, Greene, Knox, Lawrence, Martin, Monroe, Morgan, Orange, Owen, Parke, Perry, Pike, Posey, Putnam, Spencer, Sullivan, Vanderburgh, Vigo, and Warrick Counties
Thomas H. Blake (Terre Haute)	Anti-Jacksonian	March 4, 1827 – March 3, 1829	20th	Elected in 1826. Lost re-election.	1823–1833; Daviess, Dubois, Gibson, Greene, Knox, Lawrence, Martin, Monroe, Morgan, Orange, Owen, Parke, Perry, Pike, Posey, Putnam, Spencer, Sullivan, Vanderburgh, Vigo, and Warrick Counties
Ratliff Boon (Boonville)	Jacksonian	March 4, 1829 – March 3, 1837	21st 22nd 23rd 24th 25th	Elected in 1828. Re-elected in 1831. Re-elected in 1833. Re-elected in 1835. Re-elected in 1837. Retired.	1823–1833; Daviess, Dubois, Gibson, Greene, Knox, Lawrence, Martin, Monroe, Morgan, Orange, Owen, Parke, Perry, Pike, Posey, Putnam, Spencer, Sullivan, Vanderburgh, Vigo, and Warrick Counties
Ratliff Boon (Boonville)	Jacksonian	March 4, 1829 – March 3, 1837	21st 22nd 23rd 24th 25th	Elected in 1828. Re-elected in 1831. Re-elected in 1833. Re-elected in 1835. Re-elected in 1837. Retired.	1833–1843 [data missing]
Ratliff Boon (Boonville)	Democratic	March 4, 1837 – March 3, 1839	21st 22nd 23rd 24th 25th	Elected in 1828. Re-elected in 1831. Re-elected in 1833. Re-elected in 1835. Re-elected in 1837. Retired.	1833–1843 [data missing]
George H. Proffit (Petersburg)	Whig	March 4, 1839 – March 3, 1843	26th 27th	Elected in 1839. Re-elected in 1841. Retired.	1833–1843 [data missing]
Robert D. Owen (Laporte)	Democratic	March 4, 1843 – March 3, 1847	28th 29th	Elected in 1843. Re-elected in 1845. Lost re-election.	1843–1853 [data missing]
Elisha Embree (Princeton)	Whig	March 4, 1847 – March 3, 1849	30th	Elected in 1847. Lost re-election.	1843–1853 [data missing]
Nathaniel Albertson (Greenville)	Democratic	March 4, 1849 – March 3, 1851	31st	Elected in 1849. Lost renomination.	1843–1853 [data missing]
James Lockhart (Evansville)	Democratic	March 4, 1851 – March 3, 1853	32nd	Elected in 1851. Retired.	1843–1853 [data missing]
Smith Miller (Patoka)	Democratic	March 4, 1853 – March 3, 1857	33rd 34th	Elected in 1852. Re-elected in 1854. Retired.	1853–1863 [data missing]
James Lockhart (Evansville)	Democratic	March 4, 1857 – September 7, 1857	35th	Elected in 1856. Died.	1853–1863 [data missing]
Vacant		September 7, 1857 – December 7, 1857	35th		1853–1863 [data missing]
William E. Niblack (Vincennes)	Democratic	December 7, 1857 – March 3, 1861	35th 36th	Elected to finish Lockhart's term. Re-elected in 1858. Retired.	1853–1863 [data missing]
John Law (Evansville)	Democratic	March 4, 1861 – March 3, 1865	37th 38th	Elected in 1860. Re-elected in 1862. Retired.	1853–1863 [data missing]
John Law (Evansville)	Democratic	March 4, 1861 – March 3, 1865	37th 38th	Elected in 1860. Re-elected in 1862. Retired.	1863–1873 [data missing]
William E. Niblack (Vincennes)	Democratic	March 4, 1865 – March 3, 1875	39th 40th 41st 42nd 43rd	Elected in 1864. Re-elected in 1866. Re-elected in 1868. Re-elected in 1870. Re-elected in 1872. Retired.	1863–1873 [data missing]
William E. Niblack (Vincennes)	Democratic	March 4, 1865 – March 3, 1875	39th 40th 41st 42nd 43rd	Elected in 1864. Re-elected in 1866. Re-elected in 1868. Re-elected in 1870. Re-elected in 1872. Retired.	1873–1883 [data missing]
Benoni S. Fuller (Boonville)	Democratic	March 4, 1875 – March 3, 1879	44th 45th	Elected in 1874. Re-elected in 1876. Retired.	1873–1883 [data missing]
William Heilman (Evansville)	Republican	March 4, 1879 – March 3, 1883	46th 47th	Elected in 1878. Re-elected in 1880. Lost re-election.	1873–1883 [data missing]
John J. Kleiner (Evansville)	Democratic	March 4, 1883 – March 3, 1887	48th 49th	Elected in 1882. Re-elected in 1884. Lost renomination.	1883–1893 [data missing]
Alvin P. Hovey (Mount Vernon)	Republican	March 4, 1887 – January 17, 1889	50th	Elected in 1886. Resigned when elected Governor of Indiana.	1883–1893 [data missing]
Vacant		January 17, 1889 – January 29, 1889	50th		1883–1893 [data missing]
Francis B. Posey (Poseyville)	Republican	January 29, 1889 – March 3, 1889	50th	Elected to finish Hovey's term. Lost election to the next term.	1883–1893 [data missing]
William F. Parrett (Evansville)	Democratic	March 4, 1889 – March 3, 1893	51st 52nd	Elected in 1888. Re-elected in 1890. Retired.	1883–1893 [data missing]
Arthur H. Taylor (Petersburg)	Democratic	March 4, 1893 – March 3, 1895	53rd	Elected in 1892. Lost re-election.	1893–1903 [data missing]
James A. Hemenway (Boonville)	Republican	March 4, 1895 – March 3, 1905	54th 55th 56th 57th 58th	Elected in 1894. Re-elected in 1896. Re-elected in 1898. Re-elected in 1900. Re-elected in 1902. Re-elected in 1904, but resigned when elected U.S. Senator.	1893–1903 [data missing]
James A. Hemenway (Boonville)	Republican	March 4, 1895 – March 3, 1905	54th 55th 56th 57th 58th	Elected in 1894. Re-elected in 1896. Re-elected in 1898. Re-elected in 1900. Re-elected in 1902. Re-elected in 1904, but resigned when elected U.S. Senator.	1903–1913 [data missing]
Vacant		March 4, 1905 – May 16, 1905	59th		1903–1913 [data missing]
John H. Foster (Evansville)	Republican	May 16, 1905 – March 3, 1909	59th 60th	Elected to finish the vacant term. Re-elected in 1906. Lost re-election.	1903–1913 [data missing]
John W. Boehne (Evansville)	Democratic	March 4, 1909 – March 3, 1913	61st 62nd	Elected in 1908. Re-elected in 1910. Retired.	1903–1913 [data missing]
Charles Lieb (Rockport)	Democratic	March 4, 1913 – March 3, 1917	63rd 64th	Elected in 1912. Re-elected in 1914. Retired.	1913–1933 [data missing]
George K. Denton (Evansville)	Democratic	March 4, 1917 – March 3, 1919	65th	Elected in 1916. Lost re-election.	1913–1933 [data missing]
Oscar R. Luhring (Evansville)	Republican	March 4, 1919 – March 3, 1923	66th 67th	Elected in 1918. Re-elected in 1920. Lost re-election.	1913–1933 [data missing]
William E. Wilson (Evansville)	Democratic	March 4, 1923 – March 3, 1925	68th	Elected in 1922. Lost re-election.	1913–1933 [data missing]
Harry E. Rowbottom (Evansville)	Republican	March 4, 1925 – March 3, 1931	69th 70th 71st	Elected in 1924. Re-elected in 1926. Re-elected in 1928. Lost re-election.	1913–1933 [data missing]
John W. Boehne Jr. (Evansville)	Democratic	March 4, 1931 – March 3, 1933	72nd	Elected in 1930. Redistricted to the 8th district.	1913–1933 [data missing]
William T. Schulte (Hammond)	Democratic	March 4, 1933 – January 3, 1943	73rd 74th 75th 76th 77th	Elected in 1932. Re-elected in 1934. Re-elected in 1936. Re-elected in 1938. Re-elected in 1940. Lost renomination.	1933–1933 [data missing]
Ray J. Madden (Gary)	Democratic	January 3, 1943 – January 3, 1977	78th 79th 80th 81st 82nd 83rd 84th 85th 86th 87th 88th 89th 90th 91st 92nd 93rd 94th	Elected in 1942. Re-elected in 1944. Re-elected in 1946. Re-elected in 1948. Re-elected in 1950. Re-elected in 1952. Re-elected in 1954. Re-elected in 1956. Re-elected in 1958. Re-elected in 1960. Re-elected in 1962. Re-elected in 1964. Re-elected in 1966. Re-elected in 1968. Re-elected in 1970. Re-elected in 1972. Re-elected in 1974. Lost renomination.	1943–1953 [data missing]
Ray J. Madden (Gary)	Democratic	January 3, 1943 – January 3, 1977	78th 79th 80th 81st 82nd 83rd 84th 85th 86th 87th 88th 89th 90th 91st 92nd 93rd 94th	Elected in 1942. Re-elected in 1944. Re-elected in 1946. Re-elected in 1948. Re-elected in 1950. Re-elected in 1952. Re-elected in 1954. Re-elected in 1956. Re-elected in 1958. Re-elected in 1960. Re-elected in 1962. Re-elected in 1964. Re-elected in 1966. Re-elected in 1968. Re-elected in 1970. Re-elected in 1972. Re-elected in 1974. Lost renomination.	1953–1963 [data missing]
Ray J. Madden (Gary)	Democratic	January 3, 1943 – January 3, 1977	78th 79th 80th 81st 82nd 83rd 84th 85th 86th 87th 88th 89th 90th 91st 92nd 93rd 94th	Elected in 1942. Re-elected in 1944. Re-elected in 1946. Re-elected in 1948. Re-elected in 1950. Re-elected in 1952. Re-elected in 1954. Re-elected in 1956. Re-elected in 1958. Re-elected in 1960. Re-elected in 1962. Re-elected in 1964. Re-elected in 1966. Re-elected in 1968. Re-elected in 1970. Re-elected in 1972. Re-elected in 1974. Lost renomination.	1963–1973 [data missing]
Ray J. Madden (Gary)	Democratic	January 3, 1943 – January 3, 1977	78th 79th 80th 81st 82nd 83rd 84th 85th 86th 87th 88th 89th 90th 91st 92nd 93rd 94th	Elected in 1942. Re-elected in 1944. Re-elected in 1946. Re-elected in 1948. Re-elected in 1950. Re-elected in 1952. Re-elected in 1954. Re-elected in 1956. Re-elected in 1958. Re-elected in 1960. Re-elected in 1962. Re-elected in 1964. Re-elected in 1966. Re-elected in 1968. Re-elected in 1970. Re-elected in 1972. Re-elected in 1974. Lost renomination.	1973–1983 [data missing]
Adam Benjamin Jr. (Hobart)	Democratic	January 3, 1977 – September 7, 1982	95th 96th 97th	Elected in 1976. Re-elected in 1978. Re-elected in 1980. Ran for re-election, but died.	1973–1983 [data missing]
Vacant		September 7, 1982 – November 2, 1982	97th		1973–1983 [data missing]
Katie B. Hall (Gary)	Democratic	November 2, 1982 – January 3, 1985	97th 98th	Elected to finish Benjamin's term. Elected to full term in 1982. Lost renomination.	1973–1983 [data missing]
Katie B. Hall (Gary)	Democratic	November 2, 1982 – January 3, 1985	97th 98th	Elected to finish Benjamin's term. Elected to full term in 1982. Lost renomination.	1983–1993 [data missing]
Pete Visclosky (Merrillville)	Democratic	January 3, 1985 – January 3, 2021	99th 100th 101st 102nd 103rd 104th 105th 106th 107th 108th 109th 110th 111th 112th 113th 114th 115th 116th	Elected in 1984. Re-elected in 1986. Re-elected in 1988. Re-elected in 1990. Re-elected in 1992. Re-elected in 1994. Re-elected in 1996. Re-elected in 1998. Re-elected in 2000. Re-elected in 2002. Re-elected in 2004. Re-elected in 2006. Re-elected in 2008. Re-elected in 2010. Re-elected in 2012. Re-elected in 2014. Re-elected in 2016. Re-elected in 2018. Retired.	1983–1993 [data missing]
Pete Visclosky (Merrillville)	Democratic	January 3, 1985 – January 3, 2021	99th 100th 101st 102nd 103rd 104th 105th 106th 107th 108th 109th 110th 111th 112th 113th 114th 115th 116th	Elected in 1984. Re-elected in 1986. Re-elected in 1988. Re-elected in 1990. Re-elected in 1992. Re-elected in 1994. Re-elected in 1996. Re-elected in 1998. Re-elected in 2000. Re-elected in 2002. Re-elected in 2004. Re-elected in 2006. Re-elected in 2008. Re-elected in 2010. Re-elected in 2012. Re-elected in 2014. Re-elected in 2016. Re-elected in 2018. Retired.	1993–2003 [data missing]
Pete Visclosky (Merrillville)	Democratic	January 3, 1985 – January 3, 2021	99th 100th 101st 102nd 103rd 104th 105th 106th 107th 108th 109th 110th 111th 112th 113th 114th 115th 116th	Elected in 1984. Re-elected in 1986. Re-elected in 1988. Re-elected in 1990. Re-elected in 1992. Re-elected in 1994. Re-elected in 1996. Re-elected in 1998. Re-elected in 2000. Re-elected in 2002. Re-elected in 2004. Re-elected in 2006. Re-elected in 2008. Re-elected in 2010. Re-elected in 2012. Re-elected in 2014. Re-elected in 2016. Re-elected in 2018. Retired.	2003–2013
Pete Visclosky (Merrillville)	Democratic	January 3, 1985 – January 3, 2021	99th 100th 101st 102nd 103rd 104th 105th 106th 107th 108th 109th 110th 111th 112th 113th 114th 115th 116th	Elected in 1984. Re-elected in 1986. Re-elected in 1988. Re-elected in 1990. Re-elected in 1992. Re-elected in 1994. Re-elected in 1996. Re-elected in 1998. Re-elected in 2000. Re-elected in 2002. Re-elected in 2004. Re-elected in 2006. Re-elected in 2008. Re-elected in 2010. Re-elected in 2012. Re-elected in 2014. Re-elected in 2016. Re-elected in 2018. Retired.	2013–2023
Frank J. Mrvan (Highland)	Democratic	January 3, 2021 – present	117th 118th 119th	Elected in 2020. Re-elected in 2022. Re-elected in 2024. Re-elected in 2026.	2013–2023
Frank J. Mrvan (Highland)	Democratic	January 3, 2021 – present	117th 118th 119th	Elected in 2020. Re-elected in 2022. Re-elected in 2024. Re-elected in 2026.	2023–present

== History ==
=== 2010 redistricting ===
#	County	Seat	Population
89	Lake	Crown Point	498,700
127	Porter	Valparaiso	173,215

- 91 LaPorte County exists in both the 1st and 2nd Congressional districts. One city, La Porte, exists in the 1st and 2nd congressional districts, and two cities, Michigan City and New Durham, exist in the 1st congressional district. Five townships, Clinton, Clinton, Dewey, New Durham, and Springfield exists in the 1st congressional district, and eleven townships, Hanna, Hudson, Johnson, Lincoln, Noble, Pleasant, Prairie, Scipio, Union, Washington, and Wills exist in the 2nd congressional district.

As of 2021, Indiana's 1st congressional district is composed of Lake (pop. 496,005) and Porter (pop. 164,343) counties as well as part of LaPorte County (pop. 111,467), which is also partly within Indiana's 2nd district. Michigan City and five townships (Clinton, Coolspring, Dewey, New Durham, and Springfield) exist entirely in the 1st district. La Porte and eleven townships (Hanna, Hudson, Johnson, Lincoln, Noble, Pleasant, Prairie, Scipio, Union, Washington, and Wills) are split between the 1st and 2nd districts by Indiana West 500N and Indiana South/North 600W.

=== Cities of 10,000 or more people ===
- Hammond – 80,830
- Gary – 80,294
- Portage – 36,828
- Valparaiso – 31,730
- Michigan City – 31,479
- Crown Point – 27,317
- East Chicago – 29,698
- Hobart – 29,059
- Lake Station – 12,572

=== Towns of 10,000 or more people ===
- Cedar Lake – 11,560
- Dyer – 16,390
- Griffith – 16,893
- Highland – 23,727
- Merrillville – 35,246
- Munster – 23,603
- Schererville – 29,243
- St. John-14,850
- Chesterton – 13,068

=== 2,500 – 10,000 people ===
- Lowell – 9,276
- Winfield – 4,383
- Hebron – 3,724
- Porter – 4,858
- Westville – 5,853
- Whiting – 4,997

== Election results ==
General election 1824
Party	Candidate	Votes	%
Democratic	Ratliff Boon	4,281	42.1
Independent	Jacob Call	3,222	31.7
Anti-Jacksonian	Thomas H. Blake	2,661	26.2

General election 1826
Party	Candidate	Votes	%
Anti-Jacksonian	Thomas H. Blake	5,223	43.0
Democratic	Ratliff Boon	5,202	42.8
Independent	Lawrence S. Shuler	1,723	14.2

General election 1828
Party	Candidate	Votes	%
Democratic	Ratliff Boon	7,272	52.2
Anti-Jacksonian	Thomas H. Blake	6,671	47.8

General election 1831
Party	Candidate	Votes	%
Democratic	Ratliff Boon	11,280	50.9
Democratic	John Law	10,868	49.1

General election 1833
Party	Candidate	Votes	%
Democratic	Ratliff Boon	3,973	50.6
Independent	Dennis Pennington	1,120	14.3
Independent	Robert M. Evans	1,069	13.6
Independent	James R. E. Goodlet	788	10.0
Independent	Seth M. Levenworth	611	7.8

General election 1835
Party	Candidate	Votes	%
Democratic	Ratliff Boon	4,028	51.4
Whig	John G. Clendenin	3,815	48.6

General election 1837
Party	Candidate	Votes	%
Democratic	Ratliff Boon	4,534	50.4
Whig	John Pitcher	4,467	49.6

General election 1839
Party	Candidate	Votes	%
Whig	George H. Proffit	6,008	53.5
Democratic	Robert Dale Owen	5,229	46.5

General election 1841
Party	Candidate	Votes	%
Whig	Joseph Trumbull	5,142	57.1
Democratic	Thomas Seymour	3,867	42.9

General election 1843
Party	Candidate	Votes	%
Democratic	Robert Dale Owen	6,679	52.2
Whig	John W. Payne	6,127	47.8

General election 1845
Party	Candidate	Votes	%
Democratic	Robert Dale Owen	7,336	53.7
Whig	George P. R. Wilson	6,331	46.3

General election 1847
Party	Candidate	Votes	%
Whig	Elisha Embree	7,446	51.4
Democratic	Robert Dale Owen	7,054	48.7

General election 1849
Party	Candidate	Votes	%
Democratic	Nathaniel Albertson	8,271	52.1
Whig	Elisha Embree	7,598	47.9

General election 1851
Party	Candidate	Votes	%
Democratic	James Lockhart	8,173	51.0
Whig	Lemuel Debruler	7,855	49.0

General election 1852
Party	Candidate	Votes	%
Democratic	Smith Miller	9,007	59.0
Whig	Kea	9,007	51.0

General election 1854
Party	Candidate	Votes	%
Democratic	Smith Miller	9,864	52.2
Know Nothing	Hall	9,051	47.9

General election 1856
Party	Candidate	Votes	%
Democratic	James Lockhart	12,747	61.5
Republican	James C. Veatch	7,977	38.5

General election 1858
Party	Candidate	Votes	%
Democratic	William E. Niblack	10,329	53.6
Republican	Alvin P. Hovey	8,946	46.4

General election 1860
Party	Candidate	Votes	%
Democratic	John Law	13,476	55.7
Republican	Lemuel Debruler	10,731	44.3

General election 1862
Party	Candidate	Votes	%
Democratic	John Law	11,963	53.1
National Union	Johnson	10,583	46.9

General election 1864
Party	Candidate	Votes	%
Democratic	William E. Niblack	14,718	53.9
National Union	Cyrus M. Allen	12,616	46.2

General election 1866
Party	Candidate	Votes	%
Democratic	William E. Niblack	17,255	52.0
Republican	Lemuel Debruler	15,905	48.0

General election 1868
Party	Candidate	Votes	%
Democratic	William E. Niblack	18,116	52.1
Republican	James Veatch	16,631	47.9

General election 1870
Party	Candidate	Votes	%
Democratic	William E. Niblack	17,577	53.4
Republican	Hy C. Goodling	15,327	46.6

General election 1872
Party	Candidate	Votes	%
Democratic	William E. Niblack	19,259	50.2
Republican	Heilman	19,127	49.8

General election 1874
Party	Candidate	Votes	%
Democratic	Benoni S. Fuller	12,864	50.7
Republican	Heilman	12,527	49.3

General election 1876
Party	Candidate	Votes	%
Democratic	Benoni S. Fuller	14,727	50.6
Republican	C. A. Debruler	13,158	45.2

General election 1878
Party	Candidate	Votes	%
Republican	William Heilman	13,928	48.7
Democratic	Thomas E. Garvin	13,928	48.7
Greenback	Thomas F. Drebruler	1,595	5.6

General election 1880
Party	Candidate	Votes	%
Republican	William Heilman	17,719	49.4
Democratic	John Kleiner	17,420	48.6

General election 1882
Party	Candidate	Votes	%
Democratic	John Kleiner	18,048	51.6
Republican	William Heilman	16,399	46.9

General election 1884
Party	Candidate	Votes	%
Democratic	John J. Kleiner	19,930	51.5
Republican	William H. Gudgel	18,493	47.8

General election 1886
Party	Candidate	Votes	%
Republican	Alvin P. Hovey	18,258	49.0
Democratic	J. E. McCullough	16,901	45.4

General election 1888
Party	Candidate	Votes	%
Democratic	William F. Parrett	20,647	49.3
Republican	Frank B. Posey	20,627	49.3

General election 1890
Party	Candidate	Votes	%
Democratic	William F. Parrett	17,730	50.4
Republican	James S. Wright	16,875	48.0

General election 1892
Party	Candidate	Votes	%
Democratic	Arthur H. Taylor	19,720	47.4
Republican	A. P. Twineham	19,266	46.3
Populist	Moses Smith	2,110	5.1

General election 1894
Party	Candidate	Votes	%
Republican	James A. Hemenway	20,535	47.8
Democratic	Arthur H. Taylor	18,245	42.5
Populist	James A. Boyce	3,820	8.9

General election 1896
Party	Candidate	Votes	%
Republican	James A. Hemenway	21,807	49.6
Democratic	Thomas Duncan	20,856	47.4

General election 1898
Party	Candidate	Votes	%
Republican	James A. Hemenway	20,383	50.7
Democratic	Thomas Duncan	19,337	48.1

General election 1900
Party	Candidate	Votes	%
Republican	James A. Hemenway	22,262	49.7
Democratic	Alfred Dale Owen	22,060	49.3

General election 1902
Party	Candidate	Votes	%
Republican	James A. Hemenway	21,542	52.0
Democratic	John W. Spencer	17,833	43.1

General election 1904
Party	Candidate	Votes	%
Republican	James A. Hemenway	23,158	51.1
Democratic	Albert G. Holcomb	19,399	42.8

General election 1906
Party	Candidate	Votes	%
Republican	John H. Foster	20,278	50.0
Democratic	Gusatvus V. Menzies	18,959	46.7

General election 1908
Party	Candidate	Votes	%
Democratic	John W. Boehne	23,054	48.3
Republican	John H. Foster	22,965	48.1

General election 1910
Party	Candidate	Votes	%
Democratic	John W. Boehne	22,420	52.3
Republican	Francis B. Posey	18,606	43.4

\

General election 1912
Party	Candidate	Votes	%
Democratic	Charles Lieb	20,014	45.7
Republican	D.H. Ortmeyer	13,158	30.0
Progressive	Humphrey C. Heidt	6,022	13.7
Socialist	William H Rainey	3,737	8.5

General election 1914
Party	Candidate	Votes	%
Democratic	Charles Lieb	20,488	46.6
Republican	S. Wallace Cook	17,661	40.1
Progressive	U.H Seider	3,519	8.0

General election 1916
Party	Candidate	Votes	%
Democratic	George K. Denton	23,278	48.1
Republican	S. Wallace Cook	22,955	47.4

General election 1918
Party	Candidate	Votes	%
Republican	Oscar R. Luhring	20,440	52.0
Democratic	George K. Denton	18,837	48.0

General election 1920
Party	Candidate	Votes	%
Republican	Oscar R. Luhring	44,694	51.7
Democratic	William E. Wilson	36,834	42.6

General election 1922
Party	Candidate	Votes	%
Democratic	William E. Wilson	42,797	53.6
Republican	Oscar R. Luhring	36,835	44.9

General election 1924
Party	Candidate	Votes	%
Republican	Harry E. Rowbottom	48,203	52.1
Democratic	William E. Wilson	44,335	47.9

General election 1926
Party	Candidate	Votes	%
Republican	Harry E. Rowbottom	37,503	52.4
Democratic	William E. Wilson	34,061	47.6

General election 1928
Party	Candidate	Votes	%
Republican	Harry E. Rowbottom	49,013	50.8
Democratic	John W. Boehne Jr.	47,404	49.2

General election 1930
Party	Candidate	Votes	%
Democratic	John W. Boehne Jr.	46,836	53.9
Republican	Harry E. Rowbottom	40,015	46.1

General election 1932
Party	Candidate	Votes	%
Democratic	William T. Schulte	45,473	50.0
Republican	Oscar A. Ahlgren	42,575	46.8

General election 1934
Party	Candidate	Votes	%
Democratic	William T. Schulte	44,983	53.5
Republican	E. Miles Norton	38,531	45.9

General election 1936
Party	Candidate	Votes	%
Democratic	William T. Schulte	68,210	66.4
Republican	Fred F. Schultx	24,259	33.3

General election 1938
Party	Candidate	Votes	%
Democratic	William T. Schulte	56,630	54.9
Republican	M. Elliott Belshaw	46,370	45.0

General election 1940
Party	Candidate	Votes	%
Democratic	William T. Schulte	71,606	60.8
Republican	Elliot Belshaw	45,947	39.0

General election 1942
Party	Candidate	Votes	%
Democratic	Ray J. Madden	44,334	53.6
Republican	Samuel W. Cullison	38,450	48.5

General election 1944
Party	Candidate	Votes	%
Democratic	Ray J. Madden	75,635	61.3
Republican	Otto G. Fifield	46,969	38.1

General election 1946
Party	Candidate	Votes	%
Democratic	Ray J. Madden	51,809	51.9
Republican	Charles W. Gannon	46,677	48.8

General election 1948
Party	Candidate	Votes	%
Democratic	Ray J. Madden	78,898	60.7
Republican	Theodore L. Sendak	50,194	38.6

General election 1950
Party	Candidate	Votes	%
Democratic	Ray J. Madden	62,666	52.6
Republican	Paul Cyr	56,063	47.0

General election 1952
Party	Candidate	Votes	%
Democratic	Ray J. Madden	93,187	56.4
Republican	Elliot Belshaw	71,617	43.3

General election 1954
Party	Candidate	Votes	%
Democratic	Ray J. Madden	81,217	61.4
Republican	Robert H. More	50,439	38.2

General election 1956
Party	Candidate	Votes	%
Democratic	Ray J. Madden	93,658	52.6
Republican	Donald K. Stimson Jr.	84,125	47.2

General election 1958
Party	Candidate	Votes	%
Democratic	Ray J. Madden	95,801	66.4
Republican	Edward P. Keck	47,588	33.0

General election 1960
Party	Candidate	Votes	%
Democratic	Ray J. Madden	136,443	64.7
Republican	Phillip P. Parker	73,984	35.1

General election 1962
Party	Candidate	Votes	%
Democratic	Ray J. Madden	104,212	60.5
Republican	Harold Moody	67,230	39.0

General election 1964
Party	Candidate	Votes	%
Democratic	Ray J. Madden	133,089	63.7
Republican	Arthur Endres	75,226	36.0

General election 1966
Party	Candidate	Votes	%
Democratic	Ray J. Madden	71,040	58.3
Republican	Albert F. Harrigan	50,804	41.7

General election 1968
Party	Candidate	Votes	%
Democratic	Ray J. Madden	90,055	56.7
Republican	Donalrd E. Taylor	68,318	43.0

General election 1970
Party	Candidate	Votes	%
Democratic	Ray J. Madden	73,145	65.6
Republican	Eugene M. Kirtland	38,294	34.4

General election 1972
Party	Candidate	Votes	%
Democratic	Ray J. Madden	95,873	56.9
Republican	Bruce R. Haller	72,662	43.1

General election 1974
Party	Candidate	Votes	%
Democratic	Ray J. Madden	71,759	68.6
Republican	Joseph D. Harkin	32,793	31.4

General election 1976
Party	Candidate	Votes	%
Democratic	Adam Benjamin Jr.	121,155	71.3
Republican	Robert J. Billings	48,756	31.7

General election 1978
Party	Candidate	Votes	%
Democratic	Adam Benjamin Jr.	72,367	80.2%
Republican	Robert J. Billings	17,419	19.3
U.S. Labor	Christopher Martinson	384	0.4%

General election 1980
Party	Candidate	Votes	%
Democratic	Adam Benjamin Jr.	112,016	72.0%
Republican	Joseph Douglas Harkin	43,537	28.0%

=== 2002 ===
Indiana's 1st Congressional District election (2002)
Party	Candidate	Votes	%
Democratic	Pete Visclosky (incumbent)	90,443	66.94%
Republican	Mark J. Leyva	41,909	31.02%
Libertarian	Timothy P. Brennan	2,759	2.04%
Total votes		135,111	100.00%
Turnout			
Democratic hold			

=== 2004 ===
Indiana's 1st Congressional District election (2004)
Party	Candidate	Votes	%
Democratic	Pete Visclosky (incumbent)	178,406	68.29%
Republican	Mark J. Leyva	82,858	31.71%
Total votes		261,264	100.00%
Turnout			
Democratic hold			

=== 2006 ===
Indiana's 1st Congressional District election (2006)
Party	Candidate	Votes	%
Democratic	Pete Visclosky (incumbent)	104,195	69.65%
Republican	Mark J. Leyva	40,146	26.83%
Independent	Chuck Barman	5,266	3.52%
Total votes		149,607	100.00%
Turnout			
Democratic hold			

=== 2008 ===
Indiana's 1st Congressional District election (2008)
Party	Candidate	Votes	%
Democratic	Pete Visclosky (incumbent)	199,954	70.90%
Republican	Mark J. Leyva	76,647	27.18%
Libertarian	Jeff Duensing	5,421	1.92%
Total votes		282,022	100.00%
Turnout			
Democratic hold			

=== 2010 ===
Indiana's 1st Congressional District election (2010)
Party	Candidate	Votes	%
Democratic	Pete Visclosky (incumbent)	99,387	58.56%
Republican	Mark J. Leyva	65,558	38.63%
Libertarian	Jon Morris	4,762	2.81%
Total votes		169,707	100.00%
Turnout			
Democratic hold			

=== 2012 ===
Indiana's 1st Congressional District election (2012)
Party	Candidate	Votes	%
Democratic	Pete Visclosky (incumbent)	187,743	67.28%
Republican	Joel Phelps	91,291	32.72%
Total votes		279,034	100.00%
Turnout			
Democratic hold			

=== 2014 ===
Indiana's 1st Congressional District election (2014)
Party	Candidate	Votes	%
Democratic	Pete Visclosky (incumbent)	86,579	60.85%
Republican	Mark Leyva	51,000	35.84%
Libertarian	Donna Dunn	4,714	3.31%
Independent	James Johnson Jr. (Write-in)	0	0.00%
Total votes		142,293	100.00%
Democratic hold			

=== 2016 ===
Indiana's 1st Congressional District election (2016)
Party	Candidate	Votes	%
Democratic	Pete Visclosky (incumbent)	207,514	81.51%
Libertarian	Donna Dunn	47,051	18.48%
Independent	John Meyer	17	0.00%
Total votes		254,583	100.00%
Democratic hold			

=== 2018 ===
Indiana's 1st Congressional District election (2018)
Party	Candidate	Votes	%
Democratic	Pete Visclosky (incumbent)	159,611	65.1%
Republican	Mark Leyva	85,594	34.9%
Independent	Jonathan S. Kleinman (write-in)	4	0.0%
Total votes		245,209	100.0%
Democratic hold			

=== 2020 ===
Indiana's 1st Congressional District election (2020)
Party	Candidate	Votes	%
Democratic	Frank J. Mrvan	185,180	56.6%
Republican	Mark Leyva	132,247	40.5%
Libertarian	Edward Michael Strauss	9,521	2.9%
Total votes		326,948	100.0%
Democratic hold			

=== 2022 ===
Indiana's 1st Congressional District election (2022)
Party	Candidate	Votes	%
Democratic	Frank J. Mrvan	112,539	52.8%
Republican	Jennifer Ruth-Green	100,486	47.2%
Total votes		213,025	100.0%
Democratic hold			

=== 2024 ===
Indiana's 1st Congressional District election (2024)
Party	Candidate	Votes	%
Democratic	Frank J. Mrvan	172,467	53.4%
Republican	Randy Niemeyer	145,056	44.9%
Libertarian	Dakotah Miskus-Spencer	5,200	1.6
Total votes		322,723	100%
Democratic hold			

== See also ==
- Indiana's congressional districts
- List of United States congressional districts
