= John H. Foster (politician) =

American politician (1862–1917)

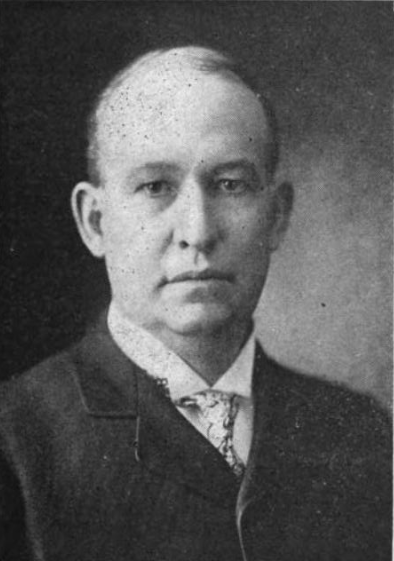

Member of the U.S. House of Representatives from Indiana's 1st district
- In office May 16, 1905 – March 3, 1909
- Preceded by: James A. Hemenway
- Succeeded by: John W. Boehne

Member of the Indiana House of Representatives
- In office 1893

Personal details
- Born: John Hopkins Foster; January 31, 1862 Evansville, Indiana, U.S.
- Died: September 5, 1917 (aged 55) Evansville, Indiana, U.S.
- Party: Republican
- Education: Indiana University Bloomington, George Washington University

John Hopkins Foster (January 31, 1862 – September 5, 1917) was an American lawyer and politician who served two terms as a U.S. representative from Indiana from 1905 to 1909.

== Early life and career ==
Born in Evansville, Indiana, Foster attended the common schools of his native city and was graduated from Indiana University Bloomington in 1882 and from the law department of Columbian University (now George Washington University), Washington, D.C., in 1884.

He was admitted to the bar in 1885 and commenced the practice of his profession in Evansville, Indiana.

== Political career ==
He served as member of the Indiana State House of Representatives in 1893. He served as judge of the superior court of Vanderburg County 1896–1905.

=== Congress ===
Foster was elected as a Republican to the Fifty-ninth Congress to fill the vacancy caused by the resignation of James A. Hemenway. He was reelected to the Sixtieth Congress and served from May 16, 1905, to March 3, 1909. He was an unsuccessful candidate for reelection in 1908 to the Sixty-first Congress.

== Later career and death ==
He resumed the practice of law in Evansville, Indiana, where he died September 5, 1917. He was interred in Oak Hill Cemetery.

U.S. House of Representatives
Preceded by James A. Hemenway	Member of the U.S. House of Representatives from Indiana's 1st congressional district 1905-1909	Succeeded by John W. Boehne
