= James A. Hemenway =

American politician (1860–1923)

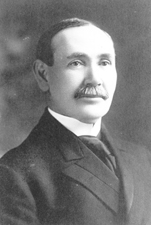

United States Senator from Indiana
- In office March 4, 1905 – March 3, 1909
- Preceded by: Charles W. Fairbanks
- Succeeded by: Benjamin F. Shively

Member of the U.S. House of Representatives from Indiana's 1st district
- In office March 4, 1895 – March 3, 1905
- Preceded by: Arthur H. Taylor
- Succeeded by: John H. Foster

Personal details
- Born: James Alexander Hemenway; March 8, 1860 Boonville, Indiana, U.S.
- Died: February 10, 1923 (aged 62) Miami, Florida, U.S.
- Resting place: Maple Grove Cemetery, Boonville
- Party: Republican

James Alexander Hemenway (March 8, 1860 – February 10, 1923) was an American lawyer and politician who served as a United States representative from 1895 to 1905, and Senator from Indiana from 1905 to 1909.

== Biography ==
Born in Boonville, Indiana, he attended the common schools, studied law, and was admitted to the bar, commencing practice in Boonville in 1885.

=== Early career ===
He was prosecuting attorney for the second judicial circuit of Indiana from 1886 to 1890.

=== U.S. House of Representatives ===
He was elected as a Republican to the Fifty-fourth and to the five succeeding Congresses and served from March 4, 1895, until his resignation, effective March 3, 1905, at the close of the Fifty-eighth Congress, having been elected Senator. While in the House of Representatives, he was chairman of the Committee on Appropriations (Fifty-eighth Congress).

=== U.S. Senate ===
Hemenway was elected to the U.S. Senate to fill the vacancy caused by the resignation of Charles W. Fairbanks and served from March 4, 1905, to March 3, 1909; he was an unsuccessful candidate for reelection. While in the Senate he was chairman of the Committee on University of the United States (Fifty-ninth and Sixtieth Congresses).

=== Later career ===
After the Senate, he resumed the practice of law in Boonville. He donated generously to the Old Presbyterian Church in Boonville, which his family had attended for generations.

=== Death and burial ===
He died in Miami, Florida; interment was in Maple Grove Cemetery, Boonville.

Hemenway is the namesake of the community of Hemenway, Missouri.

== Notes ==
- United States Congress. "James A. Hemenway (id: H000467)". Biographical Directory of the United States Congress.

U.S. House of Representatives
Preceded by Arthur H. Taylor	Member of the U.S. House of Representatives from Indiana's 1st congressional district 1895–1905	Succeeded by John H. Foster
U.S. Senate
Preceded by Charles W. Fairbanks	U.S. senator (Class 3) from Indiana; 1905–1909; Served alongside: Albert J. Beveridge	Succeeded by Benjamin F. Shively
