= John W. Boehne House =

Historic house in Indiana, United States

- U.S. National Register of Historic Places
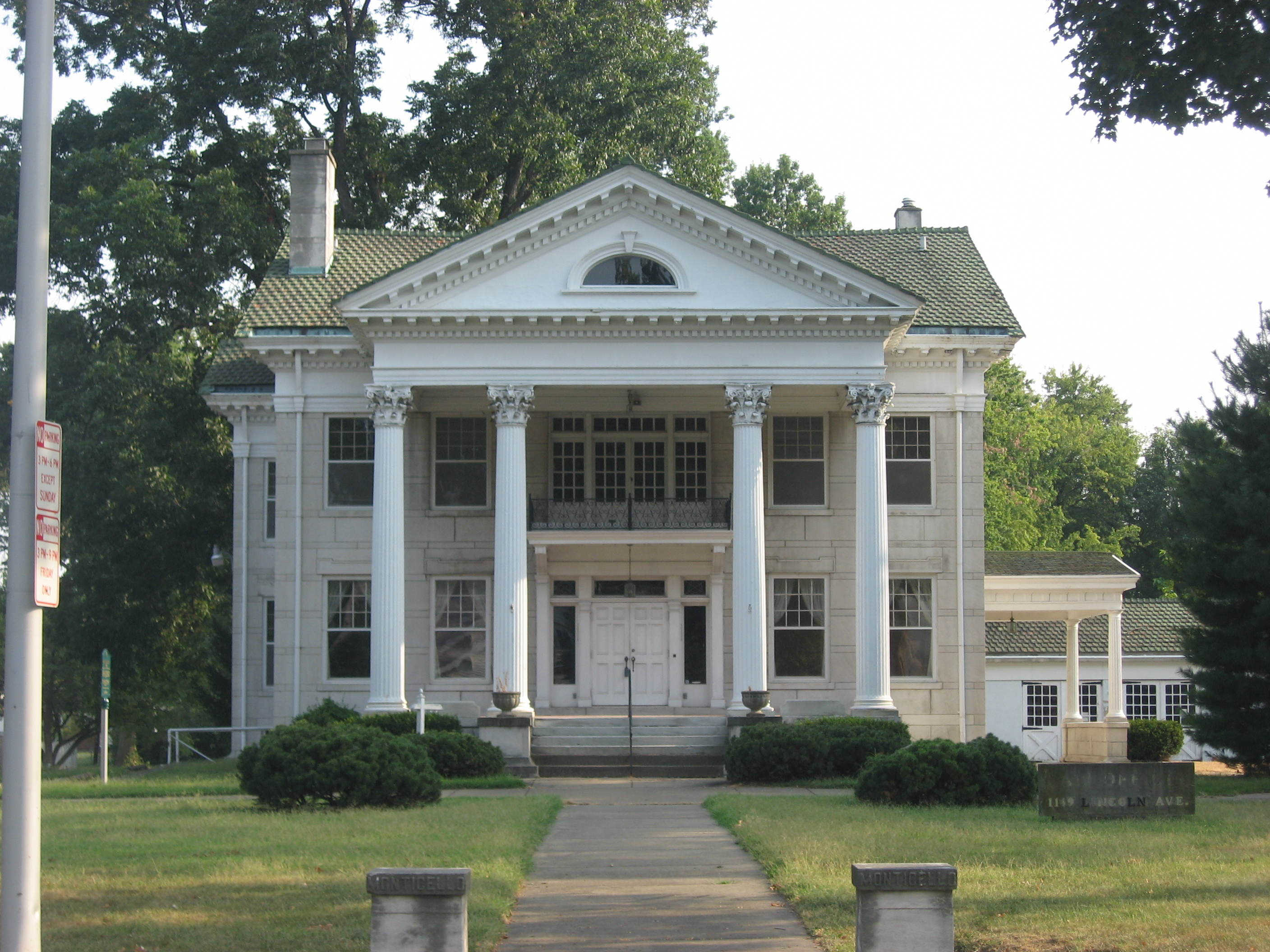
- John W. Boehne House, September 2011

- Location within Indiana Location within the United States
- Location: 1119 Lincoln Ave., Evansville, Indiana
- Coordinates: 37°58′12″N 87°32′40″W
- Area: 1.5 acres (0.61 ha)
- Built: 1912
- Architect: Shopbell, Clifford & Company; Bippus, Jacob & Sons
- Architectural style: Colonial Revival
- NRHP reference No.: 83000105
- Added to NRHP: February 17, 1983

John W. Boehne House, also known as the Tau Kappa Epsilon Fraternity House, is a historic home located at Evansville, Indiana. It was designed by the architecture firm Clifford Shopbell & Co. and built in 1912. It is a 2 1/2-story, Colonial Revival style stone sheathed dwelling. It features a monumental front pedimented portico. It was originally built for Congressman John W. Boehne (1856–1946) and has housed the Tau Kappa Epsilon since 1965. Tau Kappa Epsilon is no longer housed on the premises.

It was added to the National Register of Historic Places in 1983.
