= Nathaniel Albertson =

U.S. Representative

Member of the U.S. House of Representatives from Indiana's 1st district
- In office March 4, 1849 – March 3, 1851
- Preceded by: Elisha Embree
- Succeeded by: James Lockhart

Member of the Indiana House of Representatives
- In office 1838–1840

Personal details
- Born: June 10, 1800
- Died: December 16, 1863 (aged 63) Central City, Colorado
- Resting place: Central City Cemetery

Nathaniel Albertson (June 10, 1800 – December 16, 1863) was a 19th-century American politician who served one term as a U.S. representative from Indiana from 1849 to 1851.

== Biography ==
Born in Fairfax, Virginia, Albertson moved to Salem, Indiana, and engaged in agricultural pursuits. He served as member of the State House of Representatives from 1838 to 1840.

He moved to Floyd County in 1835 and settled in Greenville, near New Albany, and resumed agricultural pursuits.

=== Congress ===
Albertson was elected as a Democrat to the Thirty-first Congress (March 4, 1849 – March 3, 1851). As a congressman, he voted in favor of the Fugitive Slave Act. He was an unsuccessful candidate for reelection in 1850 to the Thirty-second Congress.

=== Later career and death ===
He resumed agricultural pursuits. He moved to Keokuk, Iowa, in 1853 and engaged in mercantile pursuits. He moved to Boonville, Missouri, in 1856 and continued mercantile pursuits. He settled in Central City, Colorado, in 1860 and engaged in the hotel business. He also became interested in mining.

He died in Central City, Colorado, December 16, 1863. He was interred in Central City Graveyard.

U.S. House of Representatives
Preceded by Elisha Embree	Member of the U.S. House of Representatives from Indiana's 1st congressional district 1849–1851	Succeeded by James Lockhart
