= Smith Miller =

American politician

Member of the U.S. House of Representatives from Indiana's 1st district
- In office March 4, 1853 – March 3, 1857
- Preceded by: James Lockhart
- Succeeded by: James Lockhart

Personal details
- Born: May 30, 1804 Charlotte, North Carolina, U.S.
- Died: May 21, 1872 (aged 67) Patoka, Indiana, U.S
- Resting place: Robb Cemetery
- Party: Democratic

Smith Miller (May 30, 1804 – March 21, 1872) was a U.S. representative from Indiana, serving two terms from 1853 to 1857.

== Biography ==
Born near Charlotte, North Carolina, Miller moved to Gibson County, Indiana, with his parents who settled in Patoka in 1813. He received a limited schooling and engaged in agricultural pursuits.

=== Early political career ===
He served as member of the Indiana House of Representatives from 1835 to 1839 and in 1846, and in the Indiana State Senate from 1841 to 1844 and from 1847 1850. He served as delegate to the state constitutional convention in 1850.

=== Congress ===
Miller was elected as a Democrat to the Thirty-third and Thirty-fourth Congresses (March 4, 1853 – March 3, 1857).

=== Later career ===
After his congressional service, he resumed agricultural pursuits, and served as delegate to the Democratic National Convention at Charleston, South Carolina, in 1860.

=== Death and burial ===
He died near Patoka, Indiana, March 21, 1872, and was interred in Robb Cemetery.

== Electoral results ==
General election 1852
Party	Candidate	Votes	%
Democratic	Smith Miller	9,007	59.0
Whig	Kea	9,007	51.0

General election 1854
Party	Candidate	Votes	%
Democratic	Smith Miller	9,864	52.2
Know Nothing	Hall	9,051	47.9

U.S. House of Representatives
Preceded by James Lockhart	Member of the U.S. House of Representatives from Indiana's 1st congressional district March 4, 1853 – March 3, 1857	Succeeded by James Lockhart
