= Arthur H. Taylor =

Canada-born American politician (1852–1922)

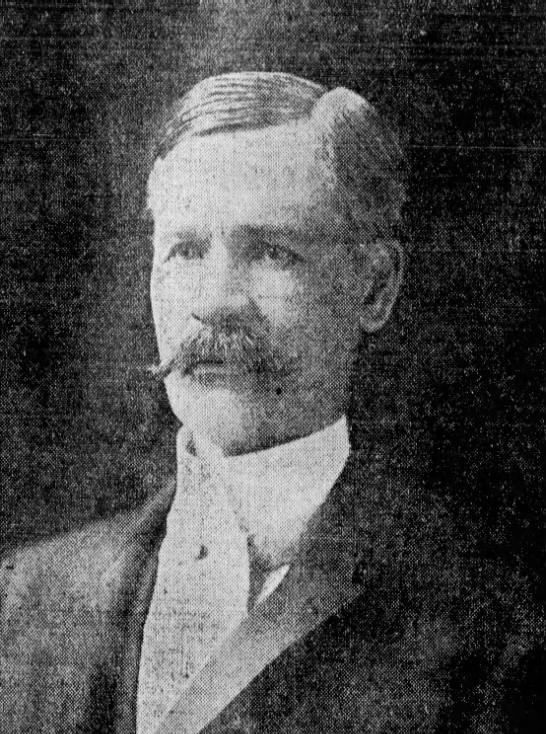

Member of the U.S. House of Representatives from Indiana's 1st district
- In office March 4, 1893 – March 3, 1895
- Preceded by: William F. Parrett
- Succeeded by: James A. Hemenway

Personal details
- Born: Arthur Herbert Taylor Caledonia Springs, Ontario, Canada
- Died: February 20, 1922 (aged 69)
- Resting place: Walnut Hill Cemetery

Arthur Herbert Taylor (February 29, 1852 – February 20, 1922) was an American lawyer and politician who served one term as a U.S. representative from Indiana from 1893 to 1895.

== Biography ==
Born at Caldonia Springs, Canada West, Taylor moved with his parents to Yates County, New York, in 1856. He attended the local school. He taught school for several years, and then moved to Indianapolis, Indiana in 1869 to study law.

=== Early career ===
He was admitted to the bar in 1873 and commenced practice in Indianapolis, Indiana. He moved to Petersburg, Indiana, in 1874 and continued the practice of law. He served as prosecuting attorney for the eleventh judicial circuit of Indiana from 1880 to 1884.

=== Congress ===
Taylor was elected as a Democrat to the Fifty-third Congress (March 4, 1893 – March 3, 1895). He was an unsuccessful candidate for reelection in 1894 to the Fifty-fourth Congress.

=== Later career and death ===
He resumed the practice of law in Petersburg, Indiana, until his death February 20, 1922. He was interred in Walnut Hill Cemetery.

U.S. House of Representatives
Preceded by William F. Parrett	Member of the U.S. House of Representatives from Indiana's 1st congressional district March 4, 1893 – March 3, 1895	Succeeded by James A. Hemenway
