= Fish Lake, Indiana =

- Census-designated place
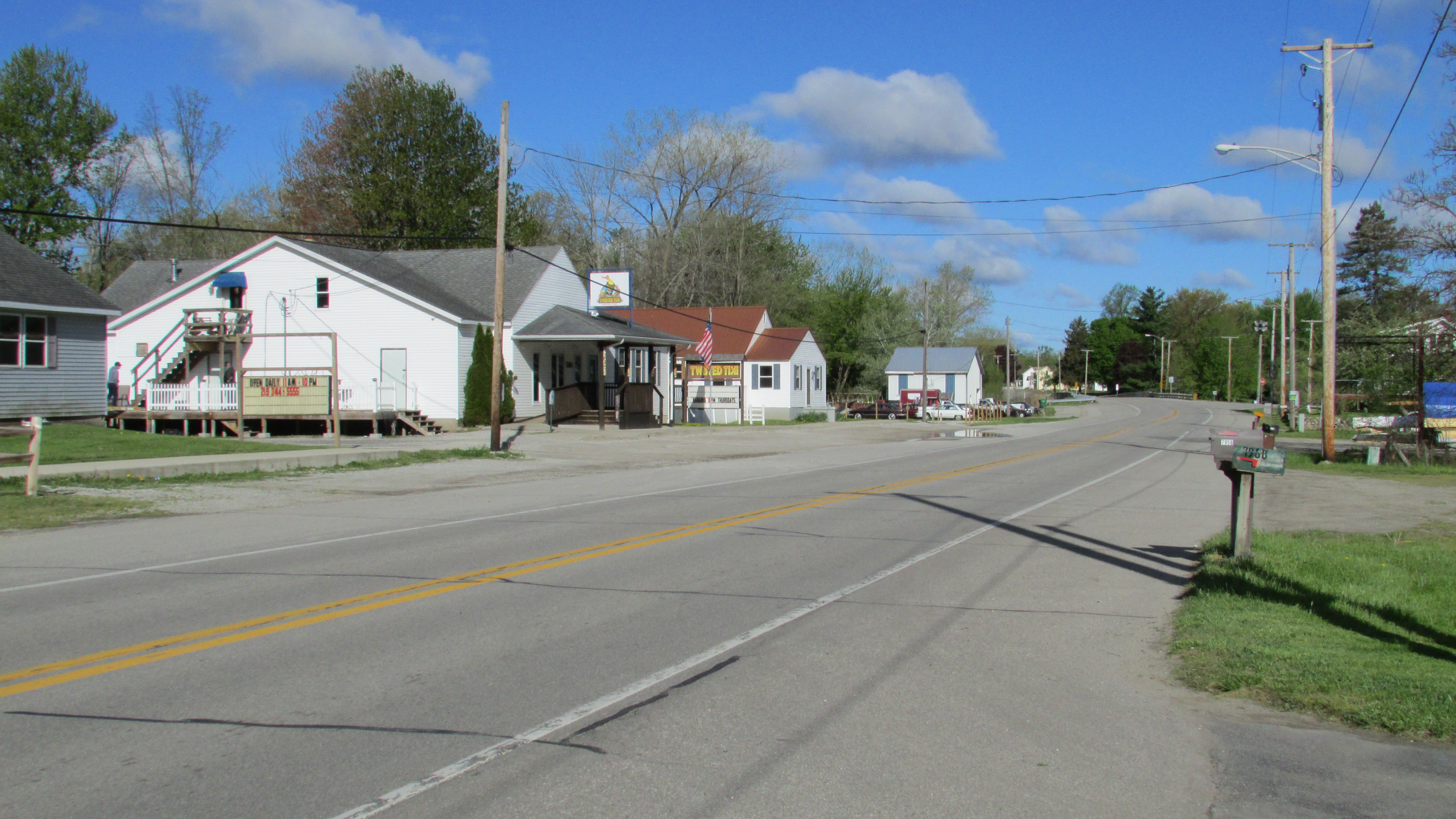
- Indiana Route 4 in Fish Lake, Indiana.

- Location in LaPorte County, Indiana

- Location within Indiana Location within the United States
- Coordinates: 41°33′42″N 86°33′05″W
- Country: United States
- State: Indiana
- County: LaPorte
- Township: Lincoln

Area
  - Total: 1.88 sq mi (4.88 km^{2})
  - Land: 1.54 sq mi (3.99 km^{2})
  - Water: 0.34 sq mi (0.89 km^{2})
- Elevation: 689 ft (210 m)

Population (2020)
  - Total: 1,052
  - Density: 683/sq mi (263.6/km^{2})
- 1016
- ZIP code: 46574
- FIPS code: 18-23386
- GNIS feature ID: 2629780

Fish Lake is an unincorporated community and census-designated place in Lincoln Township, LaPorte County, Indiana, United States. It is located where Indiana State Road 4 passes between Upper Fish Lake and Lower Fish Lake. These lakes feed the Kankakee River. As of the 2020 census, Fish Lake had a population of 1,052.

== Geography ==
Fish Lake is located in eastern LaPorte County in the center of Lincoln Township. The community surrounds Lower Fish Lake and covers the north, west, and south sides of Upper Fish Lake. Mill Creek, the lakes' outlet, flows south to the Little Kankakee River and then shortly to the Kankakee River, a west-flowing waterway that is a primary tributary of the Illinois River.

Indiana State Road 4 passes through the community, between the two lakes, and leads northwest 10 miles (16 km) to La Porte, the county seat, and southeast 7 miles (11 km) to North Liberty. Fish Lake is 20 miles (32 km) southwest of South Bend.

According to the U.S. Census Bureau, the Fish Lake CDP has a total area of 1.9 square miles (4.9 km^{2}), of which 1.5 square miles (4.0 km^{2}) are land and 0.3 square miles (0.9 km^{2}), or 18.24%, are water.

== Demographics ==
Historical population
| Census | Pop. | Note | %± |
|---|---|---|---|
| 2020 | 1,052 | | — |
U.S. Decennial Census

=== 2020 census ===
As of the 2020 census, Fish Lake had a population of 1,052. The median age was 50.1 years. 18.5% of residents were under the age of 18 and 24.2% of residents were 65 years of age or older. For every 100 females there were 116.0 males, and for every 100 females age 18 and over there were 117.5 males age 18 and over.

0.0% of residents lived in urban areas, while 100.0% lived in rural areas.

There were 451 households in Fish Lake, of which 22.8% had children under the age of 18 living in them. Of all households, 48.3% were married-couple households, 23.5% were households with a male householder and no spouse or partner present, and 19.3% were households with a female householder and no spouse or partner present. About 31.5% of all households were made up of individuals and 14.2% had someone living alone who was 65 years of age or older.

There were 644 housing units, of which 30.0% were vacant. The homeowner vacancy rate was 2.1% and the rental vacancy rate was 6.6%.

Racial composition as of the 2020 census
| Race | Number | Percent |
|---|---|---|
| White | 967 | 91.9% |
| Black or African American | 7 | 0.7% |
| American Indian and Alaska Native | 2 | 0.2% |
| Asian | 0 | 0.0% |
| Native Hawaiian and Other Pacific Islander | 0 | 0.0% |
| Some other race | 8 | 0.8% |
| Two or more races | 68 | 6.5% |
| Hispanic or Latino (of any race) | 35 | 3.3% |

== History ==
Before the draining of the Grand Kankakee Marsh, the body of water at Fish Lake was known in French as Lac Tipiconeau. It was then located on the main stream of the Kankakee, just upstream of its confluence with Potato Creek. The lake took its name from the French term for buffalo fish, and this name in turn likely led to the modern English name "Fish Lake".

In 1702, Pierre Le Moyne d'Iberville noted that following the end of the Beaver Wars a group of Miami people had settled at "Atihipi-Catouy". According to linguist Michael McCafferty this name "appears to be a gnarled form of Miami-Illinois kiteepihkwanonki, 'at the buffalo fish'", referring to Lac Tipiconeau.

In the 1880s, the Swift & Co. ice company of Chicago purchased land around Upper and Lower Fish Lake and carried out ice harvesting in the winter months. By 1899 Swift & Co. was shipping 18 railroad cars full of ice from Fish Lake to Chicago each day. Ice harvesting ceased here in 1930.
