= Elisha Embree =

American politician

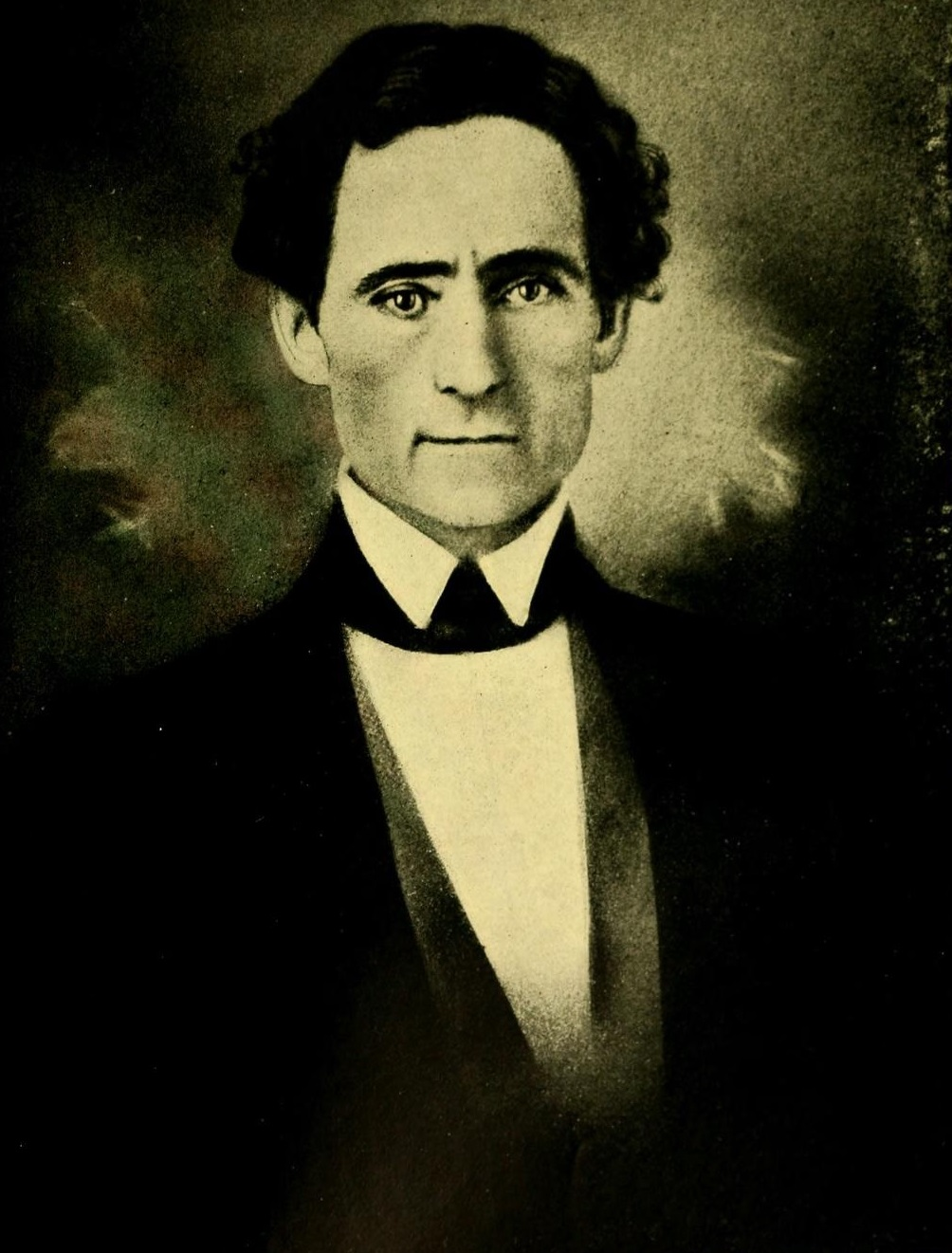

Member of the U.S. House of Representatives from Indiana's 1st district
- In office March 4, 1847 – March 4, 1849
- Preceded by: Robert D. Owen
- Succeeded by: Nathaniel Albertson

Personal details
- Born: September 28, 1801 Lincoln County, Kentucky, U.S.
- Died: February 28, 1863 (aged 61) Princeton, Indiana, U.S
- Party: Whig

Elisha Embree (September 28, 1801 – February 28, 1863) was a U.S. representative from Indiana.

Born in Lincoln County, Kentucky, Embree moved to Indiana in 1811 with his father, who settled in Knox (now Gibson) County, near where Princeton was subsequently located. He received limited schooling. He engaged in agricultural pursuits. He studied law. He was admitted to the bar in 1836 and commenced practice in Princeton, Indiana. Circuit judge for the fourth circuit of Indiana 1835–1845. He was nominated as the Whig candidate for Governor of Indiana in 1849, but declined, preferring to run for Congress.

Embree was elected as a Whig to the Thirtieth Congress (March 4, 1847 – March 3, 1849). He was an unsuccessful candidate for reelection in 1848 to the Thirty-first Congress. He resumed the practice of law and also interested in farming. He died in Princeton, Indiana, February 28, 1863. He is interred in Warnock Cemetery.

U.S. House of Representatives
Preceded by Robert D. Owen	Member of the U.S. House of Representatives from Indiana's 1st congressional district 1847–1849	Succeeded by Nathaniel Albertson
