= Walnut Hill Cemetery (Petersburg, Indiana) =

Historic cemetery in Pike County, Indiana

Coordinates: 38°30′04″N 87°17′22″W

- Interactive map of Walnut Hill Cemetery

Details
- Location: Petersburg, Indiana

Walnut Hill Cemetery is a cemetery in Petersburg, Indiana, less than a mile south of the lower portion of the White River. It is sometimes called Walnut Hills Cemetery.

Notable people interred there include George H. Proffit (1807–1847), Arthur H. Taylor (1852–1922), Francis Blackburn Posey (1848–1915) and Walter E. Treanor.

In 1913, a "Soldiers' and sailors' monument" was erected in Walnut Hill Cemetery, dedicated to the memory of service members from Pike County, Indiana who served in the American Civil War.
