= James Lockhart (Indiana politician) =

American politician

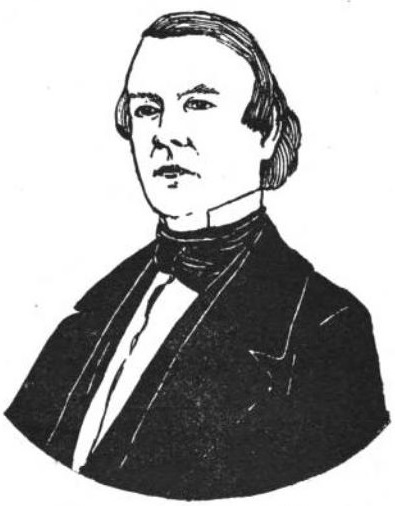

Member of the U.S. House of Representatives from Indiana's 1st district
- In office March 4, 1857 – September 7, 1857
- Preceded by: Smith Miller
- Succeeded by: William E. Niblack

Member of the U.S. House of Representatives from Indiana's 1st district
- In office March 4, 1851 – March 3, 1853
- Preceded by: Nathaniel Albertson
- Succeeded by: Smith Miller

Personal details
- Born: February 13, 1806 Auburn, New York, U.S.
- Died: September 7, 1857 (aged 51) Evansville, Indiana, U.S
- Party: Democratic

James Lockhart (February 13, 1806 – September 7, 1857) was an American lawyer and politician who served one term politician as a United States representative from Indiana from 1851 to 1853, then again in 1857.

== Biography ==
He was born in Auburn, New York where he attended the public schools. Later, he moved to Ithaca, New York about 1826 and operated a woolen mill. He moved to Indiana in 1832 and studied law. He was admitted to the bar in 1832 and commenced practice in Evansville, Indiana in 1834.

Lockhart was the city clerk in 1836 and 1837 and the prosecuting attorney of Vanderburg County, Indiana 1841–1845. He served as judge of the fourth judicial district from 1846 until 1851, when he resigned. He was a delegate to the Indiana constitutional convention in 1850.

=== Congress ===
Lockhart was elected as a Democrat to the Thirty-second Congress (March 4, 1851 – March 3, 1853) but was not a candidate for reelection in 1852 to the Thirty-third Congress.

=== Later career and death ===
After leaving Congress, he resumed the practice of his profession in Evansville, Indiana. He was appointed by President Franklin Pierce superintendent of construction of the marine hospital at Evansville in 1853.

He was elected to the Thirty-fifth Congress and served from March 4, 1857, until his death in Evansville, Indiana on September 7, 1857. He was buried in Oak Hill Cemetery.

== See also ==
- List of members of the United States Congress who died in office (1790–1899)

U.S. House of Representatives
Preceded by Nathaniel Albertson	Member of the U.S. House of Representatives from Indiana's 1st congressional district 1851–1853	Succeeded by Smith Miller
Preceded by Smith Miller	Member of the U.S. House of Representatives from Indiana's 1st congressional district 1857	Succeeded by William E. Niblack
