= Harry E. Rowbottom =

American politician (1884–1934)

Harry Rowbottom
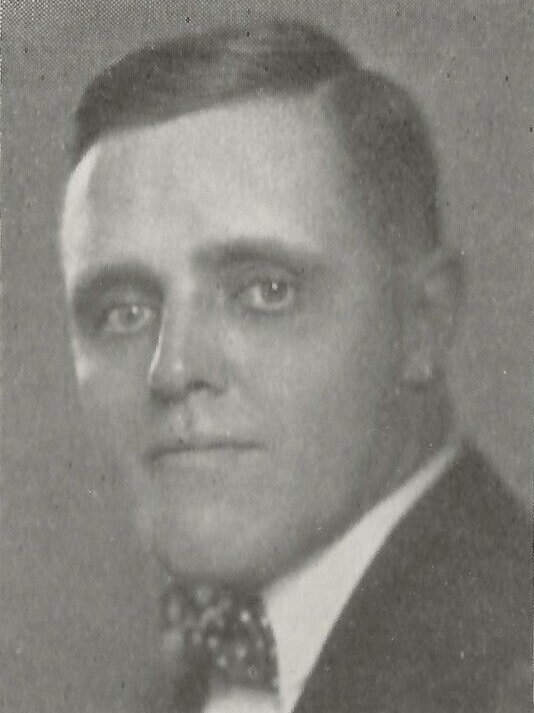

Member of the U.S. House of Representatives from Indiana's 1st district
- In office March 4, 1925 – March 3, 1931
- Preceded by: William Wilson
- Succeeded by: John W. Boehne Jr.

Member of the Indiana House of Representatives
- In office 1919–1923

Personal details
- Born: Harry Emerson Rowbottom; November 3, 1884 Aurora, Indiana, U.S.
- Died: March 22, 1934 (aged 49) Evansville, Indiana, U.S.
- Party: Republican
- Education: University of Kentucky; Cincinnati Business College (BS)

Harry Emerson Rowbottom (November 3, 1884 – March 22, 1934) was an American businessman and Republican politician. He was elected to the United States House of Representatives from Indiana in 1924 and served three terms from 1925 to 1931. He was defeated for re-election in 1930 and subsequently convicted of accepting bribes, abruptly terminating his political career.

== Biography ==
Rowbottom was born in Aurora, Indiana, and moved with his parents to Ludlow, Kentucky, in 1885. In Kentucky he attended the common schools, graduated from Ludlow High School in 1901, and subsequently attended Kentucky State College at Lexington from 1902 to 1904.

From 1904 to 1907, Rowbottom worked selling lubricating oils. He graduated from the Cincinnati Business College in 1907, where he studied accountancy. Following graduation, Rowbottom found work as an auditor in Cincinnati from 1907 to 1910 and Chicago from 1910 to 1912. He moved to Evansville, Indiana, in 1913 and was employed as chief clerk for the Indiana Refining Company from 1913 to 1918.

== Politics ==
Rowbottom was elected to the Indiana House of Representatives in 1918, serving two consecutive terms from 1919 to 1923. His legislative service coincided with the end of World War I and the Red Summer of 1919, which witnessed the rise of the second Ku Klux Klan. Like many prominent Indiana Republicans, Rowbottom sought out the Klan's electoral support and proudly boasted of his membership in the organization.

=== Congress ===
With the Klan's endorsement he was elected to the United States House of Representatives in 1924, defeating Democratic incumbent William E. Wilson in Indiana's 1st congressional district. Klan-backed candidates won up and down the ballot in 1924, with local Klan leader D. C. Stephenson widely believed to have orchestrated the nomination of the incoming Republican governor, Edward L. Jackson. Rowbottom's victory in traditionally Democratic southern Indiana, coming despite Wilson's eminent public stature and Rowbottom's comparatively poor reputation, was considered as major upset.

Rowbottom was re-elected in 1926 and 1928, serving from 1925 to 1931. He was defeated for re-election to the 72nd Congress in 1930 following the onset of the Great Depression, which was blamed on the Republican Party and the administration of Herbert Hoover.

=== Conviction and prison ===
During his final term in office, Rowbottom was indicted for accepting bribes in exchange for appointments to jobs with the United States Postal Service. He was found guilty in 1931 and sentenced to one year and one day in prison. Rowbottom was incarcerated at USP Leavenworth.

== Death ==
He died in Evansville on March 22, 1934, and is interred in Locust Hill Cemetery.

== Electoral history ==
General election 1924
Party	Candidate	Votes	%
Republican	Harry E. Rowbottom	48,203	52.1
Democratic	William E. Wilson	44,335	47.9

General election 1926
Party	Candidate	Votes	%
Republican	Harry E. Rowbottom	37,503	52.4
Democratic	William E. Wilson	34,061	47.6

General election 1928
Party	Candidate	Votes	%
Republican	Harry E. Rowbottom	49,013	50.8
Democratic	John W. Boehne Jr.	47,404	49.2

General election 1930
Party	Candidate	Votes	%
Democratic	John W. Boehne Jr.	46,836	53.9
Republican	Harry E. Rowbottom	40,015	46.1

== See also ==
- List of American federal politicians convicted of crimes
- List of federal political scandals in the United States

U.S. House of Representatives
Preceded by William Wilson	Member of the U.S. House of Representatives from Indiana's 1st congressional district 1925–1931	Succeeded by John W. Boehne Jr.
