= William E. Wilson (writer) =

American writer (1906–1988)

- Born: 1906
- Died: 1988 (aged 81–82); Indiana
- Occupation: author

William E. Wilson (1906–1988) was an American writer. He wrote eleven books, including The Wabash, and was a professor of fiction writing and literature at Indiana University from 1950 to 1972.

== Biography ==
William E. Wilson was born in 1906, the son of William E. Wilson, who served as a member of Congress. The younger Wilson spent much of his childhood in or around Evansville, Indiana. He graduated from Harvard University, served as a lieutenant commander in the U.S. Navy, and spent two years as a Fulbright Scholar at Aix-Marseille University, Grenoble and Nice, France before landing at Baltimore, Maryland where he became Assistant Editor of the Baltimore Sun.

In 1950, he left the Baltimore Sun, joining the faculty of Indiana University where he became a professor of fiction writing and literature until his retirement in 1972. Indiana University has a William E. Wilson Fellowship in Fiction named in his honor.

== Recognition ==
He was a Fulbright Lecturer in France from 1956 to 1957 and, in 1964, received an Award of Merit from the American Association of State and Local History. He was honored a number of times with the Indiana Author's Day Award. He was recognized in 1962 by the Southeastern Theatre Association for his plays.

== Family ==
His first wife, Ellen Janet Cameron, died in 1976. He had three sons with her. He married Hana Benes in 1977.

== Death ==
Wilson died in 1988 at the age of 82 in Bloomington Hospital in Indiana from cancer.

== Bibliography ==
=== Non-fiction ===
- The Wabash, Rivers of America Series; Farrar & Rinehart, New York; 1940
- Big Knife: The Life of John Rogers Clark, Farrar & Rinehart, New York; 1941
- On the Sunny Side of a One Way Street: Humorous Impressions of a Hoosier Boyhood, W.W. Norton, New York, 1958
- The Angel and the Serpent: The Story of New Harmony, Indiana University Press, Bloomington, Indiana, 1964
- Indiana: A History, Indiana University Press, Bloomington, Indiana, 1966

=== Fiction ===
- Crescent City, Simon & Schuster, New York, 1947
- The Strangers, McGraw-Hill, New York, 1952
- The Raiders, Rinehart & Company, New York; 1955
- Everyman Is My Father, Saturday Review Press, New York, 1973

=== Children’s ===
- Shooting Star: The Story of Tecumseh, Farrar & Rinehart, New York; 1942
- Abe Lincoln of Pigeon Creek, McGraw-Hill, New York, 1949

== Sources ==
- American Book Exchange
- University of Indiana
- Indiana Authors
