= John Adams Posey =

John Adams Posey (1889–1963) was an attorney and political figure in Indiana.

Posey served as Judge of the Perry-Spencer Circuit Court, and as Prosecuting Attorney after serving as a pilot in the Army Air Corps during World War I. His family was prominent in southern Indiana politics for more than a century: He was the son of Francis B. Posey, grandson of John Wesley Posey, and a distant relative of General Thomas Posey.
