= William E. Wilson (Indiana politician) =

American politician (1870–1948)

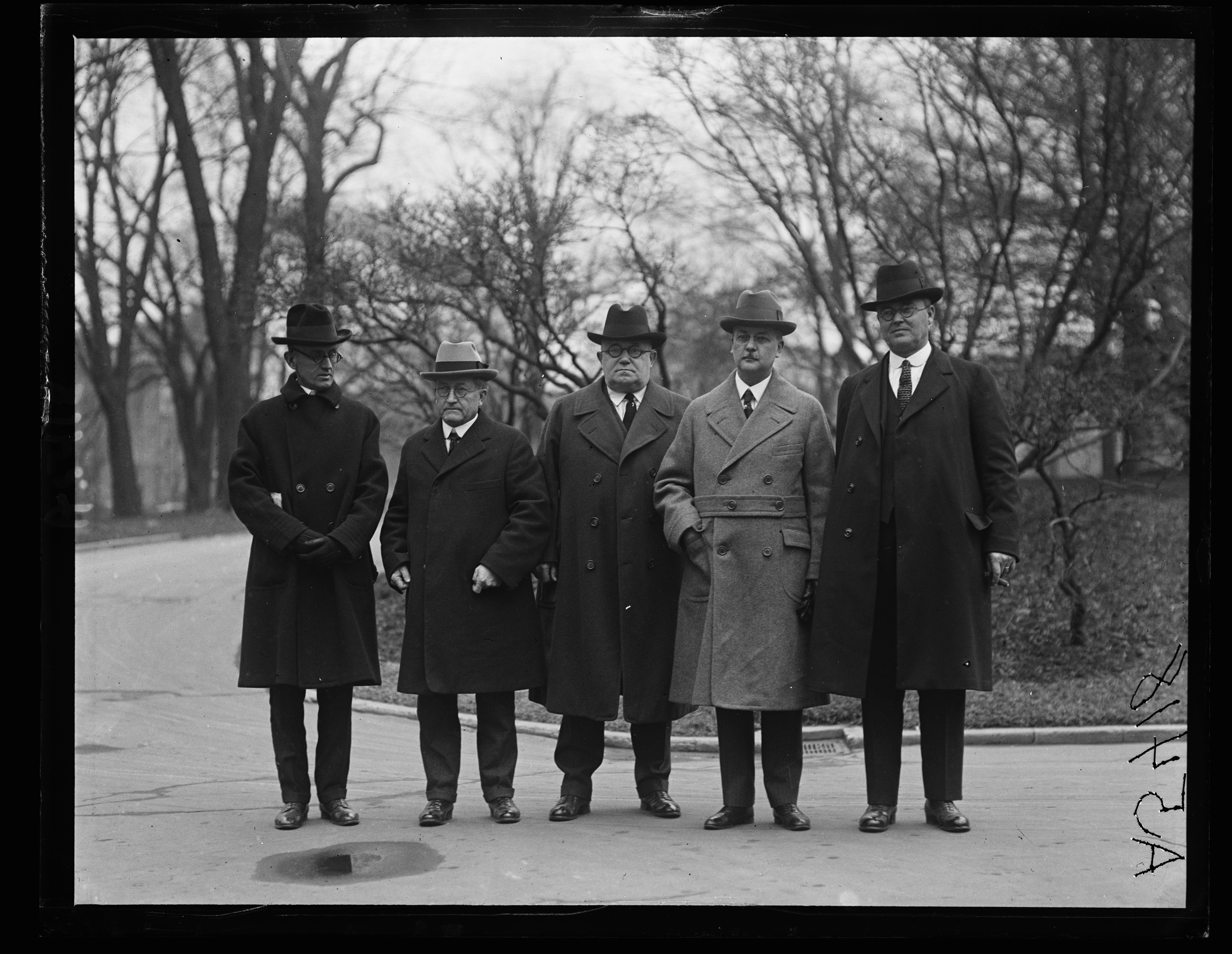
- Wilson (2nd from right)

Member of the U.S. House of Representatives from Indiana's 1st district
- In office March 4, 1923–March 3, 1925
- Preceded by: Oscar R. Luhring
- Succeeded by: Harry E. Rowbottom

Personal details
- Born: William Edward Wilson; March 9, 1870 Mount Vernon, Indiana, U.S.
- Died: September 29, 1948 (aged 78) Evansville, Indiana, U.S.
- Resting place: Oak Hill Cemetery
- Party: Democratic
- Spouse: Nettie Cook (m. 1900)
- Education: Evansville Commercial College
- Profession: Educator; Insurance broker Public official

William Edward Wilson (March 9, 1870 – September 29, 1948) was an American educator, businessman, and politician from Indiana. He served one term in the United States House of Representatives (1923–1925).

== Early life and education ==
Born in Mount Vernon, Indiana, Wilson was the son of Jay W. Wilson (1819–1893) and Mary (Chaffin) Wilson (1832–1925). He attended the public schools of Posey County and Evansville Commercial College.

== Career ==
Wilson began his career as a teacher at the Evansville Commercial College. He later purchased the school and served as principal from 1888 to 1904. After retiring from the school, Wilson worked as an accountant for a wholesale hardware company and secretary-treasurer of the Evansville insurance business run by his wife's family.

=== Politics ===
He served as deputy auditor of Vanderburgh County, Indiana from 1910 to 1912, and clerk of the circuit court of Vanderburg County from 1912 to 1920. He was an unsuccessful candidate for election in 1920 to the Sixty-seventh Congress.

Wilson was elected as a Democrat to the Sixty-eighth Congress (March 4, 1923 – March 3, 1925). He was an unsuccessful candidate for reelection in 1924 to the Sixty-ninth Congress. Wilson's unsuccessful race for reelection, during which the Ku Klux Klan actively opposed him, was later chronicled by his son in an article for American Heritage magazine.

After leaving Congress, Wilson was president of the Lincoln Savings Bank, and he was later employed by Chrysler.

== Personal life ==
In 1900, Wilson married Nettie Cook (1874–1945), the daughter of Stephen H. S. and Esther (Jarvis) Cook. They were the parents of two children, including author and college professor William E. Wilson (1906–1988).

He died in Evansville, Indiana, September 29, 1948. He was interred in Oak Hill Cemetery.

== Sources ==
=== Magazines ===
- Wilson, William E. (August 1, 1965). "Long, Hot Summer In Indiana". American Heritage. New York, NY: American Heritage Publishing Company.

=== Books ===
- Spencer, Thomas E. (1998). Where They're Buried. Baltimore, MD: Clearfield Company. p. 178. ISBN 978-0-8063-4823-0.
- U.S. Congress (1925). Official Congressional Directory. Washington, DC: US Government Printing Office.

=== Newspapers ===
- "William E. Wilson, Ex-Congressman, Dies". Palladium-Item. Richmond, IN. Associated Press. September 30, 1948 – via Newspapers.com.

== External sources ==
- United States Congress. "William E. Wilson (id: W000621)". Biographical Directory of the United States Congress.

U.S. House of Representatives
Preceded by Oscar R. Luhring	Member of the U.S. House of Representatives from Indiana's 1st congressional district 1923–1925	Succeeded by Harry E. Rowbottom
