= John Wesley Posey =

American abolitionist

For entries on other people named John Wesley, see John Wesley (disambiguation).

John Wesley Posey

John Wesley Posey (1801–1884) was an American surgeon, coal mine owner, and significant figure in the Underground Railroad in Indiana, America. Posey was one of the founders and main organizers of the Anti-Slavery League of Indiana.

== Life and career ==
A significant source of information on the Underground Railroad in Indiana is William Cockrum's 1915 work, History of the Underground Railroad, as It Was Conducted by the Anti-Slavery League. According to Cockrum, Posey owned a coal mine that served as a way station for as many as 1000 escaped slaves. (This is one of the rare instances in which the underground railroad was actually subterranean.)

Posey also helped to organize the activities of the Anti-Slavery League. According to Cockrum, the League operated a spy network in Kentucky. Agents of the League masquerading as traveling peddlers would make contact with slaves and help the slaves escape.

Posey was a medical doctor. He volunteered as a surgeon for the Union army during the American Civil War, and served at the Battle of Shiloh. He was also politically active, and was elected as a Whig to be Treasurer of Pike County, Indiana, serving from 1844 to 1848.

Posey married Sarah Blackburn in 1838. He was the father of Francis B. Posey.

Posey was portrayed in The Pageant of Petersburg and Pike County; The Historical Development of Pike County (1916) by Alice Parry Stoops. Wilbur Henry Siebert (1866–1961), a professor at Ohio State University, wrote History of the Underground Railroad as it Was Conducted by the Anti-Slavery League (c. 1915), which includes text about Posey.
