= George H. Proffit =

United States politician from Indiana (1807–1847)

George Proffit

United States Ambassador to Brazil
- In office December 11, 1843 – August 10, 1844
- President: John Tyler
- Preceded by: William Hunter
- Succeeded by: Henry A. Wise

Member of the U.S. House of Representatives from Indiana's 1st district
- In office March 4, 1839 – March 3, 1843
- Preceded by: Ratliff Boon
- Succeeded by: Robert D. Owen

Personal details
- Born: September 4, 1807 New Orleans, Louisiana, U.S.
- Died: September 7, 1847 (aged 40) Louisville, Kentucky, U.S
- Resting place: Walnut Hill Cemetery
- Party: Whig

George H. Proffit (September 4, 1807 – September 7, 1847) was an American lawyer who served two terms as a U.S. representative from Indiana from 1839 to 1843.

== Biography ==
Born in New Orleans, Louisiana, Proffit completed preparatory studies. He moved to Petersburg, Indiana, in 1828. He engaged in mercantile pursuits in Petersburg and Portersville, Indiana. He studied law. He was admitted to the bar and commenced practice in Petersburg, Indiana.

=== State House ===
He served as member of the State house of representatives in 1831, 1832, and 1836–1838.

=== Congress ===
Proffit was elected as a Whig to the Twenty-sixth and Twenty-seventh Congresses (March 4, 1839 – March 3, 1843). He was not a candidate for renomination in 1842.

=== Later career ===
He was appointed by President Tyler as Envoy Extraordinary and Minister Plenipotentiary to Brazil and served from June 7, 1843, to August 10, 1844, when he returned home, the Senate having refused to confirm his appointment.

== Death and burial ==
He died in Louisville, Kentucky, September 7, 1847, and was interred in Walnut Hill Cemetery (Petersburg, Indiana).

U.S. House of Representatives
Preceded by Ratliff Boon	Member of the U.S. House of Representatives from Indiana's 1st congressional district March 4, 1839 – March 3, 1843	Succeeded by Robert D. Owen
Diplomatic posts
Preceded by William Hunter	United States Minister to Brazil; 11 December 1843 – 10 August 1844	Succeeded by Henry A. Wise
