= Lincoln Township, LaPorte County, Indiana =

Lincoln Township
- Township
- Coordinates: 41°33′54″N 86°32′32″W
- Country: United States
- State: Indiana
- County: LaPorte

Government
  - Type: Indiana township

Area
  - Total: 27.89 sq mi (72.2 km^{2})
  - Land: 27.18 sq mi (70.4 km^{2})
  - Water: 0.71 sq mi (1.8 km^{2})
- Elevation: 696 ft (212 m)

Population (2020)
  - Total: 1,846
  - Density: 66/sq mi (25/km^{2})
- FIPS code: 18-43812
- GNIS feature ID: 453571

Lincoln Township is one of twenty-one townships in LaPorte County, Indiana. As of the 2020 census, its population was 1,846 (up from 1,794 at 2010) and it contained 966 housing units. It contains the census-designated place of Fish Lake.

== Geography ==
According to the 2010 census, the township has a total area of 27.89 square miles (72.2 km^{2}), of which 27.18 square miles (70.4 km^{2}) (or 97.45%) is land and 0.71 square miles (1.8 km^{2}) (or 2.55%) is water.
