= John Wesley (disambiguation) =

John Wesley (1703–1791) was an Anglican cleric and theologian, the founder of Methodism.

John Wesley may also refer to:

- John Wesley (artist) (1928–2022), American modern painter
- John Wesley (guitarist) (born 1962), American rock singer and guitarist
- John Wesley (actor) (1947–2019), American actor
- John Wesley (film), a 1954 British film
- John Wesley Hardin (1853–1895), American Old West outlaw
- John Wesley Hyatt (1837–1920), American inventor

== See also ==
- John Westley (1636–1678), 17-century nonconformist minister (grandfather of John Wesley)
- John Westley (actor) (1878–1948), American stage actor
