= John W. Boehne Jr. =

American politician (1895–1973)

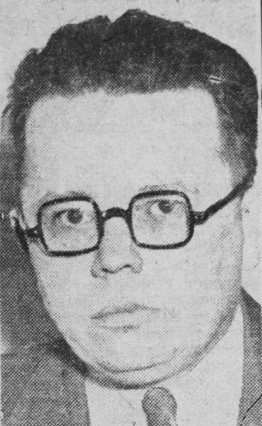
- Boehne in 1934

Member of the U.S. House of Representatives from Indiana
- In office March 4, 1931 – January 3, 1943
- Preceded by: Harry E. Rowbottom (1st); Albert H. Vestal (8th)
- Succeeded by: William T. Schulte (1st); Charles M. La Follette (8th)
- Constituency: 1st district (1931-33); 8th district (1933-43)

Personal details
- Born: John William Boehne Jr. March 2, 1895 Evansville, Indiana, U.S.
- Died: July 5, 1973 (aged 78) Baltimore, Maryland, U.S
- Resting place: Rock Creek Cemetery
- Party: Democratic
- Relatives: John W. Boehne (father)
- Education: University of Wisconsin–Madison

Military service
- Allegiance: United States of America
- Branch/service: United States Army
- Years of service: January 9, 1918–April 8, 1919
- Rank: Sergeant
- Unit: Detached Service of the Ordnance Corps
- Battles/wars: World War I

John William Boehne Jr. (March 2, 1895 – July 5, 1973) was an American World War I veteran who served six terms as a U.S. representative from Indiana from 1931 to 1942.

== Biography ==
Born in Evansville, Indiana, Boehne was the grandson of German immigrants, and son of John William Boehne, who also served in Congress. He attended the public and parochial schools of Evansville and graduated from the University of Wisconsin–Madison in 1918.

=== World War I ===
During World War I he served as a private and sergeant in the Detached Service of the Ordnance Corps of the United States Army from January 9, 1918, to April 8, 1919. He was secretary and treasurer of Evansville's Indiana Stove Works from 1920 to 1931.

=== Congress ===
Boehne was elected as a Democrat to the Seventy-second Congress. He was reelected five times and served from March 4, 1931, to January 3, 1943). In 1942, he was an unsuccessful candidate for reelection to the Seventy-eighth Congress.

=== Later career and death ===
From 1943 to 1957, Boehne was a corporation tax counselor in Washington, D.C., and resided in Chevy Chase, Maryland. After retiring, he was a resident of Irvington, Baltimore, Maryland.

He died in Irvington on July 5, 1973, and was buried at Rock Creek Cemetery in Washington, D.C.

== Electoral history ==
General election 1928
Party	Candidate	Votes	%
Republican	Harry E. Rowbottom	49,013	50.8
Democratic	John W. Boehne Jr.	47,404	49.2

General election 1930
Party	Candidate	Votes	%
Democratic	John W. Boehne Jr.	46,836	53.9
Republican	Harry E. Rowbottom	40,015	46.1

U.S. House of Representatives
Preceded by Harry E. Rowbottom	Member of the U.S. House of Representatives from Indiana's 1st congressional district 1931–1933	Succeeded by William T. Schulte
Preceded by Albert H. Vestal	Member of the U.S. House of Representatives from Indiana's 8th congressional district 1933–1943	Succeeded by Charles M. La Follette
