= William F. Parrett =

American politician

William Fletcher Parrett
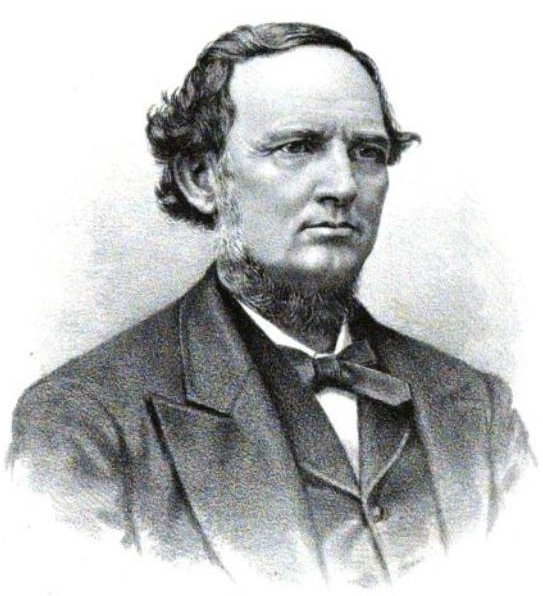
- From 1889's History of Vanderburgh County, Indiana

Member of the U.S. House of Representatives from Indiana's 1st district
- In office March 4, 1889 – March 3, 1893
- Preceded by: Francis B. Posey
- Succeeded by: Arthur H. Taylor

Personal details
- Born: August 10, 1825 Blairsville, Indiana, U.S.
- Died: June 30, 1895 (aged 69)

William Fletcher Parrett (August 10, 1825 – June 30, 1895) was an American lawyer and politician who served two terms as a U.S. representative from Indiana from 1889 to 1893.

== Biography ==
Born near Blairsville, Indiana, Parrett attended the public schools and the Indiana Asbury (now De Pauw) University at Greencastle. He studied law. He was admitted to the bar and practiced in Evansville, Indiana, until 1852. He moved to Oregon, where he practiced law for two and a half years. He returned to Evansville in 1854, and moved to Boonville, Indiana, in 1855.

=== Political career ===
He served as member of the State house of representatives in 1858 and served during the general and special sessions. He was appointed and subsequently elected judge of the fifteenth circuit and served from 1859 to 1865. He returned to Evansville.

He was reelected circuit judge and served from 1865 to 1871. He was appointed judge of the first circuit and elected in 1873, 1879, and 1884. He resigned in December 1888.

=== Congress ===
Parrett was elected as a Democrat to the Fifty-first and Fifty-second Congresses (March 4, 1889 – March 3, 1893). He was not a candidate for renomination in 1892.

=== Later career and death ===
He resumed the practice of law until his death in Evansville, Indiana, June 30, 1895. He was interred in Oak Hill Cemetery.

U.S. House of Representatives
Preceded by Francis B. Posey	Member of the U.S. House of Representatives from Indiana's 1st congressional district March 4, 1889 – March 3, 1893	Succeeded by Arthur H. Taylor
