= Johnson Township, LaPorte County, Indiana =

Johnson Township
- Township
- Coordinates: 41°28′38″N 86°33′19″W
- Country: United States
- State: Indiana
- County: LaPorte

Government
  - Type: Indiana township

Area
  - Total: 17.83 sq mi (46.2 km^{2})
  - Land: 17.82 sq mi (46.2 km^{2})
  - Water: 0.01 sq mi (0.026 km^{2})
- Elevation: 692 ft (211 m)

Population (2020)
  - Total: 207
  - Density: 11.1/sq mi (4.3/km^{2})
- FIPS code: 18-38736
- GNIS feature ID: 453515

Johnson Township is one of twenty-one townships in LaPorte County, Indiana. As of the 2020 census, its population was 207 (up from 198 at 2010) and it contained 82 housing units.

== Geography ==
According to the 2010 census, the township has a total area of 17.83 square miles (46.2 km^{2}), of which 17.82 square miles (46.2 km^{2}) (or 99.94%) is land and 0.01 square miles (0.026 km^{2}) (or 0.06%) is water.
