= Francis B. Posey =

US Congressman from Indiana (1848–1915)

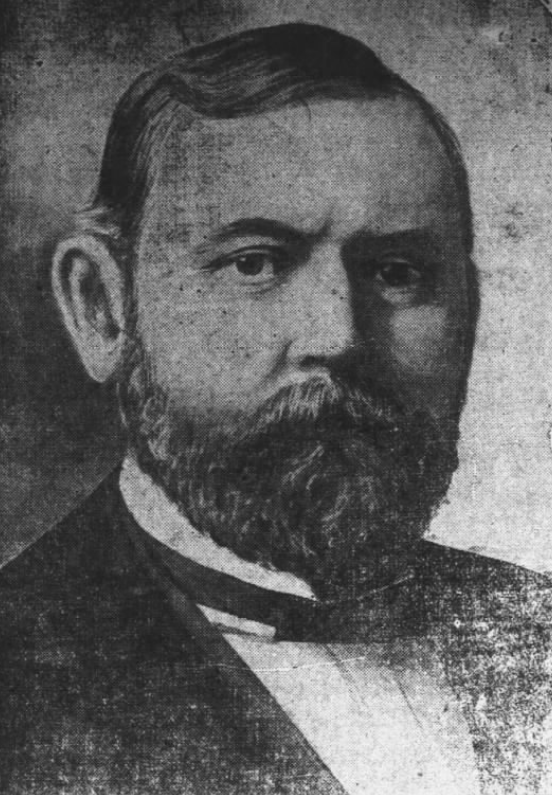

Member of the United States House of Representatives
- In office January 29, 1889 – March 3, 1889
- Preceded by: Alvin P. Hovey
- Succeeded by: William F. Parrett
- Constituency: Indiana's 1st district

Personal details
- Born: Francis Blackburn Posey; April 28, 1848 Petersburg, Indiana, U.S.
- Died: October 31, 1915 (aged 67) Rockport, Indiana, U.S.
- Party: Republican
- Spouse: Emma Brown (m. 1878)
- Children: John Adams Posey
- Education: Indiana University Maurer School of Law

Francis Blackburn Posey (April 28, 1848 – October 31, 1915) was an American lawyer who served for five weeks as a member of the United States House of Representatives from Indiana in 1889.

== Biography ==
Francis B. Posey was born in Petersburg, Indiana on April 28, 1848, the son of John Wesley Posey and Sarah Blackburn Posey.

He attended Asbury College for one year, and earned a law degree at Indiana University Maurer School of Law in 1869. He married Emma Brown on January 17, 1878, and they had four children, one of whom was John Adams Posey.

=== Congress ===
He served in the U.S. Congress from January 29, 1889, to March 3, 1889. He was elected to fill the vacancy created by the resignation of Alvin P. Hovey, who had been elected Governor of Indiana. Posey was defeated for re-election to the U.S. Congress. He also ran unsuccessfully for other offices, including the Indiana state Senate. Posey was also an elector on the James Garfield ticket in 1880.

=== Death ===
Francis B. Posey died at his home in Rockport, Indiana on October 31, 1915. He was buried at Walnut Hill Cemetery (Petersburg, Indiana).

U.S. House of Representatives
Preceded by Alvin P. Hovey	Member of the U.S. House of Representatives from Indiana's 1st congressional district 1889	Succeeded by William F. Parrett
