= John W. Boehne =

American politician (1856–1946)

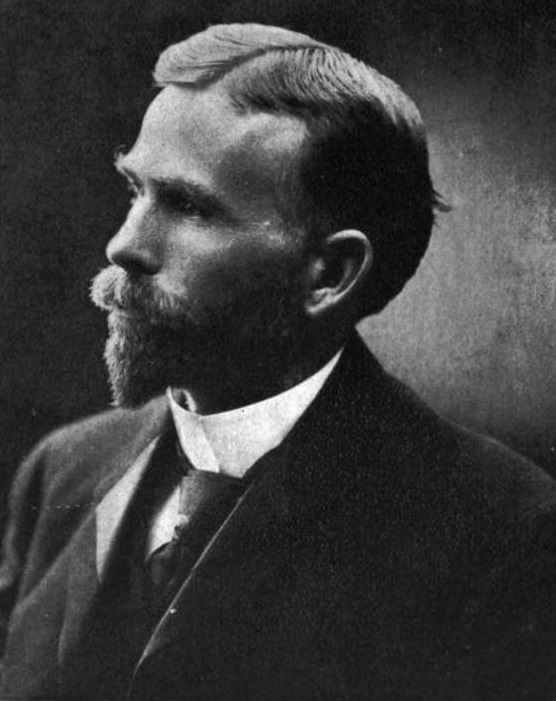
- Frontispiece of Evansville, Indiana's municipal report for 1906

Member of the U.S. House of Representatives from Indiana's 1st district
- In office March 4, 1909 – March 3, 1913
- Preceded by: John H. Foster
- Succeeded by: Charles Lieb

Personal details
- Born: John William Boehne; October 28, 1856 Scott Township, Indiana, U.S.
- Died: December 27, 1946 (aged 90) Evansville, Indiana, U.S.
- Party: Democratic
- Children: John W. Boehne Jr.

John William Boehne (October 28, 1856 – December 27, 1946) was a U.S. representative from Indiana, father of John W. Boehne Jr.

== Biography ==
Born in Scott Township, Indiana, Boehne attended the district schools, the German parochial school of the Lutheran Church, and Evansville Business College. He moved to Evansville, Indiana, in 1872, becoming an accountant. He engaged in the manufacture of stoves and ranges and was interested in other manufacturing enterprises.

Boehne was elected councilman at large in 1897 and reelected in 1899. He was an unsuccessful Democratic candidate for mayor of Evansville in 1901. He served as mayor 1905–1908. He served as delegate to the Democratic National Convention in 1908.

Boehne was elected as a Democrat to the Sixty-first and Sixty-second Congresses (March 4, 1909 – March 3, 1913). He was not a candidate for renomination in 1912. He served as director of the Federal Reserve Bank at St. Louis, Missouri. He retired from active business pursuits. He died in Evansville, Indiana, December 27, 1946. He was interred in the Lutheran Cemetery.

The John W. Boehne House at Evansville was added to the National Register of Historic Places in 1983.

U.S. House of Representatives
| Preceded by John H. Foster | Member of the U.S. House of Representatives from Indiana's 1st congressional district 1909-1913 | Succeeded by Charles Lieb |
