= National Register of Historic Places listings in LaPorte County, Indiana =

Location of LaPorte County in Indiana

This is a list of the National Register of Historic Places listings in LaPorte County, Indiana.

This is intended to be a complete list of the properties and districts on the National Register of Historic Places in LaPorte County, Indiana, United States. Latitude and longitude coordinates are provided for many National Register properties and districts; these locations may be seen together in a map.

There are 35 properties and districts listed on the National Register in the county. Another property was once listed but has been removed.

Properties and districts located in incorporated areas display the name of the municipality, while properties and districts in unincorporated areas display the name of their civil township. Properties and districts split between multiple jurisdictions display the names of all jurisdictions.

This National Park Service list is complete through NPS recent listings posted March 20, 2026.

== Current listings ==
	Name on the Register	Image	Date listed	Location	City or town	Description
1	Ames Family Homestead	Ames Family Homestead	December 19, 2012 (#12001062)	5332 and 5336 W150N, northwest of LaPorte; 41°37′36″N 86°48′12″W	Center Township	
2	Barker House	Barker House	December 7, 2001 (#01001349)	444 Barker Rd. 41°41′17″N 86°52′59″W	Michigan City	Save the Dunes offices and Barker Woods Nature Preserve (managed by Shirley Heinze Land Trust)
3	John H. Barker Mansion	John H. Barker Mansion	October 10, 1975 (#75000027)	631 Washington St. 41°42′53″N 86°54′09″W	Michigan City	Michigan City Civic Center
4	John and Isabel Burnham House	John and Isabel Burnham House	August 1, 2013 (#13000085)	2602 Lake Shore Dr. 41°44′56″N 86°50′58″W	Long Beach	
5	Cedar Lodge		March 3, 2025 (#100011478)	706 West 11th Street; 41°35′52″N 86°43′36″W		Cedar Lodge, ca. 1915 Craftsman home designed by George Wood Allen for Dr. H. H. Martin.
6	Downtown LaPorte Historic District	Downtown LaPorte Historic District	September 15, 1983 (#83000039)	Roughly bounded by State, Jackson, Maple, and Chicago Sts. 41°36′41″N 86°43′20″W	LaPorte	
7	Elston Grove Historic District	Elston Grove Historic District	September 25, 2013 (#13000759)	Bounded by Michigan Boulevard and 11th, Pine, and 6th Sts. 41°42′49″N 86°53′35″W	Michigan City	
8	First Congregational Church of Michigan City	First Congregational Church of Michigan City	December 7, 2001 (#01001343)	531 Washington St. 41°42′57″N 86°54′11″W	Michigan City	
9	James and Lavinia Forrester Farmstead	James and Lavinia Forrester Farmstead	June 12, 2017 (#100001060)	969 Forrester Rd. 41°35′33″N 86°48′41″W	Scipio Township	
10	Franklin Street Commercial Historic District	Franklin Street Commercial Historic District	December 31, 2013 (#13001013)	Bounded by Pine, 4th, and 11th Sts., and the alley between Franklin and Washington Sts. 41°42′51″N 86°54′01″W	Michigan City	
11	Dr. Robert and Amelia Frost House		August 21, 2020 (#100005503)	3215 Cleveland Ave. 41°41′25″N 86°53′03″W	Michigan City	
12	Garrettson-Baine-Bartholomew House	Garrettson-Baine-Bartholomew House	December 7, 2001 (#01001340)	2921 Franklin St. 41°41′51″N 86°53′41″W	Michigan City	
13	John and Cynthia Garwood Farmstead	John and Cynthia Garwood Farmstead	June 15, 2012 (#12000334)	5600 Small Rd., west of LaPorte; 41°36′40″N 86°48′31″W	Center Township	
14	Haskell and Barker Historic District	Haskell and Barker Historic District	September 30, 2014 (#14000806)	Washington and Wabash between 4th and Homer Sts. 41°42′38″N 86°54′04″W	Michigan City	
15	Hoover-Timme House	Hoover-Timme House	August 1, 2013 (#13000086)	2304 Hazeltine Dr. 41°44′42″N 86°51′19″W	Long Beach	
16	Indiana and Michigan Avenues Historic District	Indiana and Michigan Avenues Historic District	September 30, 2014 (#14000807)	Roughly Indiana and Michigan between Maple and Kingsbury Aves. 41°36′20″N 86°43′00″W	La Porte	
17	Lowell E. and Paula G. Jackson House	Lowell E. and Paula G. Jackson House	August 1, 2013 (#13000087)	2935 Ridge Rd. 41°45′07″N 86°50′24″W	Long Beach	
18	George and Adele Jaworowski House	George and Adele Jaworowski House	August 1, 2013 (#13000088)	3501 Lake Shore Dr. in Duneland Beach; 41°45′28″N 86°49′44″W	Michigan Township	
19	Long Beach School	Long Beach School	September 3, 2019 (#100004366)	2501 Oriole Trail; 41°44′47″N 86°50′53″W	Long Beach	
20	Michigan City Breakwater Light	Michigan City Breakwater Light	July 24, 2017 (#100001344)	On breakwater in Lake Michigan, 0.5 miles northwest of the Michigan City harbor 41°43′47″N 86°54′51″W	Michigan City	
21	Michigan City East Pierhead Light Tower and Elevated Walk	Michigan City East Pierhead Light Tower and Elevated Walk	February 17, 1988 (#88000069)	Eastern side of the entrance to Michigan City Harbor; 41°43′41″N 86°54′35″W	Michigan City	
22	Michigan City Lighthouse	Michigan City Lighthouse	November 5, 1974 (#74000023)	Washington Park; 41°43′22″N 86°54′22″W	Michigan City	
23	Michigan City Post Office	Michigan City Post Office	June 15, 2000 (#00000675)	126 E. 5th St. 41°43′04″N 86°54′03″W	Michigan City	In 2010, the building was being used as a law office.
24	Francis H. Morrison House	Francis H. Morrison House	December 6, 1984 (#84000492)	1217 Michigan Ave. 41°36′24″N 86°43′00″W	LaPorte	
25	MUSKEGON Shipwreck Site	MUSKEGON Shipwreck Site	April 26, 1989 (#89000290)	Address Restricted	Michigan City	
26	William Orr House	William Orr House	March 22, 1984 (#84001063)	4076 W. Small Rd., west of LaPorte; 41°36′36″N 86°46′42″W	Center Township	
27	Pinehurst Hall	Pinehurst Hall	June 3, 1976 (#76000027)	3042 N. U.S. Route 35, northwest of LaPorte; 41°39′03″N 86°45′36″W	Center Township	
28	Pinhook Methodist Church and Cemetery	Pinhook Methodist Church and Cemetery	September 24, 2009 (#09000759)	8001 State Road 2, northeast of Westville; 41°33′48″N 86°51′28″W	New Durham Township	
29	Marion Ridgeway Polygonal Barn	Marion Ridgeway Polygonal Barn	May 27, 1993 (#93000464)	U.S. Route 35 north of its junction with Crescent Dr. 41°35′25″N 86°42′09″W	LaPorte	
30	Scott-Rumley House	Scott-Rumley House	December 27, 2016 (#16000905)	211 Rose St. 41°36′44″N 86°42′51″W	La Porte	
31	Everel S. Smith House	Everel S. Smith House	December 12, 1990 (#90001794)	56 W. Jefferson St. 41°32′36″N 86°53′52″W	Westville	
32	Swedish Evangelical Lutheran Carmel Chapel and Carmel Cemetery		May 24, 2021 (#100006566)	5901 West 50 South; 41°36′00″N 86°49′20″W	LaPorte vicinity	
33	Tryon Farm	Tryon Farm	August 21, 2020 (#100005515)	1400 and 1402 Tryon Rd. 41°43′29″N 86°50′30″W	Michigan City	
34	Washington Park	Washington Park	June 26, 1991 (#91000793)	Roughly bounded by Lake Michigan, Krueger St., Trail Creek, Lakeshore Dr., Heisman Harbor Rd., and Browne Basin Rd. 41°43′34″N 86°54′03″W	Michigan City	
35	Wynkoop-Taylor-Swanson-Sharp Farmstead	Wynkoop-Taylor-Swanson-Sharp Farmstead	September 18, 2017 (#100001607)	3463 N. State Road 39, north of LaPorte; 41°39′31″N 86°44′17″W	Center Township	

== Former listing ==
	Name on the Register	Image	Date listed	Date removed	Location	City or town	Description
1	Michigan Central Railroad Engine Repair Shops		May 12, 1975 (#75000028)	August 11, 1978	104 N. Franklin St.	Michigan City	

== See also ==
- List of National Historic Landmarks in Indiana
- National Register of Historic Places listings in Indiana
- Listings in neighboring counties: Berrien (MI), Jasper, Porter, St. Joseph, Starke
- List of Indiana state historical markers in LaPorte County
