= John and Cynthia Garwood Farmstead =

- U.S. National Register of Historic Places
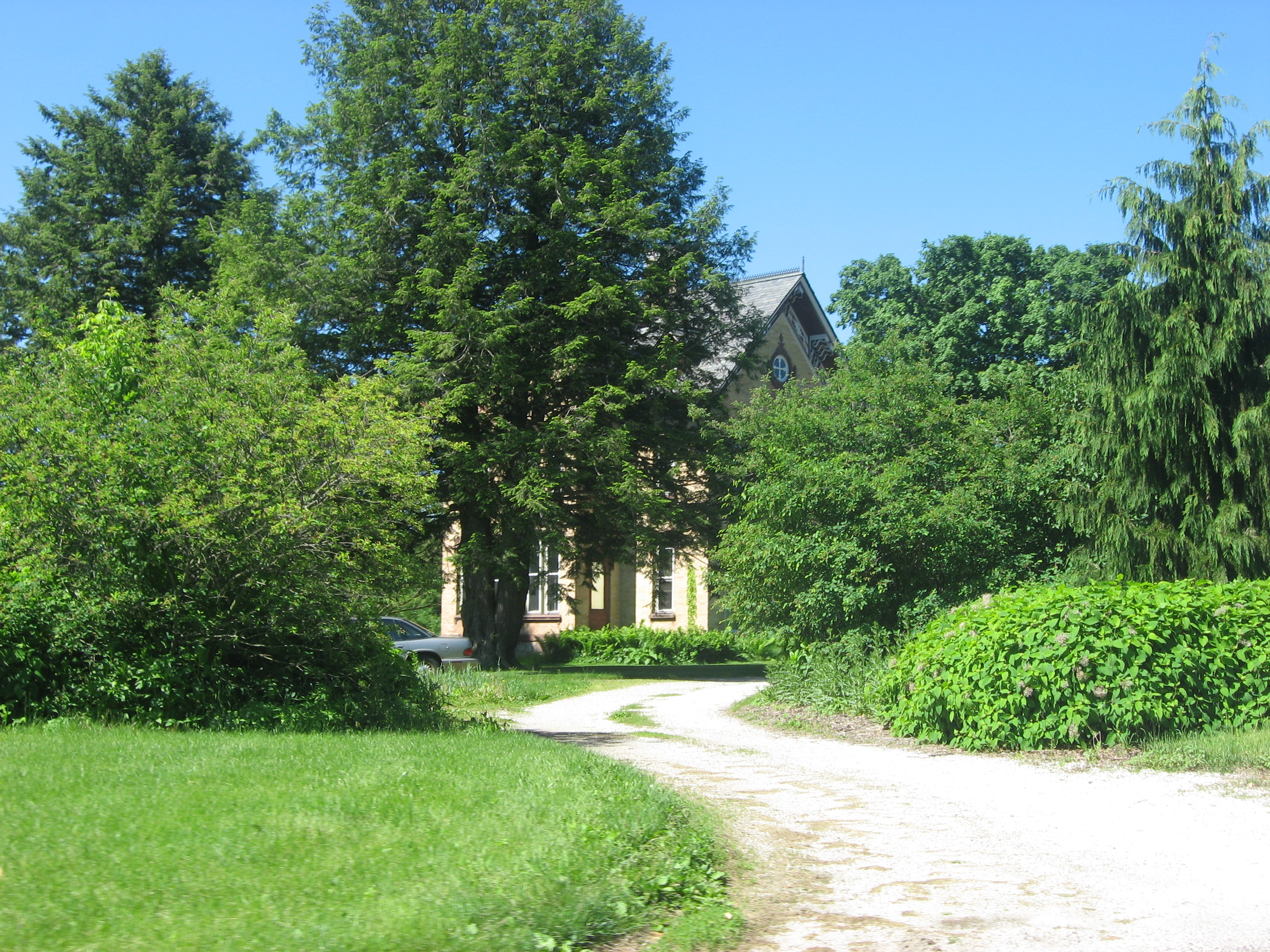
- John and Cynthia Garwood Farmstead, June 2013

- Location within Indiana Location within the United States
- Location: 5600 Small Rd., west of LaPorte in Center Township, LaPorte County, Indiana
- Coordinates: 41°36′40″N 86°48′31″W
- Area: 6.5 acres (2.6 ha)
- Built: c. 1866, c. 1930
- Architectural style: Italian Villa
- NRHP reference No.: 12000334
- Added to NRHP: June 15, 2012

John and Cynthia Garwood Farmstead is a historic home and farm located in Center Township, LaPorte County, Indiana. The house was built about 1866, and is a tall 2 1/2-story, three-bay, Italian Villa style brick dwelling. It has a gabled-ell form with a center tower. Also on the property are the contributing gambrel-roofed barn (c. 1930), milk house (c. 1930), and silo (c. 1930).

It was listed on the National Register of Historic Places in 2012.
