= Fort at Door Village =

Coordinates: 41.5763°N 86.7600°W

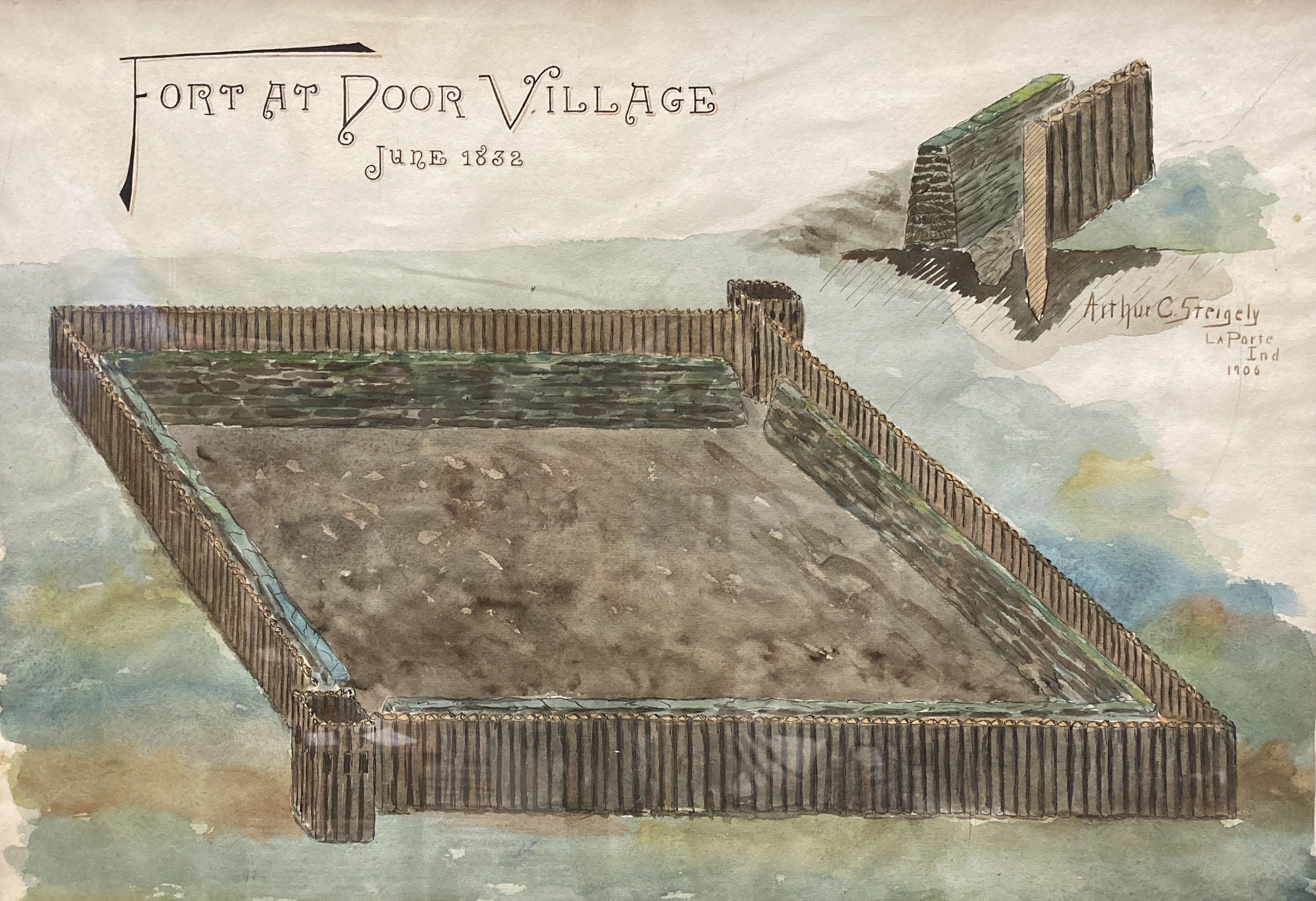
Arthur C. Steigely, 1906.

The Fort at Door Village was one of the hastily built forts erected by settlers after the onset of the 1832 Black Hawk War.

In 1832, white residents of LaPorte County, Indiana, constructed a stockade fort near Joliet Road between Door Village and the city of LaPorte. The fort arose to defend against an attack from Black Hawk. They feared that Black Hawk's band was raiding and murdering innocent white settlers and headed to LaPorte County. However, there was no attack planned or threatened. The fort's construction was based on misinformation and fear based on negative stereotypes of Native Americans.

== Beginning of the Black Hawk War ==
In truth, Black Hawk's band had not attacked white settlers and was traveling west back to Iowa territory when, on May 14, 1832, drunken militiamen killed Black Hawk scouts carrying a white flag and then attacked Black Hawk's camp. The disorganized attackers were easily repelled in the ensuing skirmish. Eleven militiamen were killed and 42 others deserted. That was the Battle of Stillman's Run which started the Black Hawk War. It forced Black Hawk to flee and to seek safety north and west through Wisconsin to try to cross the Mississippi River. According to historian Mark Wyman, "The major cause of the Black Hawk War was the long-term buildup of fear and hatred between Indians and whites along the Mississippi."

== Forting up ==
Under the direction of Peter White, men gathered and built a stockade fort on the Door Village prairie to protect against a Black Hawk invasion that was never coming. Construction lasted a couple days. Not all men in Door Village were fooled. Jean Baptiste Chandonnai had traveled and lived throughout Lake Michigan and Lake Huron and had experience working with Native Americans. According to one story, General Joseph Orr asked Chandonnai if he thought Black Hawk would come to LaPorte County. Chandonnai told him, No.

In Olive Township, Saint Joseph County, and Cedar Lake, Lagrange County, groups of men began to construct forts. Neither fort was completed because they quickly realized there was no threat.

== Written history ==
The oldest-known written account of the Door Village fort was published by Jasper Packard in 1874. Regarding the Black Hawk threat to white settlers of LaPorte County, Packard wrote, "The alarm proved, as is almost invariably the case, to have been greatly exaggerated." Packard repeated those words in his book.

In 1904, E.D. Daniels reversed the history of the Door Village Fort in his book, A Twentieth Century History and Biographical Record of LaPorte County, Indiana. Daniels copied the history of the Door Village Fort from Jasper Packard, but deleted the sentence about the exaggerated alarm of the threat of Black Hawk. Instead, Daniels wrote, "The Black Hawk war was now coming on, and, like distant mutterings before a storm, there were several Indian scares."

Daniels created stories that demonized Native Americans, writing that no civilized people passed through LaPorte County until white people arrived, referred to Native Americans as savages and red men, called their writing "rude hieroglyphics," their agriculture practices imperfect, and that they were treacherous, thieves, and "were not as clean as might be in their habits." He also made up stories of hostile Native Americans when there is no record of any in LaPorte County, Indiana.

Daniels is not a trustworthy source of history. In the preface of his book, he wrote that he, "often adopted verbatim the very language of another as his own," and "This is not a standard history. . . This is a work for the parlor table or drawing-room book case." In short, he plagiarized, embellished, and added fiction to make the history more exciting.

== Art ==
In 1906, Arthur C. Steigely painted a watercolor of the Door Village fort that hangs in the LaPorte County Historical Society Museum today. If the painting is an accurate depiction of the fort, then it was constructed backwards with the moat inside the fort's walls, rather than outside as is common of stockade forts.

== Setting a monument ==
In 1910, the LaPorte Historical Society installed a monument to commemorate Door Village fort. It consisted of a large granite rock with two bronze plaques. One plaque features the names of 42 men who supposedly built it. The other plaque reads, "On this spot a fort-stockade was built to defend the lives of the pioneers of LaPorte Prairie from a threatened invasion by Black Hawk and his braves in the spring of 1832. Warning of the danger was brought by John Coleman who rode his Indian pony Musquog from Ft. Dearborn to this place in six hours." The source of that information, written in bronze, is unknown and there is no record of those events.

The LaPorte Historical Society tasked William Niles to research the Black Hawk War and present his findings at the monument's unveiling. He was the keynote speaker. Reading from his paper, Niles said that no conflict with Native Americans occurred anywhere near LaPorte County, but that "the danger seemed very real and near." Niles went on to say, "Thinking that others may be as ill-informed about the war and as much interested as I was, I have taken some account of those events from those sources, which are all in substantial agreement." He then proceeded to recount the inglorious history of the Black Hawk War—the militia's violation of a white flag of truce that started it, how conflict could have and should have been avoided, and that it concluded with soldiers and militiamen massacring hundreds of Native Americans, including women and children, along the Mississippi River.
