= Pinehurst Hall =

Historic house in Indiana, United States

- U.S. National Register of Historic Places
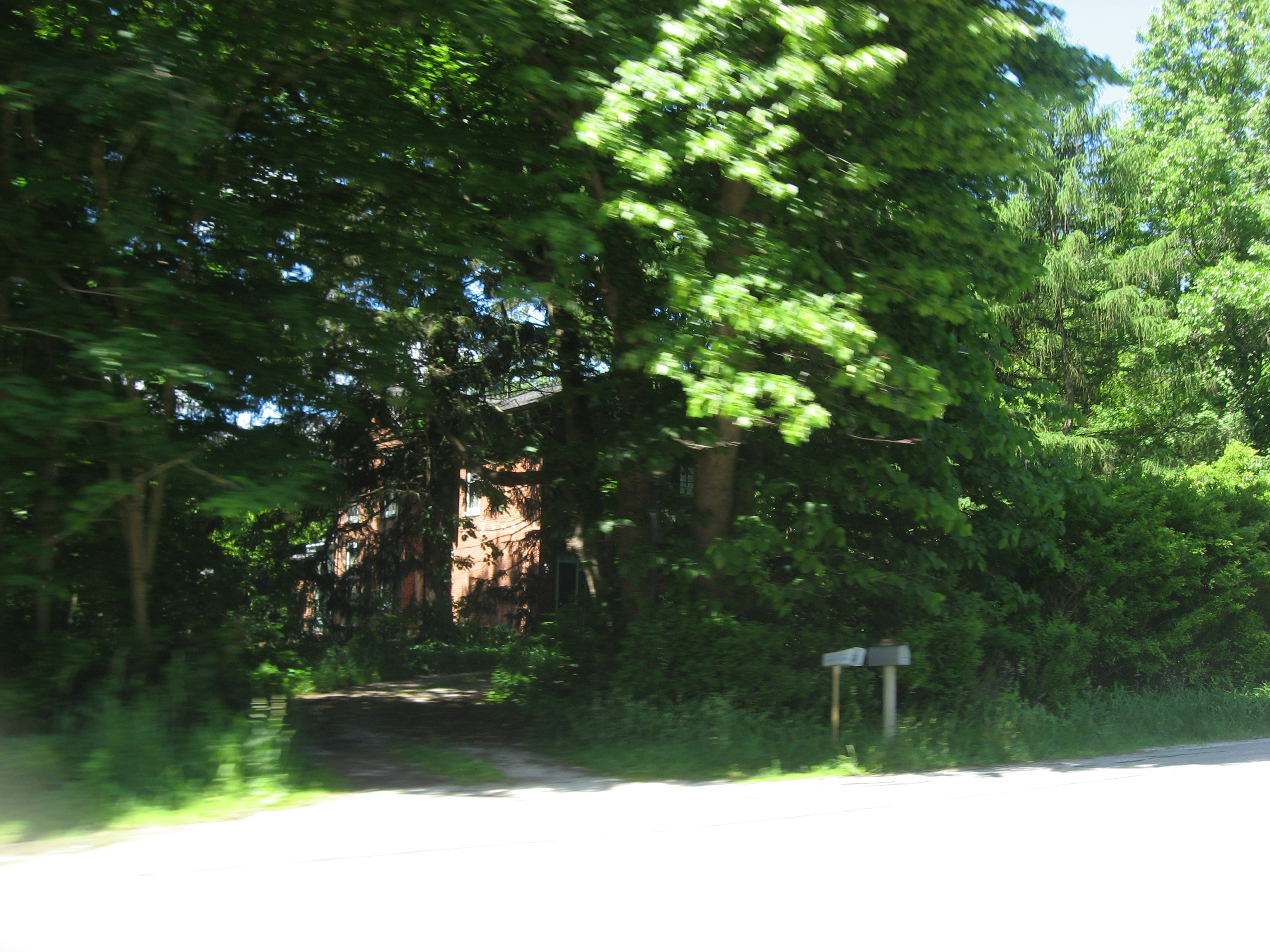
- Pinehurst Hall, June 2013

- Location within Indiana Location within the United States
- Location: 3042 N. U.S. Route 35, northwest of LaPorte in Center Township, LaPorte County, Indiana
- Coordinates: 41°39′3″N 86°45′35″W
- Area: 2 acres (0.81 ha)
- Built: 1853
- Architectural style: Federal
- NRHP reference No.: 76000027
- Added to NRHP: June 3, 1976

Pinehurst Hall, also known as the Charles T. Leaming House, is a historic home located in Center Township, LaPorte County, Indiana. It was built in 1853, and is a two-story, three-bay, Federal style brick dwelling, with Italianate style accents. It sits on a fieldstone foundation and has two one-story rear additions.

It was listed on the National Register of Historic Places in 1976.
