= Pinhook, LaPorte County, Indiana =

Pinhook, Indiana
- Unincorporated community
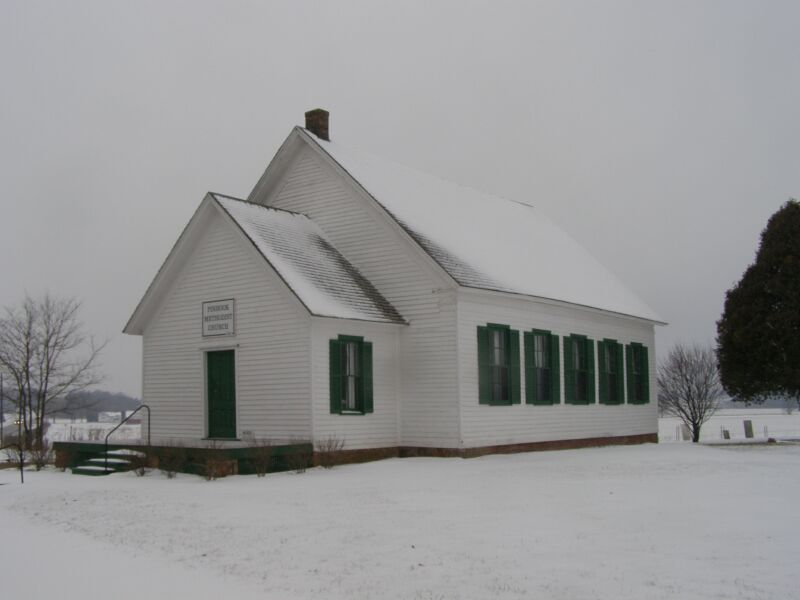
- Pinhook Methodist Church

- Location within Indiana Location within the United States
- Coordinates: 41°33′50″N 86°51′21″W
- Country: United States
- State: Indiana
- County: LaPorte
- Township: New Durham
- Elevation: 827 ft (252 m)
- ZIP code: 46350
- FIPS code: 18-60102
- GNIS feature ID: 450466

Pinhook is an unincorporated community in New Durham Township, LaPorte County, Indiana.

== History ==
Pinhook was originally called New Durham. It was platted under the latter name in 1847. "Pinhook" was at first a derisive nickname given by a neighboring rival town, but it was eventually adopted by the residents of Pinhook themselves.

Pinhook was the setting for the first scene of the 1964 made-for-television suspense thriller movie Nightmare in Chicago.
