= Ames Family Homestead =

- U.S. National Register of Historic Places
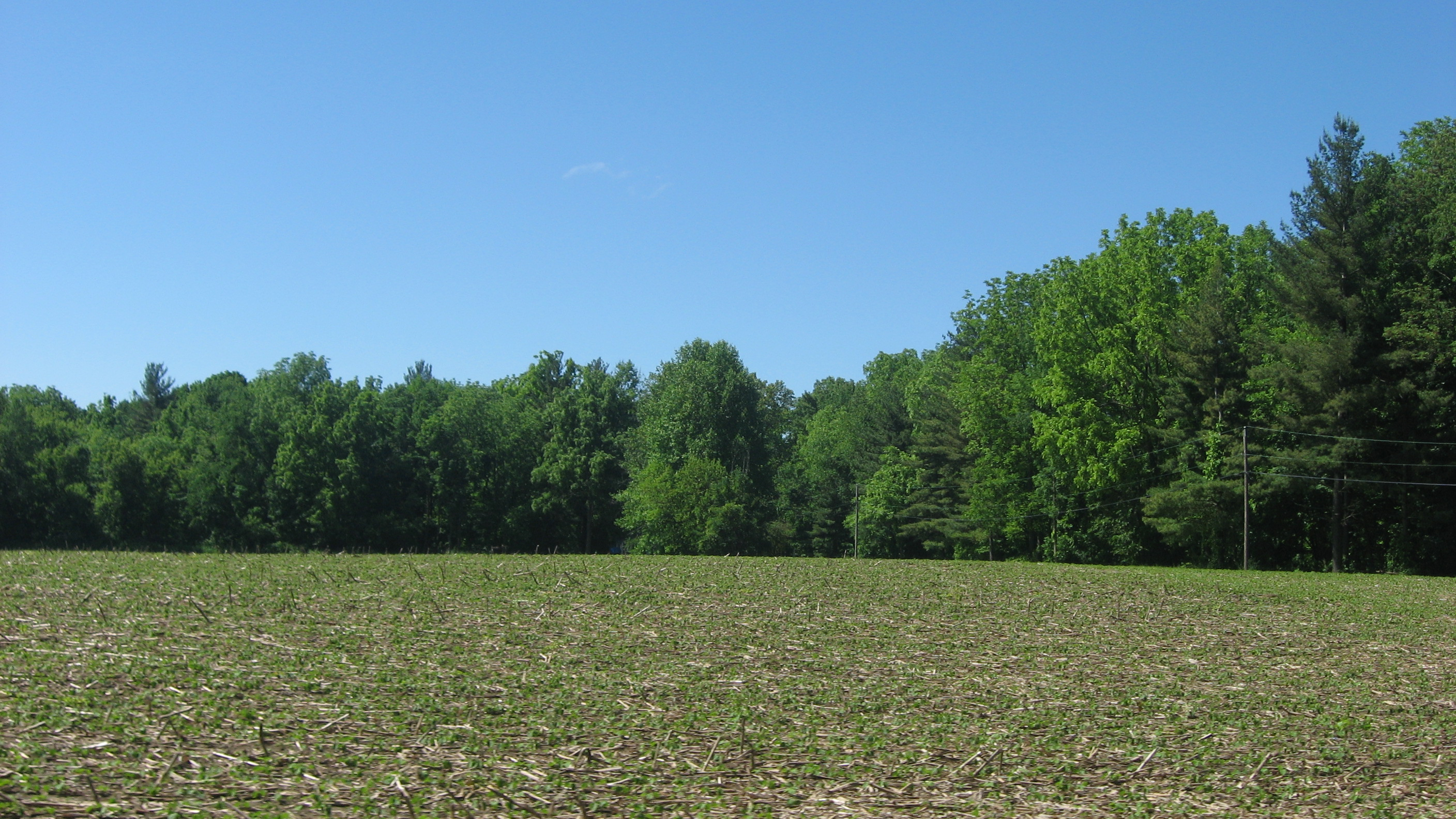
- Field at the Ames Family Homestead, June 2013

- Location within Indiana Location within the United States
- Location: 5332 and 5336 W150N, northwest of LaPorte in Center Township, LaPorte County, Indiana
- Coordinates: 41°37′36″N 86°48′12″W
- Area: 13 acres (5.3 ha)
- Built: 1838, 1842, 1856, c. 1930
- Built by: Ames, Charles
- Architectural style: Federal, Greek Revival
- NRHP reference No.: 12001062
- Added to NRHP: December 19, 2012

Ames Family Homestead is a historic home and farm located in Center Township, LaPorte County, Indiana. The Captain Charles Ames House was built in 1842, and is a 1 1/2-story, Federal style frame dwelling. It has a split granite stone basement and a gable roof with dormers. The Augustus Ames House was built in 1856, and is a 1 1/2-story, Greek Revival style frame dwelling. It sits on a brick foundation and sheathed in clapboard siding. Also on the property are the contributing traverse frame barn (1838), privy (c. 1930), ice house (c. 1930), cow shed (c. 1900), corn crib (c. 1930), chicken coop (c. 1940), silo (c. 1930), water pump (c. 1900) driveway marker (c. 1880), and wood shed (c. 1915).

It was listed on the National Register of Historic Places in 2012.
