= William Orr House =

Historic house in Indiana, United States

- U.S. National Register of Historic Places
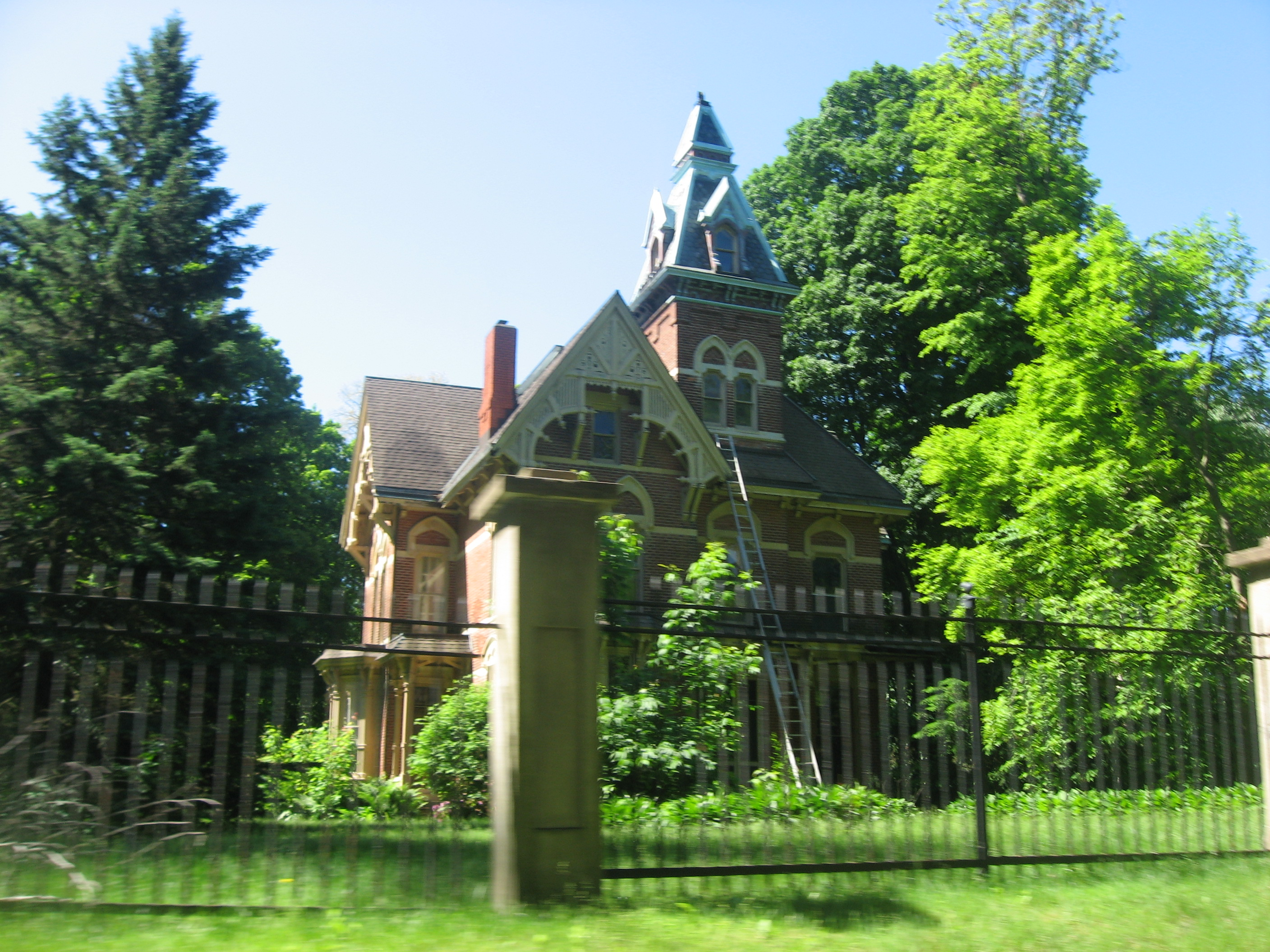
- William Orr House, June 2013

- Location within Indiana Location within the United States
- Location: 4076 W. Small Rd., west of LaPorte in Center Township, LaPorte County, Indiana
- Coordinates: 41°36′36″N 86°46′41″W
- Area: 3 acres (1.2 ha)
- Built: 1875
- Architect: Edbrooke, W. J.
- Architectural style: Stick/eastlake
- NRHP reference No.: 84001063
- Added to NRHP: March 22, 1984

William Orr House, also known as the Orr-Richter House, is a historic home located in Center Township, LaPorte County, Indiana. It was built in 1875, and is a 2 1/2-story, Eastlake movement style brick dwelling, with Italianate and Gothic Revival style design elements. It features a 3 1/2-story central tower with a mansard roof and full-width front porch.

It was listed on the National Register of Historic Places in 1984.
