= WLOI =

- La Porte, Indiana; United States
- Broadcast area: Michigan City, Indiana; Chesterton, Indiana; Westville, Indiana
- Frequency: 1540 kHz
- Branding: Rock 106.5

Programming
- Format: Classic rock

Ownership
- Owner: Spoon River Media, LLC
- Sister stations: WCOE

History
- First air date: September 24, 1948 (license granted)

Technical information
- Licensing authority: FCC
- Facility ID: 36542
- Class: D
- Power: 250 watts daytime only
- Transmitter coordinates: type:city 41°38′1.00″N 86°45′33.00″W
- Translator: 106.5 W293DR (La Porte)

Links
- Public license information: Public file; LMS
- Webcast: Listen Live
- Website: laporterocks.com

WLOI is an AM radio station broadcasting on the frequency of 1540 kHz and licensed to the city of La Porte, Indiana. WLOI broadcasts during daylight hours only; 1540 AM is a United States clear-channel frequency. KXEL is the dominant Class A station on this frequency.

WLOI is owned by Spoon River Media, LLC and broadcasts a classic rock format.

On May 8, 2019, WLOI changed their format from adult standards to classic rock, to be branded as "Rock 106.5" in anticipation of signing on FM translator W293DR 106.5 FM La Porte.

== FM Translator ==
WLOI relays programming to an FM translator; this allows the format to broadcast 24 hours per day, in addition to giving the listener high fidelity stereophonic sound. Geographically, the translator is located between WXNU in St. Anne, Illinois and WVFM in Kalamazoo, Michigan.

Broadcast translator for WLOI
Call sign	Frequency	City of license	FID	ERP (W)	Class	FCC info
W293DR	106.5 FM	La Porte, Indiana	203075	110	D	LMS
