= Pinhook Methodist Church and Cemetery =

Historic church in Indiana, United States

- U.S. National Register of Historic Places
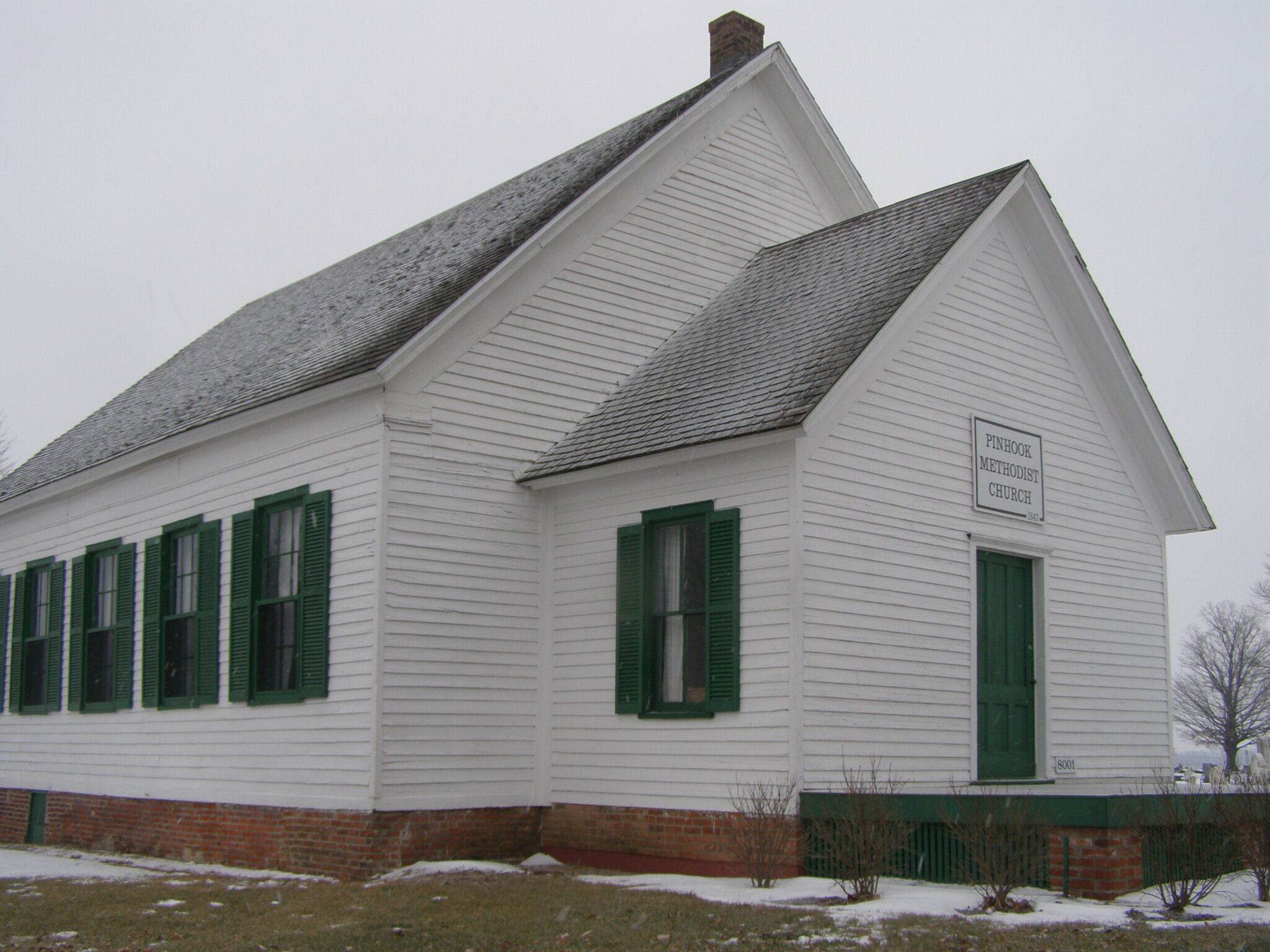
- Pinhook Methodist Church

- Location within Indiana Location within the United States
- Location: 8001 IN 2, LaPorte, Indiana
- Coordinates: 41°33′49″N 86°51′27″W
- Area: 2.5 acres (1.0 ha)
- Built: 1847
- Architect: Barnard, Nelson; McLung, James
- Architectural style: Greek Revival, Gable-front
- NRHP reference No.: 09000759
- Added to NRHP: September 24, 2009

The Pinhook Methodist Church and Cemetery are located in New Durham Township, LaPorte County, Indiana at Wozniak Road with State Road 2. Known as the village of Pinhook, formerly New Durham. The village is mostly residential along the south side of State Road 2. The site includes the Pinhook Methodist Church (1847), the Pinhook Cemetery (1850), the cemetery storage shed (ca. 1900), and the old pump (ca. 1930).

== Methodist Church ==
The frame church building constructed as a one-room, single story clapboard structure in a simple Greek Revival style in 1847. An early vestibule addition was constructed on the front of the building, ca. 1880, inset from the main building facade. The building sits on an orange/red brick foundation rising about 2 feet (0.61 m) above grade. The roof has wood shingles. A brick chimney extends from the ridge of the roof near the front of the main building. The building siding and trim is painted white with dark green windows, shutters and front door.

The front (south) facade is symmetrically with the vestibule projecting from the main building. Above the front door is a wood sign with the name of the church and year of construction. The corner boards on the main building, in keeping with the Greek-Revival style however, terminate at the horizontal entablature wrapping around from the east and west facades, with decorative trim making the appearance of a pilaster cap. The frieze board of the gable then extends up the face of the gable from this horizontal detail. A cove trim piece is located at the juncture of the frieze board and wood soffit of the eave.

== Pinhook Cemetery ==
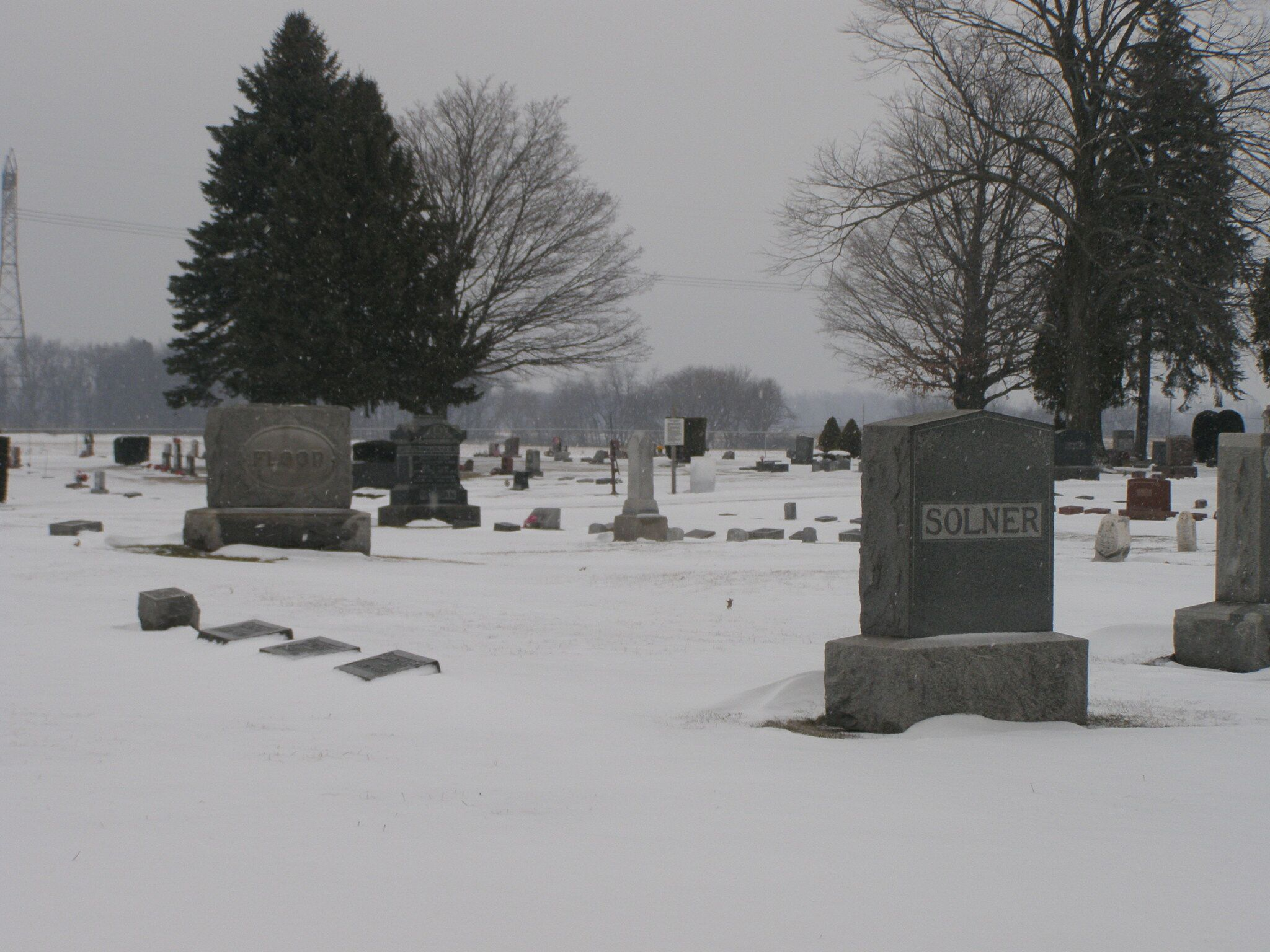
Pinhook Methodist Church Cemetery, LaPorte County, Indiana

The Pinhook Cemetery, established in 1850, is divided into four sections with a single gravel road entering off of State Road 2 near the intersection of Wozniak Road and exiting onto Wozniak Road on its east boundary. It is bordered by State Road 2 on the south, Wozniak Road on the east, and agricultural tilled lands on the north and west. The church is located in its southwest corner. State Road 2 forms a gentle curve northward from the west edge of the cemetery to Wozniak Road. The cemetery is fenced on the east side, and partially on the south side, by a white vinyl picket fence. Newer brick piers flank the entrance and exit. Several mature deciduous and cedar trees are located in the cemetery.

== Cemetery Storage Shed ==
The storage shed is a ca. 1900 small frame building, approximately eight feet wide by twelve feet deep, facing east with a single vertical wood plank door in the center and simple straight stock wood casings on the east facade. The building rests on a concrete block foundation, having been relocated to this site from the center of the cemetery near the pump. The shed is covered with narrow wood clapboard siding and wood corner boards. A single four-pane fixed wood window is located on the north and south facades also with simple straight stock casings; there are no openings on the west facade. The building has a gable roof, with the gable facing east, made of asphalt shingles. There is a vent pipe on the north half of the roof. The shed is in good condition.

== Pump ==
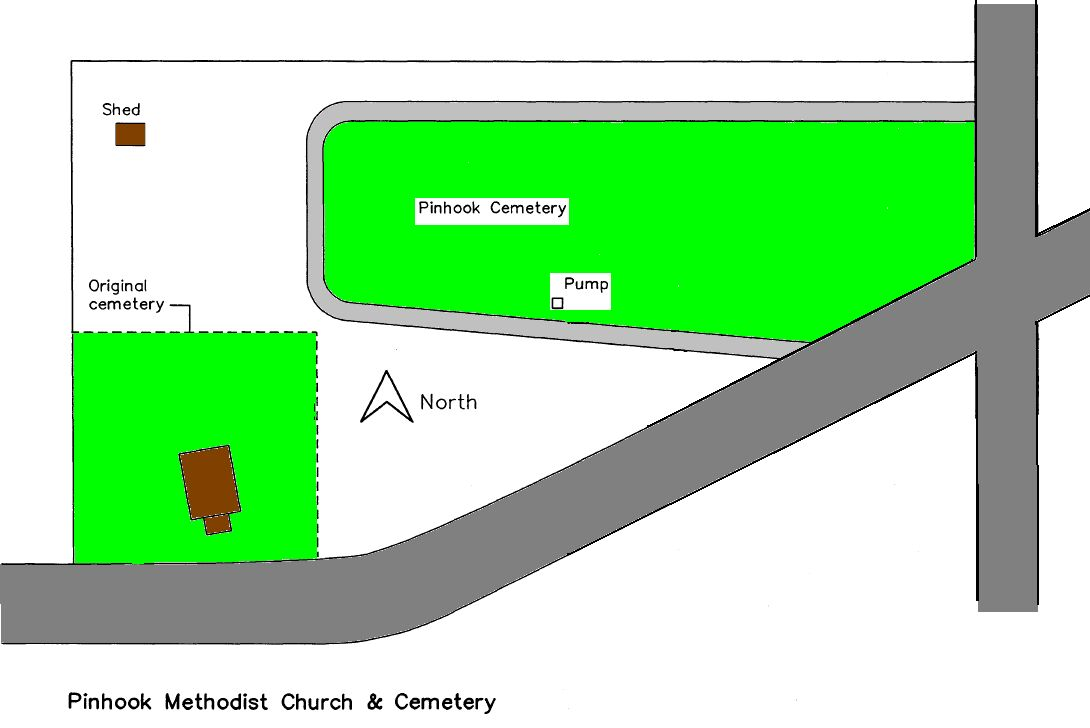
Map of Pinhook Methodist Church and Cemetery, LaPorte County, Indiana

A metal hand water pump, ca. 1930, is located near the center of the cemetery along the main drive. The base around the pump is constructed of treated wood 2x6 materials, the pump rising out of the center of the platform. The pump is made of cast pieces, with the manufacturer's name and city on the east side of the shaft "Baker Mfg. Co. Evansville, Wis." and the pump model name on the west side "Monitor". The pump is in good condition.

== Bibliography ==
- Alt, Julie. Pinhook Church Historical Research Notes and Recollections. Unpublished manuscript, collection of Julie Alt.
- Cannon, Thomas Harvey. The History of Lake and Calumet Region of Indiana. Vol. 1. Indianapolis: Historian's Association, 1927
- History of LaPorte County. Indiana. Chicago: Charles C. Chapman & Co., 1880.
- Indiana Historic Sites and Structures Inventory. LaPorte County Interim Report. LaPorte, IN:Office of Community Planning and Development, 2002.
- Packard, Jasper. History of LaPorte County. Indiana, and its Townships. Towns, and Cities. LaPorte, IN: S.E. Taylor & Co., 1876.
- Taylor, Robert M. et al. Indiana. A New Historical Guide. Indianapolis: Indiana Historical Society, 1989.
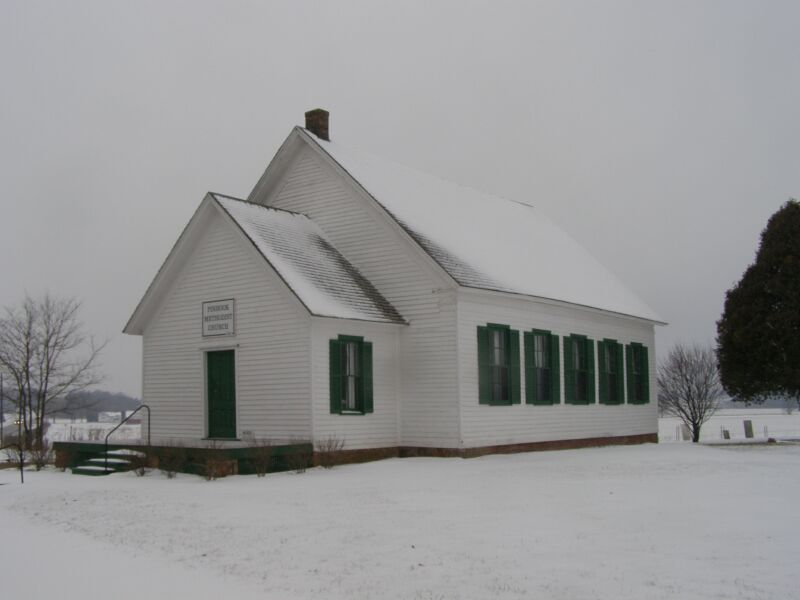
Pinhook Methodist Church - winter

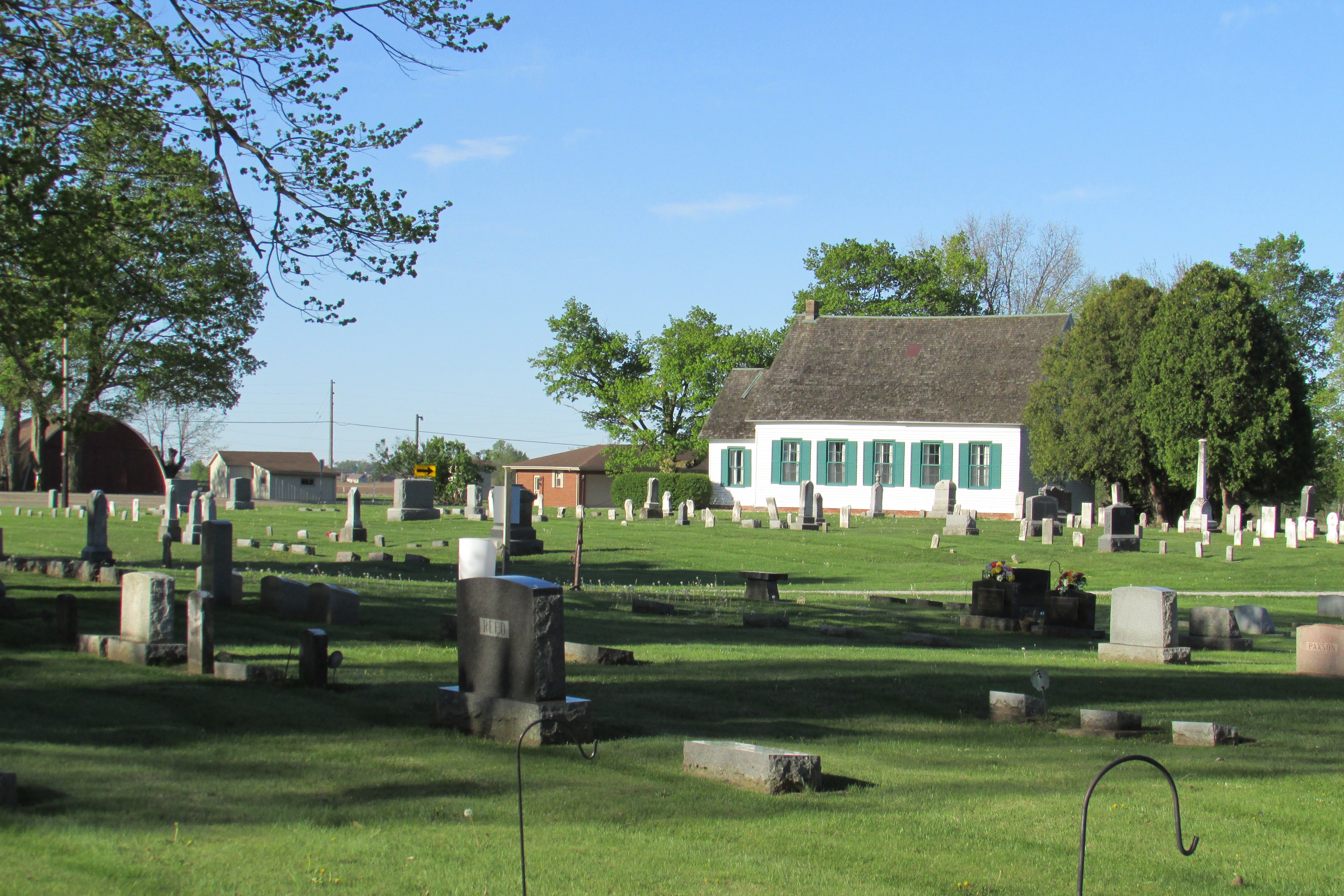
Pinhook Methodist Church and Cemetery
