= Westville, Indiana =

- Town
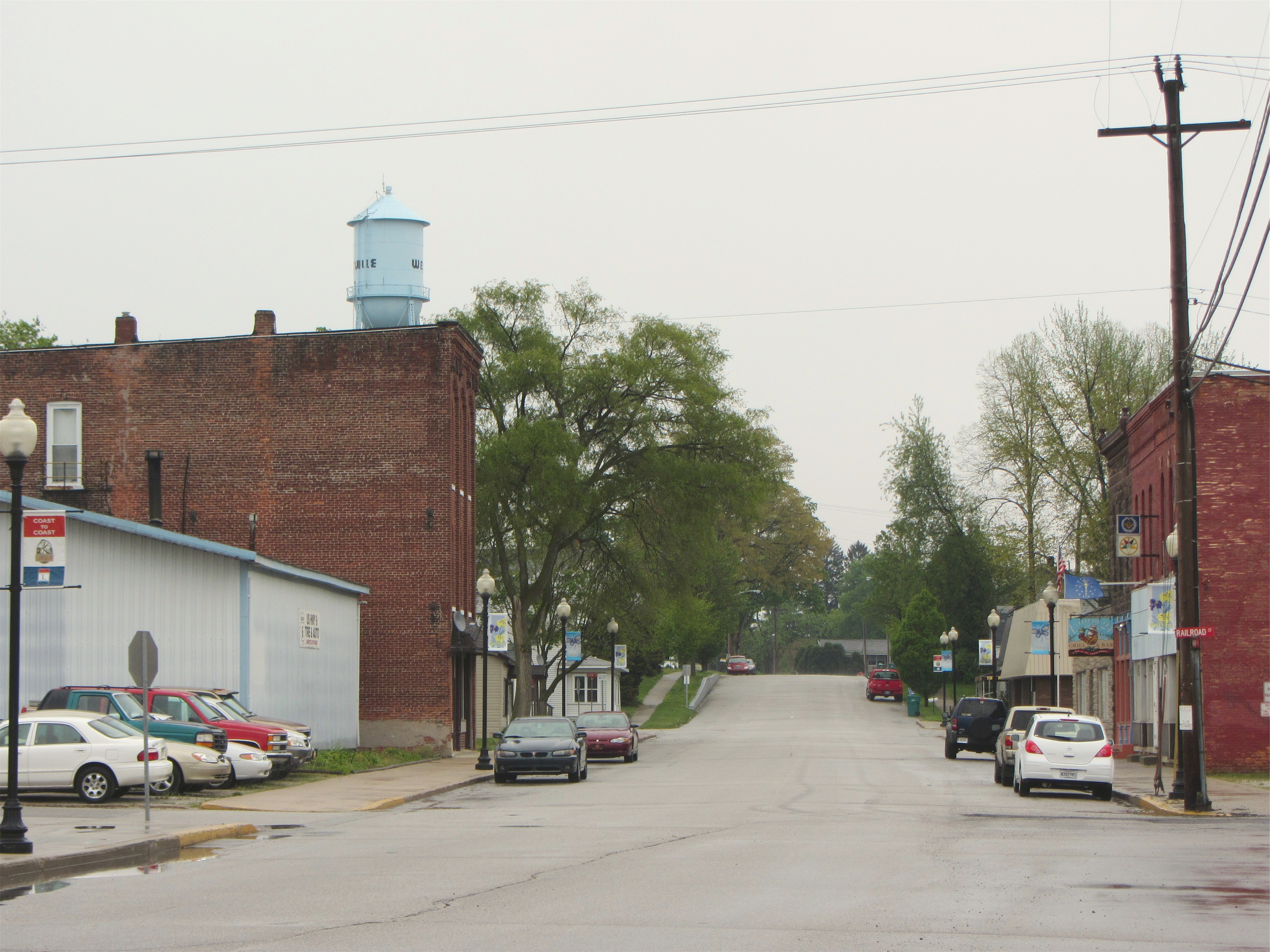
- Main Street in Westville

- Logo
- Motto: Community of Progress
- Location of Westville in LaPorte County, Indiana.
- Coordinates: 41°32′15″N 86°54′18″W
- Country: United States
- State: Indiana
- County: LaPorte
- Township: New Durham

Area
  - Total: 3.25 sq mi (8.42 km^{2})
  - Land: 3.25 sq mi (8.42 km^{2})
  - Water: 0 sq mi (0.00 km^{2})
- Elevation: 774 ft (236 m)

Population (2020)
  - Total: 5,257
  - Density: 1,617.0/sq mi (624.34/km^{2})
- Time zone: UTC-6 (Central (CST))
  - Summer (DST): UTC-5 (CDT)
- ZIP code: 46391
- Area code: 219
- FIPS code: 18-83420
- GNIS feature ID: 2397737
- Website: www.westville.us

Westville is a town in New Durham Township, LaPorte County, Indiana, United States. The population, as of the 2020 census is 5,257. It is included in the Michigan City, Indiana-La Porte, Indiana Metropolitan Statistical Area. Westville is located in Northwest Indiana, also known as The Region.

== History ==
Westville was platted in 1851, and incorporated as a town in 1864. It was a station and shipping point at the junction of two railroads.

Rev. John Milton Whitehead lived in Westville at the time of his enlistment as a chaplain in the 15th Indiana Infantry Regiment. Whitehead received the Medal of Honor for his actions at the Battle of Stones River when he "went to the front during a desperate contest and unaided carried to the rear several wounded and helpless soldiers."

The Everel S. Smith House was listed in the National Register of Historic Places in 1990.

== Geography ==
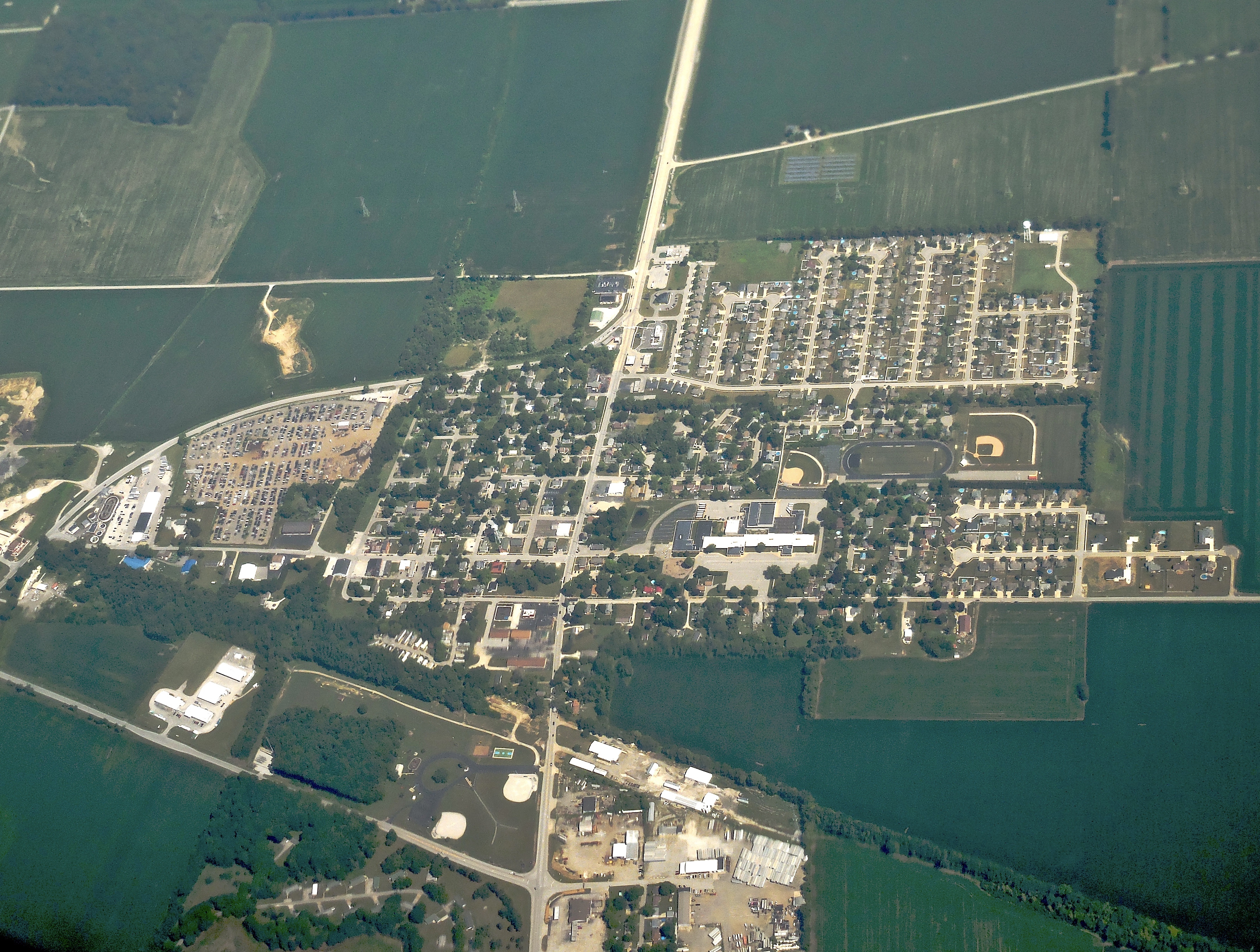
Aerial view of Westville

According to the 2010 census, Westville has a total area of 3.09 square miles (8.00 km^{2}), all land.

== Demographics ==
Historical population
Census	Pop.	Note	%±
1870	640		—
1880	627		−2.0%
1890	522		−16.7%
1900	468		−10.3%
1910	503		7.5%
1920	408		−18.9%
1930	496		21.6%
1940	523		5.4%
1950	624		19.3%
1960	789		26.4%
1970	2,614		231.3%
1980	2,887		10.4%
1990	2,255		−21.9%
2000	2,116		−6.2%
2010	5,853		176.6%
2020	5,257		−10.2%
U.S. Decennial Census

Note that the census data for 2010 and later include the Westville Correctional Facility.

=== 2020 census ===
As of the 2020 census, Westville had a population of 5,257. The median age was 36.8 years. 10.4% of residents were under the age of 18 and 7.6% of residents were 65 years of age or older. For every 100 females there were 338.1 males, and for every 100 females age 18 and over there were 404.9 males age 18 and over.

98.0% of residents lived in urban areas, while 2.0% lived in rural areas.

There were 1,011 households in Westville, of which 28.9% had children under the age of 18 living in them. Of all households, 38.8% were married-couple households, 20.4% were households with a male householder and no spouse or partner present, and 29.0% were households with a female householder and no spouse or partner present. About 30.3% of all households were made up of individuals and 12.6% had someone living alone who was 65 years of age or older.

There were 1,131 housing units, of which 10.6% were vacant. The homeowner vacancy rate was 2.2% and the rental vacancy rate was 16.1%.

Racial composition as of the 2020 census
Race	Number	Percent
White	3,752	71.4%
Black or African American	1,043	19.8%
American Indian and Alaska Native	7	0.1%
Asian	13	0.2%
Native Hawaiian and Other Pacific Islander	0	0.0%
Some other race	228	4.3%
Two or more races	214	4.1%
Hispanic or Latino (of any race)	342	6.5%

=== 2010 census ===
As of the census of 2010, there were 5,853 people, 1,093 households, and 705 families living in the town. The population density was 1,894.2 inhabitants per square mile (731.4/km^{2}). There were 1,186 housing units at an average density of 383.8 per square mile (148.2/km^{2}). The racial makeup of the town was 72.1% White, 25.1% African American, 0.2% Native American, 0.3% Asian, 1.6% from other races, and 0.7% from two or more races. Hispanic or Latino of any race were 6.3% of the population.

There were 1,093 households, of which 34.2% had children under the age of 18 living with them, 44.1% were married couples living together, 12.9% had a female householder with no husband present, 7.5% had a male householder with no wife present, and 35.5% were non-families. 29.2% of all households were made up of individuals, and 8.9% had someone living alone who was 65 years of age or older. The average household size was 2.45 and the average family size was 2.97.

The median age in the town was 33.1 years. 12% of residents were under the age of 18; 13.7% were between the ages of 18 and 24; 47.3% were from 25 to 44; 21.4% were from 45 to 64; and 5.5% were 65 years of age or older. The gender makeup of the town was 76.9% male and 23.1% female.

=== 2000 census ===
As of the census of 2000, there were 2,116 people, 897 households, and 556 families living in the town. The population density was 677.0 inhabitants per square mile (261.4/km^{2}). There were 984 housing units at an average density of 314.8 per square mile (121.5/km^{2}). The racial makeup of the town was 96.27% White, 1.23% African American, 0.28% Native American, 0.28% Asian, 0.71% from other races, and 1.23% from two or more races. Hispanic or Latino of any race were 0.90% of the population.

There were 898 households, out of which 30.8% had children under the age of 18 living with them, 45.4% were married couples living together, 12.0% had a female householder with no husband present, and 38.0% were non-families. 30.4% of all households were made up of individuals, and 11.0% had someone living alone who was 65 years of age or older. The average household size was 2.36 and the average family size was 2.93.

In the town, the population was spread out, with 26.0% under the age of 18, 8.1% from 18 to 24, 31.0% from 25 to 44, 23.1% from 45 to 64, and 11.7% who were 65 years of age or older. The median age was 36 years. For every 100 females, there were 96.1 males. For every 100 females age 18 and over, there were 95.1 males.

The median income for a household in the town was $36,761, and the median income for a family was $44,524. Males had a median income of $33,906 versus $21,525 for females. The per capita income for the town was $18,306. About 3.3% of families and 6.3% of the population were below the poverty line, including 6.0% of those under age 18 and 4.2% of those age 65 or over.

== Education ==
The school district is New Durham Township Metropolitan School District.

The town has a lending library, the Westville-New Durham Township Public Library. Westville residents may also request a free library card from any La Porte County Public Library branch. Purdue University Northwest's other campus, formerly Purdue North Central, is in Westville.

== Notable people ==
- William A. Shunk, US Army colonel whose commands included Commandant of the United States Army Command and General Staff College.
