= Marion Ridgeway Polygonal Barn =

- Ridgway, Marion, Polygonal Barn
- U.S. National Register of Historic Places
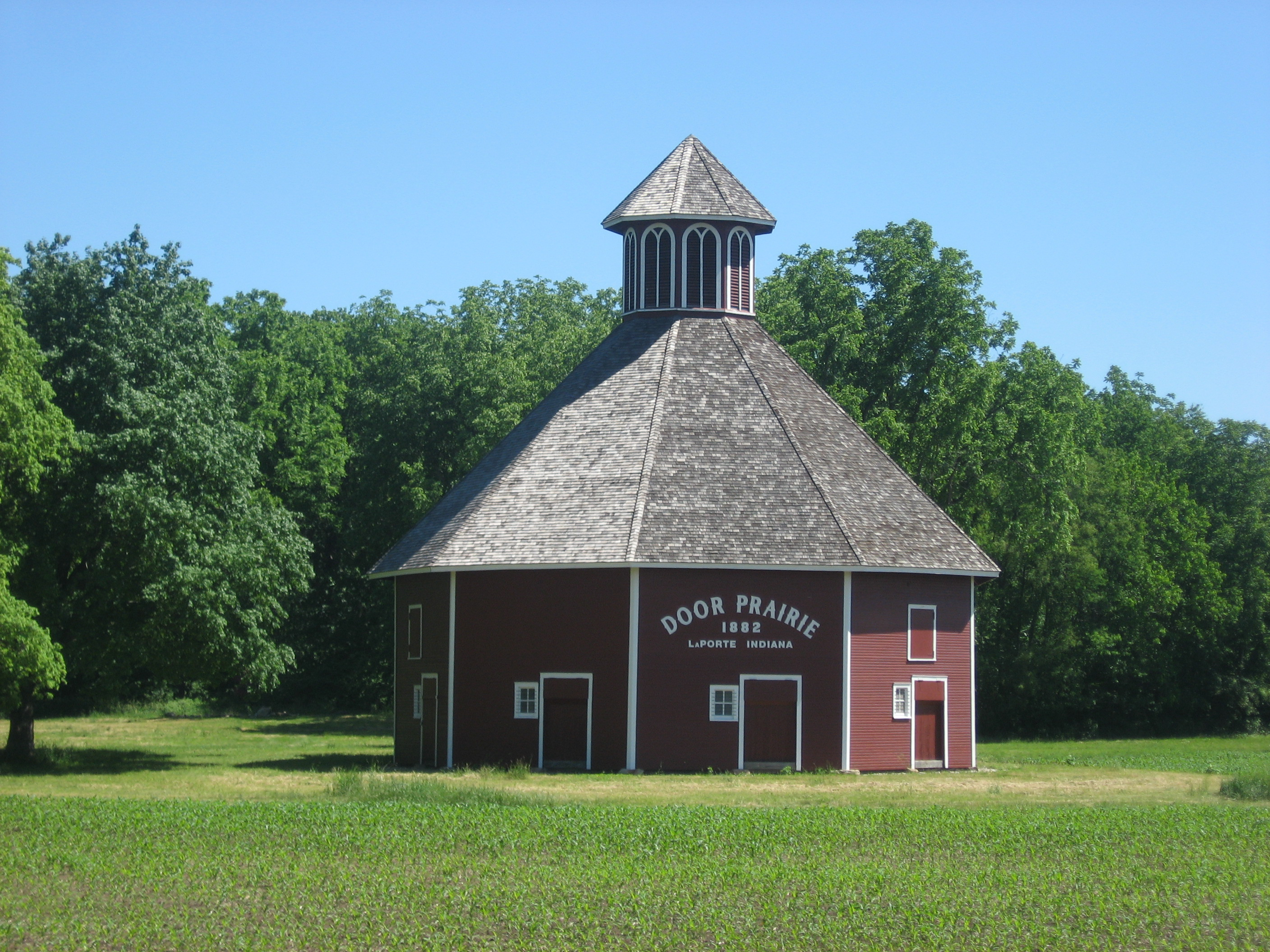
- Western side of the Marion Ridgeway Polygonal Barn

- Location within Indiana Location within the United States
- Location: IN 35 N of jct. with Crescent Dr., LaPorte, Indiana
- Coordinates: 41°35′24″N 86°42′9″W
- Area: less than one acre
- Built: 1878
- Built by: Ridgway, Marion
- Architectural style: Vernacular, 9 sided barn
- MPS: Round and Polygonal Barns of Indiana MPS
- NRHP reference No.: 93000464
- Added to NRHP: May 27, 1993

The Marion Ridgeway Polygonal Barn located in LaPorte County on the southern edge of LaPorte, Indiana, is a multi-sided barn. Built in 1882 by Marion Ridgeway and called the Door Prairie Barn. The barn sits east of highway 35 surrounded by woods and cultivated fields. The nine-sided barn is south of a rectangular barn. The barn has nine sides and is two stories tall. The roof is capped with a sectional cone roof with a nine-sided cupola in the Gothic Revival/Italianate style. Within the louvered panels trim pieces resemble a lancet arch. The post and beam frame sits on wooden sill propped on stone.

== Exterior ==
The roof is covered in wood shingles. There is an overhang, showing the rafters in the soffit area. The walls are covered with horizontal tongue-and-groove beveled siding. Corner boards at used where each wall section adjoins the next. The barn faces north and has a large sliding door located off center to the west on the lower level. There are long, narrow openings with operable wood shutters at each side of the wall section, with identical openings on the upper level. The upper level has a small hay door with a large hay dormer. The dormer has an out-swinging hay door with a hay pulley at the top. The dormer is capped by a steeply pitched gable roof with exposed rafters.

The first side, described above, is followed by side two with its window and four-foot-wide door. Side three has another window next to a door, and there is a smaller hay door on the upper level, above the window. Side four contains another window and door pair, while side five has the door and then the window with a smaller hay door above. Side six is roughly parallel to the road, has the door and window and on the upper level is painted: DOOR PRAIRIE 1878 LaPorte, Indiana. Side seven and eight both have doors and windows. Side eight has an upper-level hay door above the window. Side nine contains the final door-and-window combination. The combination of windows and doors is said to give the barn its name: "Door Prairie Barn". The name also is an associations with in LaPorte County, which means "Door." The county was named because of a natural "door" between the woods to the north and east and the prairie to the west and south. This section of the county is called Door Prairie. This doorway was a landmark on the Indian trail through the area. It became the site of Door Village.

== Interior ==
The interior is an arrangement of pens. On the lower level, the north end of the barn has the main entrance. To the east is a permanent stairway to the upper level. Symmetrically from this northern bay are eight equally spaced stalls, each with a gate at the barn's center and containing a door and window on the outer wall. At each of the points of intersection of the inner stall walls are large posts that extend to an overhead beam, which braces the floor joists of the upper level. The center of the barn is left open for movement of animals.

On the upper level, the bay to the east has a three-section grain bin. This bin corresponds to the size of the animal pen below and does not extend to the roof above. Each compartment has a grain chute from the upper to the lower level. A walkway provides access to the large hay doors and makes the moving of the hay and straw easier. Most of the upper level is open for the storage of hay and straw.

== Bibliography ==
- Hanou, John. Research compiled on Indiana's round and polygonal barns from 1986 to present. Archived at Historic Landmarks Foundation of Indiana, 340 West Michigan Street, Indianapolis, IN 46202.
- Intensive architectural survey of Indiana's round and polygonal barns. Conducted June to August 1991, conducted by Jerry McMahan, areawide survey of round and polygonal architectural and historical resources.
- Kesling, Dr. Peter C. Owner of the Ridgeway (Kesling) barn, LaPorte, Indiana Interviewed by Jerry McMahan, October 18, 1991.
- Soike, Lowell J. Without Right Angles, The Round Barns of Iowa. Des Moines, IA: Iowa State Historical Department, Office of Historic Preservation, 1983.
