= SS Muskegon =

Wooden-hulled freight vessel

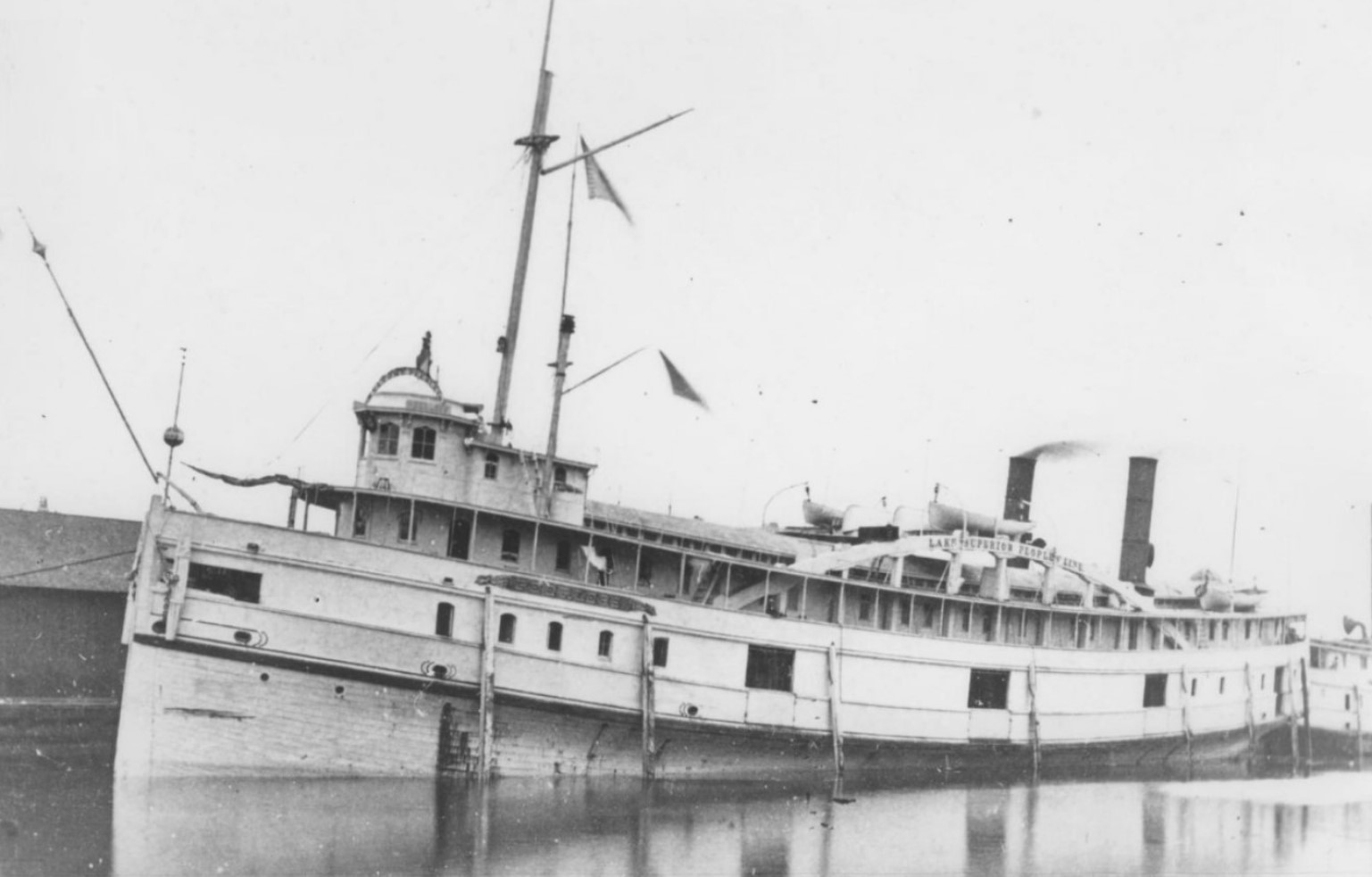
- The Muskegon prior to her sinking

History

United States
- Name: Peerless (1872-1907); Muskegon (1907-1910)
- Operator: Independent Sand Company
- Port of registry: United States, Chicago, Illinois
- Builder: Ira Lafrinnier, Cleveland, Ohio
- In service: July 3, 1872
- Out of service: October 6, 1910
- Identification: U.S. Registry #20470
- Fate: Burned off Michigan City, Indiana

General characteristics
- Class & type: Bulk Freighter
- Tonnage: 1275.57 Gross register tons
- Length: 220 ft (67 m) LOA; 211 ft (64 m) LBP
- Beam: 39.8 ft (12.1 m)
- Height: 32 ft (9.8 m)
- Draft: 23 ft (7.0 m)
- Installed power: 2 x Scotch marine boilers
- Propulsion: 700 horsepower High pressure condensing engine

National Register of Historic Places data
MUSKEGON Shipwreck Site
U.S. National Register of Historic Places
Location within Indiana Location within the United States
Location	Off the coast of Michigan City, Indiana, LaPorte County, Indiana
Nearest city	Michigan City, Indiana
Coordinates	41.716667°N 86.933333°W
Built	1872
Architect	Ira Lafrinnier
Architectural style	Steamship
NRHP reference No.	89000290
Added to NRHP	April 26, 1989

The SS Muskegon was a wooden hulled American passenger and package freight vessel that burned down on October 6, 1910 off the coast of Michigan City, Indiana in LaPorte County, Indiana, United States while unloading a cargo of sand. On April 26, 1989 the remains of the Muskegon were listed on the National Register of Historic Places.

== History ==
=== Design and construction ===
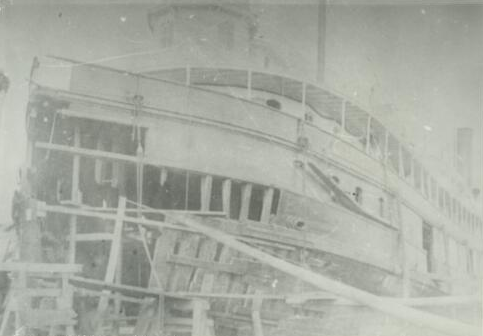
Construction of the Muskegon

The Muskegon was built as the Peerless in 1872, in Cleveland, Ohio by Ira Lafrinnier. She was launched on June 15, 1872. She had an overall length of 220 feet (67 m), and a between perpendiculars length of 211 feet (64 m). Her beam was 39.8 feet (12.1 m) wide, and her hull was 23 feet (7.0 m) deep. She had a gross tonnage of 1275.57 tons. She was powered by a 700 horsepower high pressure condensing engine, and fueled by two coal-fired firebox boilers. Both the engine and boilers were built by the Globe Iron Works of Cleveland, Ohio.

=== Service history ===
She entered service on July 3, 1872 with the Leopold & Austrian’s Lake Superior Line of Chicago, Illinois, and was given the registration number US20470. In September 1877 she jettisoned a cargo of flour, feed and sundries, about 26 of cattle and about 70 sheep.

The Peerless received repairs in August 1882. On November 26, 1884 she caught fire in Chicago, Illinois, and was repaired and overhauled the following year by the Chicago Dry Dock Company.

In November 1894 she was detained at Sault Ste. Marie, Michigan because of smallpox. In 1896 Peerless was sold to the Lake Michigan & Lake Superior Transportation Company of Chicago. On October 27, 1895 she broke her piston rod near St. Joseph, Michigan, and was rescued by the tug Perfection. In October 1898 her machinery became disabled, and she was towed to Marquette, Michigan. On September 7, 1899 the Peerless collided with the schooner A. Stewart and sank. She was raised four days later, and was repaired Howard's Bay, West Superior, Wisconsin.

In 1906 she was sold to the Chicago Transportation Company of Chicago. Around this time she was moored off Chicago, and used as a gambling vessel. In 1907 she was sold to the Muskegon & Chicago Navigation Company of Muskegon, Michigan, and was renamed Muskegon. In 1908 the Muskegon was converted to a bulk freighter by the Ship Owners Dry Dock Company of Chicago. In 1909 the Muskegon was sold to the Independent Sand Company of Chicago, she was also converted to a sandsucker in Muskegon.

=== Burning ===
On October 6, 1910, the Muskegon was unloading a cargo of sand at the Indiana Transportation Company's dock in Michigan City, Indiana, when a fire started in her hull. The fire was rumored to have been caused by a kerosene spillage near the boilers.

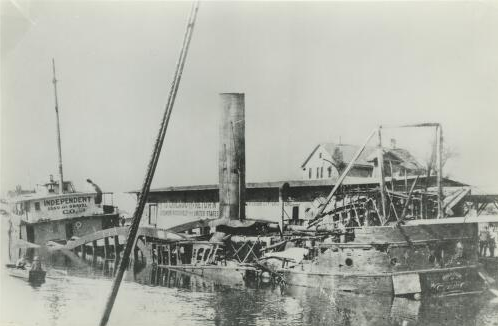
Wreck of the Muskegon

The Muskegon burned to the waterline, and sank at the dock, and remained there until June 10, 1911, when she was refloated and towed out to the harbour to be scuttled. After her loss, the Independent Sand Company used the insurance money they received to buy the sandsucker J.D. Marshall.

== The Muskegon today ==
Today, the remains of the Muskegon lie in 32 feet (9.8 m) of water. A lot of machinery remains at the site, including the boilers, the propeller and propeller shaft. Also on the wreck are a number of gears that were once part of the engine.

In 2024 the shipwreck site became an Indiana Shipwreck Nature Preserve.
