= WCOE =

FM radio station in La Porte, Indiana, U.S.

- La Porte, Indiana; United States
- Broadcast area: LaPorte County, Indiana
- Frequency: 96.7 MHz

Programming
- Format: Country music and local news
- Affiliations: ABC News

Ownership
- Owner: Spoon River Media, LLC
- Sister stations: WLOI

History
- First air date: 1964
- Call sign meaning: Named after station founder, Ken Coe

Technical information
- Licensing authority: FCC
- Facility ID: 36541
- Class: A
- ERP: 3,000 watts
- HAAT: 81.0 meters (265.7 ft)
- Transmitter coordinates: 41°37′55.00″N 86°45′43.00″W

Links
- Public license information: Public file; LMS
- Webcast: Listen Live
- Website: Official website

WCOE (96.7 FM) is a radio station licensed to La Porte, Indiana, United States. The station airs a country music format and is owned by Spoon River Media, LLC. It is a full-service station with said format, airing local news daily and high school football, boys basketball, and baseball from local school La Porte High School.
