= Door Village, Indiana =

- Unincorporated community
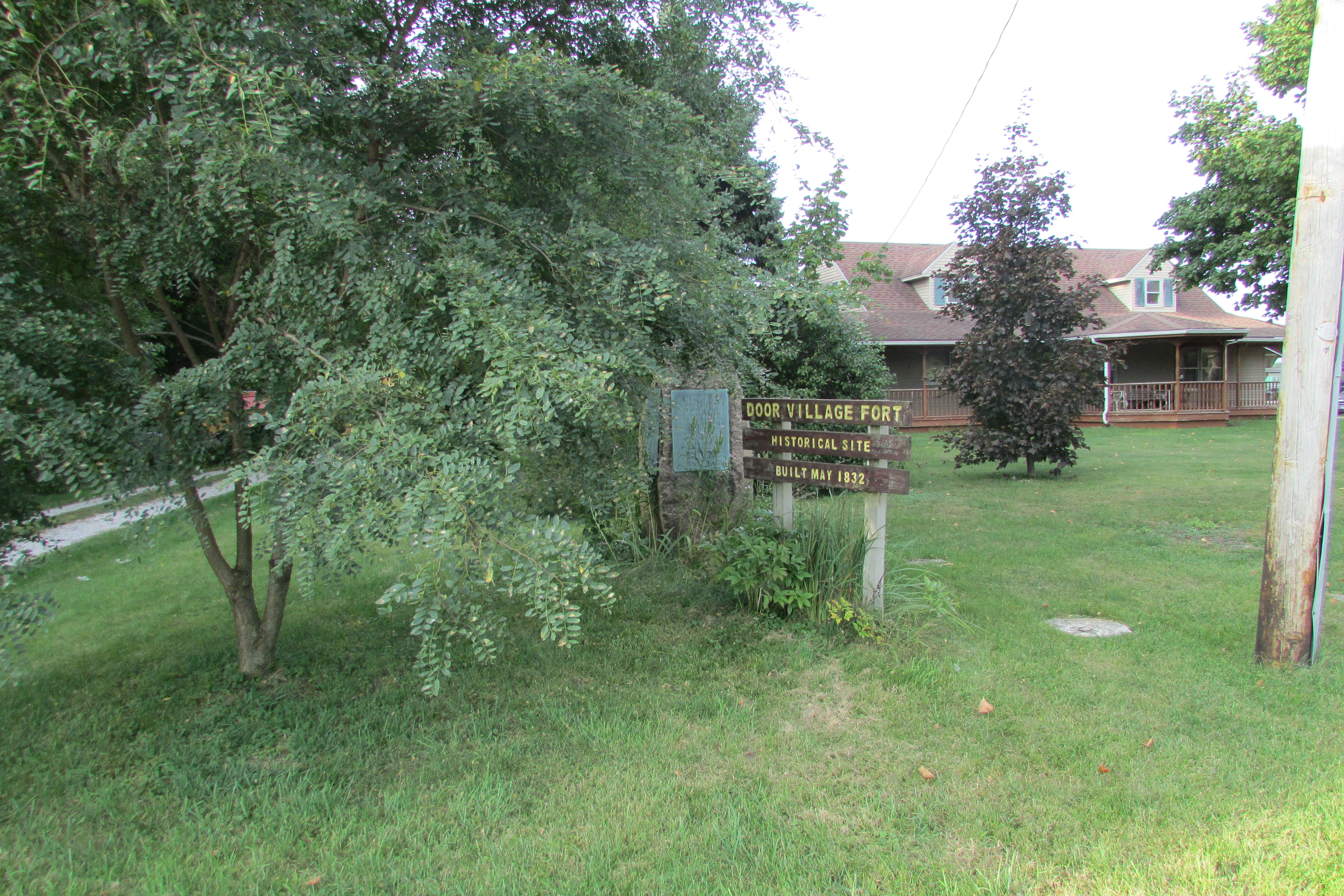
- Door Village Post site

- Location within Indiana Location within the United States
- Coordinates: 41°34′29″N 86°46′08″W
- Country: United States
- State: Indiana
- County: LaPorte
- Township: Scipio
- Elevation: 810 ft (250 m)
- ZIP code: 46350
- FIPS code: 18-18442
- GNIS feature ID: 450427

Door Village is an unincorporated community in Scipio Township, LaPorte County, Indiana. It was founded in 1836.

The site of the Old Fort at Door Village which was built in 1832 and a marker designates the site. A young man rode his Indian pony from Fort Dearborn to this part of the country to warn the settlers that Black Hawk and his Indians were coming on the warpath. The opening between the great forests which came down from the north and up from the south, was designated by the French voyageurs as "La Porte" or the door, from which La Porte County derived its name. The Marker is located on Joliet Road, on the north side near the intersection with Long Lane.

Joliet Road follows the Old Sauk Trail from the south side of present-day LaPorte to the Town Of Westville.
