= Francis H. Morrison House =

Historic house in Indiana, United States

- U.S. National Register of Historic Places
- U.S. Historic district – Contributing property
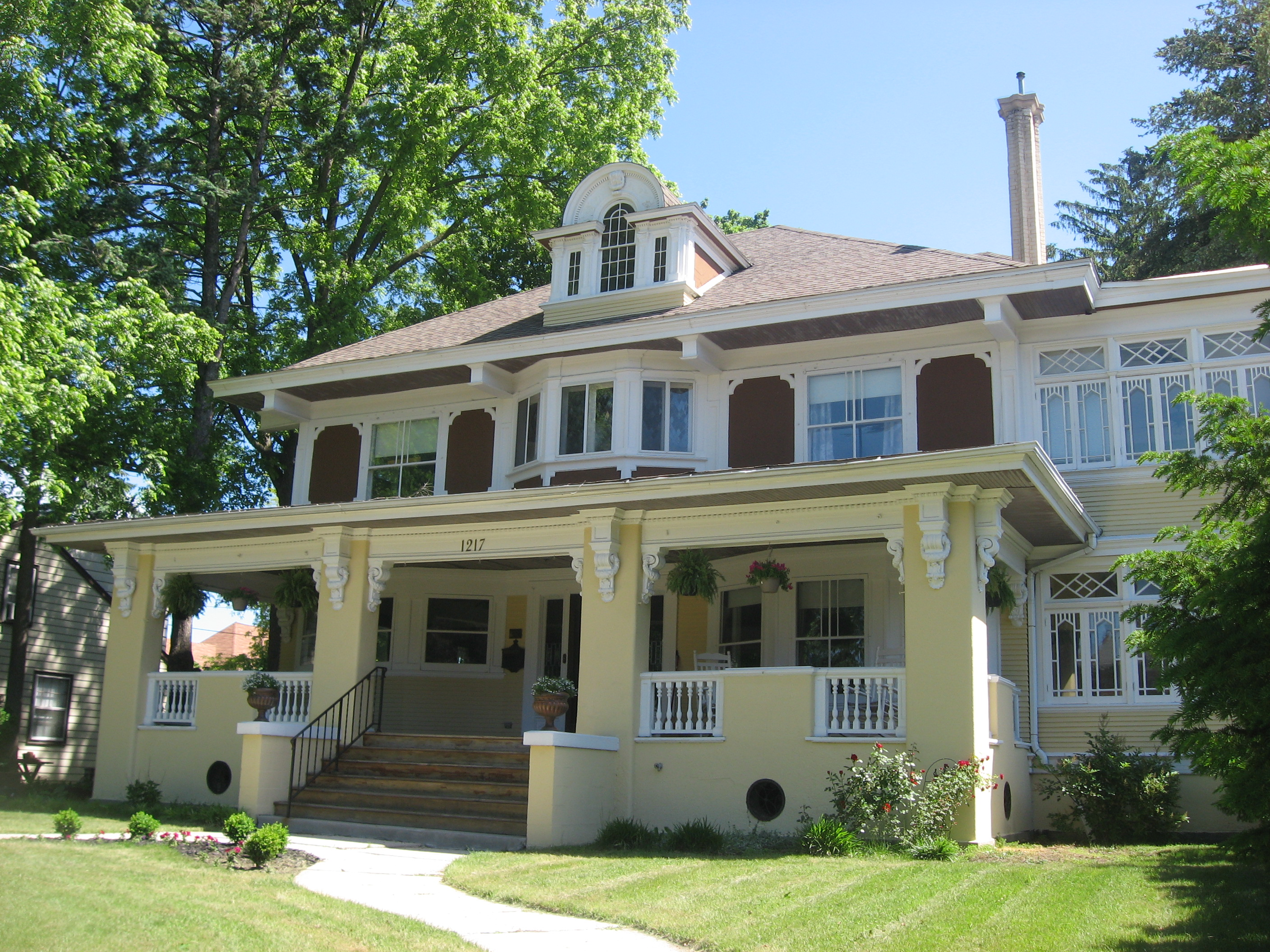
- Francis H. Morrison House, June 2013

- Location within Indiana Location within the United States
- Location: 1217 Michigan Ave., LaPorte, Indiana
- Coordinates: 41°36′23″N 86°43′0″W
- Area: less than one acre
- Built: 1904
- Architect: Stevens, Charles Whitney
- Architectural style: Late 19th And 20th Century Revivals, Eclectic Revival
- NRHP reference No.: 84000492
- Added to NRHP: December 6, 1984

Francis H. Morrison House is a historic home located at LaPorte, Indiana. It was built in 1904, and is a 2 1/2-story, frame dwelling in an eclectic combination of popular revival styles including Tudor Revival, Gothic Revival, Classical Revival, and American Craftsman. It has a hipped roof with dormers, a two-story sleeping porch, Palladian window, and stuccoed areas with curved corner pieces.

It was listed on the National Register of Historic Places in 1984. It is located in the Indiana and Michigan Avenues Historic District.
