= Everel S. Smith House =

Historic house in Indiana, United States

- U.S. National Register of Historic Places
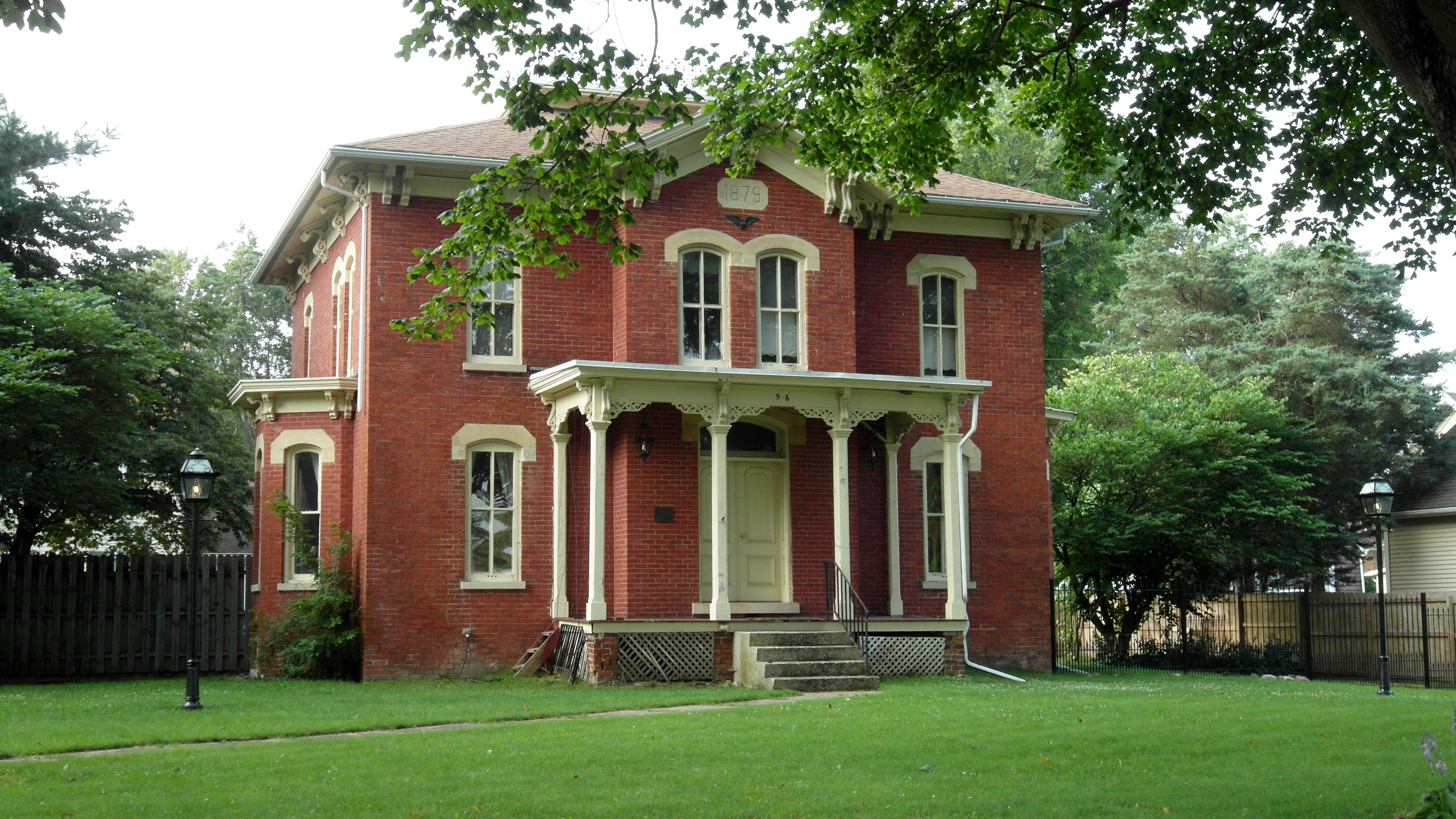
- Everel S. Smith House, Westville, Indiana

- Location within Indiana Location within the United States
- Location: 56 W. Jefferson St., Westville, Indiana
- Coordinates: 41°32′35″N 86°53′52″W
- Area: less than one acre
- Built: 1879
- Architectural style: Italianate
- NRHP reference No.: 90001794
- Added to NRHP: December 12, 1990

The Everel S. Smith House is located on the northeast corner of West Jefferson Street and Clyborn Avenue in Westville, Indiana and is set well back from the streets it fronts. The yard is landscaped with four large maples and one medium size tulip tree equally spaced along the road. There is an enclosed garden with patio (6 1 high, woven cypress fence, 32' X 32') on the west side beginning at the back of the bay and extending north and west. The house faces south and is of two story, red brick construction with ivory painted wood trim. Its design is Italianate with a single story wing on the north (rear) side. There is a hip roof on the main section capped by a widow's walk with a wrought iron fence around its perimeter. A gable is centered on a short extension of the center, front wall which has a limestone block with beveled corners set in its center above the second story windows that is inscribed with the date 1879. There is a black, cast, spread eagle below the inscribed stone.

== Exterior ==
The foundations and exterior walls are of three and four course brick. The large, open porch is on the front. The deck is supported by brick piers with a centrally located concrete stoop and steps with wrought iron railings. The porch has a flat roof supported by six square, beveledged wood columns. Carved wooden, scrolled knee braces support a roof overhang . Spaces between the porch's supporting piers below are closed with wood lattice work.

The main entrance is centrally located in a section of the front wall which extends about two feet out from the main wall. This extension rises to firm the gable above the second floor, mentioned earlier. The entrance consists of solid, wood paneled, double doors with limestone threshold and glazed transom capped by an arched, limestone label lintel. The windows have limestone sills and limestone label lintels. Windows, except those in the bays and basement, have wood storm windows with mullion set on limestone sill with top radius set in brick header, arched lintel. The second floor front is a duplication of the first floor but with two side by side windows in the center.

East elevation consists of 9 bays near the front and side by side windows near the rear. Both the east and west elevations have one story, semi-hexagonal bays a fourth of the way from the front. A cornice with brackets and flat roof completes the bay. Paired windows stand to the north of the bay. The second story has side by side windows over the bay and a single window above the paired windows. West elevation of the main section is a duplication of the east except there is but one window on the first floor nearer the rear. There is a wide wood frieze with center and top mouldings on the main section and wood soffit on the roof overhang with moulded wood eaves. There is one brick chimney which is located at the center of the exterior north wall of the main section. Its flue is built into this wall and originates in the basement.

== Interior ==
The front door opens into a small vestibule with doors set in angled walls. These rooms have a north–south partition with a large, arched doorway with three doors. Two are hinged together allowing opening the doorway to its full width. Behind the parlors are a library/den on the west side and a dining room on the east side. On the left side of the opening is the foot of a stairway, open on the dining room side, which ascends to a second floor landing.

The stairs are carved wood with rectangular newel post. It has a turned balustrade, and moulded, wood rail. The north side of the dining room has three doorways with cafe doors to the kitchen on the west. The center door is to a bathroom and the door on the east side accesses the sun porch. In the library/den there is a doorway to the kitchen at the east end. Other than the library/den most of the woodwork is painted with dark mahogany and/or light oak grain. Doors have white porcelain knobs and keyhole trims. There is no fireplace in the building. All windows including the bays have wood paneling. Ceiling height throughout the main section on both floors is ten feet.

Exterior walls in main section and wing are plaster on brick and the partitions and ceilings are plaster on wood lath on frame construction. Wall finishes are paint and wallpaper and floors and stairs are carpet.

The rear wing contains a kitchen with a seven-foot, six inch ceiling and a full bath. A hallway north of the bathroom leads to an exterior door to the sun porch on the east, and at that point another doorway in the north partition leads to a laundry room. The laundry gives access to a stairway leading to a large, floored attic through a trapdoor the length of the stairwell. In the northwest corner of the kitchen there are three stairs down to a landing which abuts exterior, double doors to the garden/patio. The sewing/all-purpose room is built on grade with a nine-foot false beam ceiling, has an exterior entrance on the west and a door to the garage in center of the exterior, north wall.

== Alterations ==
The building originally had three chimneys (two removed). Rain gutters were built in the roof eaves with external downspouts connected to a cistern under the kitchen wing. There was an entrance to a carriage storage room on the north end, west side of the wing (present grade entrance to wing.) Roofs were wood shake shingles. In the interior, the stairway to the second floor was closed with a door at its foot and an adjoining door to the east between west parlor and dining room.

== Bibliography ==
- Cass, Ruth A. Reminiscences of Westville. Publisher Unknown, 1981.
- Daniels, E. D. A Twentieth Century History and Biographical Record of LaPorte County, Indiana. Chicago's Lewis Publishing Co., 1904.
- History of LaPorte County, Indiana. Chicago: Chas. Chapman & Co., 1880.
- Indiana Historic Sites and Structures Inventory: LaPorte County Interim Report. Indianapolis: Historic Landmarks Foundation of Indiana, 1989
- Smith, Everel S. "Personal Journal." 1859–1867.
- Westville Centennial Souvenir Booklet. Publisher Unknown, 1951
