= Michigan Central Railroad Engine Repair Shops =

- Formerly listed on the U.S. National Register of Historic Places
- Location: 104 N. Franklin St., Michigan City, Indiana
- Area: 1 acre (0.40 ha)
- Built: 1851
- NRHP reference No.: 75000028

Significant dates
- Added to NRHP: May 12, 1975
- Removed from NRHP: August 11, 1978

Michigan Central Railroad Engine Repair Shops, also known as the Tonn and Blank Building, was a historic railroad engine repair building located at Michigan City, Indiana. It was built in 1851–1852 by the Michigan Central Railroad. It was constructed of Joliet limestone and measured 255 feet long and 62 feet wide. It has been demolished.

It was listed on the National Register of Historic Places in 1975 and delisted in 1978.
