= Indiana and Michigan Avenues Historic District =

Historic district in Indiana, United States

- U.S. National Register of Historic Places
- U.S. Historic district
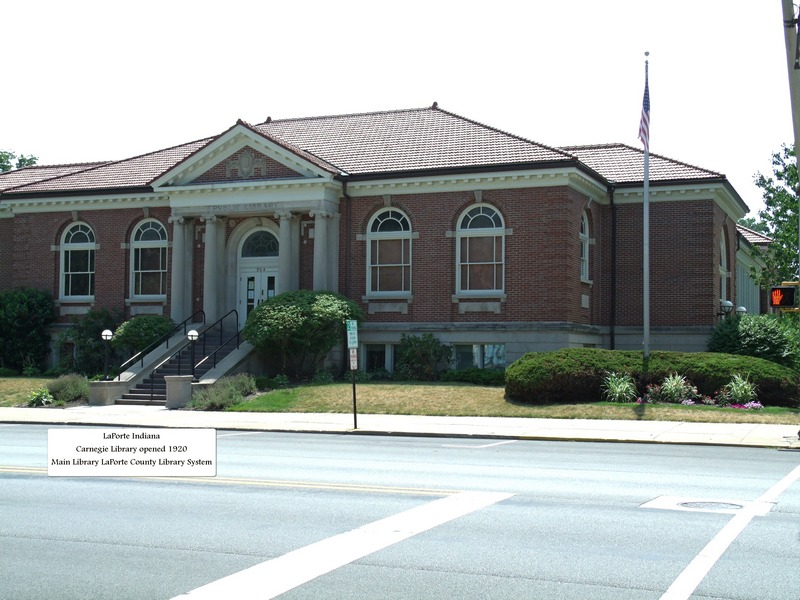
- LaPorte Carnegie Library, July 2012

- Location within Indiana Location within the United States
- Location: Roughly Indiana and Michigan between Maple and Kingsbury Aves., LaPorte, Indiana
- Coordinates: 41°36′20″N 86°43′00″W
- Area: 107 acres (43 ha)
- Architectural style: Italianate, Queen Anne, Colonial Revival, Prairie School, Bungalow/Craftsman
- NRHP reference No.: 14000807
- Added to NRHP: September 30, 2014

Indiana and Michigan Avenues Historic District is a national historic district located at LaPorte, Indiana. The district encompasses 223 contributing buildings and one contributing site in a predominantly residential section of LaPorte. It developed between about 1860 and 1963, and includes examples of Italianate, Queen Anne, Colonial Revival, Prairie School, and Bungalow / American Craftsman style architecture. Located in the district is the separately listed Francis H. Morrison House. Other notable buildings include the Hobart M. Cable, Jr., House (c. 1925), Rear Admiral R. R. Ingersoll Residence (1908), John Secor House (c. 1890), Swan-Anderson House (1870), Carnegie Library (1920), Emmett Scott House (1915), Frank Osborn House (c. 1895), Henry McGill House (c. 1863, 1881), First Presbyterian Church (1862), Winn House (c. 1875), First Church of Christ Scientist (c 1890, 1920), and St. Paul's Episcopal Church (1895–1898).

It was listed in the National Register of Historic Places in 2014.
