= New Durham Township, LaPorte County, Indiana =

New Durham Township
- Township
- Coordinates: 41°33′59″N 86°52′21″W
- Country: United States
- State: Indiana
- County: LaPorte

Government
  - Type: Indiana township

Area
  - Total: 36.06 sq mi (93.4 km^{2})
  - Land: 35.96 sq mi (93.1 km^{2})
  - Water: 0.1 sq mi (0.26 km^{2})
- Elevation: 830 ft (253 m)

Population (2020)
  - Total: 8,105
  - Density: 240.9/sq mi (93.0/km^{2})
- FIPS code: 18-52830
- GNIS feature ID: 453663

New Durham Township is one of twenty-one townships in LaPorte County, Indiana. As of the 2020 census, its population was 8,105 (down from 8,664 at 2010) and it contained 2,351 housing units.

== History ==
An early settler being a native of Durham, New York, caused the name to be selected.

The Pinhook Methodist Church and Cemetery was listed in the National Register of Historic Places in 2009.

== Geography ==
According to the 2010 census, the township has a total area of 36.06 square miles (93.4 km^{2}), of which 35.96 square miles (93.1 km^{2}) (or 99.72%) is land and 0.1 square miles (0.26 km^{2}) (or 0.28%) is water.

== Education ==
New Durham Township is served by the Westville-New Durham Township Public Library. Township residents may also request a free library card from any La Porte County Public Library branch.
