= Center Township, LaPorte County, Indiana =

Center Township
- Township
- Coordinates: 41°38′23″N 86°45′24″W
- Country: United States
- State: Indiana
- County: LaPorte

Government
  - Type: Indiana township

Area
  - Total: 32.96 sq mi (85.4 km^{2})
  - Land: 30.98 sq mi (80.2 km^{2})
  - Water: 1.98 sq mi (5.1 km^{2})
- Elevation: 850 ft (259 m)

Population (2020)
  - Total: 25,274
  - Density: 809.4/sq mi (312.5/km^{2})
- FIPS code: 18-11494
- GNIS feature ID: 453185

Center Township is one of twenty-one townships in LaPorte County, Indiana. As of the 2020 census, its population was 25,274 (up from 25,075 at 2010) and it contained 10,055 housing units.

== History ==
Center Township (also historically spelled Centre) was established in 1833. It was named from its position near the geographical center of LaPorte County.

== Geography ==
According to the 2010 census, the township has a total area of 32.96 square miles (85.4 km^{2}), of which 30.98 square miles (80.2 km^{2}) (or 93.99%) is land and 1.98 square miles (5.1 km^{2}) (or 6.01%) is water.
