= La Porte, Indiana =

- City
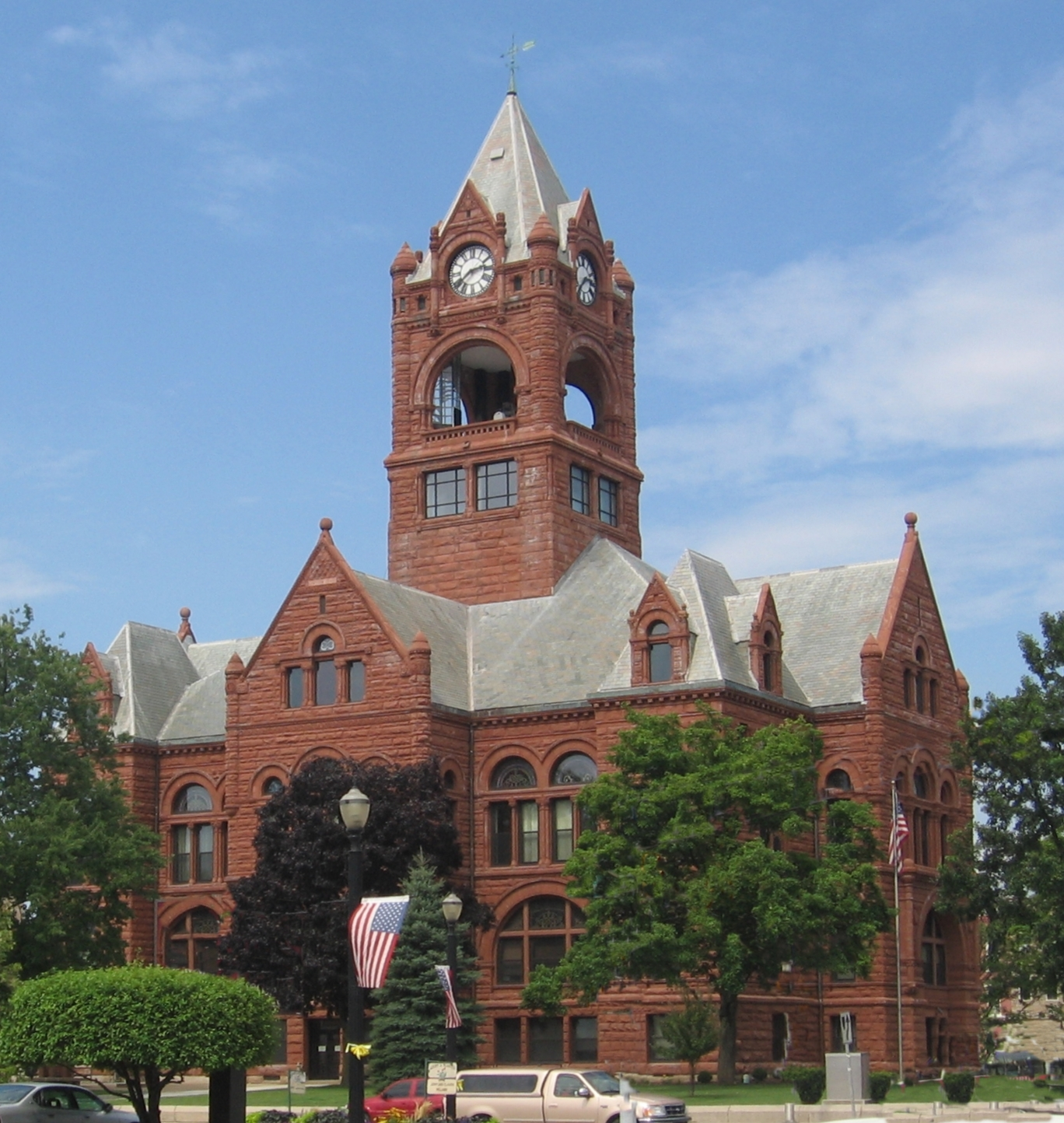
- LaPorte County Courthouse

- Flag Icon
- Etymology: from French 'the door'
- Nickname: The Maple City
- Motto(s): "Live and Love", "The Door to the Future" (motto on the city flag)
- Location of La Porte in LaPorte County, Indiana
- Coordinates: 41°36′48″N 86°43′03″W
- Country: United States
- State: Indiana
- County: LaPorte
- Townships: Center, Kankakee, Pleasant, Scipio
- Founded: 1832
- Incorporated (town): 1835
- Incorporated (city): 1852

Government
  - Mayor: Tom Dermody (R)

Area
  - Total: 12.68 sq mi (32.84 km^{2})
  - Land: 11.92 sq mi (30.88 km^{2})
  - Water: 0.76 sq mi (1.97 km^{2})
- Elevation: 801 ft (244 m)

Population (2020)
  - Total: 22,471
  - Density: 1,884.9/sq mi (727.77/km^{2})
- Time zone: UTC−6 (CST)
  - Summer (DST): UTC−5 (CDT)
- ZIP codes: 46350, 46352
- Area code: 219
- FIPS code: 18-42246
- GNIS feature ID: 2395570
- Website: www.cityoflaporte.com

La Porte (from French 'the door') is a city in LaPorte County, Indiana, United States, of which it is the county seat. Its population was estimated to be 21,341 in 2022. It is one of the two principal cities of the Michigan City-La Porte, Indiana metropolitan statistical area, which is included in the Chicago–Naperville–Michigan City, Illinois–Indiana–Wisconsin combined statistical area.

La Porte is located in northwest Indiana, east of Gary, and west of South Bend. It was first settled by European Americans in 1832. The city is twinned with Grangemouth in Scotland.

== History ==
The settlement of La Porte was established in July 1832. Abraham P. Andrew, one of the purchasers of the site, constructed the first sawmill in that year. The first settler arrived in October, building a permanent cabin just north of what would become the courthouse square.

After the US extinguished land claims by the Potowatomi and other historic tribes of the area by treaty and removal to Indian Territory, in 1833, a federal land office was established in La Porte. People came to this office from newly established surrounding counties to buy land from the government, including Solon Robinson, founder of Crown Point. The office was moved to Winamac in 1839.

By 1835, the settlement had grown to the extent that La Porte was incorporated as a town. A newspaper was established in 1836. La Porte Medical School was founded in 1842.

By 1852, La Porte had become a well-established settlement of considerable size for its time and vicinity, with 5,000 residents. In that same year, it was granted a city charter by the Indiana General Assembly, and the first mayor was elected. La Porte continued to grow, attracting numerous, diverse industries, the largest of which became the Advance-Rumely Company. Advance-Rumely developed and manufactured the Oil-Pull tractor engine, considered to have played a pivotal role in the agricultural development of the Great Plains. By 1869, Advance-Rumely was the largest employer in La Porte.

During the 1850s, numerous maple trees were planted along Indiana and Michigan Avenues in the city by local resident Sebastian Lay. Subsequently, La Porte became known as the "Maple City". Today, Indiana and Michigan Avenues comprise a historic district in the city, containing many homes and other structures of architectural and historical interest. Between 1892 and 1894, the third and current LaPorte county courthouse was erected at a cost of $300,000. The structure is built of red sandstone from Lake Superior, shipped by boat to Michigan City and then by rail to La Porte. The courthouse is considered to be one of La Porte's best-known structures. In 2007 the exterior of the building was extensively restored at a cost of $2.9 million.

=== Historic sites districts ===
- Downtown LaPorte Historic District
- Francis H. Morrison House
- Indiana and Michigan Avenues Historic District
- Marion Ridgeway Polygonal Barn

== Geography ==
According to the 2010 census, La Porte has a total area of 12.37 square miles (32.04 km^{2}), of which 0.71 square miles (1.84 km^{2}) (or 5.74%) is covered by water. U.S. 35 passes through La Porte.

La Porte is accessible from Chicago by the South Shore train line, which begins at Millennium Station and ends in South Bend, Indiana, with several stops in between, including Chesterton and Hudson Lake, Indiana. Both are only a short drive from La Porte.

=== Climate ===
Climate data for LaPorte, Indiana (1991–2020 normals, extremes 1897–1901, 1948–present)
Month	Jan	Feb	Mar	Apr	May	Jun	Jul	Aug	Sep	Oct	Nov	Dec	Year
Record high °F (°C)	69 (21)	71 (22)	85 (29)	94 (34)	97 (36)	102 (39)	102 (39)	103 (39)	104 (40)	92 (33)	84 (29)	72 (22)	104 (40)
Mean maximum °F (°C)	52.9 (11.6)	56.1 (13.4)	70.3 (21.3)	79.4 (26.3)	87.1 (30.6)	91.6 (33.1)	92.4 (33.6)	90.8 (32.7)	88.4 (31.3)	81.5 (27.5)	66.8 (19.3)	55.5 (13.1)	94.1 (34.5)
Mean daily maximum °F (°C)	31.2 (−0.4)	35.1 (1.7)	46.0 (7.8)	58.8 (14.9)	70.0 (21.1)	78.9 (26.1)	82.1 (27.8)	80.3 (26.8)	74.4 (23.6)	62.0 (16.7)	47.7 (8.7)	36.2 (2.3)	58.6 (14.8)
Daily mean °F (°C)	24.2 (−4.3)	27.7 (−2.4)	37.4 (3.0)	49.0 (9.4)	60.0 (15.6)	69.3 (20.7)	73.1 (22.8)	71.5 (21.9)	64.8 (18.2)	53.0 (11.7)	40.3 (4.6)	29.9 (−1.2)	50.0 (10.0)
Mean daily minimum °F (°C)	17.3 (−8.2)	20.3 (−6.5)	28.7 (−1.8)	39.3 (4.1)	50.0 (10.0)	59.7 (15.4)	64.0 (17.8)	62.8 (17.1)	55.2 (12.9)	43.9 (6.6)	32.9 (0.5)	23.5 (−4.7)	41.5 (5.3)
Mean minimum °F (°C)	−3.8 (−19.9)	2.2 (−16.6)	12.6 (−10.8)	26.4 (−3.1)	37.4 (3.0)	47.5 (8.6)	54.8 (12.7)	53.6 (12.0)	42.7 (5.9)	31.5 (−0.3)	19.6 (−6.9)	4.9 (−15.1)	−7.5 (−21.9)
Record low °F (°C)	−23 (−31)	−23 (−31)	−6 (−21)	13 (−11)	23 (−5)	36 (2)	43 (6)	38 (3)	28 (−2)	19 (−7)	−7 (−22)	−22 (−30)	−23 (−31)
Average precipitation inches (mm)	3.01 (76)	2.52 (64)	2.70 (69)	3.77 (96)	4.33 (110)	4.38 (111)	4.04 (103)	4.22 (107)	3.38 (86)	4.11 (104)	3.24 (82)	2.85 (72)	42.55 (1,081)
Average snowfall inches (cm)	23.0 (58)	16.0 (41)	7.1 (18)	1.1 (2.8)	0.0 (0.0)	0.0 (0.0)	0.0 (0.0)	0.0 (0.0)	0.0 (0.0)	0.2 (0.51)	4.0 (10)	13.8 (35)	65.2 (166)
Average precipitation days (≥ 0.01 in)	16.7	12.6	12.5	12.7	13.2	11.0	10.1	9.8	9.6	12.3	13.0	14.8	148.3
Average snowy days (≥ 0.1 in)	12.0	8.8	4.5	1.2	0.0	0.0	0.0	0.0	0.0	0.3	2.9	8.5	38.2
Source: NOAA

== Demographics ==
Historical population
Census	Pop.	Note	%±
1850	1,824		—
1860	5,028		175.7%
1870	6,581		30.9%
1880	6,195		−5.9%
1890	7,126		15.0%
1900	7,113		−0.2%
1910	10,525		48.0%
1920	15,158		44.0%
1930	15,755		3.9%
1940	16,180		2.7%
1950	17,882		10.5%
1960	21,157		18.3%
1970	22,140		4.6%
1980	21,796		−1.6%
1990	21,507		−1.3%
2000	21,621		0.5%
2010	22,053		2.0%
2020	22,471		1.9%
Source: US Census Bureau

=== 2020 census ===
As of the 2020 census, La Porte had a population of 22,471. The median age was 37.5 years. 24.1% of residents were under the age of 18 and 17.7% of residents were 65 years of age or older. For every 100 females there were 93.9 males, and for every 100 females age 18 and over there were 91.4 males age 18 and over.

98.8% of residents lived in urban areas, while 1.2% lived in rural areas.

There were 9,135 households in La Porte, of which 29.9% had children under the age of 18 living in them. Of all households, 36.3% were married-couple households, 21.1% were households with a male householder and no spouse or partner present, and 33.2% were households with a female householder and no spouse or partner present. About 34.1% of all households were made up of individuals and 15.1% had someone living alone who was 65 years of age or older.

There were 10,153 housing units, of which 10.0% were vacant. The homeowner vacancy rate was 1.8% and the rental vacancy rate was 8.0%.

Racial composition as of the 2020 census
Race	Number	Percent
White	18,231	81.1%
Black or African American	891	4.0%
American Indian and Alaska Native	103	0.5%
Asian	161	0.7%
Native Hawaiian and Other Pacific Islander	6	0.0%
Some other race	1,393	6.2%
Two or more races	1,686	7.5%
Hispanic or Latino (of any race)	2,871	12.8%

=== 2010 census ===
As of the census of 2010, 22,053 people, 8,962 households, and 5,362 families resided in the city. The population density was 1,891.3 inhabitants per square mile (730.2/km^{2}). The 9,992 housing units had an average density of 856.9 per square mile (330.9/km^{2}). The racial makeup of the city was 83.1% White, 3.6% African American, 0.2% Native American, 0.2% Asian, 12.9% from other or unknown races, and 7.5% from two or more races. Hispanics or Latinos of any race were 12% of the population.

Of the 8,962 households, 31.6% had children under 18 living with them, 39.2% were married couples living together, 14.9% had a female householder with no husband present, 5.8% had a male householder with no wife present, and 40.2% were not families. About 33.0% of all households were made up of individuals, and 14.6% had someone living alone who was 65 or older. The average household size was 2.39, and the average family size was 3.04. The median age in the city was 36.2 years. 24.5% of residents were under 18; 9.5% were between 18 and 24; 26.7% were from 25 to 44; 24.2% were from 45 to 64; and 15.3% were 65 or older. The gender makeup of the city was 48.2% male and 51.8% female.

=== 2000 census ===
As of the census of 2000, 21,621 people, 8,916 households, and 5,545 families lived in the city. The population density was 1,886.8/sq mi (728.5/km^{2}). The 9,667 housing units had an average density of 843.6/sq mi (325.7/km^{2}). The racial makeup of the city was 92.6% White, 1.92% African American, 0.37% Native American, 0.38% Asian, 3.39% from other races, and 1.33% from two or more races. Hispanic or Latino people of any race were 6.52% of the population.

Of the 8,916 households, 29.8% had children under 18 living with them, 45.4% were married couples living together, 12.3% had a female householder with no husband present, and 37.8% were not families. About 31.9% of all households were made up of individuals, and 14.4% had someone living alone who was 65 or older. The average household size was 2.36, and the average family size was 2.98.

In the city, the age distribution was 24.5% under 18, 9.6% from 18 to 24, 29.1% from 25 to 44, 20.3% from 45 to 64, and 16.7% who were 65 or older. The median age was 36 years. For every 100 females, there were 93.5 males. For every 100 females age 18 and over, there were 90.1 males.

The median income for a household in the city was $35,376, and for a family was $45,784. Males had a median income of $32,319 versus $22,756 for females. The per capita income for the city was $17,900. About 7.7% of families and 11.0% of the population were below the poverty line, including 13.2% of those under 18 and 13.1% of those 65 or over.

== Government ==
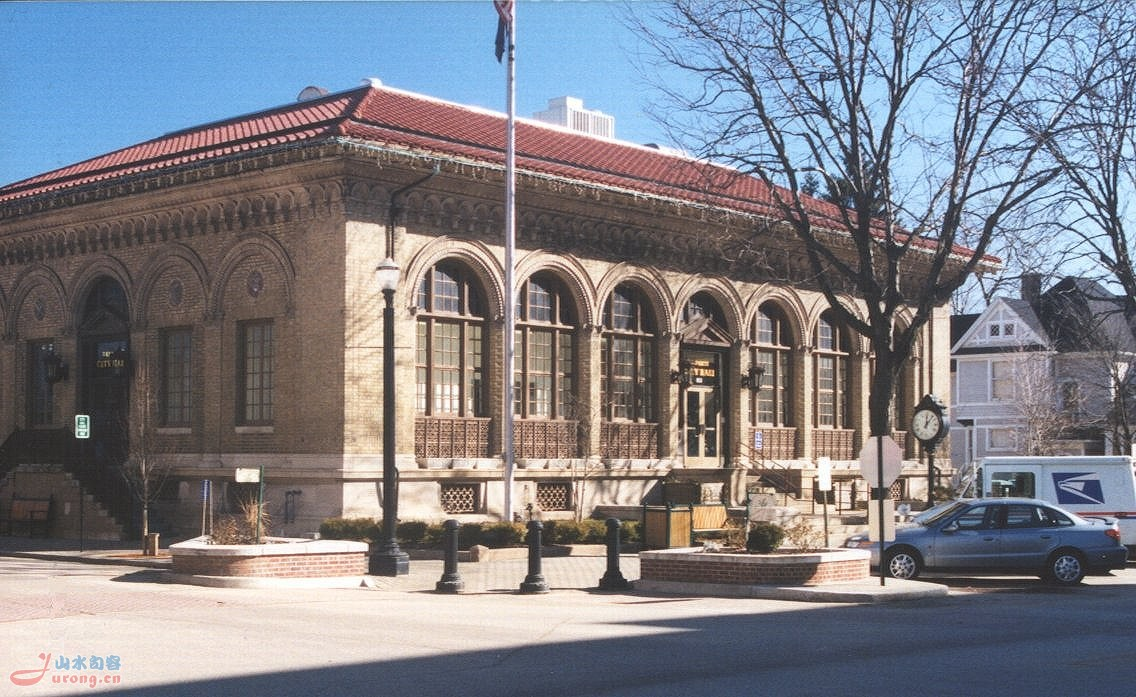
La Porte City Hall

The government consists of a mayor and a city council. The mayor and two council members are elected in a citywide (at-large) vote. Five of the seven city council members are elected from individual districts. The city has a three-member Board of Public Works and Safety. Its responsibilities include reviewing and approving contracts, hearing citizen complaints, and making decisions concerning public-works facilities and public safety.

== Education ==
The La Porte Community School Corporation, which covers the majority of La Porte, serves about 6,500 students.

A portion of the city to the northeast is in New Prairie United School Corporation.

=== Primary and secondary education ===
- Public schools
  - LaPorte Community School Corporation
    - LaPorte High School
    - La Porte Middle School
    - Kesling Intermediate School
    - Crichfield Elementary
    - Hailmann Elementary
    - Handley Elementary
    - Indian Trail Elementary
    - Kingsbury Elementary
    - Kingsford Heights Elementary
    - Riley Elementary
    - South LaPorte County Special Education Cooperative
- Private schools
  - La Lumiere School (9–12)
  - Saint John Lutheran School (K–8)
  - St. Joseph's School (PK–5) – closed June, 2012
  - Door Prairie Adventist Christian School (PK–8)
  - Renaissance Academy (PK–8)

With eight state baseball titles, La Porte High School holds the distinction of winning the greatest number in Indiana.

=== Higher education ===
La Porte County, of which the city of La Porte is the county seat, has a campus of Purdue University Northwest in Westville. The campus is 11 miles west of the city of La Porte.

=== Public library ===
The La Porte Public Library is a public library, and a branch of the La Porte County Public Library.

== Features ==
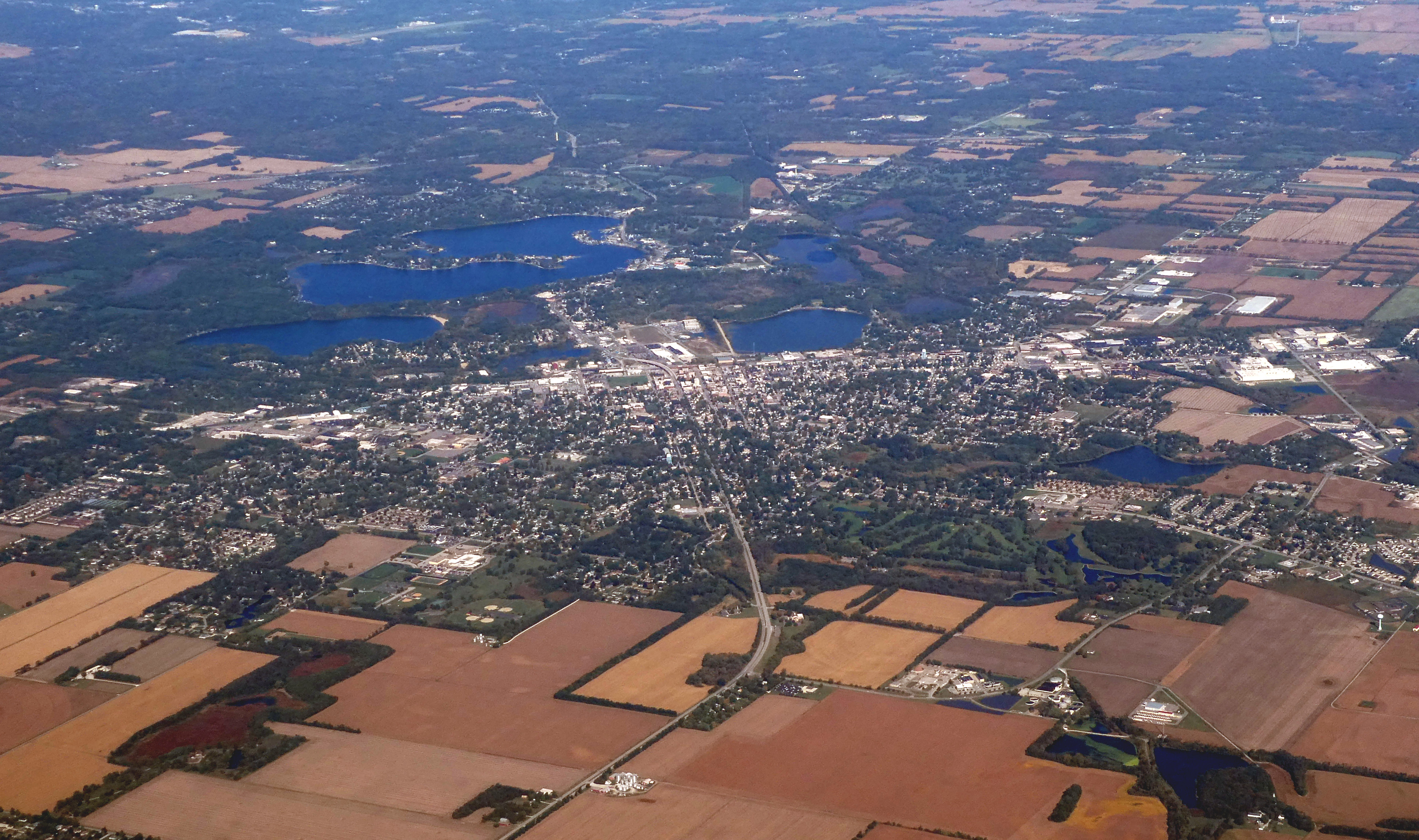
La Porte

The Advance-Rumely tractor company, established in La Porte, developed steam engines and eponymous green kerosene tractors.

La Porte has been featured in occasional movies, including Prancer (1989), A Piece of Eden (2000), Treadmill (2006), Providence (2009), and Women's Prison (2009).

La Porte was once the home of the Parsons Horological Institute, founded in the 1890s and still extant as part of Bradley University in Peoria, Illinois.

La Porte was the eastern terminus of the Chicago – New York Electric Air Line Railroad, an ambitious early high-speed rail project.

Author J. K. Rowling has a Portkey (key to the city) for La Porte. It was presented to her by Emerson Spartz.

=== Places of interest ===
Places of interest include the Indiana and Michigan Avenues Historic District, Downtown LaPorte Historic District, Francis H. Morrison House and Marion Ridgeway Polygonal Barn, all of which are listed in the National Register of Historic Places.

La Porte Little Theatre Club, a live community theatre group, was founded in 1925. LaPorte County Historical Society features several historic displays, including the Kesling Automobile Collection of more than 30 vintage and rare automobiles.

== Parks and recreation ==
La Porte has an extensive city park district.

- Allesee Park (Boyd Boulevard) is a 6-acre neighborhood park on the south side of the city. It was developed adjacent to a housing subdivision to provide recreational facilities to the neighborhood. The park was named after George Allesee Sr (1898–1968), longtime physical director of the La Porte YMCA who also broadcast La Porte Slicers Games on the Radio for 50 years. The park includes a baseball diamond, basketball half-court, benches, parking, playground, and walking track. Improvements were made in 2000 thanks to a donation by one of his sons to the La Porte Park Foundation.
- Ben Rees Park (Scott Street) is a 1.5-acre parcel that is half of a square block located near the Civic Auditorium. The park was the site of the Fourth Ward School in the early 1900s. The school was demolished in the 1920s and the property was donated to the city in the 1940s. The park was named in honor of Ben C. Rees, a local attorney and school board member. A new playground, basketball court and gazebo shelter were installed through the help of community volunteers and contributions.
- Bill Reed Tennis Complex (2150 A Street) features several tennis courts, parking, water fountains and a pavilion.
- Charles W. Lindewald Park (Park Street) is considered La Porte's first park. A parcel of land, 9.4 acres on Lower Lake, was purchased in 1890. The original parcel contained a notable grove of white oaks, of which a few stands of this native timber still remains. Facilities include a picnic shelter with grills, playground, restrooms, water fountains, ball diamond, basketball half-court and 12 lighted horseshoe pits, which are home to the La Porte Horseshoe Pitches Association.
- Clarke Field (Farrand Avenue) is a two square block area of 6 acres which was donated to the city in the late 1930s. The park is generally surrounded with tall, mature fir evergreen trees that provide a buffer for the adjacent residential areas. The main recreational usage at Clarke Field are two ball diamonds, one used primarily by the La Porte High School junior varsity and La Porte Babe Ruth Baseball and the other for younger age levels. The park also contains a playground, ball diamonds, a concession stand, water fountains, and public restrooms.
- Fox Memorial Park (Truesdale Avenue), originally started in 1911 with only 15 acres, has grown today to 170 acres. In the early 1900s, flowers, shrubs, and trees were planted to further beautify the hills of mature oak, hawthorn and wild apple. The entire park was landscaped and strolling paths developed. Fox Memorial Park includes Clear Lake, which encompasses approximately 100 acres of the total park. The trees planted in the early 1900s have matured and additional recreational facilities have been developed at the park. The park has ball diamonds, including Ron Reed Field; basketball; playgrounds; picnic shelters with grills; fishing; boating; water fountains; walking and fitness trials; and Thrills ‘n’ Spills Skate Park. The park also contains the Dennis F. Smith Amphitheatre, home to events such as the Arts in the Park program.
- Hastings Park (Monroe St.) is a small park, featuring a playground and benches.
- Kesling Park (2150 A Street) is located on the southern edge of the community. It started with a small 2-acre land donation and has since grown through additional donations by the Kesling family to the present day size of 90 acres. Today, residents from all of La Porte enjoy the modern facilities including four ball diamonds, six tennis courts, a walking and nature trail, soccer fields, basketball courts, sledding hill and picnic shelters. The park also contains Fort La Play Porte, a large community-built playground.
- Koomler Park (Miller Street) covers 4 acres in southern La Porte. It was initially a play area developed by the federal government in the 1940s for children of the workers at the Kingsbury Ordinance Plant. In 1962, this land was transferred to the city for exclusive use as a park. Today, Koomler Park serves the residents of Maple Terrace and offers a ball diamond, basketball court and playground.
- LaPark (1st Street) is adjacent to Bethany Lutheran Church.
- Rumley Park (Home Street) is a 4-acre neighborhood park that was purchased and developed entirely with federal funds in 1980. It was actually a replacement park for the former Marquette Park, which was located four blocks away. Marquette Park was a piece of donated land that was unsuitable and unbuildable for a park. Rumley Park offers a basketball court, playground, picnic facilities and fishing.
- Scott Field (Jefferson Avenue) was the result of another land donation of a developer. Originally, in the layout of Scott's Second Addition, 5 acres in the middle of the new housing development was left as a neighborhood play area. The land was donated to the City of La Porte in 1923. It was not until 1952 that the Park Department entered a 99-year lease, for $1 per year, with the school corporation. The park currently includes a shelter, playground, ball diamond, open play, half-court basketball and picnic facilities.
- Soldiers Memorial Park (250 Pine Lake Ave.) was dedicated in 1928 and contains 556 acres. It is the largest city park and known for its trees, water sports and organized recreational activities. The park encompasses all of Stone Lake, 140 acres of water and all but 628 feet of shoreline. Also the park provides a variety of active and passive recreational activities including swimming, playgrounds, diamond sports (softball, baseball and t-ball), volleyball, mountain biking, cross-country skiing, fishing and boating. The property is approximately 85 percent woodlands and water. Access is available to Stone Lake, Pine Lake, Crane Lake and Craven Pond. Nature trails have been developed through a stand of native trees, allowing environmental education opportunities. Soldiers Memorial Park is also the site of the Park Department Office and maintenance facilities, as well as Cummings Lodge.
- Stone Lake Beach (300 Grangemouth Drive) is a public beach with a volleyball courts, playground, picnic shelter, concession stand, and public restrooms.
- Warsaw Tot Lot (Warsaw Street) is a small playground of less than 1 acre in size. The triangular piece of land was donated to the city in 1946 and was developed in 1980 with funding from a federal grant. The play equipment has been recently updated thanks to a donation from the La Porte Park Foundation. Park also has a basketball half-court.
- Pine Lake Beach (Pine Lake Avenue) is a public beach with picnic tables, a newly built walk-way across the beach, and a picnic shelter with a grill.
- Ski-Beach (Waverly Road) is a public beach with picnic tables and grills. This beach is commonly used by boaters, and has a channel connecting Pine Lake to Stone Lake.

Lakes

- Clear Lake
- Crane Lake
- Fish Trap Lake
- Horseshoe Lake
- Lily Lake
- Lower Lake
- Orr Lake
- Pine Lake
- Stone Lake

Golf

- Beechwood Golf Course
- Briar Leaf Golf Club
- Legacy Hills Golf Club

Public activities

- Fitness Fridays
- Saturdays in the Sun
- Saturday Farmers Market
- TacoFest
- Cruise Night
- LakeFest

== Media ==
=== Print ===
The LaPorte Herald-Argus is the only newspaper directly serving La Porte, but it has been combined with The News Dispatch to form The Herald Dispatch.

=== Broadcast ===
La Porte receives television and radio broadcasts from Chicago and South Bend.

==== Radio ====
WCOE, 96.7 FM, WLOI, 1540 AM and Rock, 106.5 FM

In the 1990s, WCOE was a broadcast home to the area NBA Chicago Bulls.

== Notable people ==
- Dick Alban – former National Football League defensive back and Pro-Bowler
- Abram Andrew – United States representative from Massachusetts
- Chuck Baldwin – Baptist minister and 2008 presidential nominee of the Constitution Party
- Chris Bootcheck – Major League Baseball pitcher for the Los Angeles Angels of Anaheim
- Anne E. Carpenter – American scientist and the co-creator of CellProfiler
- John C. Chapple – Wisconsin legislator and newspaper editor
- Dorothy Christ – All-American Girls Professional Baseball League player
- Art Cross – former race-car driver; first rookie of the year at the Indianapolis 500
- Brian Ebersole – mixed martial arts veteran; UFC welterweight division fighter
- Daniel Edwards – figurative sculptor and artist
- Charlie O. Finley – owner of the Kansas City and Oakland Athletics 1960–80
- Belle Gunness – serial killer active 1884–1908
- John D. Hancock – stage and film director, producer and writer
- Harold Handley – 40th governor of Indiana, 1957–1961
- Hazel Harrison – pianist, known as the premiere black pianist of her time
- Ashley Hinshaw – actress and Abercrombie & Fitch model
- Royal R. Ingersoll – U.S. Navy rear admiral
- Paul Rowland Julian – meteorologist who with Roland A. Madden discovered the atmospheric phenomenon known as the Madden–Julian oscillation
- Peter Kesling – orthodontist known for the development of the tip-edge orthodontic appliance
- Karl Paul Link – biochemist best known for his discovery of the anticoagulant warfarin
- William Worrall Mayo – founder of the Mayo Clinic
- Henrietta Meeteer – Latin and Greek professor and dean at Swarthmore College
- Alvera Mickelsen – writer and advocate of Christian feminism
- Douglas J. Moo – New Testament scholar
- Patrick Neary – Roman Catholic priest and bishop
- Isamu Noguchi – Japanese-American artist and landscape architect
- Tom Nowatzke – former National Football League running back
- Tony Raines – NASCAR driver
- Ron Reed – Major League Baseball pitcher, an All-Star and World Series champion; also played in the NBA for the Detroit Pistons
- John G. Roberts – chief justice of the United States
- William Scholl – founder of Dr. Scholl's
- Scott Skiles – National Basketball Association head coach for Milwaukee Bucks, Phoenix Suns, Chicago Bulls and Orlando Magic
- Emerson Spartz – founder of MuggleNet, a Harry Potter fan website, and GivesMeHope
- Wilbur F. Storey – newspaper publisher, Detroit Free Press and Chicago Times
- Almon Brown Strowger – inventor of an electromechanical telephone exchange that became the Strowger switch
- Miles Taylor – senior Trump administration official known as "Anonymous" who wrote an op-ed and book highly critical of Trump
- Julius Travis – justice of the Indiana Supreme Court
- Dorothy Tristan – actress and screenwriter
- David Willis – web cartoonist known for It's Walky!, Shortpacked!, and Dumbing of Age
