= Barker House =

Barker House may refer to:

- Barker House (Vance County, North Carolina), listed on the NRHP in North Carolina

in the United States

(by state then city)

- Woodleaf, Yuba County, California, an unincorporated community also known as Barker House
- Barker House (Manitou Springs, Colorado), listed on the National Register of Historic Places (NRHP)
- John Barker House, Wallingford, Connecticut, listed on the NRHP in Connecticut
- Barker House (Michigan City, Indiana), listed on the NRHP
- John H. Barker Mansion, Michigan City, Indiana, listed on the NRHP
- Stephen Barker House, Methuen, Massachusetts, listed on the NRHP
- George A. Barker House, Quincy, Massachusetts, listed on the NRHP
- Henry F. Barker House, Quincy, Massachusetts, listed on the NRHP
- Richard Barker Octagon House, Worcester, Massachusetts, listed on the NRHP
- Barker House (Edenton, North Carolina), listed on the NRHP
- Judge Joseph Barker, Jr., House, Newport, Ohio, listed on the NRHP
- William Barker Residence, Ghent, Ohio, listed on the NRHP in Ohio
- Col. Joseph Barker House, Marietta, Ohio, listed on the NRHP in Ohio
- Benjamin Barker House, Tiverton, Rhode Island, listed on the NRHP
- Barker House (Houston, Texas), listed on the NRHP in Texas
