= Washington Park Zoo (disambiguation) =

Washington Park Zoo is a zoo in Michigan City, Indiana.

Washington Park Zoo is also the former name of:

- Oregon Zoo, in Portland, Oregon
- Milwaukee County Zoo, in Milwaukee, Wisconsin
