= Elston Grove Historic District =

Elston Grove Historic District can refer to either of two historic districts in the U.S. state of Indiana:

- Elston Grove Historic District (Crawfordsville, Indiana)
- Elston Grove Historic District (Michigan City, Indiana)
