= Ora Hanson Snyder =

American businesswoman

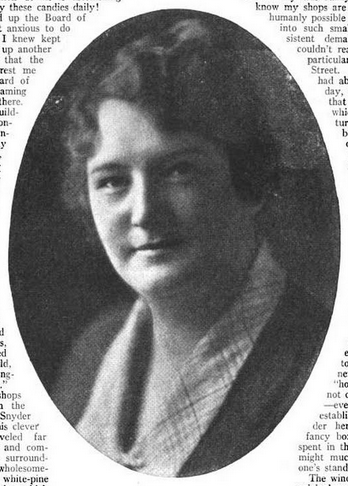
- Ora Hanson Snyder, from a 1919 publication
- Born: Aurora Henrietta Hanson; March 12, 1876; Michigan City, Indiana, U.S.
- Died: July 18, 1948 (age 72); Chicago, Illinois, U.S.
- Occupation: Businesswoman
- Known for: President, Associated Retail Confectioners of the United States (1931)

Ora Hanson Snyder (March 12, 1876 – July 18, 1948) was an American businesswoman, founder of Mrs. Snyder's Candy Company. In 1930 she became the first woman to be elected president of the Associated Retail Confectioners of the United States.

== Early life ==
Aurora Hanson was born in Michigan City, Indiana, the daughter of Olaf Hanson and Mary Hepke Hanson. Her father was a Swedish-born sea captain, and her German-born mother died in 1879, leaving nine children. "He didn't care how much candy we ate, just so long as it was home-made. I was the official candy-maker for the family, and learned to make various confections as I grew older," she later recalled.

== Career ==
Snyder founded Mrs. Snyder's Candy Company in 1909 in her home kitchen in Maywood, Illinois, when her husband was ill and unable to work. She was a founder and, from 1930 to 1932, president of the Associated Retail Confectioners of the United States. She was also an active member of the Chicago Business and Professional Woman's Club. She spoke before the Women's Bureau of the Illinois Manufacturers' Association in 1927, saying "Business life cannot hurt any girl. It opens the path for a better wife, mother, and manager of the home generally."

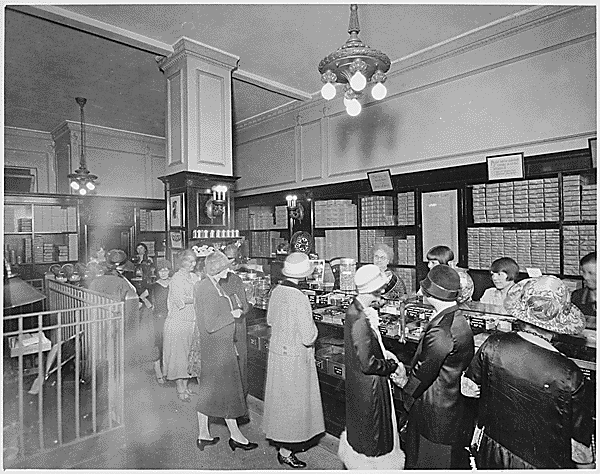
Women shoppers at Mrs. Snyder's Candy Shop, South Michigan Avenue, Chicago - NARA - 522873

Snyder's shops were often located in business districts, because she believed businessmen would buy more candy. Following this approach, her candies were sold in basic packaging, without the sentimental art or pastel frills associated with other confectioners. She air conditioned her stores to make them pleasant to visit, and to keep her chocolates and other candies from melting. She promoted her candy with free samples for train passengers and theatergoers, and publishing recipes and kitchen tips in local newspapers. "Mrs. Snyder is the candy woman of Chicago," explained a newspaper columnist in 1920. "Everybody in the city knows Mrs. Snyder's pure, delicious candies, but what is more, almost everybody knows Mrs. Snyder herself."

At the time of her death in 1948, the Mrs. Snyder's Candy Company had sixteen retail locations and a factory in the Chicago area. Her widower headed the company until his death in 1955. The brand was bought by Fannie May in 1967.

== Personal life and legacy ==
Hanson married William Allen Snyder in 1894; they had a daughter, Edith. Snyder died in 1948, at the age of 72, in Chicago. Snyder's papers, including recipes, photographs, and candy packaging, are in the Newberry Library.
