= Haskell and Barker Historic District =

Historic district in Indiana, United States

- U.S. National Register of Historic Places
- U.S. Historic district
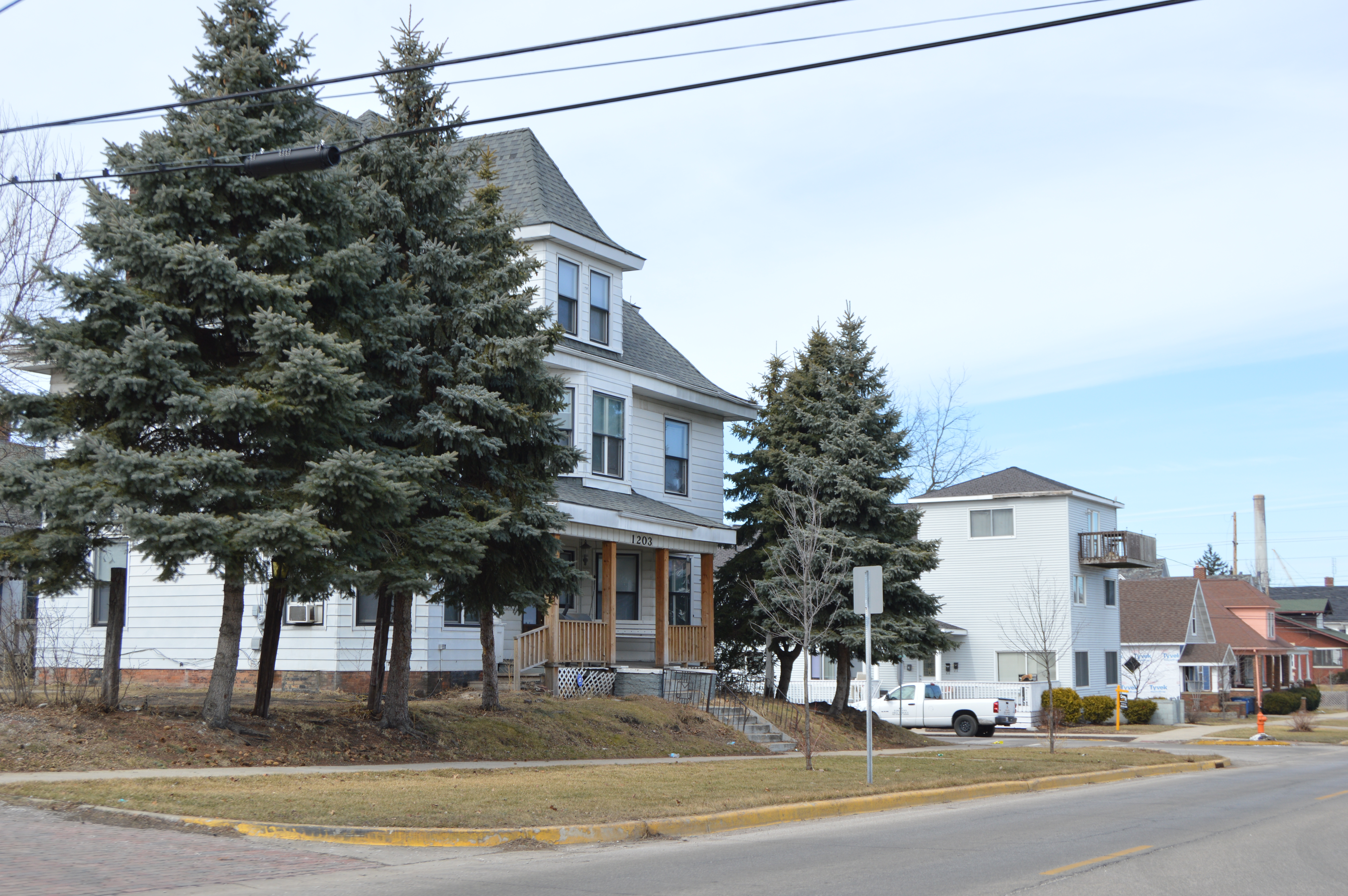
- Washington, west side at Green, March 2015

- Location within Indiana Location within the United States
- Location: Washington and Wabash between 4th and Homer Sts., Michigan City, Indiana
- Coordinates: 41°42′38″N 86°54′04″W
- Area: 51.4 acres (20.8 ha)
- Architectural style: Italianate, Gothic Revival, Queen Anne, Colonial Revival, Tudor Revival, Bungalow/Craftsman
- NRHP reference No.: 14000806
- Added to NRHP: September 30, 2014

Haskell and Barker Historic District is a national historic district located at Michigan City, Indiana. The district encompasses 205 contributing buildings, three contributing structures, and one contributing object in a predominantly residential section of Michigan City. The district is named for the Haskell and Barker manufacturing company. It developed between about 1860 and 1960, and includes examples of Italianate, Gothic Revival, Queen Anne, Colonial Revival, Tudor Revival, and Bungalow / American Craftsman style architecture. Located in the district are the separately listed John H. Barker Mansion and First Congregational Church of Michigan City. Other notable buildings include the St. Stanislaus Koska Church (1922–1926), Rectory (1938), and Convent (1938), Consumer Service Company (1922), Michigan City School of Fine Arts (1908), Gilmore-Gardner Building (1925), Porter-Carrigan House (1895), Hutchinson House (1875), St Mary of the Immaculate Conception Catholic Church (1868) and Convent (1905), and Hartke House (c. 1860).

It was listed in the National Register of Historic Places in 2014.
