= Michigan City, Indiana =

- City
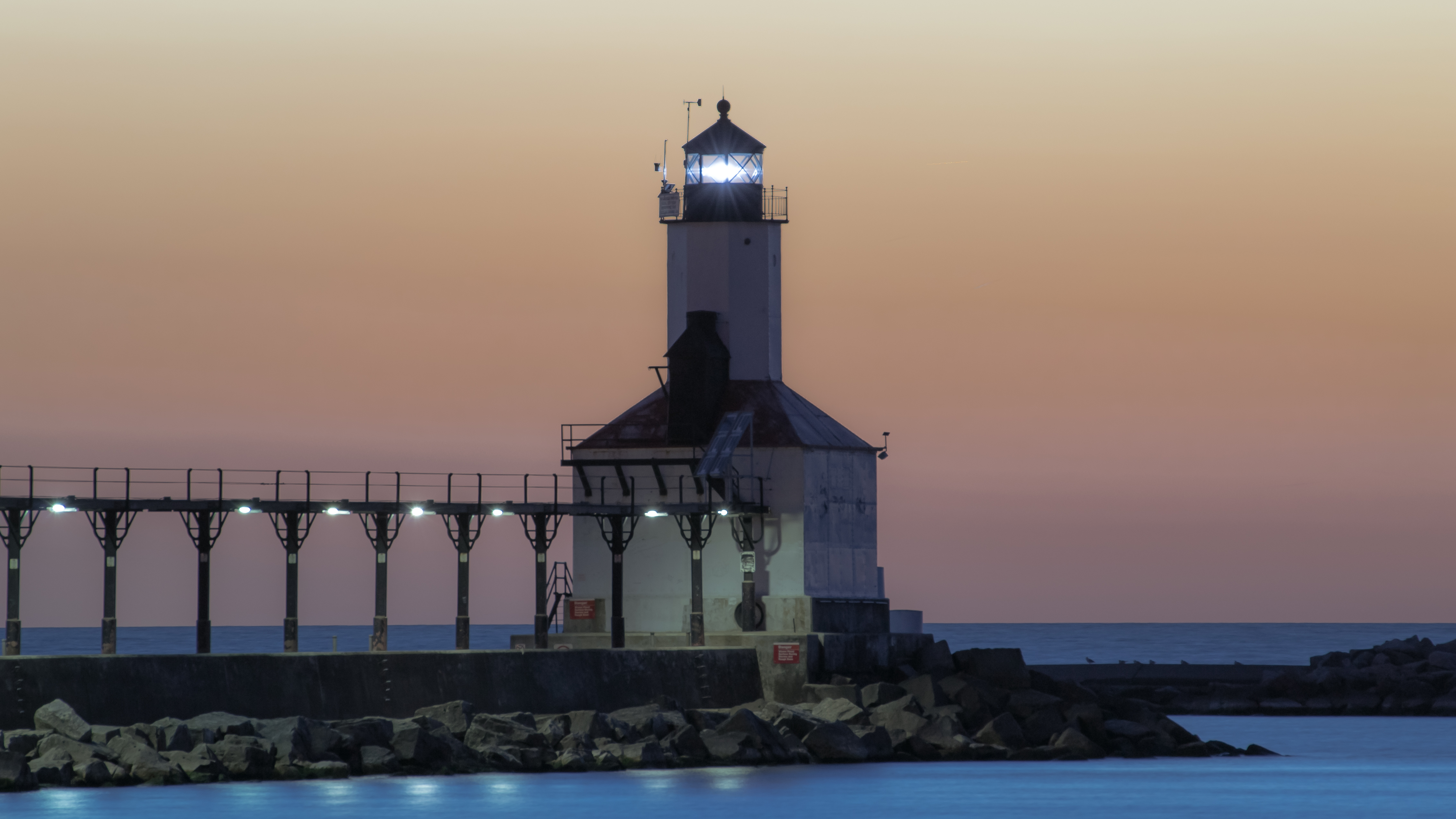
- Michigan City East Light

- Flag Seal
- Interactive map of Michigan City, Indiana
- Location within Indiana Location within the United States
- Coordinates: 41°44′04″N 86°52′23″W
- Country: United States
- State: Indiana
- County: LaPorte
- Townships: Michigan, Coolspring
- Settled: 1830
- Incorporated: 1836
- Founder: Isaac C. Elston

Government
  - Mayor: Angie Nelson Deuitch (D)

Area
  - Total: 20.59 sq mi (53.33 km^{2})
  - Land: 20.41 sq mi (52.85 km^{2})
  - Water: 0.19 sq mi (0.48 km^{2})
- Elevation: 633 ft (193 m)

Population (2020)
  - Total: 32,075
  - Density: 1,571.8/sq mi (606.87/km^{2})
- Time zone: UTC−6 (CST)
  - Summer (DST): UTC−5 (CDT)
- ZIP codes: 46360-46361
- Area code: 219
- FIPS code: 18-48798
- GNIS feature ID: 2395110
- Website: michigancityin.gov

Michigan City is a city in LaPorte County, Indiana, United States. It had a population of 32,075 at the 2020 census. Located along Lake Michigan in the Michiana region, the city is about 45 miles (72 km) east of Chicago and is 40 miles (64 km) west of South Bend.

Michigan City is noted for both its proximity to Indiana Dunes National Park and for bordering Lake Michigan. It receives a fair amount of tourism during the summer, especially by residents of Chicago and nearby cities in Northern Indiana. It is connected to Chicago via the South Shore Line passenger train.

== History ==
Michigan City's origins date to 1830, when the land for the city was first purchased by Isaac C. Elston, a real estate speculator who had made his fortune in Crawfordsville, Indiana. He paid about $200 total for 160 acres (65 ha) of land. The now-closed Elston Middle School, formerly Elston High School, was named after the founder.

The city was incorporated in 1836, by which point it had 1,500 residents, along with a post office, a newspaper, a church, a commercial district and ten hotels. In these six years the town had grown to a size of 15 square miles (39 km^{2}). That same year, the State Bank of Indiana opened a branch in town.

The adjacent incorporated town of Lakeland was annexed into Michigan City on January 4, 1960. This added about 7 1/2 square miles (19 km^{2}) and 3,000 residents to Michigan City.

Michigan City hosted the sailing competitions of the 1987 Pan American Games on Lake Michigan. Indianapolis, roughly 150 miles (240 km) southeast, was the host city.

== Geography ==
According to the 2010 census, Michigan City has an area of 22.855 square miles (59.19 km^{2}), of which 19.59 square miles (50.74 km^{2}) (or 85.71%) is land and 3.265 square miles (8.46 km^{2}) (or 14.29%) is water.

Michigan City is home to Trail Creek, which flows into Lake Michigan.

=== Climate ===
Michigan City, Indiana

Climate chart (precipitation, max. and min. temperature)
J	F	M	A	M	J	J	A	S	O	N	D
2.7 31 18	2.4 35 21	2.9 46 30	3.6 59 40	4 70 50	4.2 79 60	4.3 82 64	4.3 81 63	3.6 74 55	3.7 62 44	4 48 34	3.2 35 23
- █ Average max. and min. temperatures in °F
- █ Precipitation totals in inches
- Source: The Weather Channel
Metric conversion
J	F	M	A	M	J	J	A	S	O	N	D
68 −1 −8	62 2 −6	75 8 −1	91 15 4	102 21 10	106 26 16	108 28 18	108 27 17	92 23 13	94 17 7	101 9 1	81 2 −5
- █ Average max. and min. temperatures in °C
- █ Precipitation totals in mm

The highest recorded temperature was 104 °F (40 °C) in 1953. The lowest recorded temperature was −23 °F (−31 °C) in 1994.

The city has a usual weather pattern for a temperate region, with four distinct seasons. Summers are often warm and humid with frequent thunderstorms. Winters are cold and snowy. Due to its location next to Lake Michigan the city frequently experiences lake-effect snows and rain showers.

== Demographics ==
Historical population
Census	Pop.	Note	%±
1850	999		—
1860	3,320		232.3%
1870	3,985		20.0%
1880	7,366		84.8%
1890	10,773		46.3%
1900	14,850		37.8%
1910	19,027		28.1%
1920	19,457		2.3%
1930	26,735		37.4%
1940	26,476		−1.0%
1950	28,395		7.2%
1960	36,653		29.1%
1970	39,369		7.4%
1980	36,850		−6.4%
1990	33,822		−8.2%
2000	32,900		−2.7%
2010	31,479		−4.3%
2020	32,075		1.9%
Source: US Census Bureau

=== Racial and ethnic composition ===
Michigan City city, Indiana – Racial and ethnic composition Note: the US Census treats Hispanic/Latino as an ethnic category. This table excludes Latinos from the racial categories and assigns them to a separate category. Hispanics/Latinos may be of any race.
Race / Ethnicity (NH = Non-Hispanic)	Pop 2000	Pop 2010	Pop 2020	% 2000	% 2010	% 2020
White alone (NH)	22,309	19,595	18,410	67.81%	62.25%	57.40%
Black or African American alone (NH)	8,576	8,741	8,787	26.07%	27.77%	27.40%
Native American or Alaska Native alone (NH)	80	97	85	0.24%	0.31%	0.27%
Asian alone (NH)	162	226	285	0.49%	0.72%	0.89%
Native Hawaiian or Pacific Islander alone (NH)	6	3	5	0.02%	0.01%	0.02%
Other race alone (NH)	63	42	167	0.19%	0.13%	0.52%
Mixed race or Multiracial (NH)	669	932	1,866	2.03%	2.96%	5.82%
Hispanic or Latino (any race)	1,035	1,843	2,470	3.15%	5.85%	7.70%
Total	32,900	31,479	32,075	100.00%	100.00%	100.00%

=== 2020 census ===
As of the 2020 census, Michigan City had a population of 32,075. The median age was 39.0 years. 22.2% of residents were under the age of 18 and 16.6% of residents were 65 years of age or older. For every 100 females there were 107.2 males, and for every 100 females age 18 and over there were 108.6 males age 18 and over.

99.7% of residents lived in urban areas, while 0.3% lived in rural areas.

There were 12,795 households in Michigan City, of which 26.8% had children under the age of 18 living in them. Of all households, 29.3% were married-couple households, 24.1% were households with a male householder and no spouse or partner present, and 37.4% were households with a female householder and no spouse or partner present. About 37.6% of all households were made up of individuals and 14.8% had someone living alone who was 65 years of age or older.

There were 15,002 housing units, of which 14.7% were vacant. The homeowner vacancy rate was 2.1% and the rental vacancy rate was 8.0%.

Racial composition as of the 2020 census
Race	Number	Percent
White	18,997	59.2%
Black or African American	8,931	27.8%
American Indian and Alaska Native	141	0.4%
Asian	287	0.9%
Native Hawaiian and Other Pacific Islander	6	0.0%
Some other race	1,089	3.4%
Two or more races	2,624	8.2%

=== 2010 census ===
As of the census of 2010, there were 31,479 people, 12,136 households, and 7,147 families living in the city. The population density was 1,606.9 inhabitants per square mile (620.4/km^{2}). There were 14,435 housing units at an average density of 736.9 per square mile (284.5/km^{2}). The racial makeup of the city was 64.9% White, 28.1% African American, 0.4% Native American, 0.7% Asian, 2.1% from other races, and 3.7% from two or more races. Hispanic or Latino of any race were 5.9% of the population.

There were 12,136 households, of which 30.5% had children under the age of 18 living with them, 33.4% were married couples living together, 19.0% had a female householder with no husband present, 6.5% had a male householder with no wife present, and 41.1% were non-families. 34.3% of all households were made up of individuals, and 12% had someone living alone who was 65 years of age or older. The average household size was 2.37 and the average family size was 3.05.

The median age in the city was 37.1 years. 23.5% of residents were under the age of 18; 8.9% were between the ages of 18 and 24; 27.8% were from 25 to 44; 26.2% were from 45 to 64; and 13.5% were 65 years of age or older. The gender makeup of the city was 51.4% male and 48.6% female.

=== 2000 census ===
As of the census of 2000, there were 32,900 people, 12,550 households, and 7,906 families living in the city. The population density was 1,678.6 inhabitants per square mile (648.1/km^{2}). There were 14,221 housing units at an average density of 725.6 per square mile (280.2/km^{2}). The racial makeup of the city was 69.45% White, 26.31% African American, 0.26% Native American, 0.51% Asian, 0.02% Pacific Islander, 1.10% from other races, and 2.36% from two or more races. Hispanic or Latino of any race were 3.15% of the population.

There were 12,550 households, out of which 30.6% had children under the age of 18 living with them, 40.0% were married couples living together, 18.1% had a female householder with no husband present, and 37.0% were non-families. 30.9% of all households were made up of individuals, and 11.6% had someone living alone who was 65 years of age or older. The average household size was 2.41 and the average family size was 3.02.

In the city, the population was spread out, with 25.0% under the age of 18, 9.6% from 18 to 24, 30.8% from 25 to 44, 20.6% from 45 to 64, and 14.1% who were 65 years of age or older. The median age was 35 years. For every 100 females, there were 101.8 males. For every 100 females age 18 and over, there were 100.9 males.

The median income for a household in the city was $33,732, and the median income for a family was $39,520. Males had a median income of $32,194 versus $23,125 for females. The per capita income for the city was $16,995. About 10.4% of families and 13.3% of the population were below the poverty line, including 20.2% of those under age 18 and 9.5% of those age 65 or over.

== Arts and culture ==
=== Points of interest ===
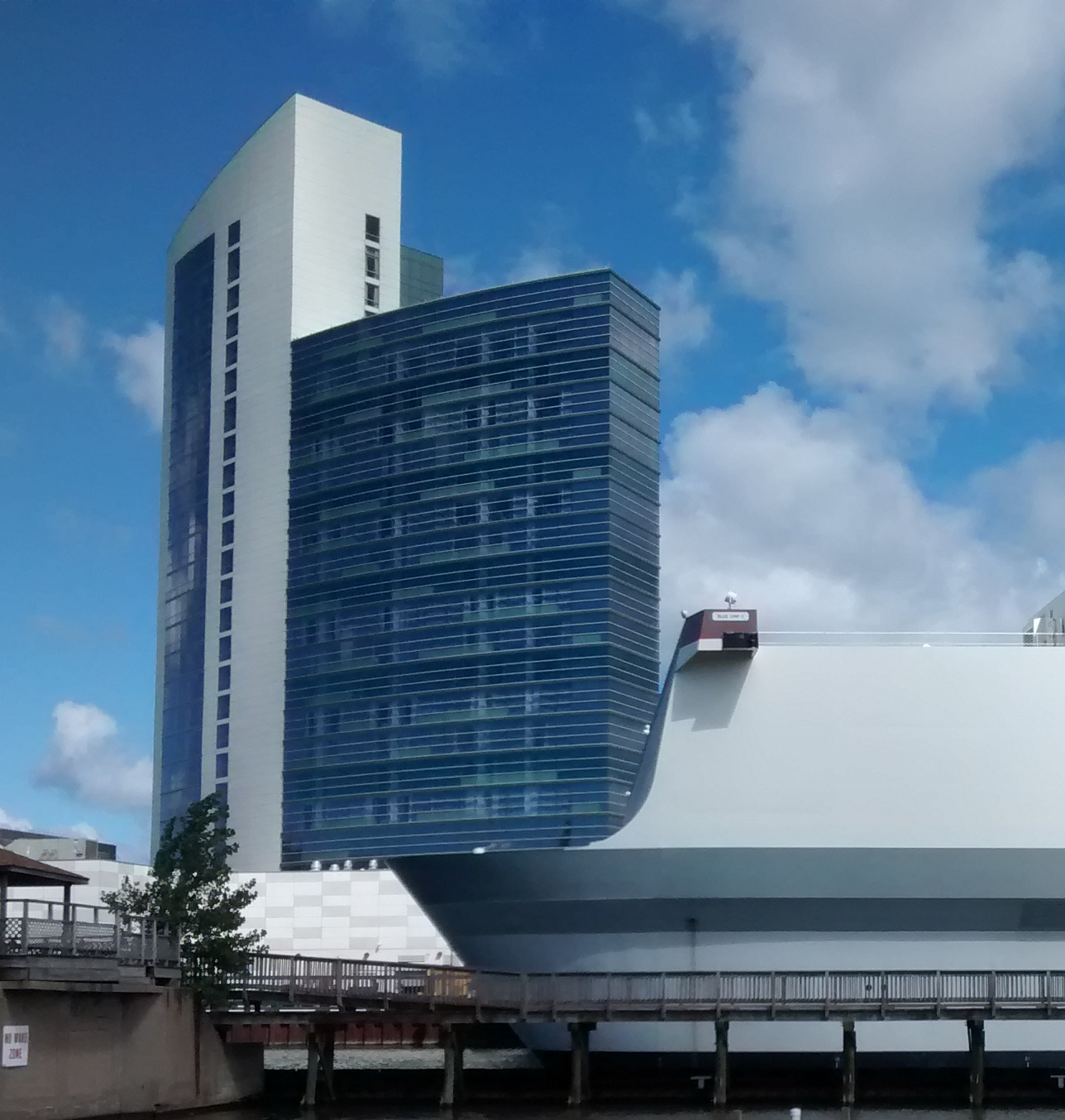
Blue Chip is Indiana's largest riverboat casino.

Michigan City is the home of the Old Michigan City Light; and the newer currently functioning one which is Indiana's only lighthouse.

The Pullman-Standard rail car plant was located in Michigan City.

Lighthouse Place Premium Outlets mall, opened in 1987 on the city's north end, is an outdoor mall.

Marquette Mall was Michigan City's sole indoor shopping mall. Opened in 1967, it was anchored by Sears, Carson's and JCPenney. The interior of the mall closed in 2017 after JCPenney shuttered, while the property and attached office tower later remained the subject of redevelopment efforts.

Franciscan Health Michigan City is Michigan City's main hospital, located just off of the 94 highway.

Michigan City also houses a zoo, and art center, and also is the home of the Indiana State Prison.

Michigan City also has one of the nation's oldest active municipal bands. Free concerts are performed for the public every Thursday evening at the Guy F. Foreman Amphitheatre located in Washington Park.

The eastern edge of Indiana Dunes National Park is also located in Michigan City. Features include Mount Baldy, a large wandering dune. A larger dune, Hoosier Slide, sat at the site of the current electrical generating station. This dune was mined for its sand in the late 19th century. The sand found on the beaches in and near Michigan City is nicknamed "singing sand" because of the sound it produces.

Michigan City Power Plant lies along the shore of Lake Michigan west of the downtown core. The cooling tower of the coal burning plant is visible for miles around and is often mistaken for a nuclear power plant.

Michigan City is home to the largest riverboat casino in Indiana, the Blue Chip Casino. In 2009, the Blue Chip complex added a 22-story hotel, which is the biggest building in northwest Indiana. Michigan City has also added a new skatepark at Pullman Field to its tourism offerings.

In the 2000s and 2010s, Michigan City has been working on revitalizing much of its north end, which contains the oldest portions of the city. One plan that has been discussed is the Andrews Plan, which won the 2008 CNU Charter Award of Excellence. Most of the discussion centers on maintaining and expanding open and accessible park areas on Lake Michigan and along Trail Creek.

The Barker House, John H. Barker Mansion, Elston Grove Historic District, First Congregational Church of Michigan City, Franklin Street Commercial Historic District, Garrettson-Baine-Bartholomew House, Haskell and Barker Historic District, Michigan City East Pierhead Light Tower and Elevated Walk, Old Michigan City Light, Michigan City Post Office, SS Muskegan Shipwreck Site, and Washington Park are listed in the National Register of Historic Places.

== Government ==
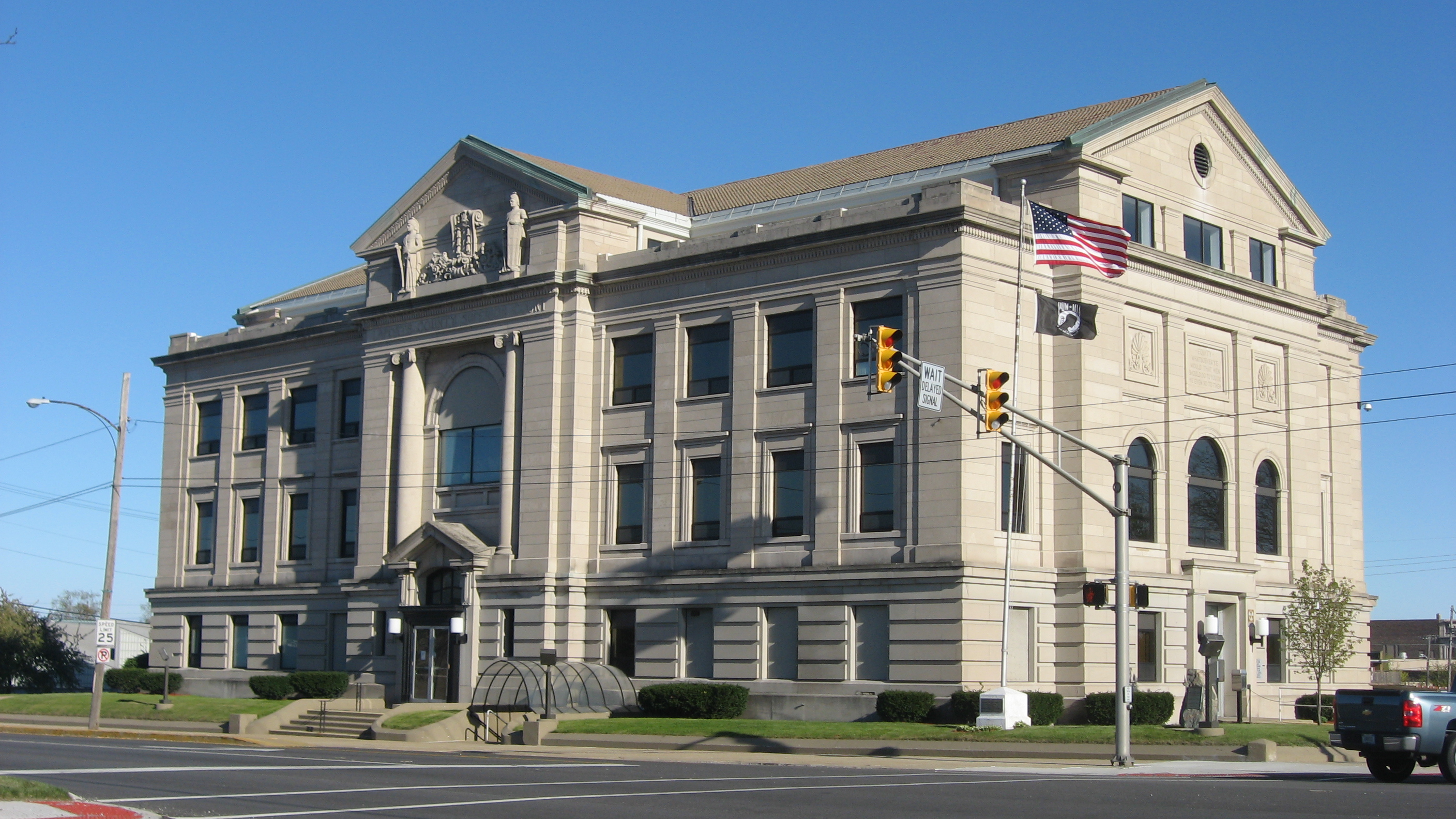
Michigan City Courthouse

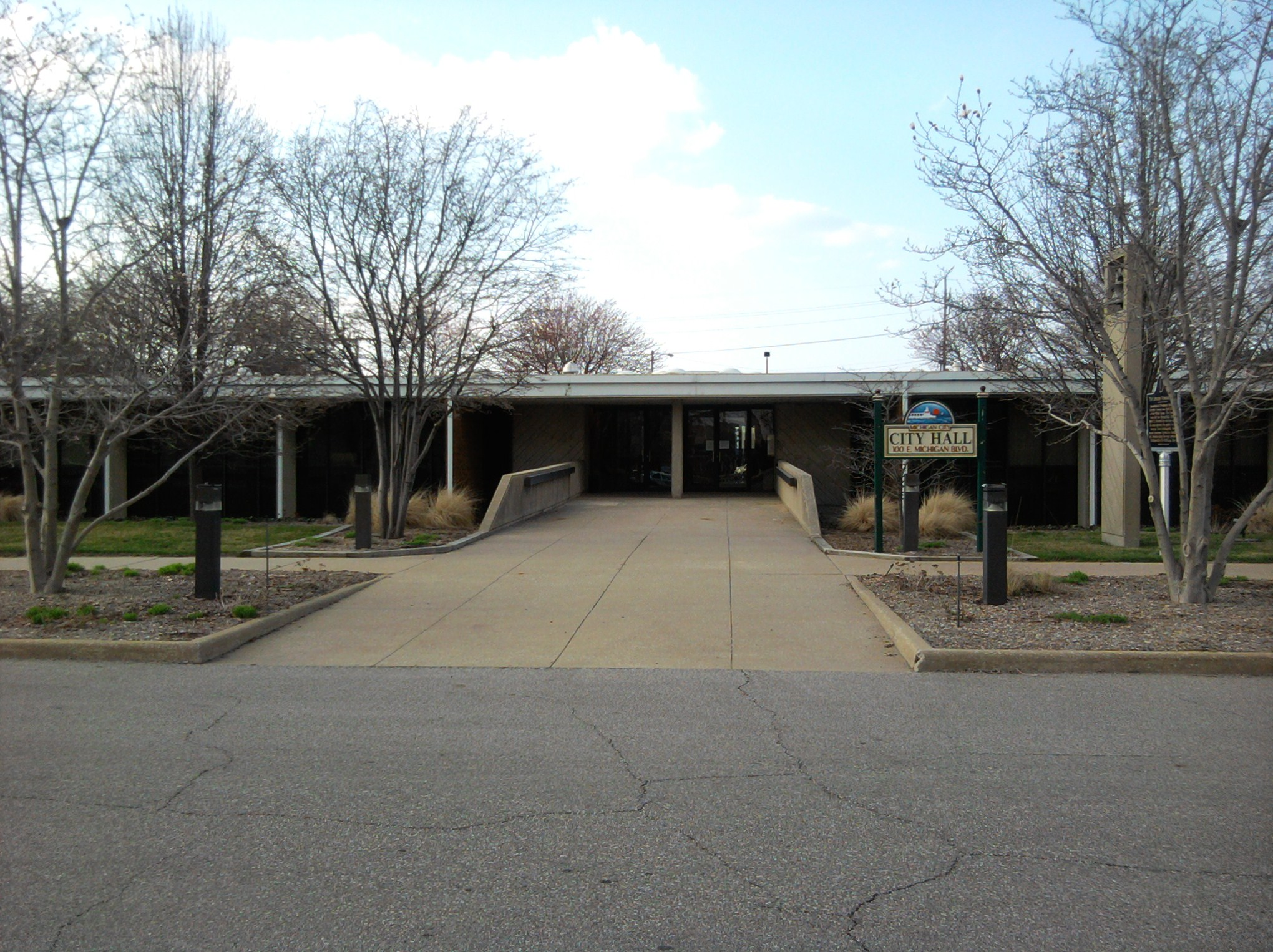
Michigan City City Hall

Michigan City is administered under a mayor-council government. The city council is the legislative body and consists of nine members. Six members are elected from six wards, and three are elected at-large.

== Education ==
Michigan City Area Schools, the school district covering all of the city limits, includes one high school (Michigan City High School), two middle schools, and eight elementary schools.

At one time Michigan City had two public high schools: M.C. Elston High School (Red Devils) (Elston was the name of one of the middle schools located in the city and was located at the former Elston High School), and M.C. Rogers High School (Raiders). The two schools combined after the 1994–1995 school year – the first graduating class was the Class of 1996 – and now constitute the present day Michigan City High School (Wolves). The school is located at the former Rogers High School site. Elston Middle School, along with elementary school Niemann, closed at the end of the 2013/2014 school year.

Michigan City previously also had three parochial high schools – Marquette, La Lumiere, and Duneland Lutheran but, due to a lack of funds, Duneland Lutheran closed down at the end of the 2008/2009 school year. There are several parochial elementary schools in the city, including St. Stanislaus Kostka School, Queen of All Saints School, and Notre Dame Catholic School. St. Paul Lutheran School closed down in the 2022–2023 school year.

Michigan City has a lending library, the Michigan City Public Library. In addition, the La Porte County Public Library operates the Coolspring branch library just outside Michigan City city limits.

== Media ==
The La Porte County Herald-Dispatch is Michigan City's only subscription newspaper, covering the city and the surrounding municipalities in LaPorte and Porter counties. The Beacher is a Michigan City-based weekly newspaper that covers the city and its vicinity. Chicago Tribune, Chicago Sun-Times and South Bend Tribune are distributed throughout Michigan City. Off the Water, a free weekly art and entertainment newspaper published by Niles, Michigan-based Leader Publications, primarily focuses on the Niles-Benton Harbor metropolitan area, but it is distributed in downtown Michigan City.

Michigan City is in Chicago's Area of Dominant Influence. Radio and television broadcasts from both Chicago and South Bend reach most of the population. Michigan City also has one FM radio station, WEFM FM 95.9 and one AM radio station, WIMS AM 1420. (Which is also heard on FM translator W236BD 95.1 FM). The city has one Government-access television (GATV) station, Access LaPorte County, as well as one channel operated by the local school system (MCAS).

== Transportation ==
=== Rail ===
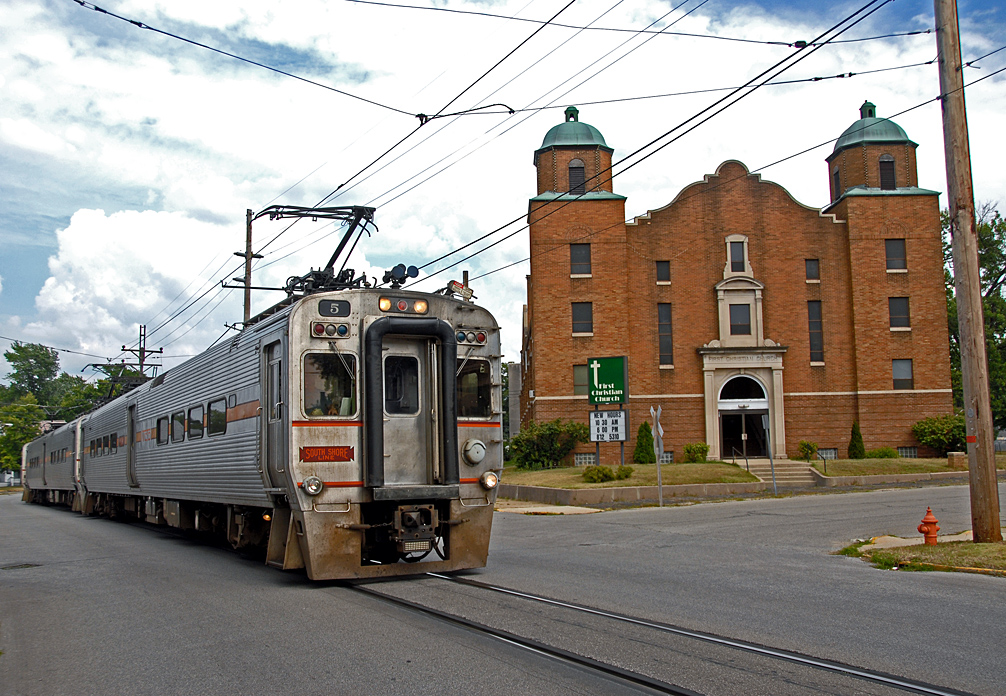
A South Shore train passes Cedar Street at 11th. The street running was removed between 2021 and 2023.

Michigan City is a major stop along the South Shore Line, one of the last interurban rail lines in the U.S. Until 2021, the train ran directly through on 11th Street (it had no separate right-of-way, and shared the street with automobiles and other road traffic), making two stops in Michigan City's downtown area (11th Street and Carroll Avenue). A third stop, at Willard Avenue and 10th Street, closed in 1994. This rail line connects Michigan City with downtown Chicago westward as well as the South Bend Regional Airport to the east.

Prior to April 4, 2022, Amtrak served the city with Wolverine trains, which ran from Chicago to Detroit, and Pontiac three times a day in each direction, filling in several gaps in South Shore Line's weekday service and augmenting weekend service. While Wolverine trains were faster than South Shore Line trains, the South Shore Line was cheaper and ran more frequently. Currently, Amtrak trains pass through Michigan City without stopping and the nearest Amtrak station is New Buffalo, Michigan, about ten miles away.

=== Bus ===
Michigan City operates a bus service. Officially known as Michigan City Transit, it is made up of four routes that run on Monday-Saturday. All routes originate at Michigan City Public Library and travel around the city in (largely mono-directional) loops until they return to the library. Route 3 connects to Carroll Avenue South Shore Line station, while other routes connect to the 11th street station. In addition, Route 1 passes near the Amtrak station on the way to Washington Park. Michigan City also operates a Dial-a-Bus service.

Public transportation in Michigan City has been free since December 2025.

Coach USA's Indiana Airport SuperSaver service between The University of Notre Dame and O'Hare airport stopped at Michigan City at the La Porte County Convention and Visitors Bureau at Marquette Mall (4073 S. Franklin St). The service made stops at Notre Dame, South Bend, Portage, Highland, Crestwood and O'Hare and Midway airports. Buses ran from 4:10 am – 1:10 am (US Central Time). Buses ran once every hour in both direction between Michigan City and O'Hare and Midway and once every two hours between Michigan City and Notre Dame. On December 10, 2019, Coach USA announced it will cease operations of its Indiana Airport SuperSaver service effective January 1, 2020.

=== Air ===
Michigan City Municipal Airport has a 4,100 foot asphalt runway and averages 118 operations per week. Options for commercial air service include the South Bend International Airport in South Bend. The South Shore Line terminates at the South Bend airport, while there is a train stop serving the Gary airport.

== Notable people ==
- Jean Baptiste Point du Sable is regarded as the first permanent resident of Chicago, Illinois. In 1779, he was living on the site of present-day Michigan City, Indiana, when he was arrested by the British military on suspicion of being an American sympathizer in the American Revolutionary War.
- Daniel D. Bruce, United States Marine who was posthumously awarded the Medal of Honor for heroism in Vietnam in March 1969
- Howard G. "Ward" Cunningham, author, software developer and inventor of the word and concept of the "wiki"
- William C. Eddy, Captain Eddy was a career Naval officer and engineer, educator, inventor, entrepreneur, explorer and writer.
- Marilla Waite Freeman was the first Librarian of the Michigan City Public Library upon its opening in 1897.
- Jarrod Jones (born 1990), American-Hungarian basketball player in the Israeli Basketball Premier League
- Ora Hanson Snyder (1876–1948), Chicago businesswoman
- Allan Spear, eminent U.S. historian and political progressive, author, Black Chicago: The Making of a Negro Ghetto; president Minnesota State Senate, early advocate for gay people

=== Actors ===
- Charles Arnt, actor
- Anne Baxter, Academy Award-winning actress
- Rati Gupta, dancer and actress known for her recurring role as Anu, the fiancée of Raj Koothrappali in the CBS sitcom The Big Bang Theory.

=== Journalist/Writers ===
- Alvera Mickelsen, writer, journalism professor, advocate of Christian feminism, and co-founder of Christians for Biblical Equality (CBE)
- Achy Obejas, writer and journalist
- Amy Spindler, fashion critic and style editor of The New York Times Magazine

=== Politicians ===
- Naomi Anderson, a black suffragist
- Richard G. Hatcher, mayor of Gary, Indiana
- John Huppenthal, Republican State senator in the Arizona State Legislature
- David E. Lilienthal, Chairman of the Tennessee Valley Authority 1941–1946; Chairman, U.S. Atomic Energy Commission, 1947–1949
- Zeola Hershey Misener, suffragist and one of the first women elected to the Indiana General Assembly
- Scott Pelath, former Indiana House of Representatives member
- John L. Sieb, member of the Wisconsin State Assembly, barber

=== Sports ===
- Braden Fiske, Los Angeles Rams football player
- Abe Gibron, Chicago Bears football player and head coach
- Harry Hebner, Olympic swimmer and water polo player
- Anita King, racecar driver, actress, and thoroughbred racehorse owner
- Mike LaRocco, professional Supercross and Motocross racer
- Don Larsen, Major League Baseball pitcher
- John Parry, former National Football League official
- Donnie Thomas, former linebacker for the New England Patriots
- Jeff Peterek, Major League Baseball Pitcher

=== Artists ===
- Charles Freeman Lee, jazz trumpeter in the 1950s and 1960s, taught Science at Krueger School in Michigan City after retiring from music
- Rosemary Sebert, singer and songwriter born in Michigan City, mother of singer and songwriter Kesha
- Jorjiana, rapper and songwriter
