= George A. Barker House =

Historic house in Massachusetts, United States

- U.S. National Register of Historic Places
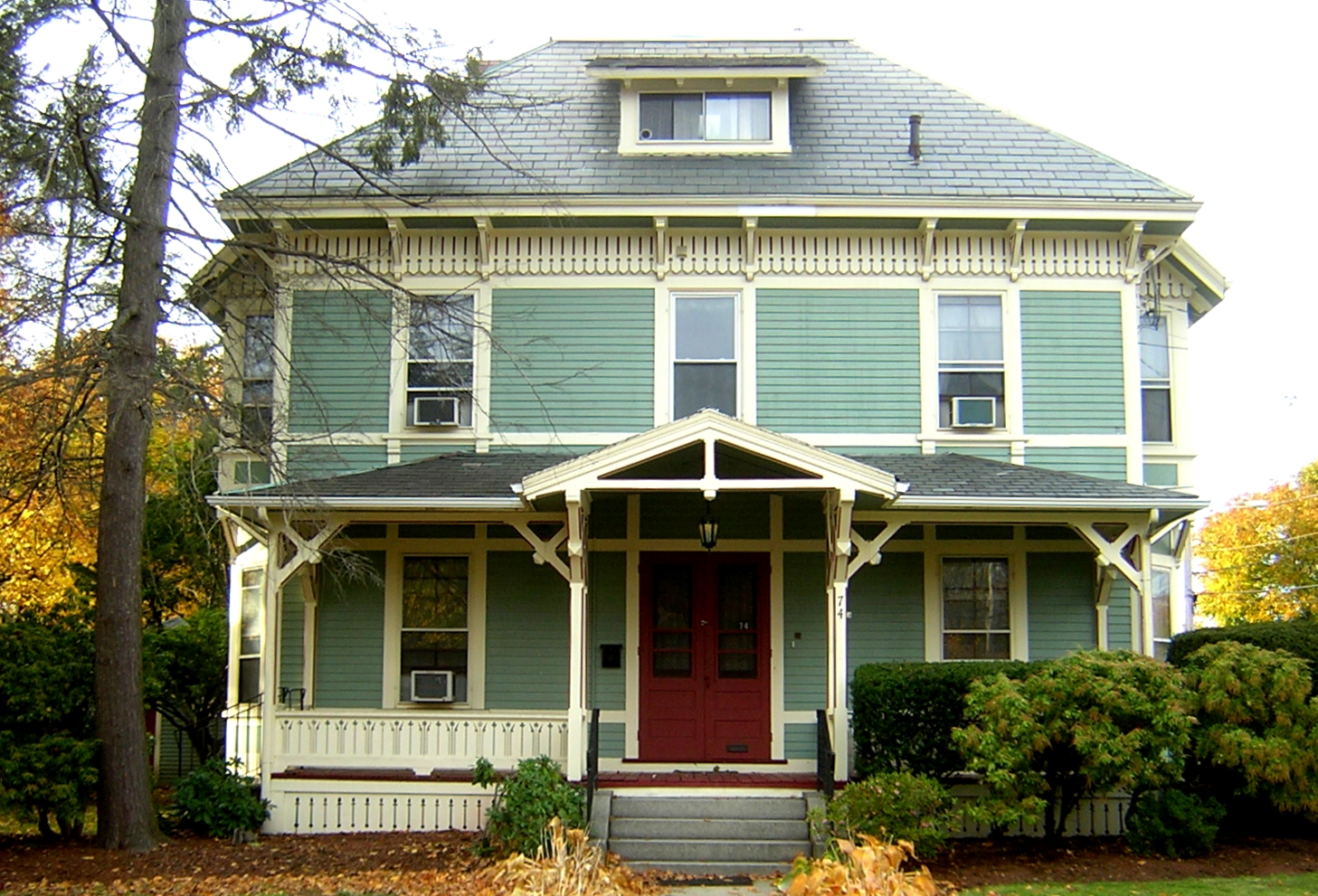

- Location within Massachusetts Location within the United States
- Location: 74 Greenleaf St., Quincy, Massachusetts
- Coordinates: 42°15′25.5″N 71°0′14.5″W
- Built: 1875
- Architectural style: Stick-Eastlake
- MPS: Quincy MRA
- NRHP reference No.: 89001345
- Added to NRHP: September 20, 1989

The George A. Barker House is a historic house located at 74 Greenleaf Street in Quincy, Massachusetts. Built in the late 1870s for the son of a local granite quarry owner, it is a good local example of Queen Anne architecture with Stick style details. The house was listed on the National Register of Historic Places on September 20, 1989.

== Description and history ==
The George A. Barker House is located in a residential area north of downtown Quincy, at the northwest corner of Greenleaf and Putnam Streets. It is set on a 0.5-acre (0.20 ha) lot with a low granite retaining wall on the two street-facing sides. The house is a 2 1/2-story wood-frame structure, with a truncated hip roof, and an exterior finished in wooden clapboards. It has applied woodwork detailing typical of the style, as well as asymmetrical massing and angled bracketing on the front porch. The main roof eave is adorned with brackets and a band of jigsawn picket fence woodwork. The main facade is three bays wide, with the entrance at the center, were a gable is set above the porch stairs. An early 20th-century garage is located at the back of the property.

The house was built in the late 1870s for George Barker, the son of Henry Barker, owner of some of the largest of Quincy's granite quarries, whose own house also stands on Greenleaf Street. It is one of two Stick Style houses on Greenleaf Street, and one of two well-preserved examples of the style in the city.

== See also ==
- National Register of Historic Places listings in Quincy, Massachusetts
