= First Congregational Church of Michigan City =

Historic church in Indiana, United States

- U.S. National Register of Historic Places
- U.S. Historic district – Contributing property
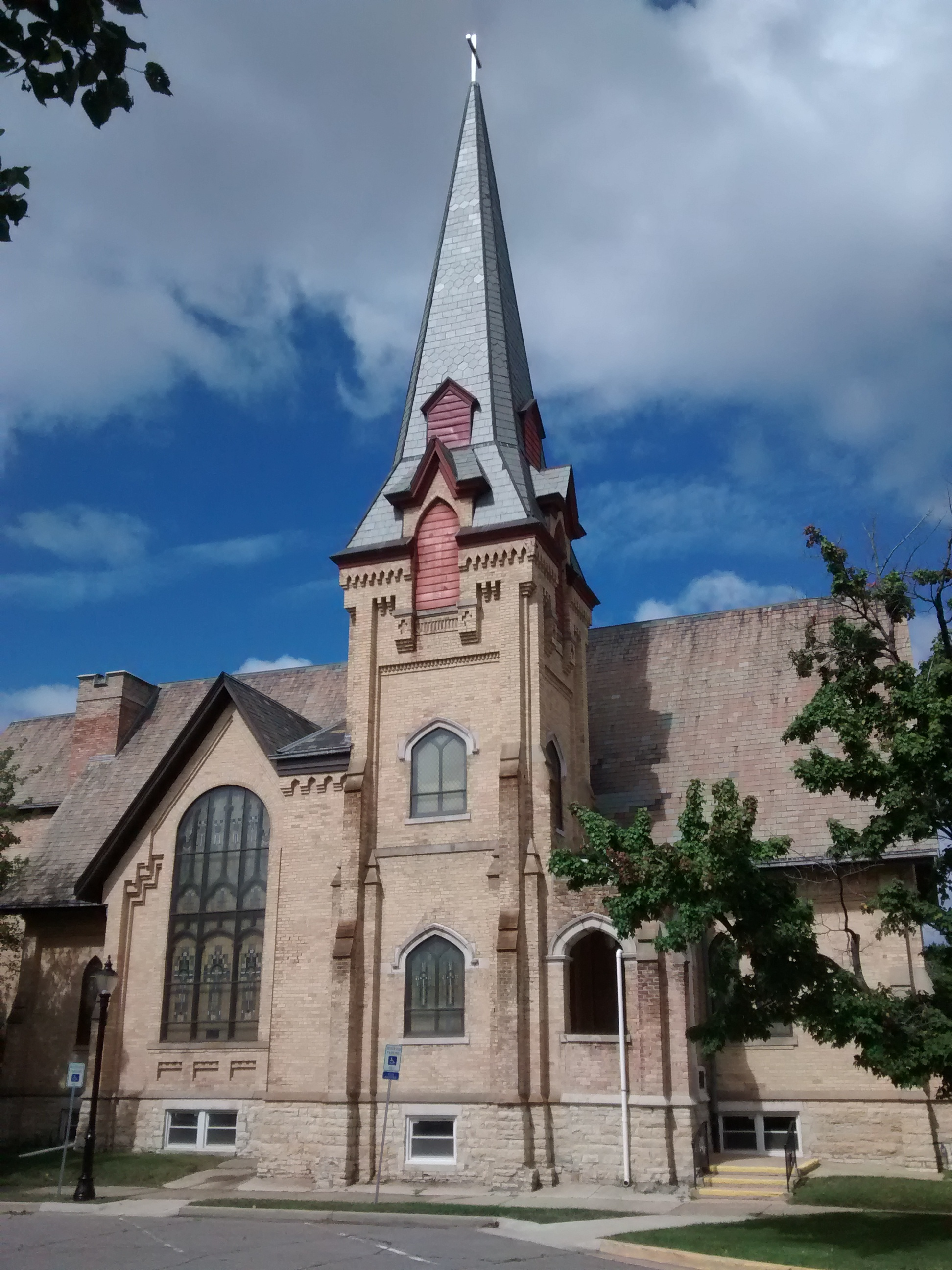

- Location within Indiana Location within the United States
- Location: 531 Washington St., Michigan City, Indiana
- Coordinates: 41°42′57″N 86°54′12″W
- Area: less than one acre
- Built: 1880-1881, 1908-1909
- Architect: Watkins & Hidden; et al.
- Architectural style: Romanesque, Tudor Revival
- NRHP reference No.: 01001343
- Added to NRHP: December 7, 2001

First Congregational Church of Michigan City is a historic Congregational church building at 531 Washington Street in Michigan City, Indiana. The church building was built in 1880-1881 and constructed in a Romanesque, Tudor Revival style. It was rebuilt in 1908-1909 following a fire. It is the second oldest church building in Michigan City.

It was listed on the National Register of Historic Places in 2001. It is located in the Haskell and Barker Historic District.
