= Old Michigan City Light =

Lighthouse in Indiana, United States

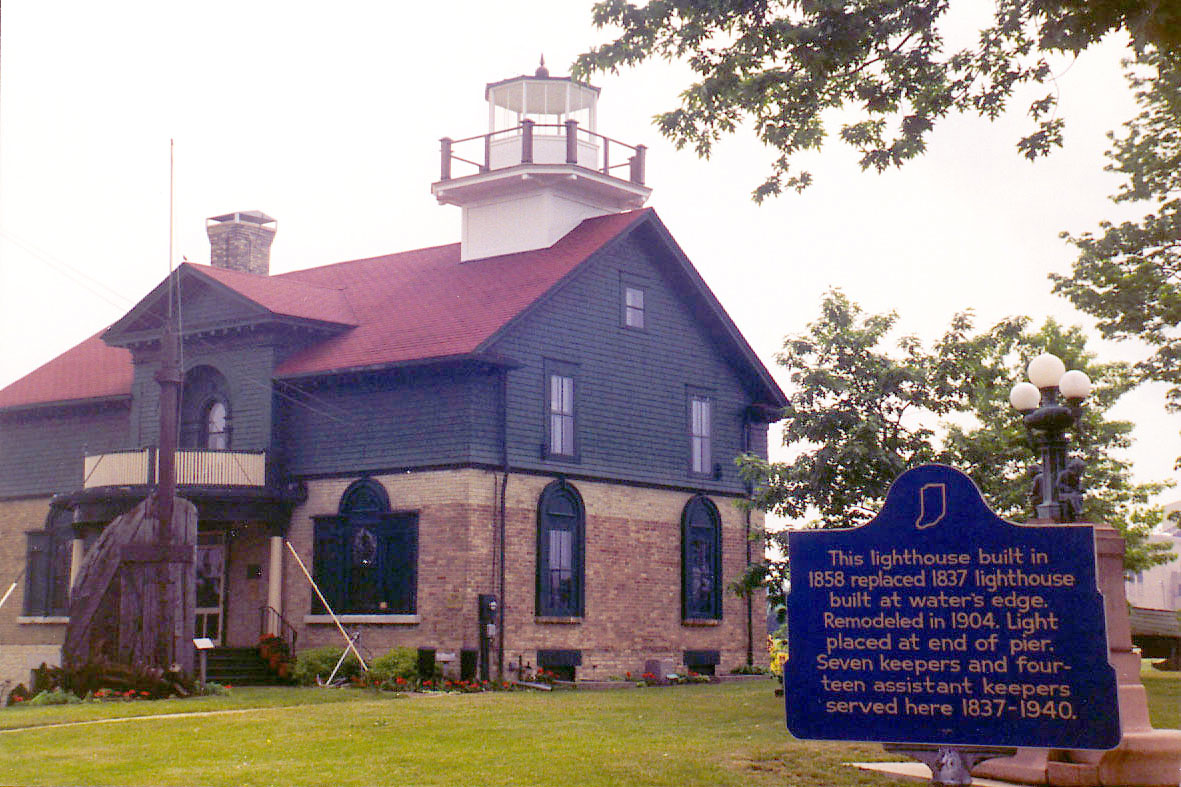
- Location: Washington Park, Michigan City, Indiana
- Coordinates: 41°43′22″N 86°54′21″W

Tower
- Height: 40 ft (12 m)
- Heritage: National Register of Historic Places listed place

Light
- First lit: 1858
- Deactivated: 1904
- Focal height: 60 feet (18 m)
- Lens: Fifth Order Fresnel
- Michigan City Lighthouse
- U.S. National Register of Historic Places
- Area: 1 acre (0.40 ha)
- NRHP reference No.: 74000023
- Added to NRHP: November 5, 1974

The Old Michigan City Light is a decommissioned lighthouse located in the harbor of Michigan City, Indiana.

Built in 1858 at a cost of $8,000, this lighthouse, replaced an 1837 brick & stone light built at the edge of Lake Michigan. It was the second light at the site, and the predecessor to the Michigan City East Light, to which the lantern, lens and light were moved in 1904; it being the new light at the end of the newly extended pier.

It was remodeled in 1904. Seven Lighthouse keepers and fourteen assistant keepers served here from 1837 to 1940.

A fourth order Fresnel lens is on display.

It is one of a dozen past or present lighthouses in Indiana.

== Location ==
The lighthouse is located in Washington Park. It is open every day except Mondays from 1 to 4 p.m., except in winter.

== See also ==
- Lighthouses in the United States
- National Historic Lighthouse Preservation Act
