= Washington Park (Michigan City, Indiana) =

Historic district in Indiana, United States

- U.S. National Register of Historic Places
- U.S. Historic district
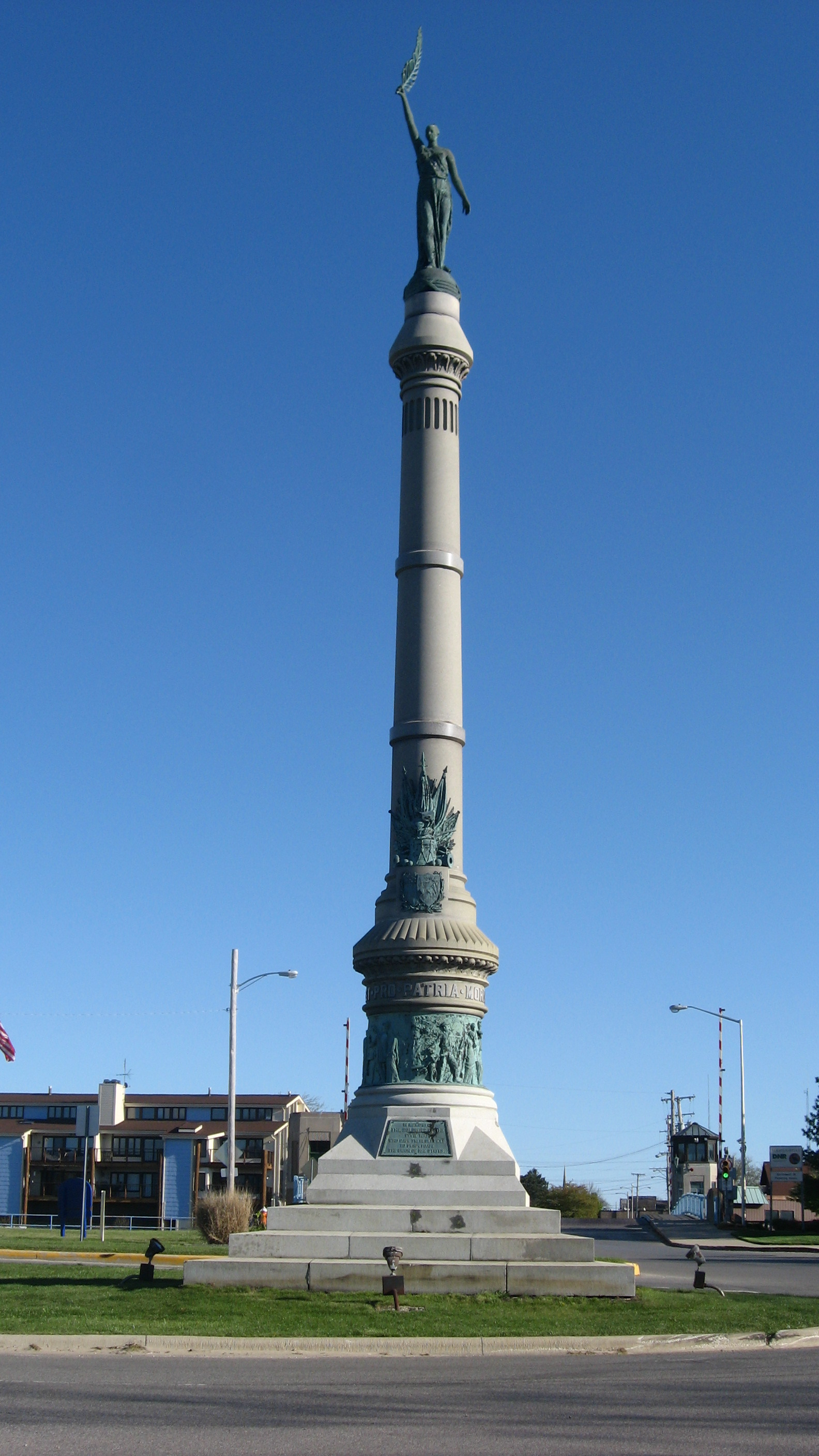
- Soldiers' and Sailors' Monument, April 2012

- Location within Indiana Location within the United States
- Location: Roughly bounded by Lake Michigan, Krueger St., Trail Cr., Lakeshore Dr., Heisman Harbor Rd. and Browne Basin Rd., Michigan City, Indiana
- Coordinates: 41°43′34″N 86°54′03″W
- Area: 112 acres (45 ha)
- Built: 1891
- Built by: WPA; Et al.
- Architectural style: Late 19th And 20th Century Revivals, WPA Rustic
- NRHP reference No.: 91000793
- Added to NRHP: June 26, 1991

Washington Park is a historic public park and national historic district located on Lake Michigan at Michigan City, Indiana. The park encompasses 13 contributing buildings, three contributing sites, 11 contributing structures, and 21 contributing objects, and includes the Michigan City Zoo. It was established in 1891 and later developed by the Works Progress Administration and its predecessors during the 1930s. Notable features include the Soldiers' and Sailors' Monument (1896), former park headquarters building (1934), bandstand (1911), World War I doughboy monument (1926), tennis court (c. 1933), log picnic shelter (c. 1936), and four-story observation tower (1936).

It was listed in the National Register of Historic Places in 1991.
