= Garrettson-Baine-Bartholomew House =

Historic house in Indiana, United States

- U.S. National Register of Historic Places
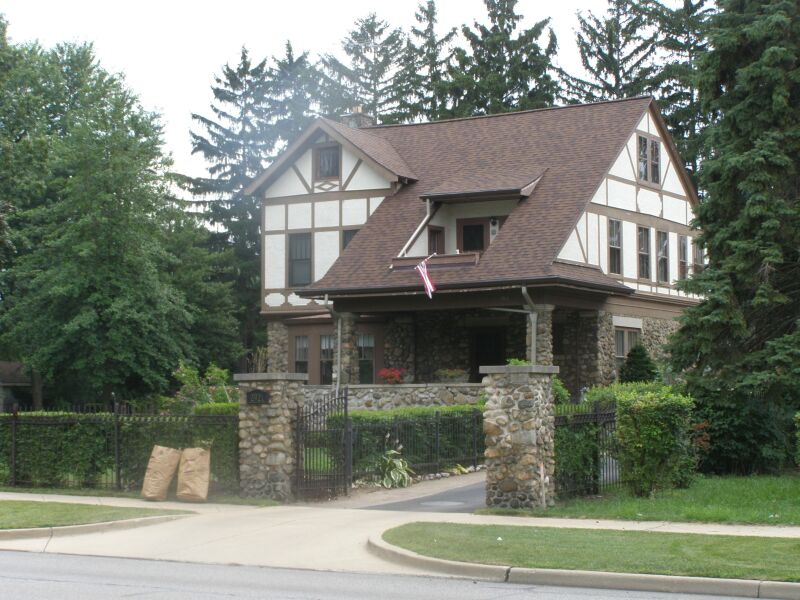
- Garrettson-Baine-Bartholomew House, July 2010

- Location within Indiana Location within the United States
- Location: 2921 Franklin St., Michigan City, Indiana
- Coordinates: 41°41′50″N 86°53′39″W
- Area: less than one acre
- Built: 1908
- Architectural style: Tudor Revival
- NRHP reference No.: 01001340
- Added to NRHP: December 7, 2001

Garrettson-Baine-Bartholomew House is a historic home located at Michigan City, Indiana. It was built in 1908, and is a two-story, asymmetrical, Tudor Revival style dwelling. It features a full-length porch, stone first story, and stucco and half-timbering on the second story.

It was listed on the National Register of Historic Places in 2001.
