= Michigan City East Light =

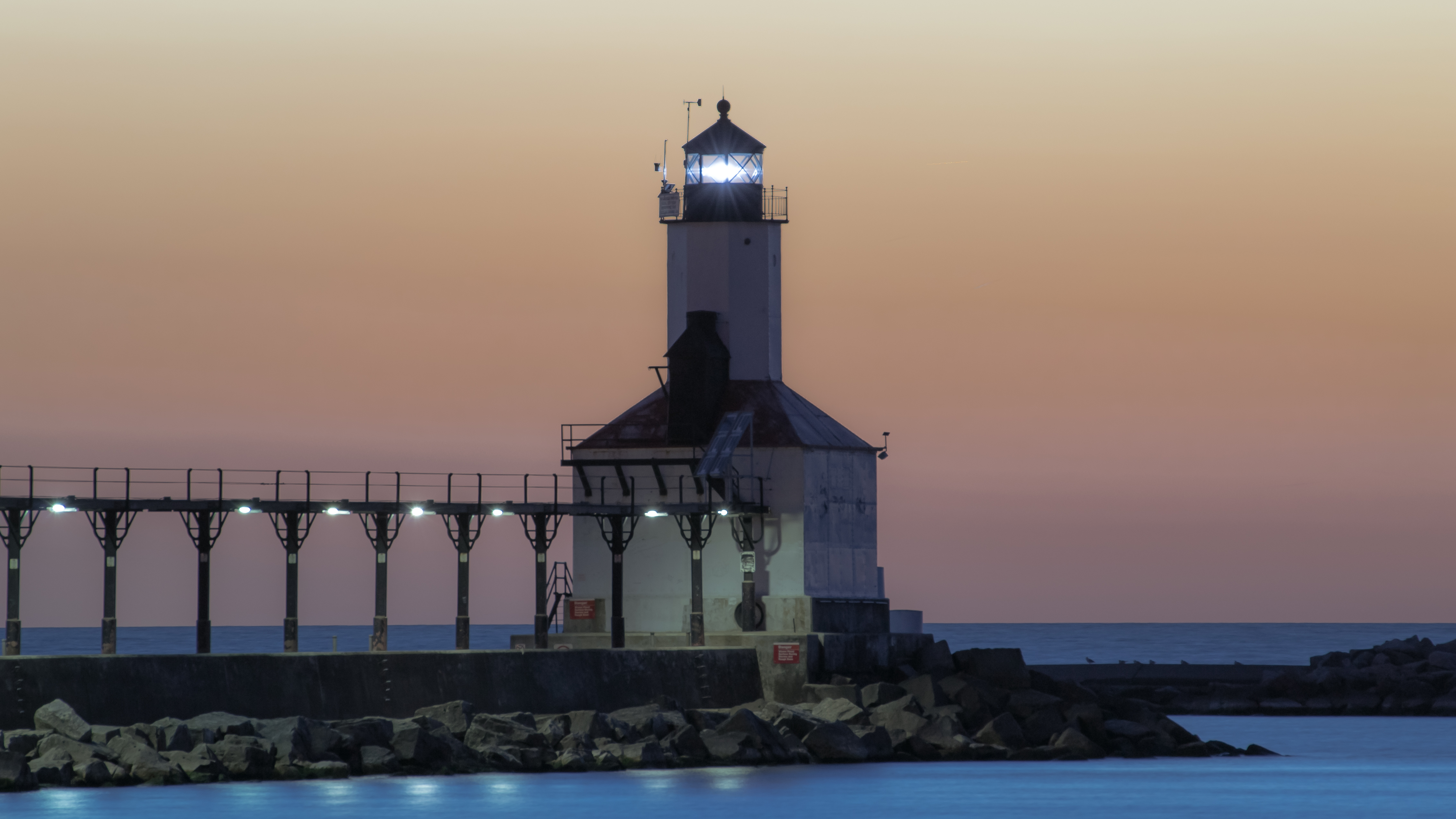
- Location: Washington Park, Michigan City, Indiana
- Coordinates: 41°43′44.5″N 86°54′42″W

Tower
- Constructed: 1904
- Foundation: concrete pier
- Construction: steel brick
- Automated: 1960
- Height: 49 feet (15 m)
- Shape: octagonal on fog signal building
- Markings: white, lantern black; fog signal building roof red
- Heritage: National Register of Historic Places listed place

Light
- Focal height: 50 feet (15 m)
- Lens: Fifth Order Fresnel lens (original), rotating 2130C (current)
- Range: 12 nmi (22 km; 14 mi)
- Characteristic: Fog horn (2 blasts every 30 s).
- Michigan City East Pierhead Light Tower and Elevated Walk
- U.S. National Register of Historic Places
- Area: 1 acre (0.40 ha)
- NRHP reference No.: 88000069
- Added to NRHP: February 17, 1988

The Michigan City Breakwater lighthouse is located in the harbor of Michigan City, Indiana.

This is the successor to the Old Michigan City Light, when the lantern, lens and light was moved to the new light at the end of the newly extended pier.

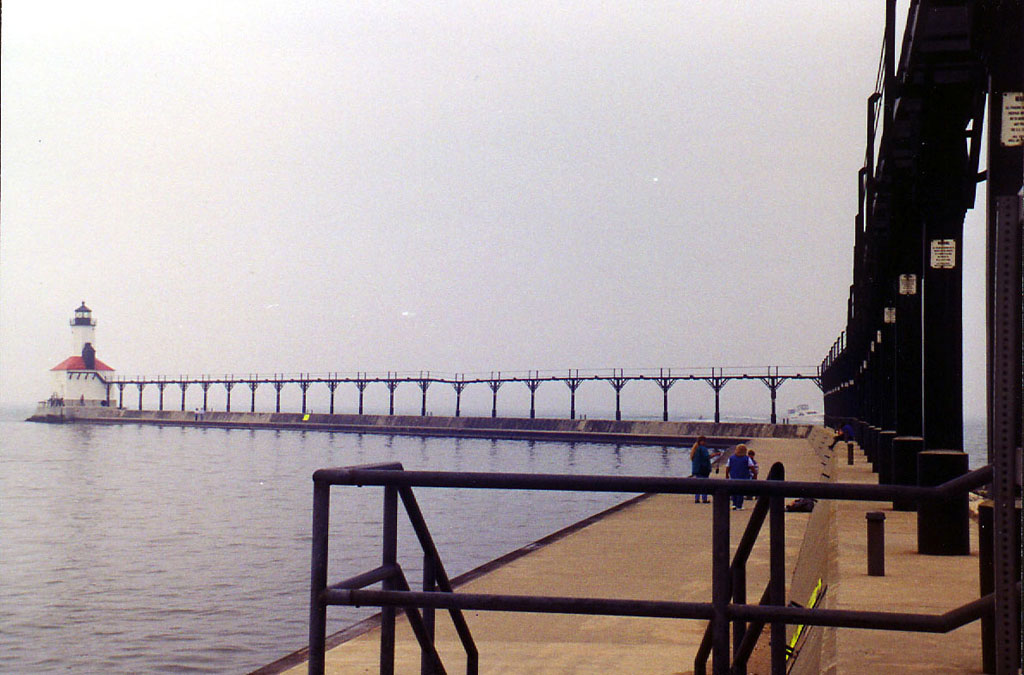
Walkway to lighthouse

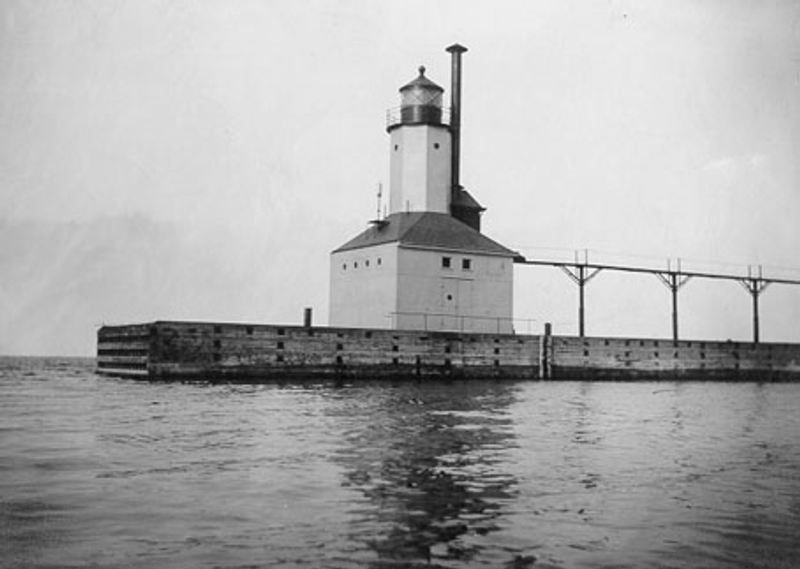
Undated US Coast Guard archive photo

This is one of very few lights on the Great Lakes which still has the iron walkway atop the pier (see Manistee Pierhead lights and Grand Haven South Pierhead Inner Light).

There has been a lighthouse in Michigan City for 170 years. However, "most people in Indiana don't realize there is a lighthouse in the state." Mayor Oberlie passes out lapel pins to illustrate its importance and scope. He calls Lake Michigan "the city's crown jewel," which became prominent when he was city planner in the 1970s.

In May 2007, this aid to navigation was deemed excess by the Coast Guard. It was offered at no cost to eligible entities, including federal, state and local agencies, non-profit corporations, educational agencies, or community development organizations under the terms of the National Historic Lighthouse Preservation Act. "According to Mayor Chuck Oberlie, Michigan City filed a letter of interest for the lighthouse and will seek ownership."

It is one of a dozen past or present lighthouses in Indiana.

The old 1858 lighthouse, near the entrance to the park, is open as a museum every day except Mondays from 1 to 4 p.m.

== See also ==
- Lighthouses in the United States
- National Historic Lighthouse Preservation Act
