= United States Post Office (Michigan City, Indiana) =

- Michigan City Post Office
- U.S. National Register of Historic Places
- U.S. Historic district – Contributing property
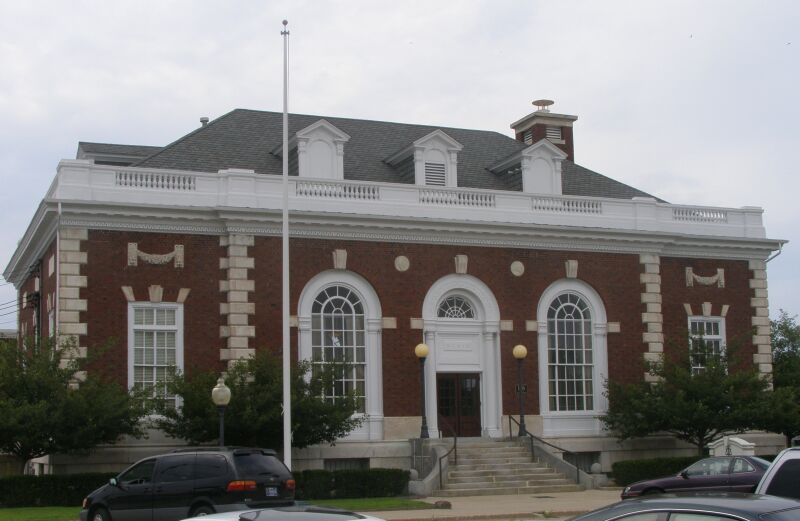
- Michigan City Post Office, July 2010

- Location within Indiana Location within the United States
- Location: 126 E. 5th St., Michigan City, Indiana
- Coordinates: 41°43′5″N 86°54′3″W
- Area: less than one acre
- Built: 1909, 1926, 1963
- Architect: Taylor, James Knox
- Architectural style: Georgian Revival
- NRHP reference No.: 00000675
- Added to NRHP: June 15, 2000

Michigan City Post Office is a historic post office building located at Michigan City, Indiana. It was designed by the Office of the Supervising Architect under James Knox Taylor and built in 1909. It is a one-story, Georgian Revival style brick and limestone building. It has a hipped roof behind a balustraded parapet and basement. A rear addition was built in 1926, and expanded in 1963. It housed a post office until 1973.

It was listed on the National Register of Historic Places in 2000. It is located in the Franklin Street Commercial Historic District.

== See also ==
- List of United States post offices
