= Franklin Street Commercial Historic District =

Historic district in Indiana, United States

- U.S. National Register of Historic Places
- U.S. Historic district
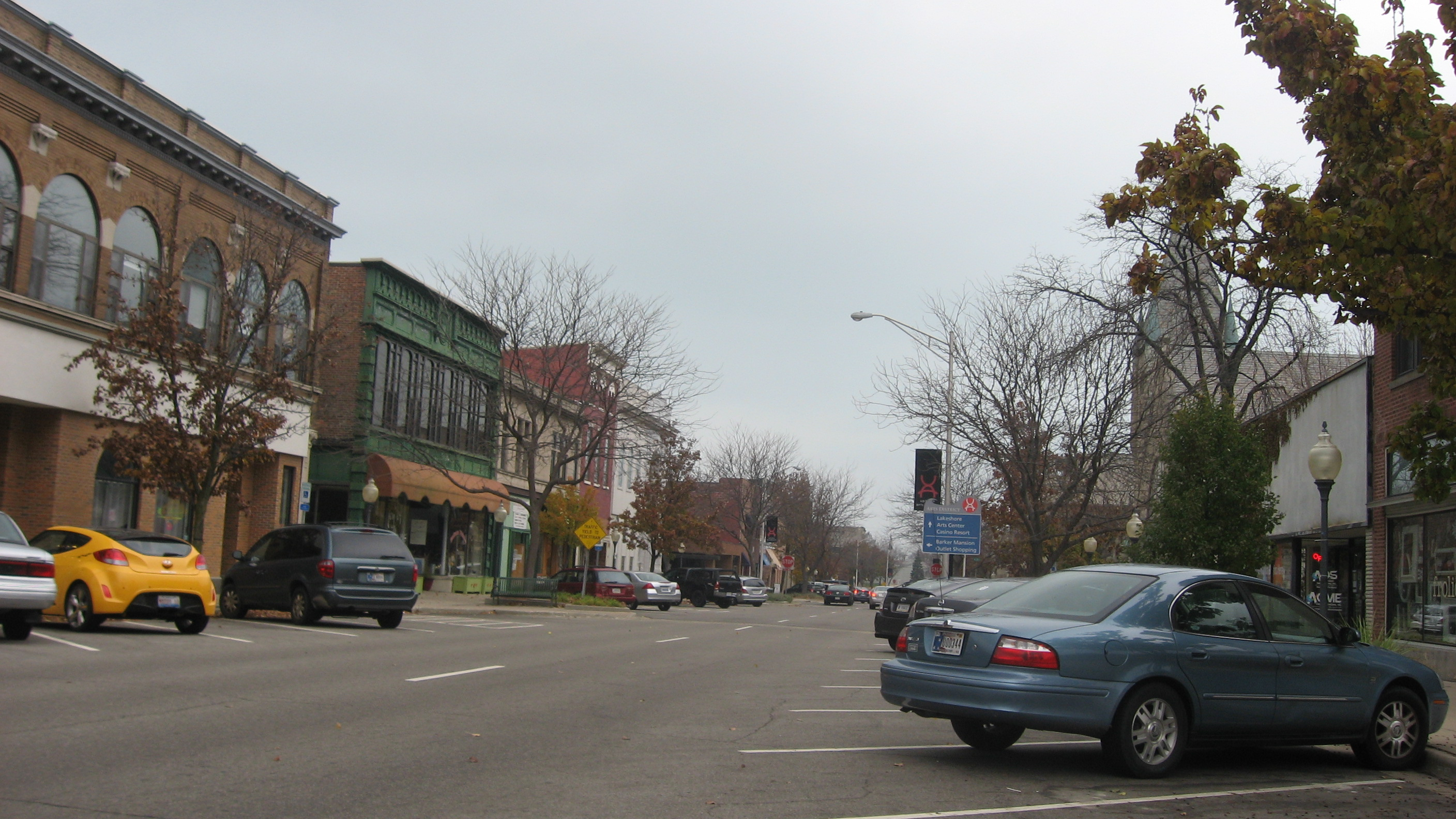
- Franklin Street, downtown Michigan City, November 2013

- Location within Indiana Location within the United States
- Location: Bounded by Pine, 4th, and 11th Sts., and the alley between Franklin and Washington Sts., Michigan City, Indiana
- Coordinates: 41°42′51″N 86°54′01″W
- Area: 43.4 acres (17.6 ha)
- Architect: Taylor, James Knox; Boonstra, Samuel; Nichol, Sholer, and Hoffman; Starbuck, Henry F.
- Architectural style: Italianate, Gothic Revival, Queen Anne, Classical Revival, Tudor Revival
- NRHP reference No.: 13001013
- Added to NRHP: December 31, 2013

Franklin Street Commercial Historic District is a national historic district located at Michigan City, Indiana. The district encompasses 73 contributing buildings and 1 contributing object in the central business district and surrounding residential section of Michigan City. It developed between about 1875 and 1955, and includes examples of Italianate, Gothic Revival, Queen Anne, Classical Revival, and Tudor Revival style architecture. Located in the district is the separately listed Michigan City Post Office (1909–1910). Other notable buildings include the Staiger House (c. 1908), Earl House (c. 1890, 1917), M & M Diner (1955), Zorn Building (1907), St. Paul's Lutheran Church (1876) and rectory (1888), First Federal Savings Bank (c. 1950), Aicher Block (1914), Brinkman Building (c. 1917), Trinity Episcopal Church (1889), Merchants National Bank Building (1926), Ledbetter Building (1908), Rodenbeck Saloon (c. 1894), First Methodist Episcopal Church (1922), Barker Hall (1929), Masonic Temple (1922–1923), and the Salvation Army Building (1925).

It was listed in the National Register of Historic Places in 2013.
