= Michigan City Generating Station =

Power plant in Michigan City, Indiana, US

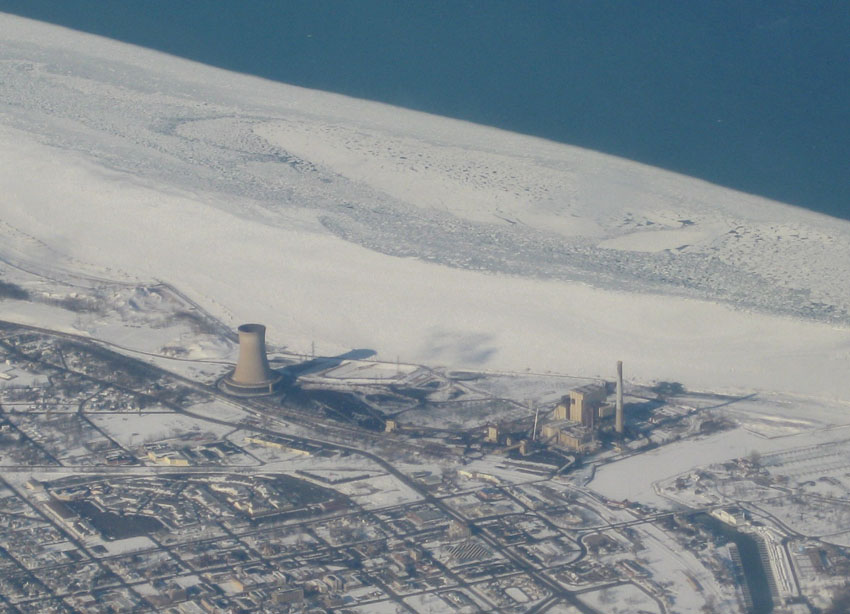
- Aerial photo of Michigan City Generating Station in January 2009
- Country: United States
- Location: Michigan City, Indiana
- Coordinates: 41°43′16″N 86°54′35″W
- Status: Operational
- Commission date: Unit 12 (coal): May, 1974; Unit 2 (gas): Nov, 1950; Unit 3 (gas): Oct, 1951
- Owner: NiSource

Thermal power station
- Primary fuel: Subbituminous and Bituminous coal, natural gas
- Turbine technology: Steam turbine

Power generation
- Nameplate capacity: 680 MWe

External links
- Commons: Related media on Commons

Michigan City Generating Station is a coal and natural gas-fired power plant located on the shore of Lake Michigan in Michigan City, Indiana. It is operated by Northern Indiana Public Service Company (NIPSCO), owned by NiSource.

The station was built on the location of a large sand dune, the Hoosier Slide, which had been removed by mining for glassmaking sand.

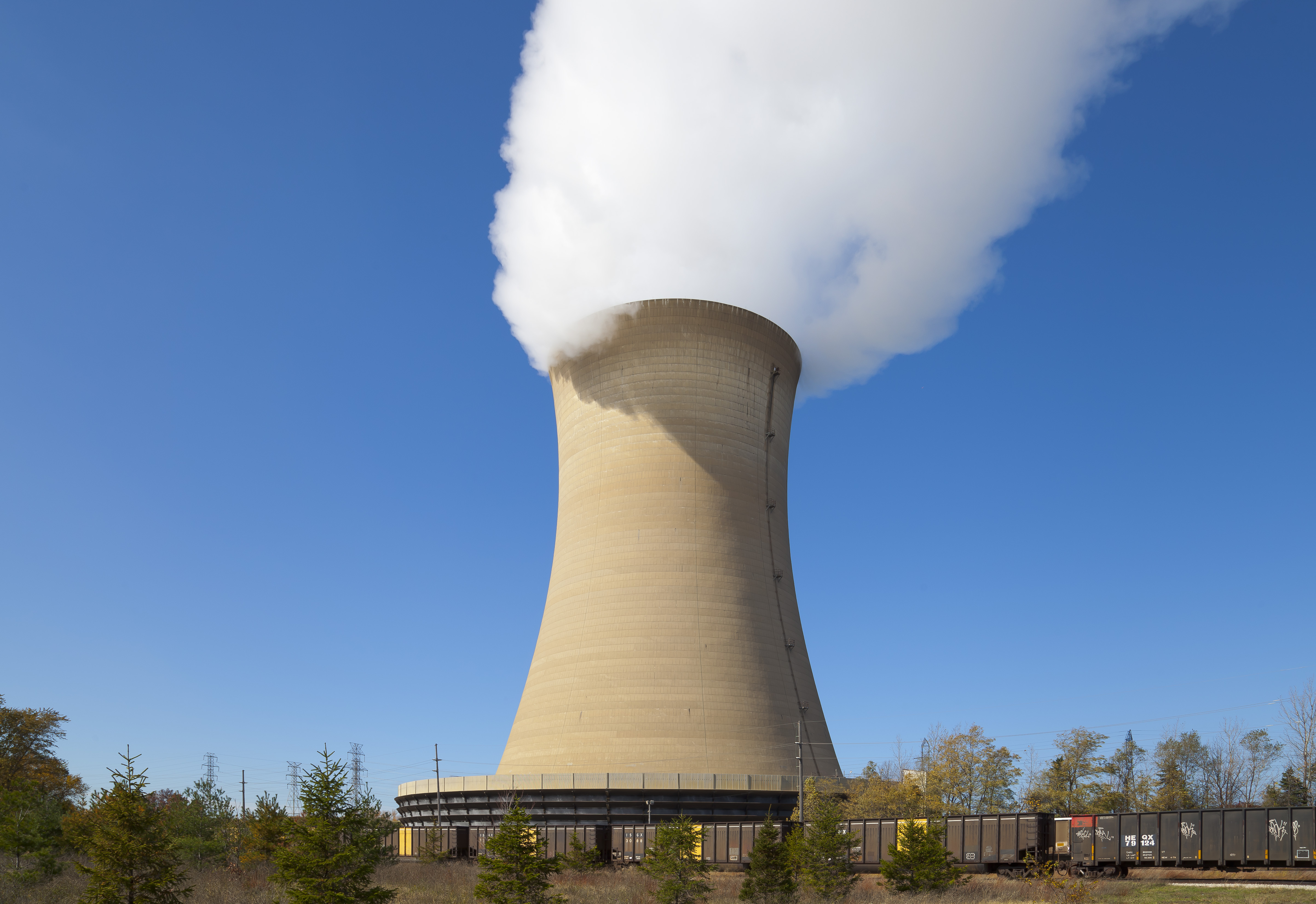
Hyperboloid cooling tower of the Michigan City Generating Station.

== Future ==
NIPSCO announced plans in 2018 to continue to operate the Michigan City Generating Station in the short term but to allow it to run down, pending final shutdown in approximately 2028. The demolition of the station would free up approximately 1 mile of Lake Michigan lakefront space.

== Misconception ==
The use of a hyperboloid cooling tower at the station has been mistaken as evidence for a nuclear power plant at this location when in fact there are no nuclear power plants in the state of Indiana. A nuclear power plant was proposed for the Bailly Generating Station approximately 17 km to the south-southwest but was canceled in 1981.

== See also ==
- List of power stations in Indiana
