= Hoosier Slide =

Historic sand dune

Coordinates: 41°43′16.5″N 86°54′37″W

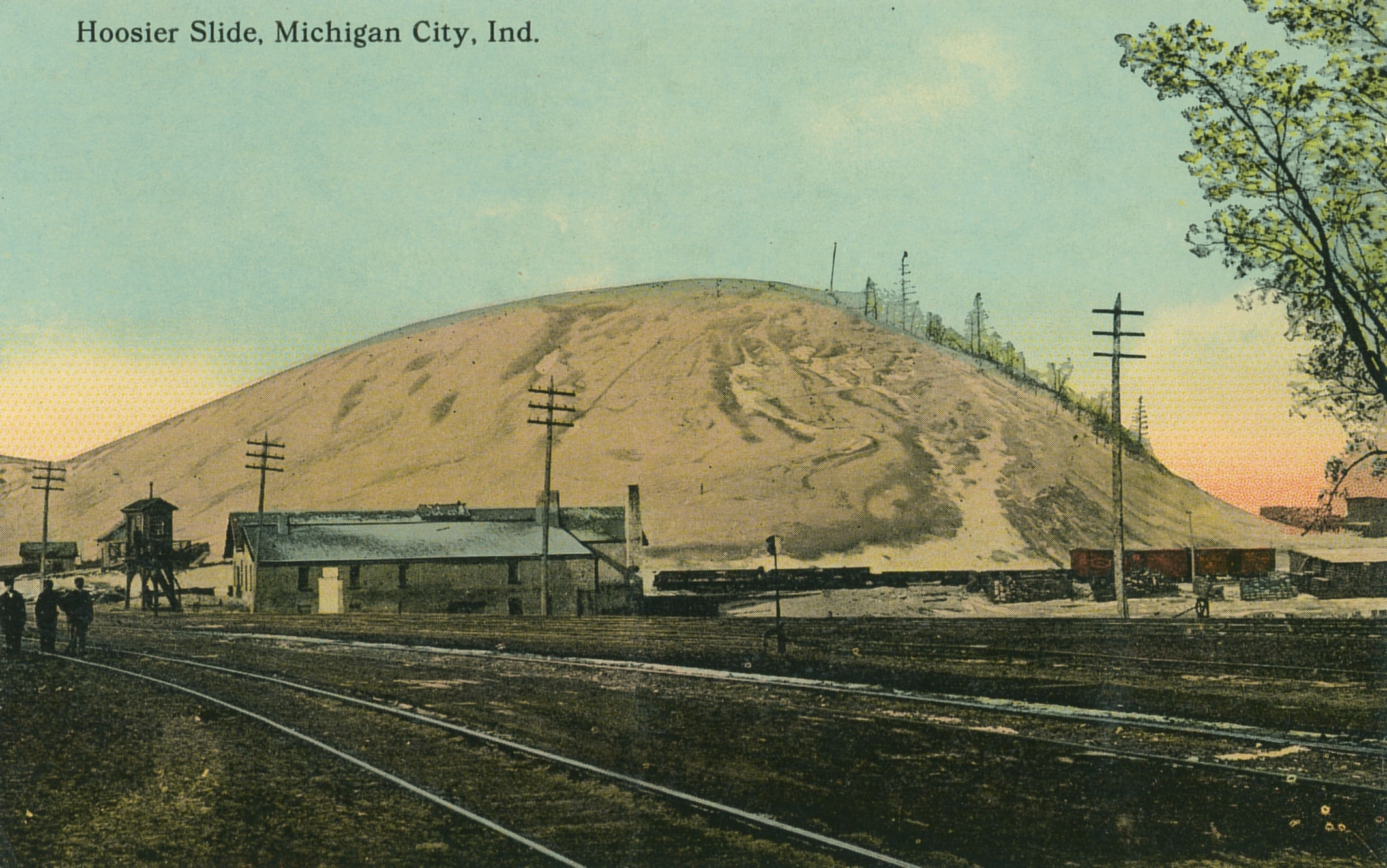
The Hoosier Slide, pictured in a 1907 postcard

The Hoosier Slide was a large sand dune on the shore of Lake Michigan near Michigan City, Indiana. The 200-foot (61 m) dune was a popular tourist destination in the late 19th century, attracting visitors for the view from the top and to slide down the dune's face. At about the same time as it became a tourist attraction, it was found to be a good source of iron-rich sand that would make a light blue-tinted glass. The sand mining activity led to the dune's disappearance by 1920.

== History ==
=== Destination ===
The sand dune stood 200 feet (61 m) tall on the shore of Lake Michigan, just northwest of Michigan City. Originally covered by stubby trees, the hill was revealed as a sand dune when the land was cleared. News accounts estimated that about 180,000 people visited the site each year from the Chicago area until 1920. It gained its name from the popular activity of sliding down the face of the dune. The dune became a popular destination for weddings and recreation, and had famous visitors such as Daniel Webster and Harriet Martineau, who wrote about the beauty of Lake Michigan as seen from Hoosier Slide. United States President William McKinley visited Hoosier Slide on October 17, 1899, where he was honored with a 21-gun salute in celebration of the end of the Spanish–American War.

=== Glassmaking ===
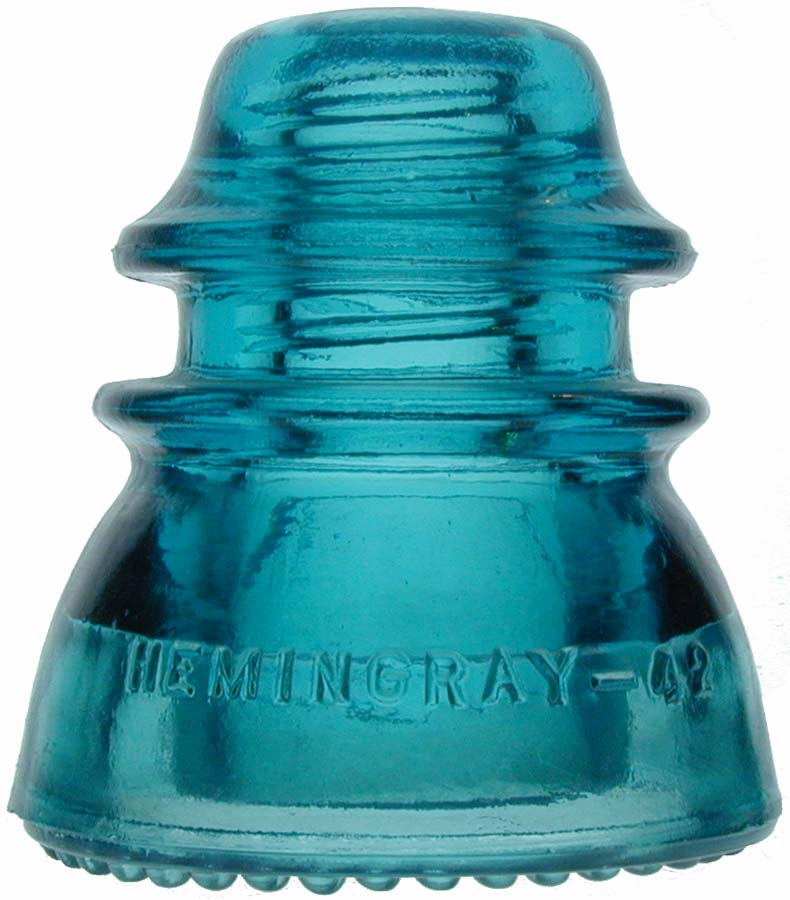
Hemingray blue glass insulator

Sand miners began mining Hoosier Slide in 1890. Glass companies like the Pittsburgh Plate Glass and Ball Corporation had recently established factories in Muncie, Indiana to make use of local sand dunes and natural gas from Findlay, Ohio. Wind-blown sand from the dune was sampled for glassmaking, and due to its iron-rich composition, was found to produce a light aqua-blue glass. Ball produced distinctive "Ball Blue" jars from the sand, which were sold widely. The blue glass was also thought to be beneficial in reducing the deterioration of canned fruit. The Hemingray Glass Company used the sand from Hoosier Slide to produce glass electrical insulators.

As early as 1894, concern was expressed at the disappearance of the dune from mining activity, when it had diminished to 63 feet (19 m). Mining continued until Hoosier Slide had completely disappeared by 1920. A total of 13,500,000 short tons (12,200,000 t) of sand were used for glass, effectively removing the dune in its entirety. However, Ball had enough sand from the dune stored in reserve to continue producing blue jars until 1937. Once their reserves had been exhausted, Ball made clear glass jars, and occasionally made commemorative jars in other colors.

== Site ==
After the dune had been exhausted by sand mining, its site was purchased by Northern Indiana Public Service Co., becoming the site of the Michigan City Generating Station. Public outcry over the disappearance of Hoosier Slide and other dunes led to the creation of legislation which protected remaining dunes in the 1970s and 1980s. Nearby dunes are protected within Indiana Dunes National Park.
