= John H. Barker Mansion =

Historic house in Indiana, United States

- U.S. National Register of Historic Places
- U.S. Historic district – Contributing property
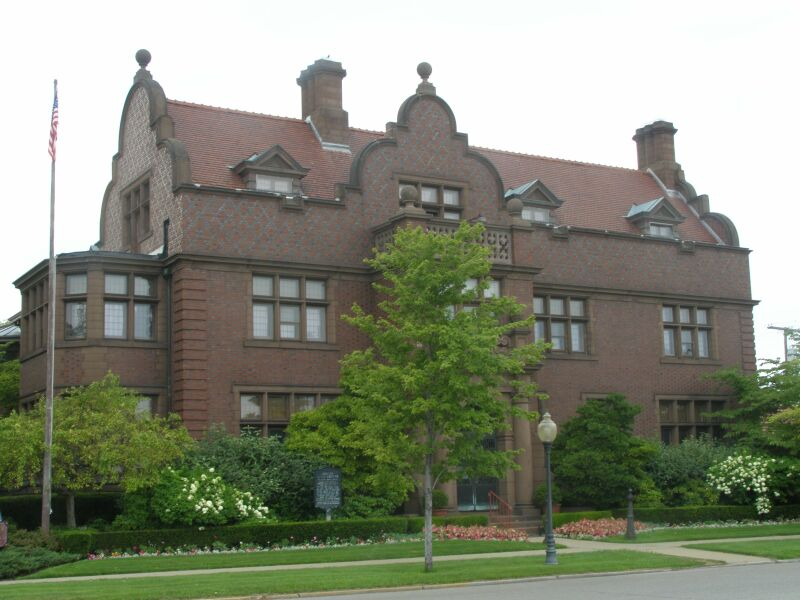

- Location within Indiana Location within the United States
- Location: 631 Washington St., Michigan City, Indiana
- Coordinates: 41°42′54″N 86°54′9″W
- Area: less than one acre
- Built: 1857, 1901-1905
- Architects: Perkins, Fredrick
- Architectural style: English Manor
- NRHP reference No.: 75000027
- Added to NRHP: October 10, 1975

The John H. Barker Mansion is a historic home located in Michigan City, Indiana.

== History ==
The original house was built in 1857 and is a two-story, brick structure that now serves as the rear wing. Between 1905 and 1909, the main block was constructed. The main house is a 2 1/2-story, maroon brick with limestone trim designed as an English Manor house, with 38 rooms, 10 bathrooms, and seven fireplaces.

It was listed on the National Register of Historic Places in 1975. It is located in the Haskell and Barker Historic District.

=== John H. Barker ===
In 1836, at the age of 22, John Barker Sr. (1814–1878) arrived in Indiana from Andover, Massachusetts, looking for new business opportunities. He began as a general merchant, expanded into grain brokerage, before opening a commission house to receive and forward merchandise from ships on the lakes. During this time, he married Cordelia G. Collamer (1818–1894) and raised a family. Two children survived him, daughter, Anna, and son, John H. Barker (1844–1910).

Seeing the potential of railroads, he bought an interest in the manufacture of freight cars. Shortly after his purchase in 1855, the company was renamed Haskell & Barker Car Co. The onset of the American Civil War helped the business prosper through government contracts. As the Car Company prospered, Michigan City prospered. When he retired in 1869, his son left Chicago to return as the general manager of the company. Upon Barker Jr.'s death in 1910, the Car Company was prospering such that he was worth an estimated fifty to sixty million dollars. In 1922, "Haskell & Barker" merged with the Pullman Company, and was then known as Pullman-Standard, a division of Pullman, Inc.

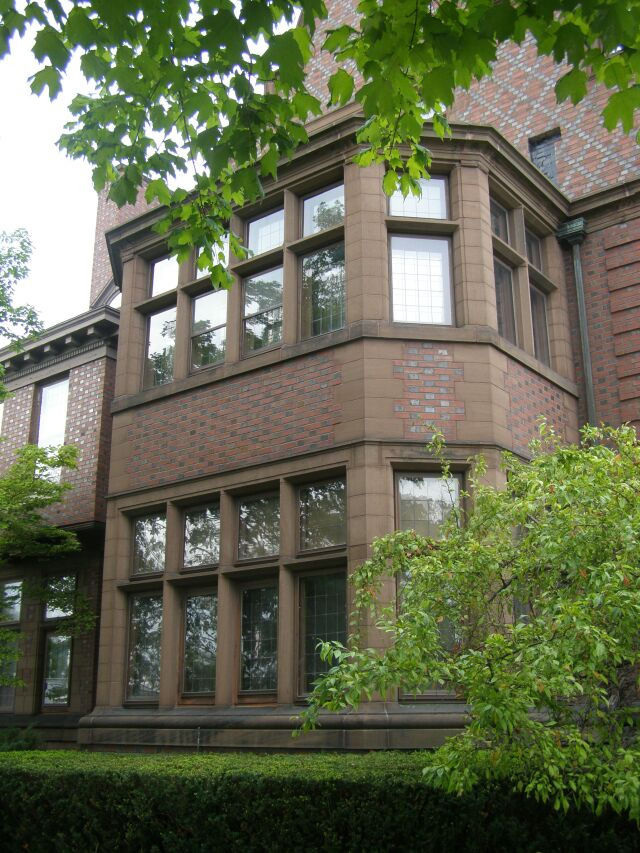
South facade

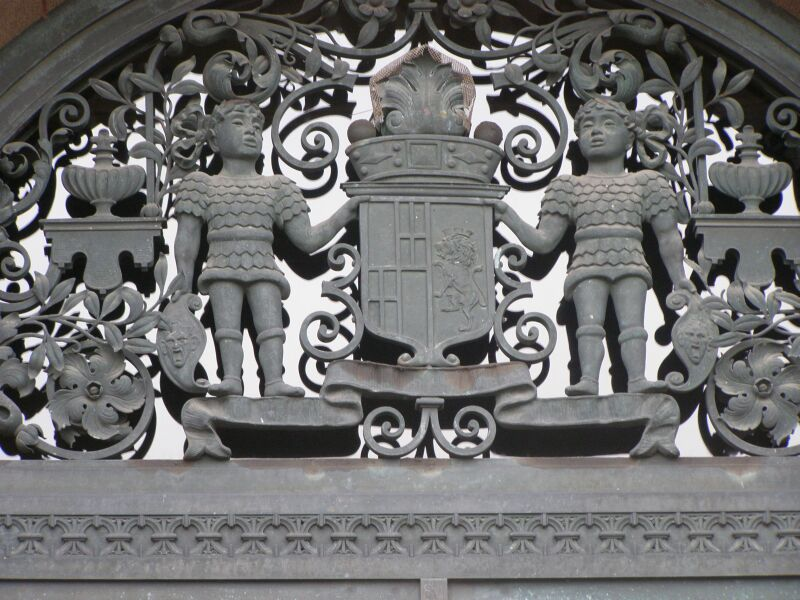
Crest over front door
