= John Barker House =

Historic house in Connecticut, United States

- U.S. National Register of Historic Places
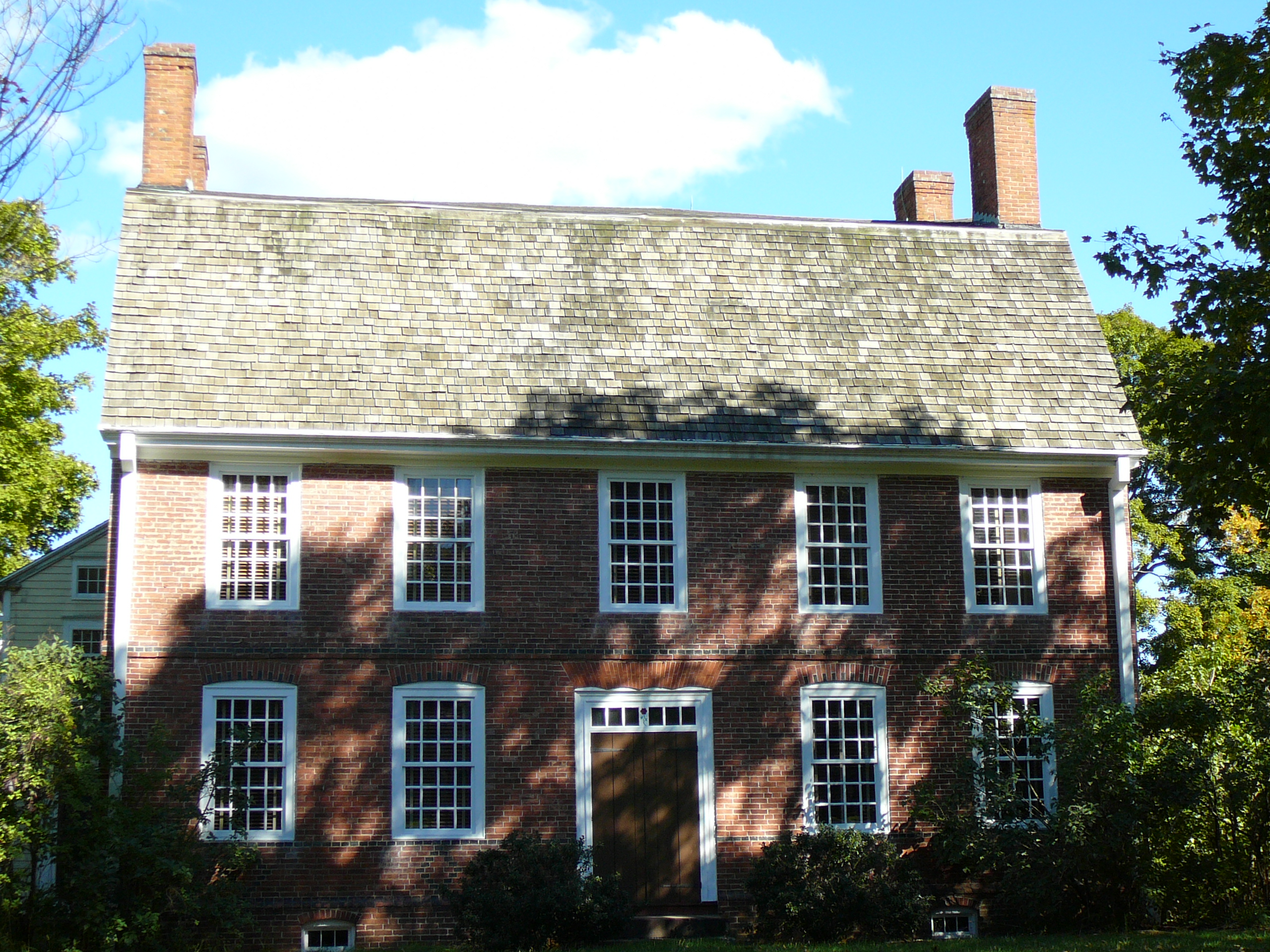

- Location within Connecticut Location within the United States
- Location: 898 Clintonville Road, Wallingford, Connecticut
- Coordinates: 41°24′46″N 72°49′29″W
- Area: 9.9 acres (4.0 ha)
- Built: 1756
- NRHP reference No.: 74002051
- Added to NRHP: August 3, 1974

The John Barker House is a historic house at 898 Clintonville Road in Wallingford, Connecticut. Built in 1756 for a wealthy farmer, it is one of the oldest brick houses in Connecticut, and one of the few of the period with a gambrel roof. It was listed on the National Register of Historic Places in 1974.

== Description and history ==
The John Barker House is located in a rural-residential area of far southern Wallingford, on the east side of Clintonville Road south of Molly O'Neill Road. It is a 2 1/2-story brick building, covered by a gambrel roof with chimneys at the ends. The main facade is five bays wide, with a center entrance topped by a six-light transom window and framed by molded trim. Ground-floor windows are set in openings that have a slightly arced top, with a soldier brick lintel; second-story windows are butted against the eave. The interior follows a typical period central-hall plan, and retains many original finishes and features. Particularly notable is the brickwork in the fireplaces, and the distinctive moulding and paneling in the principal upstairs chamber.

The house was built in 1756 for John Barker, a prosperous farmer who owned slaves. Barker's grandfather had been a merchant in New Haven who did extensive trade with Barbados. The house is stylistically similar to Connecticut Hall, built in 1752 at Yale, suggesting the builders were familiar with it. Clay for the bricks was probably quarried from deposits on the Quinnipiac River bottomlands in the North Haven area.u

== See also ==
- National Register of Historic Places listings in New Haven County, Connecticut
