= Elston Grove Historic District (Michigan City, Indiana) =

Historic district in Indiana, United States

- U.S. National Register of Historic Places
- U.S. Historic district
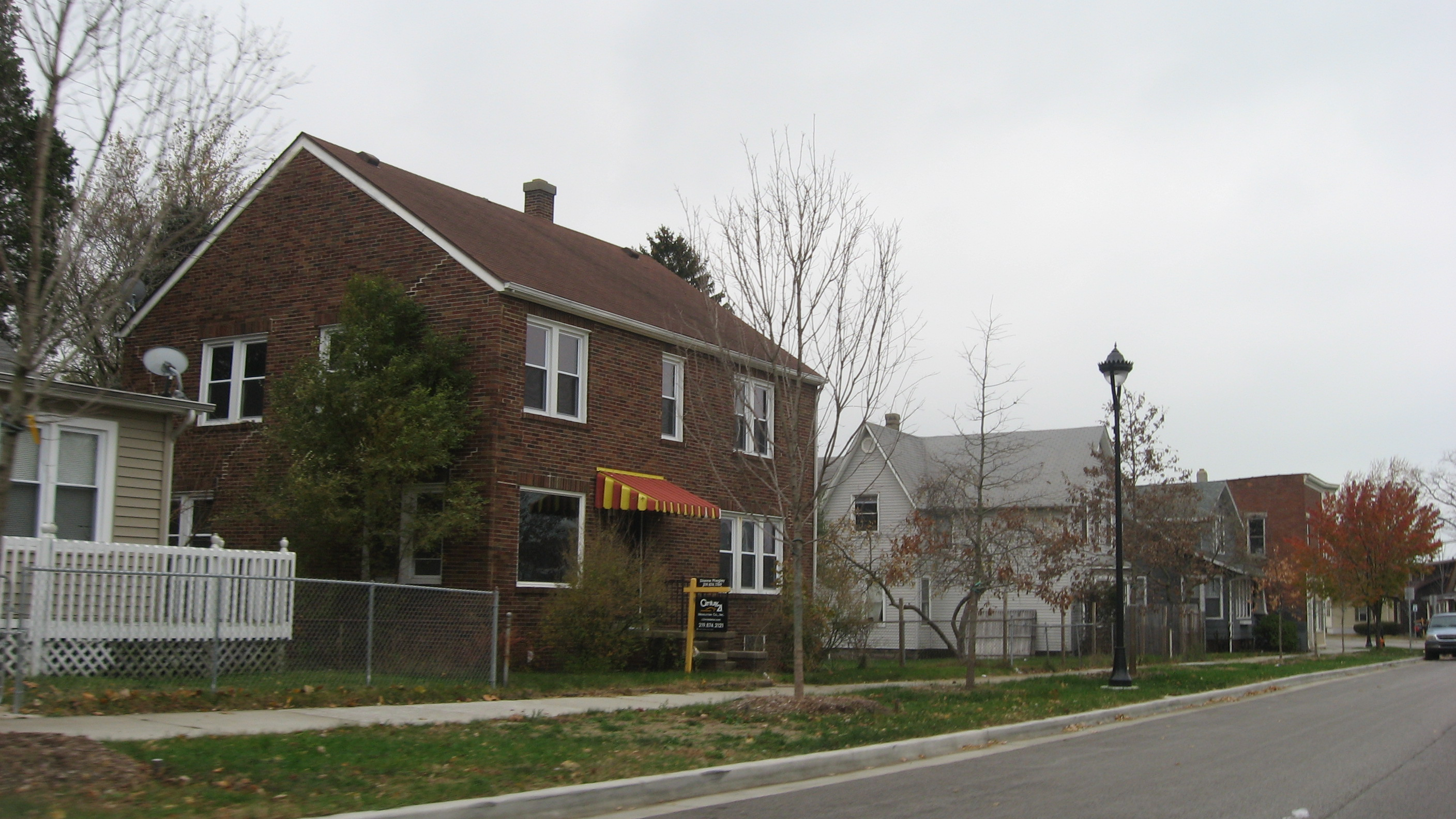
- Tenth west of York, November 2013

- Location within Indiana Location within the United States
- Location: Bounded by Michigan Boulevard and 11th, Pine, and 6th Sts., Michigan City, Indiana
- Coordinates: 41°42′49″N 86°53′35″W
- Area: 92 acres (37 ha)
- Architectural style: Italianate, Greek Revival, Queen Anne, Colonial Revival, Bungalow/Craftsman
- NRHP reference No.: 13000759
- Added to NRHP: September 25, 2013

Elston Grove Historic District is a national historic district located at Michigan City, Indiana. The district encompasses 215 contributing buildings and one contributing structure in a predominantly residential section of Michigan City. It developed between about 1860 and 1963, and includes examples of Italianate, Greek Revival, Queen Anne, Colonial Revival, and Bungalow / American Craftsman style architecture. Notable buildings include the A.J. Henry House (1904, 1908), Kubik Doctors Office (1953), Manny House (1902), Haskell-Boyd House (1875, c. 1917), Moritz House (1911), Zorn Brewey (c. 1877), Petti Grocery (c. 1900), Luchtman Building (c. 1900), Dr. Ginther House (1940), Sherman Apartment Building (1921), First Baptist Church (1914), the Public Library (1896–1897), and the Adventist Church - Christian Science Church (c. 1860).

It was listed in the National Register of Historic Places in 2013.
