= Barker House (Michigan City, Indiana) =

Historic house in Indiana, United States

- U.S. National Register of Historic Places
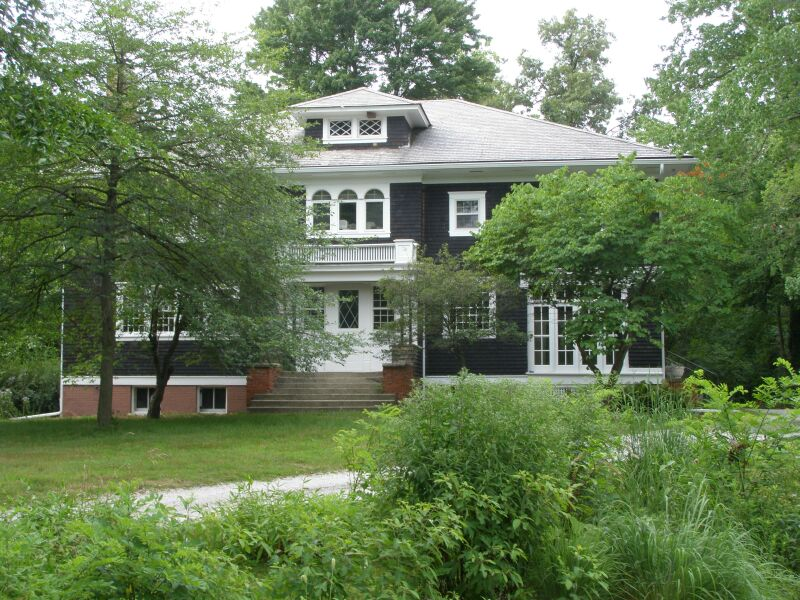
- Barker House, July 2010

- Location within Indiana Location within the United States
- Location: 444 Barker Rd., Michigan City, Indiana
- Coordinates: 41°41′17″N 86°52′58″W
- Area: 3.7 acres (1.5 ha)
- Built: c. 1900
- Architectural style: Shingle Style, Prairie School
- NRHP reference No.: 01001349
- Added to NRHP: December 7, 2001

Barker House is a historic home located at Michigan City, Indiana. It was built about 1900, and is a two-story, rectangular, Shingle Style / Prairie School style dwelling. It sits on a brick foundation and has a hipped roof with hipped dormer and has a modified American Foursquare plan. Also on the property are the contributing carriage house, dance studio, and garage. The house and grounds are occupied by the Save the Dunes offices and Barker Woods Nature Preserve, which is managed by Shirley Heinze Land Trust.

It was listed on the National Register of Historic Places in 2001.
