= Washington Park Zoo =

Zoo in Michigan City, Indiana, United States

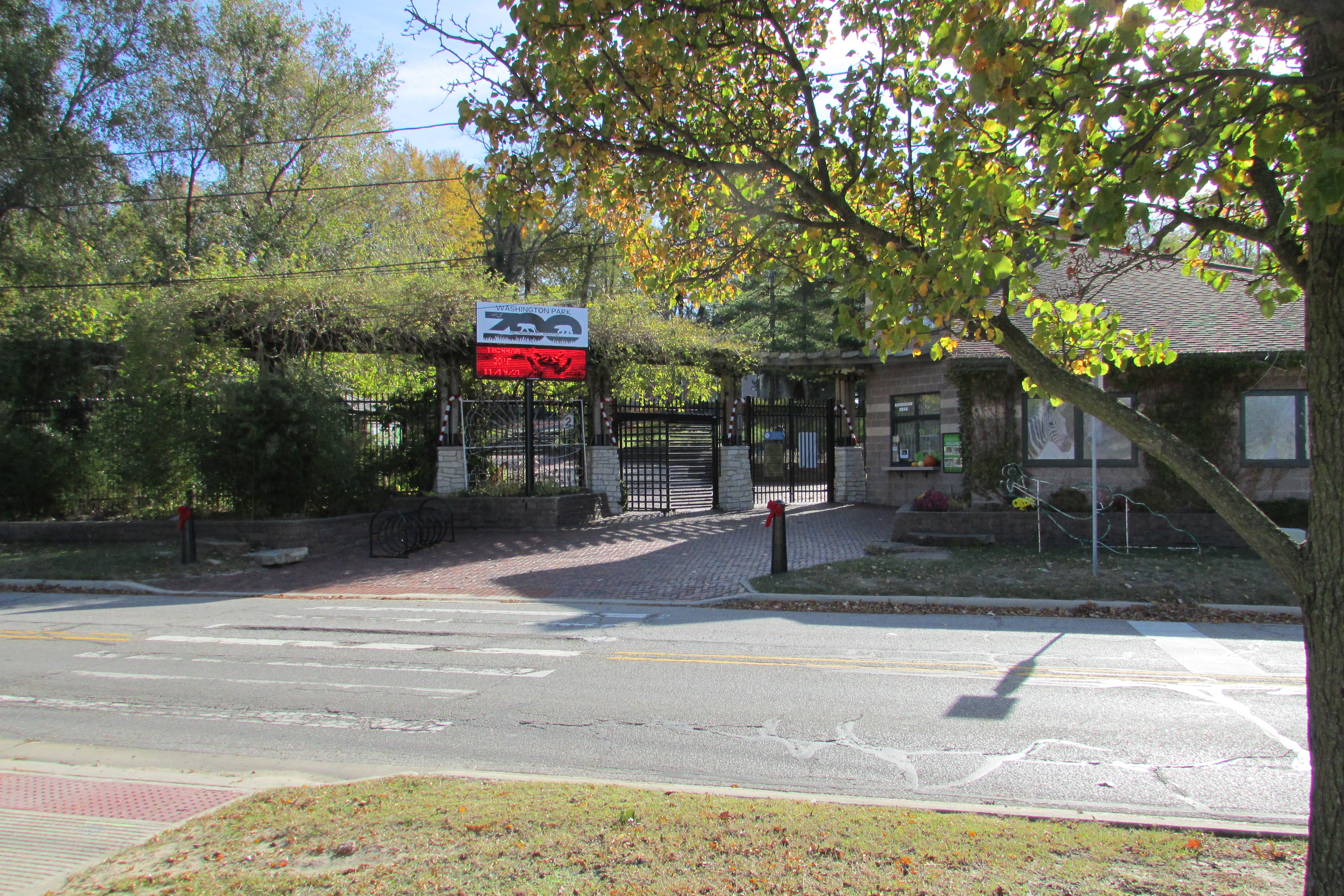
- Entrance
- Interactive map of Washington Park Zoo
- 41°43′31″N 86°54′03.43″W
- Date opened: 1928
- Location: Michigan City, Indiana, United States
- Land area: 9 acres (3.6 ha)
- No. of animals: ~220
- No. of species: ~90
- Annual visitors: 85,000+ (Note: Winter seasonal closure impacts annual attendance.)
- Public transit: Michigan City Transit
- Website: www.washingtonparkzoo.com

The Washington Park Zoo is a zoo located in Washington Park, Michigan City, Indiana, which covers 15 acres (61,000 m^{2}) on a hilly sand dune close to the southeastern tip of Lake Michigan. The park and zoo were listed in the National Register of Historic Places in 1991.

The zoo exhibits more than 220 animals of 90 species originating throughout the world. Under the zoo's new assessment and initiatives plan, the zoo is being modernized so animals are exhibited in natural settings, surrounded by botanical plantings. Among the exhibits are grizzly bears and Bengal tigers. The Castle building exhibits various educational species like fennec fox, corn snakes, and a living beehive. The Winged Wonders has a walk through aviary. The Farm exhibits miniature domestic horses, donkeys, pigs, and goats which may be fed by guests.

== History ==
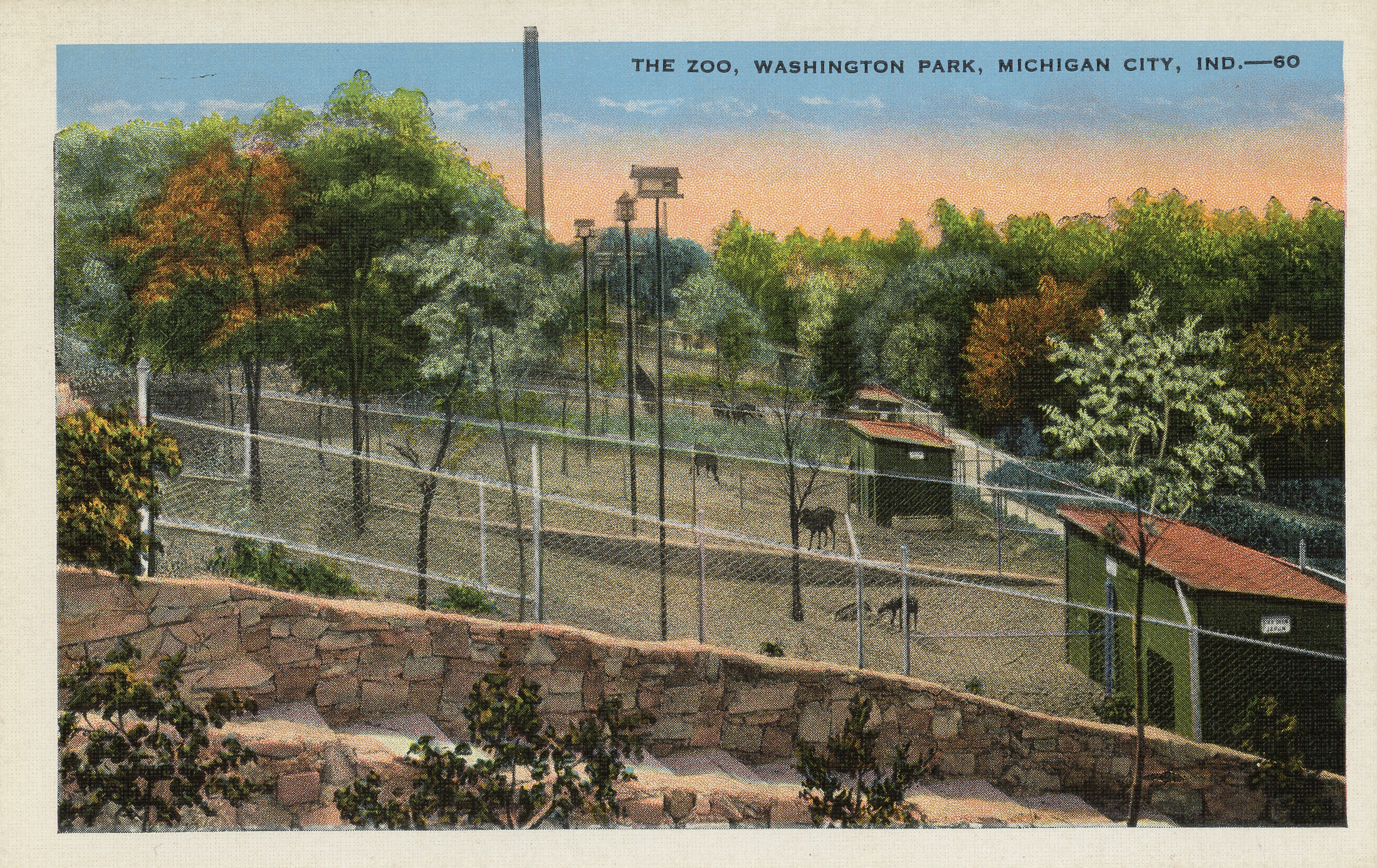
Washington Park Zoo, circa 1940.

In 1925, a retired animal trainer moved his brown bear "Jake" to the Washington Park lakefront in the hopes that the bear would get more visitors in the park and not be so isolated. Some additional animals and birds were brought to the park by the fire department, which at the time occasionally sheltered abandoned exotic animals, and the city had the beginnings of a zoo. Planning for a zoo board started in 1927, and the first board was appointed by City Manager Albert R. Couden in 1928. Hopes were that the zoo would provide recreation and education not only for residents of Michigan City but also to the thousands who spent their summers at nearby resorts.

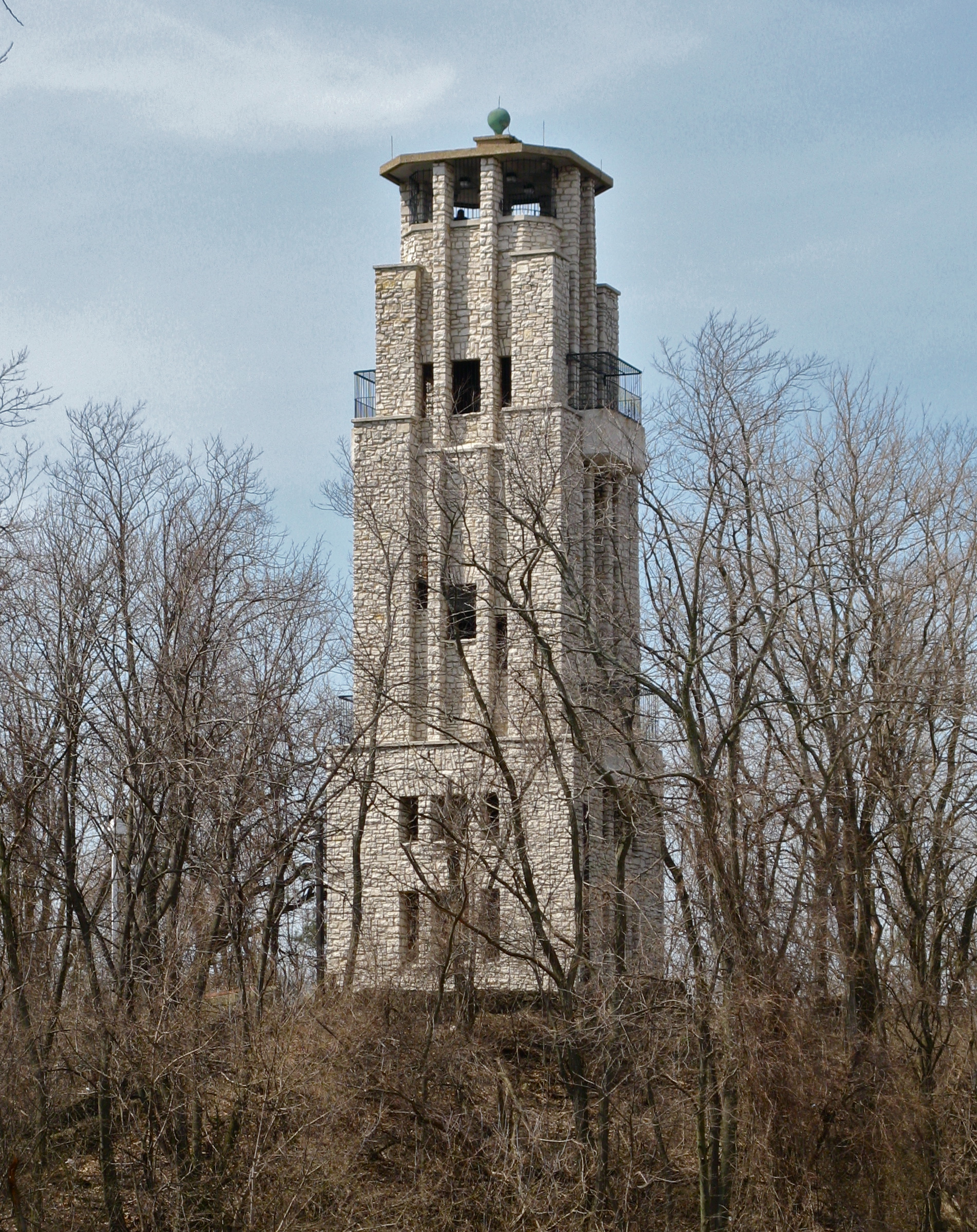
Washington Park Zoo Tower — The stone lookout tower was designed by Fred Ahlgrim in an Art Deco style.

The zoo was moved to its current location in the sand dunes overlooking the lake, and the zoo board began building new exhibits using only "scrounged" and donated materials. With the advent of the Federal Emergency Relief Administration (FERA), that Civil Works Administration (CWA), and later the Works Progress Administration (WPA), the zoo was completely redesigned. It is believed to be the only zoo in Indiana completely designed and landscaped by these agencies, with the WPA supplying labor as long as the zoo board could find the materials. Eleven buildings in the zoo are on the National Register of Historic Places.

Monkey Island was completed in 1934. This was an island with a surrounding moat, a high exterior wall, an access tunnel for the animals from their indoor enclosures. Currently, the island houses a family of Ringtail lemurs and there are plans to renovate the exhibit in the future.

An observation tower east of the zoo that overlooks the lake, and the "castle" that houses small mammals followed by 1937. The tower is a creation of a steel faced with limestone and the roof is topped with a spherical ornament reported to be a compression chamber from the city's first fire engine.

A feline house was constructed in 1977 using artificial artwork to create more naturalistic surroundings for the animals. A new elephant house opened in 1978 and housed the zoo's elephants until 1990 when a decision was made to stop exhibiting them, and the building was converted into an education facility. The three elephants resident at that time were relocated to the North Carolina Zoo, Have Trunk Will Travel, and the Riddles Elephant and Wildlife Sanctuary.

In 2004, the zoo opened a new main entrance, a new gift shop and initiated repairs on the observation tower and the walk-through aviary (2005), opened the North American Carnivore exhibit with grizzly bears, mountain lion, and river otters (2007), and opened the Avian Adventure exhibit (2009) where visitors can feed parakeets and cockatiels.

== Animals ==
The zoo generally houses about 250 animals representing between 85 and 100 species. Several are Species Survival Plan (SSP) animals, members of designated endangered species groups. The zoo also acts as a sanctuary for misplaced or illegally obtained wild pets from the area and takes in local animals too injured to survive in the wild.

== Landscaping ==
The landscaping for the zoo and park was initially a major focus. The original building was supplied with watering systems that could provide the water necessary for the sand dune environment of the zoo, and with plants provided by city greenhouses, the landscaping was often as much of an attraction as the animals.

Starting in 1994, many of the existing flower beds were replanted or redesigned, while other areas of the zoo have been replanted to attract native birds and insects, or to provide dietary enrichment for the animals.

== Notes ==
Footnotes
