= Henry F. Barker House =

Historic house in Massachusetts, United States

- U.S. National Register of Historic Places
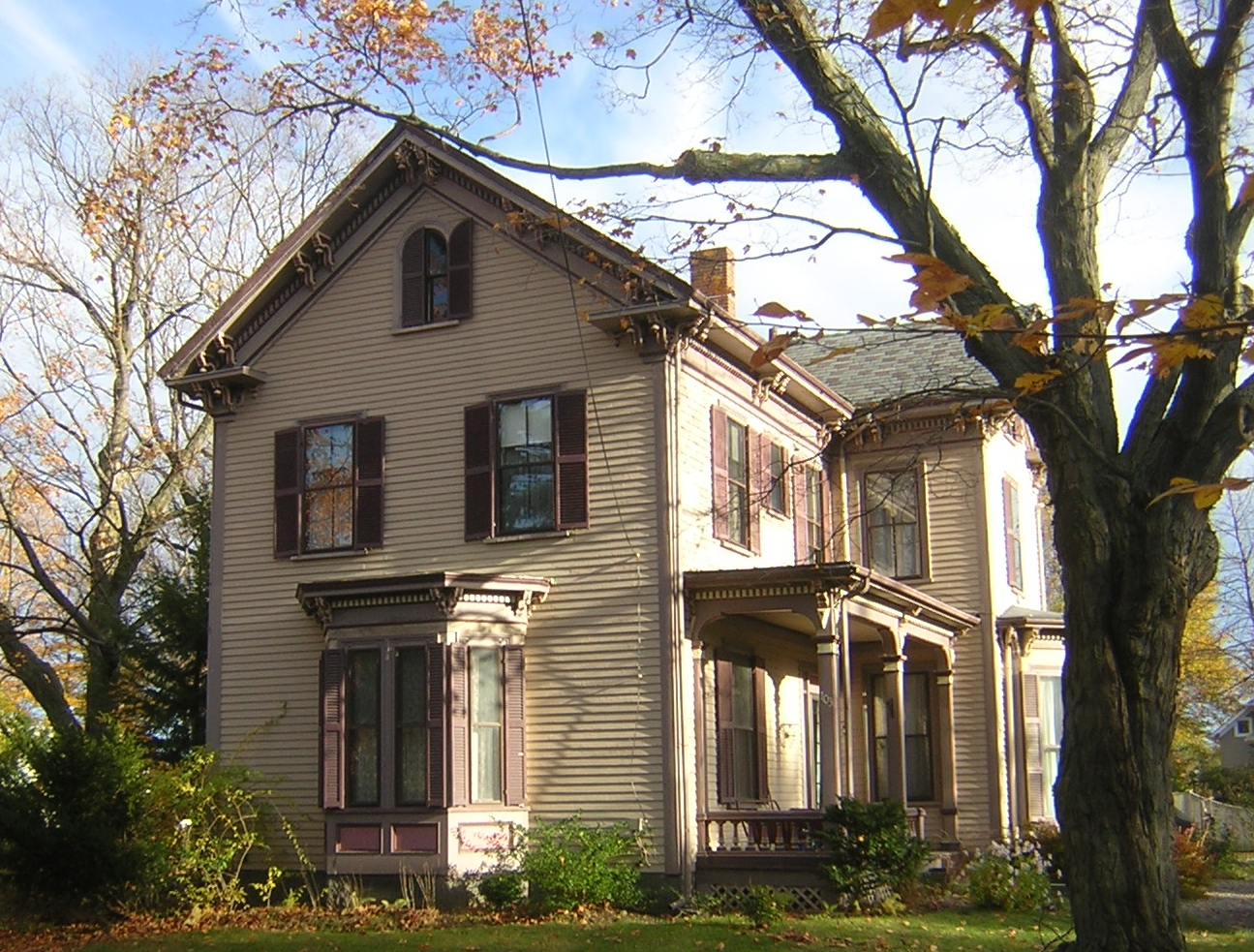

- Location within Massachusetts Location within the United States
- Location: 103 Greenleaf St., Quincy, Massachusetts
- Coordinates: 42°15′26.5″N 71°0′8.5″W
- Built: 1871
- Architectural style: Italianate
- MPS: Quincy MRA
- NRHP reference No.: 89001346
- Added to NRHP: September 20, 1989

The Henry F. Barker House is a historic house at 103 Greenleaf Street in Quincy, Massachusetts. The 2 1/2-story wood-frame house was built in 1871 for Henry F. Barker, owner of some of Quincy's largest granite quarries. It is one of the best-preserved Italianate houses on Greenleaf Street, which is lined with fashionable 19th-century houses. The L-shaped house has paired brackets and dentil moulding in the eaves, projecting polygonal window bays with similar features, and a decorated porch in the crook of the L. The house was listed on the National Register of Historic Places in 1989.

== Henry F. Barker ==
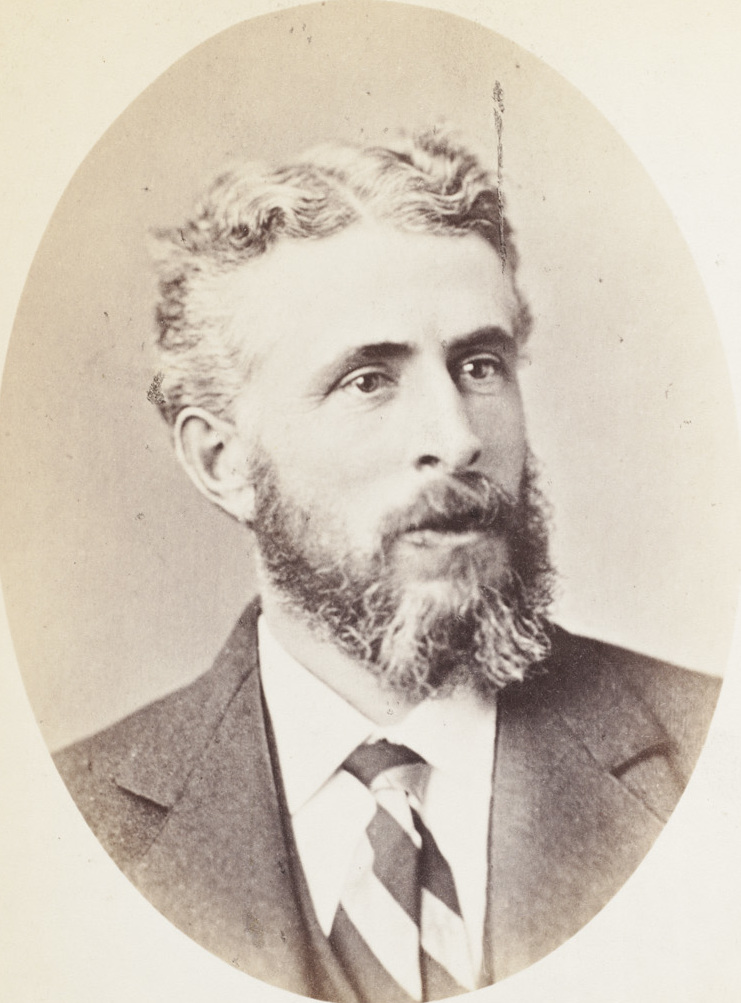

Henry Francis Barker was a state legislator in Massachusetts.

He was born and raised in New England. He was part of the "First Norfolk District".

His home at 103 Greenleaf Street in Quincy, Massachusetts is extant.

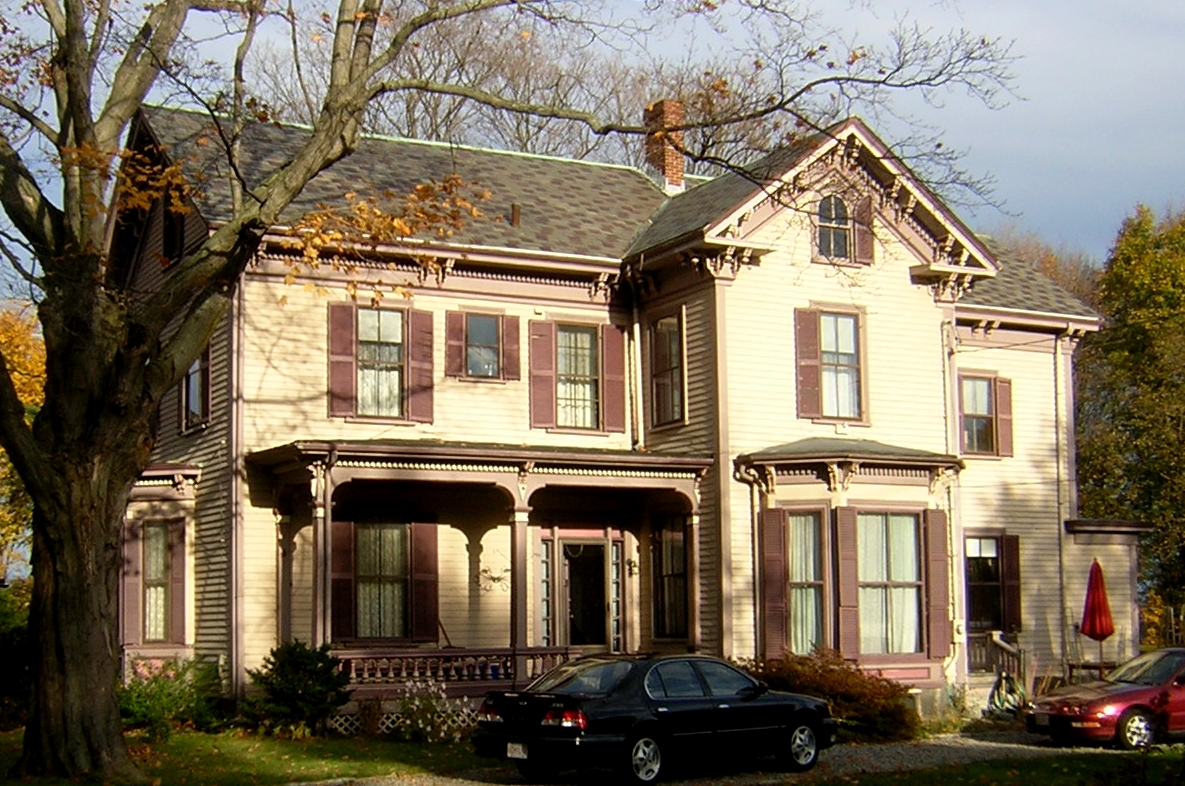

He represented the First Norfolk District. He died in 1878.

== See also ==
- 1877 Massachusetts legislature
- 1878 Massachusetts legislature
- National Register of Historic Places listings in Quincy, Massachusetts
