= List of University of Notre Dame alumni =

This list of the University of Notre Dame alumni, includes graduates, non-graduate former students, and current students of Notre Dame and its graduate and professional schools. Since the university's founding in 1842, there have been 162 commencement exercises at the university. Although only two degrees were awarded to the first class in 1849, today the living alumni, known collectively as the "Fighting Irish", number near 120,000.

== Academia and research ==
=== Educators ===
| Name | Class year | Notability | Reference(s) |
|---|---|---|---|
| Warren J. Baker | 1960; MS 1962 | President of California Polytechnic State University | |
| William Beauchamp | M.Div. 1975; JD. 1981 | President of the University of Portland and former executive vice president of Notre Dame | |
| Michael T. Benson | MNA; 2011 | President of West Virginia University | |
| James Brady | 1959 | Former president of Jacksonville University | |
| Thomas Day | 1952 | Former president of San Diego State University | |
| Charles J. Dougherty | MA 1973; PhD 1975 | President of Duquesne University | |
| John H. Garvey | 1970 | President of The Catholic University of America | |
| Robert E. Glennen | 1962; PhD | Former president of Emporia State University | |
| Philip A. Glotzbach | 1972 | President of Skidmore College | |
| James Gower | Unknown | Co-founder of the College of the Atlantic; Catholic priest and peace activist | |
| Theodore Hesburgh | 1939 | 15th president of Notre Dame, Presidential Medal of Freedom recipient, holds the world record for most honorary degrees received | |
| John I. Jenkins | 1976; MA 1978 | 17th president of Notre Dame | |
| Stephen J. Kopp | 1973 | President of Marshall University | |
| Edward Malloy | 1963; MA 1967; MA 1969 | 16th president of Notre Dame | |
| Michael McGinniss | MA 1978; PhD 1981 | President of La Salle University | |
| Joseph McGowan | 1966; MA 1968 | President of Bellarmine University | |
| Mark O'Dea | 2015 | Theology teacher at St. Raphael Academy and fire dancer | |
| Percy Pierre | 1961 and 1963 | Former president of Prairie View A&M University; acting secretary of the Army | |
| Kevin P. Reilly | 1971 | President of the University of Wisconsin System | |
| Eugene P. Trani | 1961 | President of Virginia Commonwealth University | |
| Jeffrey S. Vitter | 1977 | 17th chancellor of the University of Mississippi | |

=== Nobel laureates ===
| Name | Class year | Notability | Reference(s) |
|---|---|---|---|
| James E. Muller | 1965 | Co-founder of the International Physicians for the Prevention of Nuclear War, which was a co-recipient of the 1985 Nobel Peace Prize | |
| Eric F. Wieschaus | 1969 | Developmental biologist and recipient of the 1995 Nobel Prize in Physiology or Medicine | |

=== Professors, scientists, inventors and researchers ===
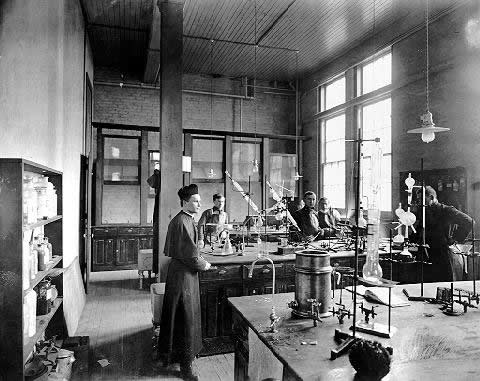
Father Julius Nieuwland

| Name | Class year | Notability | Reference(s) |
|---|---|---|---|
| G. Robert Blakey | 1957; J.D. 1960 | Principal draftsman of RICO, William J. and Dorothy K. O'Neill Professor of Law at the University of Notre Dame, and former chief counsel for the United States House Select Committee on Assassinations | |
| Christina Cogdell | 1994; M.A. | Professor of Design, University of California, Davis | |
| Tom Flanagan | 1965 | Professor of political science at the University of Calgary and former campaign director of Canadian prime minister Stephen Harper | |
| William M. Fowler | 1971; PhD | Professor of History at Northeastern University and former director of the Massachusetts Historical Society | |
| Bob Galvin | 1944 | CEO of Motorola (1959–1986), National Medal of Technology recipient | |
| G. Simon Harak | MA; PhD 1986 | Professor of theology at Marquette University and peace activist | |
| James Massey | 1956 | Former professor of digital technology, information theorist, and cryptographer | |
| Holly Michael | 1998 | Hydrogeologist and associate professor of geology at the University of Delaware's College of Earth, Ocean, and Environment; 2012 National Science Foundation Faculty Early Career Development Award | |
| Charles W. Misner | 1952 | Theoretical physicist, author of Gravitation | |
| William J. Mitsch | 1969 | Distinguished Professor of Environment and Natural Resources, Ohio State University; 2004 Stockholm Water Prize laureate; Wetland scientist; author of Wetlands; pioneer of ecological engineering; founder and director, Olentangy River Wetland Research Park | |
| Carlo Montemagno | PhD 1995 | Engineer and expert in nanotechnology and biomedical engineering | |
| John Anthony Murphy | 1965 | Inventor of ARCnet, the first LAN | |
| Julius Nieuwland | 1899 | Inventor of neoprene | |
| H. Frederik Nijhout | BS 1970 | Evolutionary biologist and the John Franklin Crowell Professor of Biology at Duke University, fellow of the American Academy of Arts and Sciences | |
| James Otteson | 1990 | Director of the BB&T Center for the Study of Capitalism and Thomas W. Smith Presidential Chair in Business Ethics at Wake Forest University, winner of 2007 Templeton Enterprise Award | |
| Charles Pell | MFA 1987 | Co-founder and chief science officer at Physcient, Inc.; speaker at TEDMED 2011; co-founder and director of S&T at Nekton Research (sold to iRobot); director of BioDesign Studio at Duke University; inventor of robotic technology for surgical, maritime defense and pharmaceutical fields | |
| Renee Rabinowitz | J.D. | Psychologist and lawyer | |
| Chet Raymo | 1958; PhD 1964 | Professor of physics at Stonehill College, author, and naturalist | |
| Saskia Sassen | 1971; M.A. 1974; PhD | Robert S. Lynd Professor of Sociology at Columbia University and Centennial visiting professor at the London School of Economics | |
| Tad Schmaltz | 1988; PhD | Professor of philosophy at Duke University | |
| John J. Shea, Jr. | 1943 | Inventor of several ear surgery techniques | |
| Joseph Skelly | 1985 | Professor of History at the College of Mount Saint Vincent, author, Army officer and Iraq War veteran, contributor to National Review | |
| Nancy Snow | 1988 | Professor of Philosophy at Marquette University | |
| Richard William Timm | BA 1945 | Former principal of Notre Dame College, Dhaka; discovered 250 new species of nematodes | |
| Jada Benn Torres | 1999 | Genetic anthropologist and associate professor of Anthropology at Vanderbilt University | |
| Douglas Vakoch | MA 1990 | President of METI (Messaging Extraterrestrial Intelligence), astrobiologist | |
| John Augustine Zahm | 1871 | Biologist and author who worked on reconciling theology and evolution | |

== Art and architecture ==
| Name | Class year | Notability | Reference(s) |
|---|---|---|---|
| Ted Adams | | Publisher and CEO of IDW Publishing | |
| Thom Browne | 1988 | Fashion designer | |
| John Burgee | 1956 | Architect | |
| Frank Ching | 1966 | Architect and author on architecture and design | |
| Marianne Cusato | 1997 | Architecture critic and theorist | |
| David Hayes | 1953 | Sculptor | |
| Edward Noonan | 1953 | Architect and Shimer College president | |
| Theresa Rebeck | 1980 | Playwright | |
| Jennifer Niederst Robbins | 1987 | Web designer | |
| Camilo José Vergara | 1968 | Photographer, 2002 MacArthur Fellow; 2010 Berlin Prize fellowship; 2013 National Humanities Medal | |

== Business ==
| Name | Class year | Notability | Reference(s) |
|---|---|---|---|
| Jim Andrews | 1957 | Co-founder of the Universal Press Syndicate | |
| James Berges | 1969 | Former president of Emerson Electric Company | |
| Debra Cafaro | 1979 | Former CEO of Ventas, Inc. | |
| Mike Crowley | 1985 | President of the Oakland Athletics | |
| Edward J. DeBartolo, Jr. | 1968 | Businessman and former owner of the San Francisco 49ers | |
| Edward J. DeBartolo, Sr. | | Businessman and shopping mall pioneer | |
| William J. DeLaney III | 1977 | CEO of Sysco | |
| Larry Dolan | 1955; JD. 1956 | President of the Cleveland Indians | |
| Jim Fitzgerald | 1947 | Former owner of the Milwaukee Bucks and Golden State Warriors | |
| Joe Garagiola, Jr. | 1972 | Vice president of baseball operations for Major League Baseball | |
| Dan Hesse | 1975 | CEO of Sprint Nextel Corporation | |
| Harry G. John | 1941 | Former president of the Miller Brewing Company and founder of the De Rance Corporation | |
| Alex Jones | 2015 | CEO and founder of the app Hallow | |
| John L. Keeley Jr. | 1962 | Founder of Keeley Asset Management | |
| Andrew J. McKenna | | Chairman of McDonald's | |
| Tom Mendoza | 1973 | Vice chairman of NetApp | |
| Matty Moroun | 1949 | Owner of CenTra, Inc and owner of the Ambassador Bridge border crossing between Detroit and Windsor | |
| Brian Moynihan | 1985; JD | CEO of Bank of America | |
| Vince Naimoli | 1959 | Chairman, Tampa Bay Rays baseball team | |
| Steve Odland | 1980 | Former CEO of Office Depot | |
| William J. O'Neill | 1928 | CEO, Leaseway Transportation | |
| Ted Phillips | 1979 | President and chief executive officer of the Chicago Bears | |
| Philip J. Purcell | 1964 | Chairman and CEO of Morgan Stanley | |
| Jim Rohr | 1970 | CEO of PNC Financial Services | |
| John A. Schneider | 1948 | Former president of CBS | |
| Hubert Schoemaker | | Co-founder of Centocor | |
| Keith Sherin | 1981 | Chief financial officer at General Electric | |
| Max Siegel | 1986; JD 1992 | President of global operations of Dale Earnhardt, Inc. | |
| Peter W. Smith | | Investment banker; Republican activist | |
| Emerson Spartz | 2009 | Media mogul and founder of MuggleNet, GivesMeHope | |
| Brandon Wimbush | 2019 | Chief of Staff, Real American Freestyle | |
| John York | 1971 | Co-owner of the San Francisco 49ers | |

== Entertainment ==
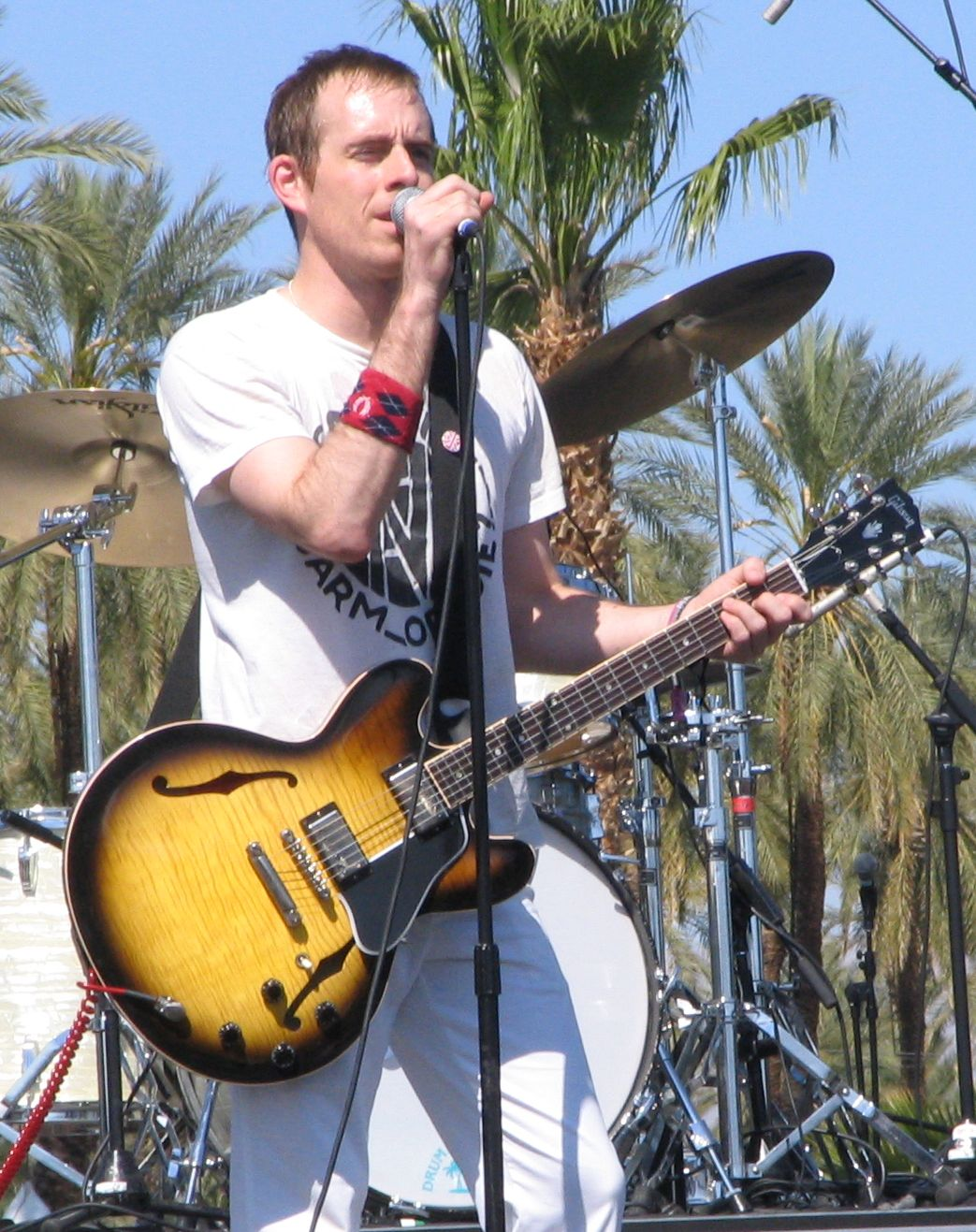
Ted Leo

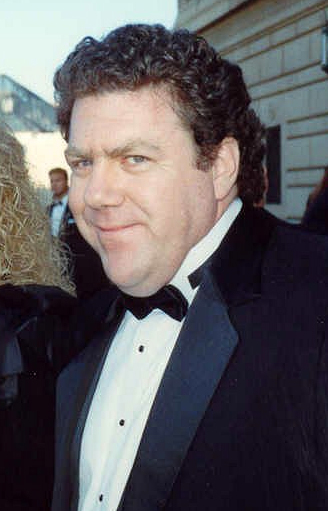
George Wendt

| Name | Class year | Notability | Reference(s) |
|---|---|---|---|
| Albert Alter | 1969 | Clown | |
| Jorge Rivera-Herrans | 2020 | Composer, Creater of Epic the Musical and Voice of Odysseus | |
| Brendan Bayliss | 1998 | Musician, lead singer for Umphrey's McGee | |
| Tony Bill | 1962 | Actor and Academy Award-winning film producer | |
| Tommy Brennan | 2016 | Stand-up comedian, featured player on Saturday Night Live for season 51 | |
| Jimmy Brogan | 1970 | Stand-up comedian, writer and actor; writer on The Tonight Show with Jay Leno for nine years | |
| Mark Consuelos | | Actor, Hiram Lodge on Riverdale | |
| Patrick Creadon | 1989 | Documentary filmmaker, director of Wordplay and Catholics vs. Convicts | |
| Joel Cummins | 1998 | Musician, keyboardist for Umphrey's McGee | |
| Anne Heaton | 1994 | Folk musician | |
| Luigi Jannuzzi | 1977 | Playwright | |
| Brian Kelly | 1953 | Actor best known for his role on Flipper | |
| Bernard Lechowick | 1969 | Television writer and producer | |
| Ted Leo | 1993 | Punk rock musician | |
| William Mapother | 1987 | Actor best known for his role on Lost | |
| Stephen McFeely | 1991 | Screenwriter for Captain America and Avengers: Infinity War | |
| Mike Mirro | 1998 | Musician, former drummer of Umphrey's McGee | |
| Don Ohlmeyer | 1967 | Television producer and former president of NBC West Coast | |
| Regis Philbin | 1953 | Television personality | |
| Richard Riehle | 1970 | Film and television actor | |
| Tim Russell | 1969 | Radio voice actor and announcer, best known for his role on A Prairie Home Companion | |
| Ryan Stasik | 1999 | Musician, bassist for Umphrey's McGee | |
| Austin Swift | 2015 | Actor, Live by Night; brother of Taylor Swift | |
| John Walker | 1978 | Film producer at Pixar | |
| George Wendt | Did not graduate | Actor best known as Norm from Cheers | |
| Jason Zimbler | 1998 | Actor best known as Ferguson Darling on Clarissa Explains It All | |

== Government and law ==
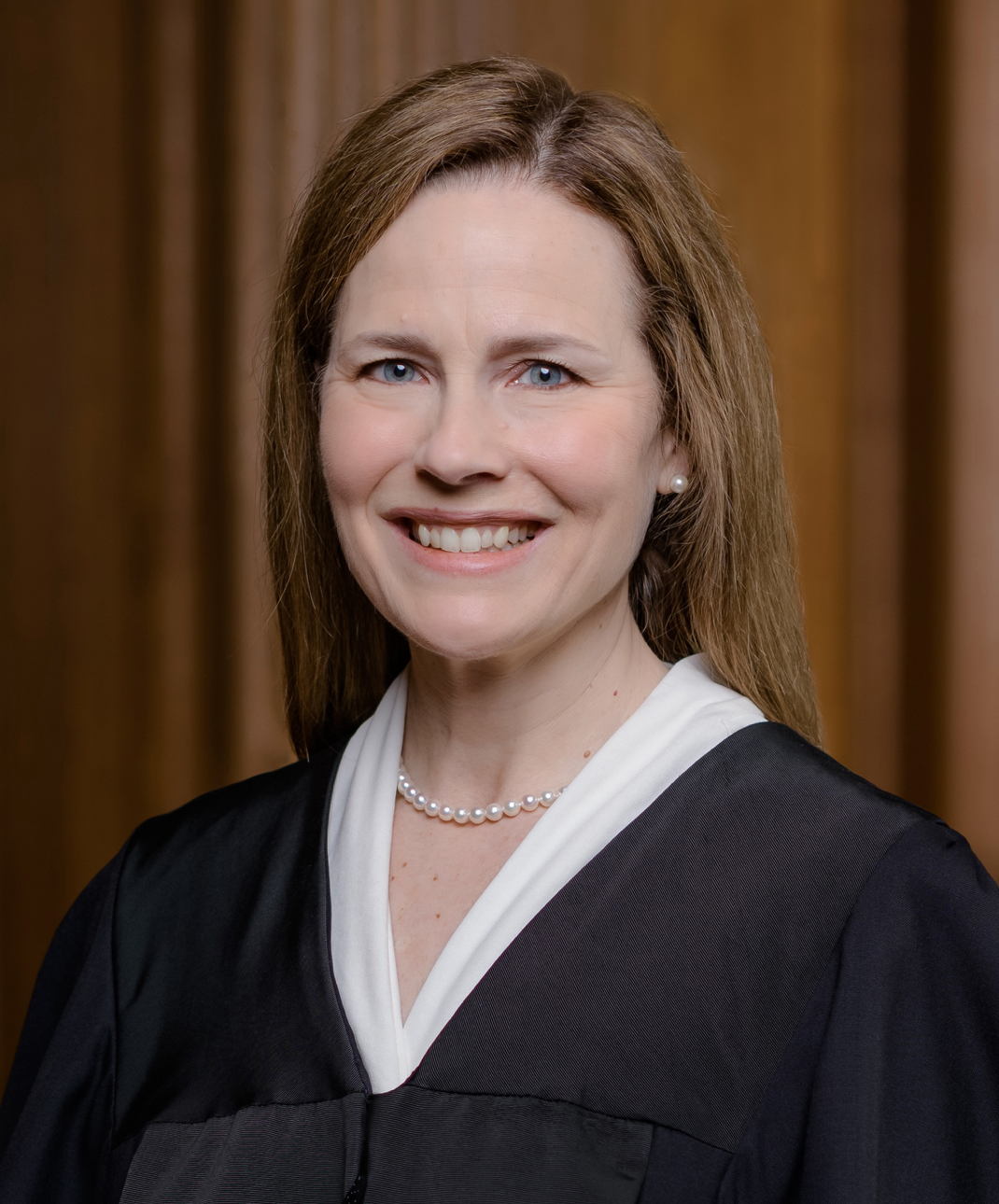
Amy Coney Barrett

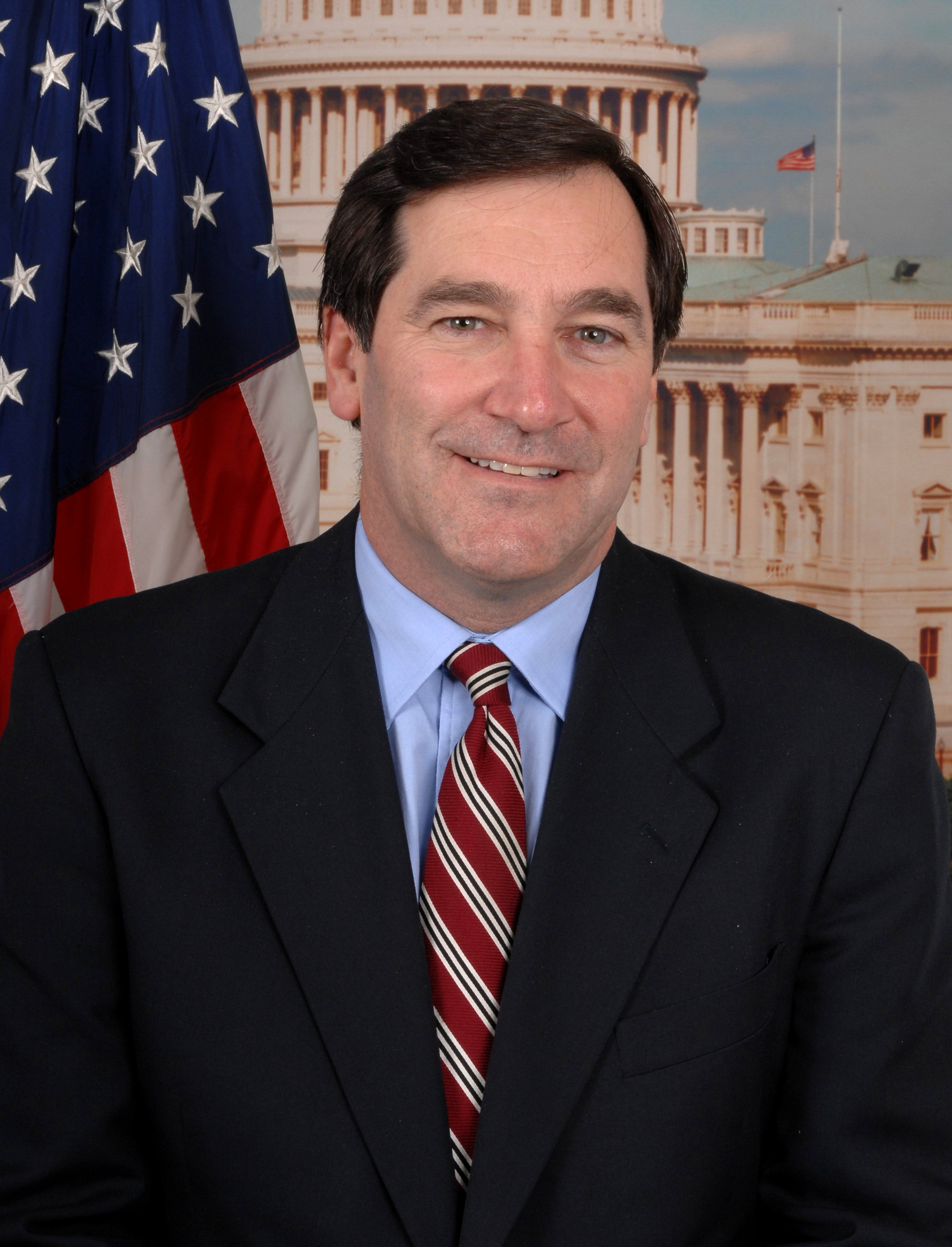
Joe Donnelly

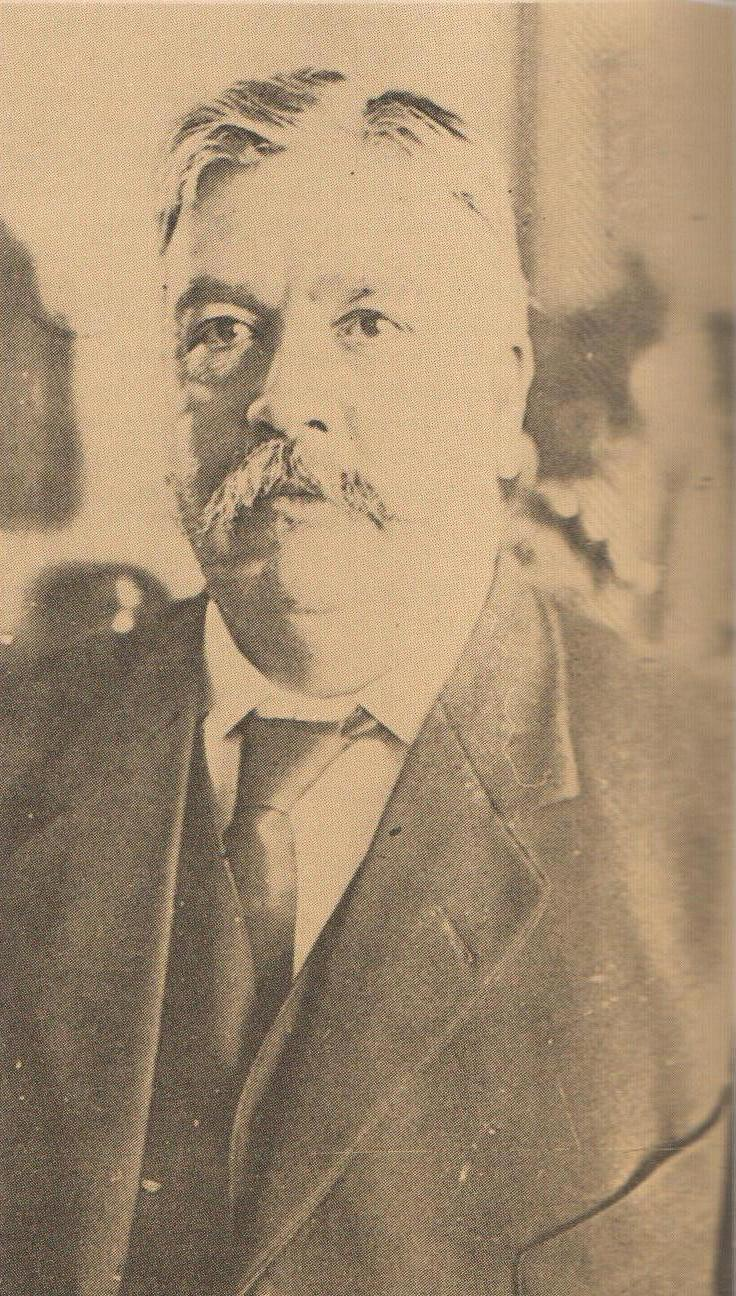
Abraham González

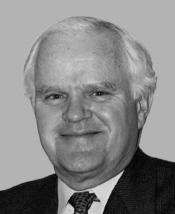
Joseph M. McDade

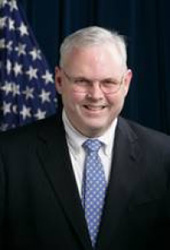
William McGurn

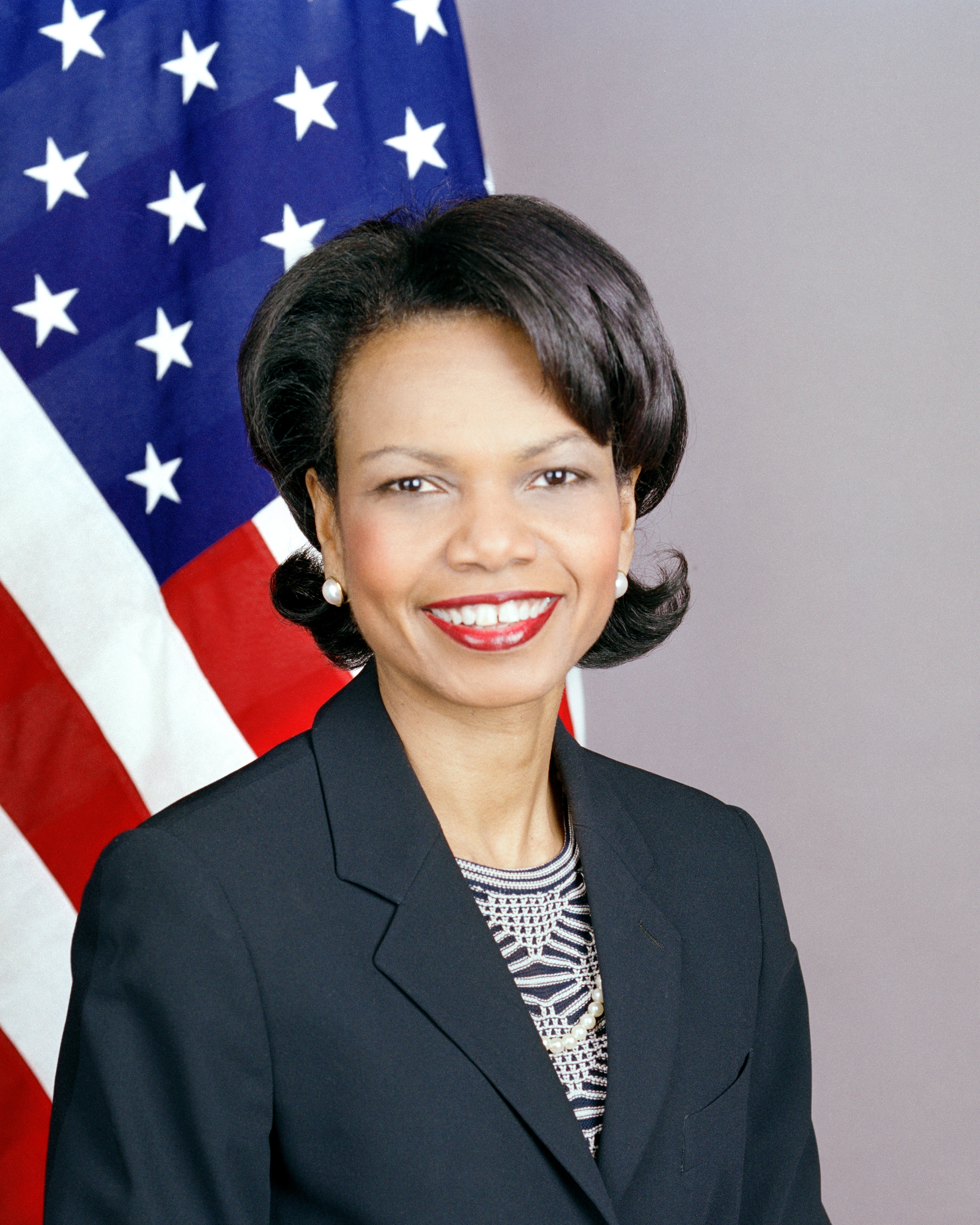
Condoleezza Rice

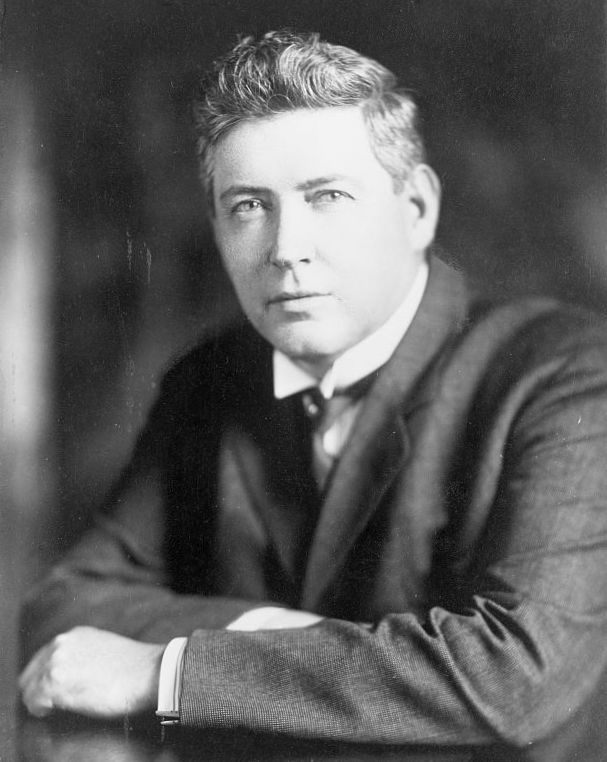
Nicholas J. Sinnott

=== Members of the United States Congress ===
| Name | Class year | Notability | Reference(s) |
|---|---|---|---|
| Vincente T. Blaz | 1951 | Delegate from Guam and Marine Corps Brigadier General | |
| Brendan F. Boyle | 1999 | Representative from Pennsylvania | |
| Edward P. Carville | 1909 | Senator from Nevada | |
| Jeffrey Chiesa | 1987 | Senator from New Jersey | |
| Warren Davidson | MBA | Representative from Ohio | |
| Joe Donnelly | 1977; JD. 1981 | Senator from Indiana | |
| Pat Fallon | c. 1990 | Member-elect for Texas's 4th congressional district; member of the Texas House of Representatives from Denton County, Texas (2013–2020); Notre Dame football player on 1988 championship team | |
| Mike Ferguson | 1992 | Representative from New Jersey | |
| Joseph M. Gaydos | 1951; LL.B | Representative from Pennsylvania | |
| William J. Granfield | 1913; JD | Representative from Massachusetts | |
| John Hall | Did not graduate | Representative from New York and former musician in Orleans | |
| Greg J. Holbrock | | Representative from Ohio and lawyer | |
| Jeff Hurd | 2001 | Representative from Colorado | |
| Mike Kelly | 1970 | Representative from Pennsylvania | |
| Peter T. King | 1968; JD. | Representative from New York | |
| Dan Lungren | 1968 | Representative from California and former Attorney General of California | |
| David O'Brien Martin | 1966 | Representative from New York | |
| Washington J. McCormick | Did not graduate | Representative from Montana | |
| Joseph M. McDade | 1953 | Representative from Pennsylvania | |
| William E. Miller | 1935 | Representative from New York and nominee for vice president in the 1964 U.S. presidential election | |
| John Ratcliffe | 1987 | Representative from Texas | |
| Timothy J. Roemer | 1979; PhD 1982 | Representative from Indiana, member of the National Commission on Terrorist Attacks upon the United States, past president of the Center for National Policy, current U.S. ambassador to the Republic of India | |
| Nicholas J. Sinnott | 1892 | Representative from Oregon | |
| Mark Souder | 1974, MBA | Representative from Indiana | |
| Pete Visclosky | 1973, JD. | Representative from Indiana | |
| Rudy Yakym | 2019, MBA | Representative from Indiana | |

=== United States governors ===
| Name | Class year | Notability | Reference(s) |
|---|---|---|---|
| William A. Allain | N/A | Former governor of Mississippi | |
| Bruce Babbitt | 1960 | Former governor of Arizona and United States Secretary of the Interior | |
| Edward P. Carville | 1909 | Former governor of Nevada | |
| John J. Gilligan | 1943 | Former governor of Ohio | |
| Thomas Lee Judge | 1957 | Former governor of Montana | |
| Harry Kelly | 1917 | Former governor of Michigan | |
| Joe Kernan | 1968 | Former governor of Indiana | |
| Bob McDonnell | 1976 | Former governor of Virginia | |
| John McKiernan | 1934 | Former governor of Rhode Island | |
| Pedro Rosselló | 1966 | Former governor of Puerto Rico | |

=== Ambassadors from the United States ===
| Name | Class year | Notability | Reference(s) |
|---|---|---|---|
| Carey Cavanaugh | 1978; MA | Former ambassador/special negotiator for conflicts in Eurasia; professor of conflict resolution at the University of Kentucky and director of the Patterson School of Diplomacy and International Commerce | |
| J. Gary Cooper | 1958 | Former ambassador to Jamaica | |
| James Creagan | 1962 | Former ambassador to Honduras | |
| Miguel Diaz | MA; PhD | Former ambassador to the Holy See | |
| Timothy J. Roemer | 1979; PhD 1982 | U.S. ambassador to the Republic of India; former U.S. Representative from Indiana; member of the National Commission on Terrorist Attacks upon the United States; past president of the Center for National Policy | |
| Mark Toner | 1986<BA | Former deputy spokesperson of the United States Department of State | |

=== Foreign political figures ===
| Name | Class year | Notability | Reference(s) |
|---|---|---|---|
| Ernesto Pérez Balladares | 1967; MA 1969 | Former president of Panama | |
| Elizabeth Azcona Bocock | MBA | Former Ministry of Industry and Commerce of Honduras | |
| Adolfo Calero | 1953 | Leader of the rebel Nicaraguan group Contras | |
| José Napoleón Duarte | 1948 | Former president of El Salvador | |
| Abraham González | | Governor of the Mexican state of Chihuahua during the Mexican Revolution | |
| Kamal Hossain | 1955 | Father of the Constitution of Bangladesh; served as Minister of Law; Minister of Petroleum and Minerals and Minister of Foreign Affairs of Bangladesh | |
| Jacqueline Perkins | | British ambassador to Belarus from August 2019 | |

=== Other U.S. political and legal figures ===
| Name | Class year | Notability | Reference(s) |
|---|---|---|---|
| Richard V. Allen | 1957; MA 1958 | Former United States National Security Advisor | |
| James L. Applegate | 1953 | Democratic member of the Wyoming House of Representatives | |
| James A. Baker | | Staff attorney in the United States Department of Justice | |
| Amy Coney Barrett | 1997; JD | Associate justice of the Supreme Court of the United States | |
| B. Patrick Bauer | 1966 | State representative (1970–2020), former speaker | |
| Taylor Benson | 1955 | Wisconsin state senator | |
| Brendan F. Boyle | 1999 | State representative, Pennsylvania (2009–2015) | |
| Jerry Brady | 1958 | Former Democratic candidate for governor of Idaho and newspaper owner | |
| Joseph Cari Jr. | 1974; JD 1978 | Lawyer, businessman, and public policy expert | |
| Jeffrey S. Chiesa | 1987; BA 1987 | New Jersey attorney general (2012–2013) | |
| Jenny Durkan | 1980 | United States attorney for the Western District of Washington (2009–2014) | |
| Ryan Dvorak | 1996 | Indiana state representative (2002–present) | |
| Charles H. Fahy | 1911 | Former solicitor general of the United States | |
| Sean Faircloth | 1982 | Maine state representative (1992–1994; 2002–2008), Maine state senator (1994–1996), executive director, Secular Coalition for America | |
| Peter F. Flaherty | 1951; JD | Former mayor of Pittsburgh and United States Deputy Attorney General | |
| Emilio M. Garza | 1969; MA 1970 | Judge on the United States Court of Appeals for the Fifth Circuit | |
| Leo Richard Hamilton | 1949 | Wisconsin state assemblyman (1987–1993) | |
| Thomas Hardiman | BA 1987 | Judge of the United States Court of Appeals for the Third Circuit (2007–present) | |
| Kevin Hasson | MA; JD 1985 | Lawyer and founder of religious law firm | |
| William J. Hochul, Jr. | 1981 | United States attorney for the Western District of New York (2010–2016) | |
| William Tell Johnson | | Lawyer, judge and politician | |
| Walter J. Kavanaugh | 1955 | Former New Jersey state senator (1997–2007), New Jersey state representative (1976–1997) | |
| Matthew F. Kennelly | 1978; Bachelor of Arts | District judge, United States District Court for the Northern District of Illinois (1999–present) | |
| John Kilkenny | 1925; LL.B. | Federal judge: 9th Cir. (1969–1971); D. Or. (1959–1969) | |
| Stanley Kusper | | Cook County clerk | |
| Frank LaGrotta | 1980; MA 1981 | Pennsylvania state representative (1987–2006) | |
| Edward Leavy | 1953; LL.B. | Federal judge: 9th Cir. (1987–1997); D. Or. (1984–1987) | |
| Robert E. Lynch | | Wisconsin state assemblyman (1933–1936; 1943–1958) | |
| Michael Madigan | | Illinois state representative (1971–present), speaker of the Illinois House of Representatives (1983–1995; 1997–present) and chairman of the Democratic Party of Illinois | |
| Mbuyiseli Madlanga | 1990; LL.B. | Judge of the Constitutional Court of South Africa; appointed on August 1, 2013 | |
| Eduardo Malapit | 1962; JD | Former mayor of Kauai, Hawaii, first Filipino American mayor in the United States | |
| Ralph McGehee | 1949 | Former officer for the Central Intelligence Agency who went on to be an outspoken critic of the Agency as the author of Deadly Deceits: My 25 Years in the CIA | |
| William McGurn | 1980 | President George W. Bush's chief speechwriter and chief editorial writer and member of The Wall Street Journal's editorial board | |
| C. E. McIntosh | | Wisconsin state assemblyman (1869–1871) | |
| Mallory McMorrow | 2008 | Michigan state senator | |
| Jerry Meek | | Lawyer and chairman of the North Carolina Democratic Party | |
| Joan Orie Melvin | 1978 | Former Pennsylvania Supreme Court justice, felon | |
| Robert Meza | 1986 | Arizona state senator (2011–present), Arizona state representative (2003–2011) | |
| Federico A. Moreno | 1974 | Chief federal judge of the Southern District of Florida | |
| Michael Murphy | 1979 | Indiana state representative (1994–2010) | |
| Ralph Neas | 1968 | Politician and former president of the People For the American Way | |
| Paul V. Niemeyer | 1966; JD | Federal judge: 4th Cir. (1990–present), D. Md. (1988–1990) | |
| Kevin J. O'Connor | 1989 | United States attorney from Connecticut | |
| Alan Page | 1967 | Associate justice of the Minnesota Supreme Court; member of the Pro Football Hall of Fame | |
| Louis P. Peck | 1950 (BA); 1951 (JD) | Associate justice of the Vermont Supreme Court | |
| Condoleezza Rice | 1975; MA | United States secretary of state and former National Security advisor | |
| Al Salvi | 1982 | Former member of the Illinois House of Representatives, US Senate Republican nominee and Illinois secretary of state Republican nominee; managing partner of Salvi & Maher, LLC | |
| John Sears | 1960 | Campaign manager for Ronald Reagan | |
| Matthew J. Slaughter | 1990 | Economist and former member of the Council of Economic Advisers | |
| Thomas W. Sneddon Jr. | 1963 | District attorney of Santa Barbara County, California | |
| George William Strake, Jr. | Bachelor of Arts 1957 | Secretary of state of Texas (1979–1981); Texas Republican state chairman, 1983–1988; Houston businessman and philanthropist | |
| John Suthers | 1974 | 41st mayor of Colorado Springs, 37th attorney general of Colorado | |
| Casper R. Taylor, Jr. | 1956 | Former speaker of the Maryland House of Delegates | |
| Mike Turzai | 1981 | Speaker of the Pennsylvania House Representatives, former Republican Caucus (majority) Leader | |
| Martha Vázquez | 1975 | United States federal judge for the United States District Court for the District of New Mexico | |
| Clair H. Voss | | Presiding judge of the Wisconsin Court of Appeals | |
| Steven T. Walther | 1965 | Vice-chairman of the Federal Election Commission | |
| Mike Wenstrup | | Chair of the Alaska Democratic Party | |
| Michael Whatley | 1997; J.D., M.A. | Chairman of the Republican National Committee | |
| Charles R. Wilson | 1976; JD 1979 | Judge in the United States Court of Appeals for the Eleventh Circuit | |
| Francis Parker Yockey | 1941; JD | Lawyer, political theorist, and author of Imperium: The Philosophy of History and Politics | |

== Journalists and media personalities ==
| Name | Class year | Notability | Reference(s) |
|---|---|---|---|
| Robert Costa | 2008 | Journalist for the Washington Post | |
| Erin Clarke | 2008 | Food blogger and cookbook author; founder of Well Plated by Erin | |
| Don Criqui | 1962 | Sportscaster for CBS, NBC | |
| George Dohrmann | 1995 | 2000 Pulitzer Prize winner for beat reporting, Sports Illustrated senior writer and author of Play Their Hearts Out | |
| Phil Donahue | 1957 | Talk show host and creator of The Phil Donahue Show | |
| David Freddoso | 1999 | Washington Examiner columnist and best-selling author of The Case Against Barack Obama | |
| John W. Gallivan | 1937 | Salt Lake Tribune publisher, 1960–1984 | |
| Mike Golic | 1985 | Radio host of ESPN's Mike and Mike in the Morning | |
| Bryan Gruley | 1979 | Shared a Pulitzer Prize for his coverage of the September 11 attacks with The Wall Street Journal | |
| William J. Guilfoile | 1954 | Public Relations director of the National Baseball Hall of Fame and Museum (1979–1996) | |
| Nikole Hannah-Jones | 1998 | Investigative journalist, MacArthur Fellow, and Pulitzer Prize winner for The 1619 Project | |
| Sunny Hostin | 1992; JD | Former prosecutor, legal analyst, co-host of The View | |
| Erika Kullberg | | Former corporate attorney, financial advisor, social media influencer | |
| Andrew Napolitano | 1975; JD | Correspondent for the Fox News Channel and former New Jersey Superior Court judge | |
| Jim Nelson | 1966 | Editor-in-chief of GQ Magazine | |
| Don Ohlmeyer | 1966 | Former television producer and president of the NBC network's west coast division | |
| Walter O'Keefe | 1921 | Songwriter, actor, syndicated columnist, Broadway composer, radio host, screenwriter, musical arranger, and TV host | |
| William Pfaff | 1949 | Long-time contributor to the International Herald Tribune and author of several books on current events and contemporary history | |
| Regis Philbin | 1953 | Television personality best known for hosting Live with Regis and Kelly and Who Wants to Be a Millionaire | |
| Ted Robinson | 1978 | Sportscaster best known for Olympics coverage | |
| Mark Shields | 1959 | Political columnist and commentator for CNN and The NewsHour with Jim Lehrer | |
| Red Smith | 1927 | Sportswriter for the New York Herald Tribune and New York Times, Pulitzer Prize winner | |
| Terence Smith | 1960 | Journalist and media correspondent for The NewsHour with Jim Lehrer | |
| Gaby Spartz | 2009 | Twitch streamer and YouTube gamer | |
| Matthew V. Storin | 1964 | Former editor of the Boston Globe and Chicago Sun-Times; former Managing Editor of the New York Daily News; former reporter at the U.S. News & World Report | |
| Hannah Storm | 1983 | ESPN sportscaster and co-host of CBS's The Early Show | |
| Kate Sullivan | 1998 | Television news presenter | |
| Anne Thompson | 1979 | Correspondent for NBC News | |
| Kenneth L. Woodward | 1957 | Religion editor for Newsweek | |

== Literature and writing ==
| Name | Class year | Notability | Reference(s) |
|---|---|---|---|
| John Bellairs | 1959 | Gothic novelist best known for work in the horror and mystery genres | |
| John Dearie | 1986 | Author and vice president of Policy and Research at the Financial Services Forum | |
| Kevin Guilfoile | 1990 | Author of the novel Cast of Shadows | |
| Tess Gunty | 2015 | Author of the 2022 National Book Award for Fiction winning novel The Rabbit Hutch | |
| Samuel John Hazo | 1949 | Author; poet; first Poet Laureate of Pennsylvania; an annual award in his name for student poetry is presented at Commencement | |
| Angela Hur | 2005 MFA | Author; Sparks Prize recipient | |
| James Patrick Kelly | 1972 | Author best known for work in science fiction and two-time winner of the Hugo Award | |
| Evan Kuhlman | 1990 | Children's author | |
| Barry Lopez | 1966; MAT 1968 | Essayist, poet, and fiction writer | |
| Bob McKenty | 1956 | Poet | |
| Edwin O'Connor | 1939 | Author and Pulitzer Prize winner for the novel The Last Hurrah | |
| James Reese | | Author of gothic novels | |
| Nicholas Sparks | 1988 | Author best known for novels A Walk to Remember and The Notebook | |
| Harry Sylvester | 1930 | Novelist and short story writer, best known for his novels Dayspring and Moon Gaffney | |

== Military ==
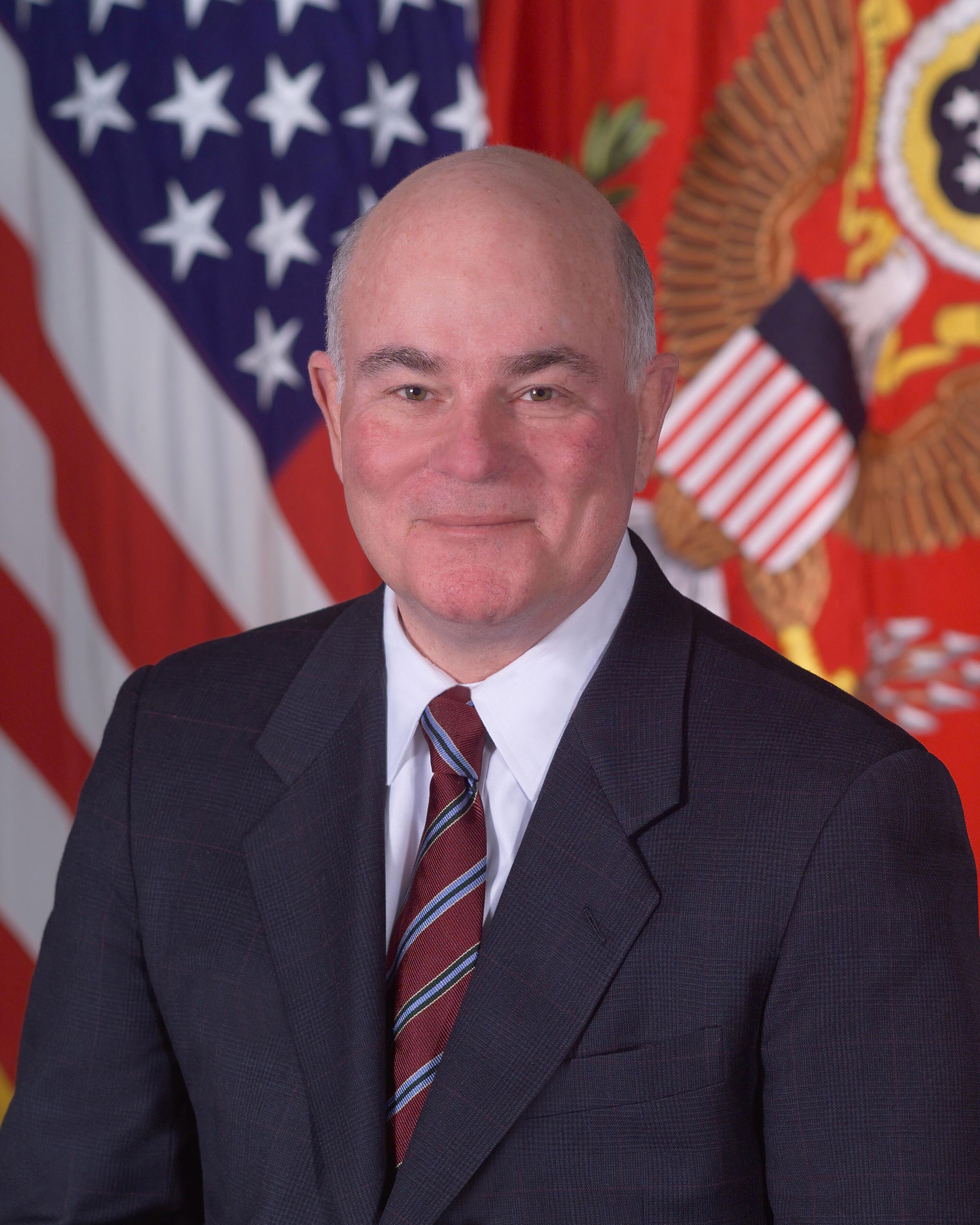
Francis J. Harvey

| Name | Class year | Notability | Reference(s) |
|---|---|---|---|
| Joseph A. Ahearn | 1958 | Air Force Major general and former civil engineer of the Air Force | |
| Mark W. Balmert | | Naval rear admiral commander of the joint Navy and Marine Corps Expeditionary Strike Group Three | |
| Vincente T. Blaz | 1951 | Marine Corps brigadier general; former deputy chief of staff for Reserve Affairs | |
| Michael H. Decker | 1980 | Director of Marine Corps Intelligence (2004–2005), Assistant to the Secretary of Defense for Intelligence Oversight (2009–2014) | |
| Daniel L. Gard | MA 1988; PhD 1992 | Naval rear admiral and deputy chief of chaplains for Reserve Matters | |
| Francis J. Harvey | 1965 | Former United States secretary of the Army | |
| John Henebry | 1940 | General in the United States Air Force | |
| Donald Rice | 1961 | Former United States Secretary of the Air Force | |
| Charles E. Tucker, Jr. | 1979 | Retired major general in the United States Air Force | |
| Christopher W. Grady | 1984 | Former Vice Chairman of the Joint Chiefs of Staff | |

== NASA crew members ==
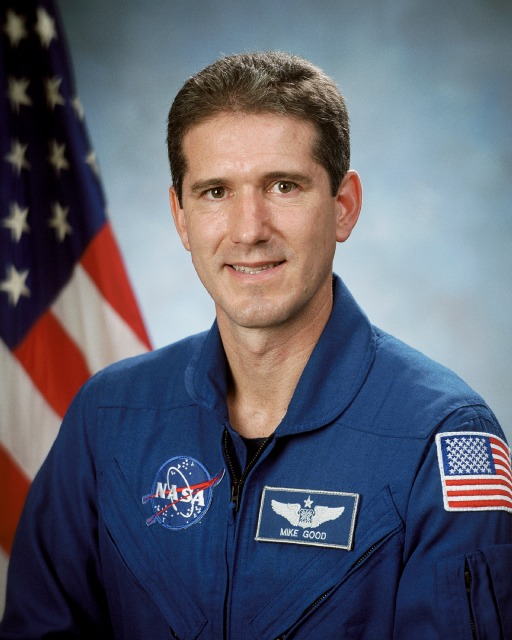
Michael T. Good

| Name | Class year | Notability | Reference(s) |
|---|---|---|---|
| Kevin A. Ford | 1982 | NASA astronaut | |
| Michael T. Good | 1984; MS 1986 | NASA astronaut | |
| Annette Hasbrook | 1985 | Former flight director of Johnson Space Center | |
| Thomas McMurtry | 1957 | Former test pilot, chief engineer and director for Flight Operations at NASA's Flight Research Center | |
| Dava Newman | 1986 | Deputy Administrator of NASA | |
| Jim Wetherbee | 1974 | Former astronaut and deputy director of Lyndon B. Johnson Space Center | |

== Religion ==
| Name | Class year | Notability | Reference(s) |
|---|---|---|---|
| William Donald Borders | 1947 | Former archbishop of Baltimore, Maryland | |
| Joan Chittister | 1968; MA | Nun, social activism lecturer, and columnist | |
| Kelvin Felix | 1969 MA | Archbishop emeritus of Castris, cardinal | |
| Ben Fischer | 2008 PhD | Bishop suffragan of the Anglican Diocese of the Rocky Mountains | |
| Kilian Caspar Flasch | | Bishop of the Diocese of La Crosse, Wisconsin | |
| Timothy Galvin | 1916 | Deputy Supreme Knight of the Knights of Columbus, president of the Notre Dame Alumni Association | |
| Theotonius Amal Ganguly | 1949 MA; 1951 Ph.D. | Archbishop of the Roman Catholic Archdiocese of Dhaka | |
| Jeffery D. Long | 1991 BA | Noted Hindu expert and author of A Vision for Hinduism: Beyond Hindu Nationalism | |
| John Francis Cardinal O'Hara | 1911 | Cardinal, archbishop of Philadelphia, president of Notre Dame (1943–1945) | |
| Kevin Ranaghan | PhD | Religious scholar | |
| William Albert Wack, C.S.C. | 1989 BA; 1993 Mdiv | American Roman Catholic prelate, bishop of the Diocese of Pensacola–Tallahassee | |

== Sports ==
Although Notre Dame is highly ranked academically, it is also strong in athletics, producing a large number of athletes. Over 400 students have gone on to play professional American football in the National Football League, American Football League, or the All-America Football Conference, including recent graduates, like Brady Quinn and Pro Football Hall of Famers like Joe Montana. Additionally, Notre Dame had had 47 former students inducted into the College Football Hall of Fame, including football pioneer Knute Rockne. In addition to football, Notre Dame has had a number of athletes go professional in other sports, such as Women's National Basketball Association stars Skylar Diggins, Sonia Citron and National Baseball Hall of Famer Carl Yastrzemski. Notre Dame has also produced a number of Olympians, including fencing medalists Mariel Zagunis and Nick Itkin.

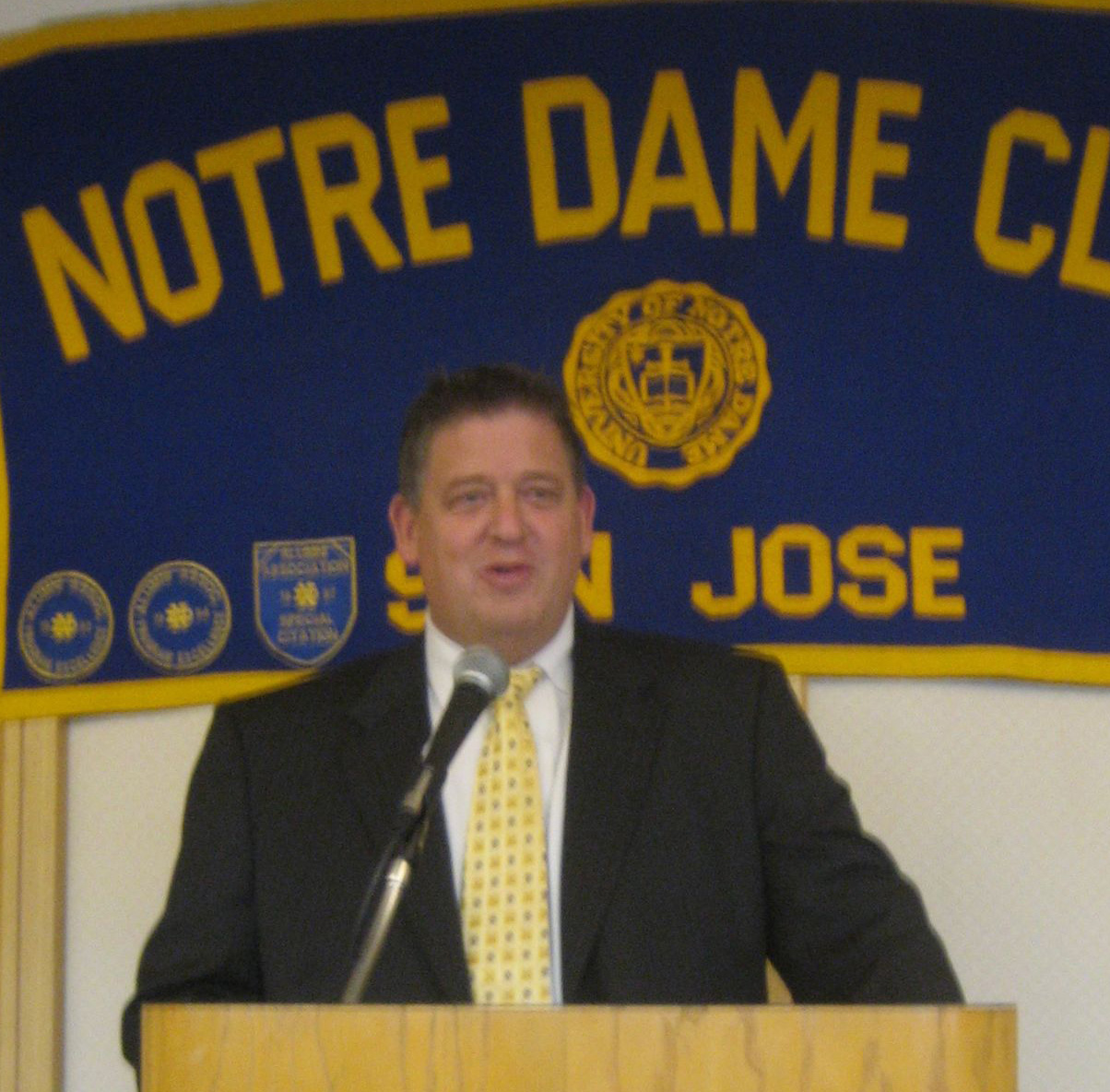
Charlie Weis

=== Coaches and executives ===
| Name | Class year | Notability | Reference(s) |
|---|---|---|---|
| Dutch Bergman | | Football coach for New Mexico A&M, Dayton, Minnesota, Catholic University of America, and the Washington Redskins | |
| Pete Bevacqua | 1993 | Chairman, NBC Sports Group | |
| Dick Coury | 1951 | Football coach for Cal State Fullerton Titans, USC Trojans, Denver Broncos, Houston Oilers, Los Angeles Rams, Minnesota Vikings, New England Patriots, Philadelphia Eagles, San Diego Chargers, and Portland Storm | |
| Mike Girsch | | General manager for the St. Louis Cardinals | |
| Mike Haywood | 1986 | Football coach for Miami (OH), Notre Dame, Texas, LSU, Ball State, Ohio, Army, and Minnesota | |
| Frank Leahy | 1931 | Football coach for Georgetown University, Michigan State, Fordham University, Boston College, Notre Dame | |
| Knute Rockne | 1914 | Three-time National Championship-winning coach for Notre Dame | |
| Charlie Weis | 1978 | Football coach for the University of Florida, Notre Dame, Kansas City Chiefs, New England Patriots, New York Jets, and New York Giants | |

== Other ==
| Name | Class year | Notability | Reference(s) |
|---|---|---|---|
| Steve Bartman | 1999 | Fan who interfered with a foul ball in the 2003 National League Championship Series | |
| Thomas Anthony Dooley III | 1944 | Physician, humanitarian, and anti-Communism activist | |
| Marc Maurer | 1974 | President of the National Federation of the Blind | |
| Vincent Meli | 1944 | Mobster | |
| Hubert Schlafly | 1941 | Designed and patented the teleprompter | |
| Thomas Schuler | | Spinal surgeon | |

=== Fictional ===
| Name | Class year | Notability | Reference(s) |
|---|---|---|---|
| Eamon Bailey | | One of the Three Wise Men in the novel The Circle by Dave Eggers | |
| Josiah Bartlet | | President of the United States in The West Wing | |
| Abbey Bartlet | | First Lady of the United States in The West Wing | |
| Danny Concannon | | Member of the White House press corps on The West Wing | |
| Sean Donahue | | Character from The Middle | |
| Paul Lassiter | | Press secretary on Spin City | |
| Li'l Sebastian | | Miniature horse with honorary Notre Dame degree on Parks and Recreation | |
| Edward Montgomery | | Greg's father on Dharma & Greg | |
| Lt. Walter J. "Touchdown" Schinoski | | Claims to have played football at Notre Dame in Stanley Kubrick's Full Metal Jacket | |
| John Smith | | Professional spy, or hitman, in Mr. & Mrs. Smith portrayed by Brad Pitt | |
| William Walden | | Vice president on Homeland | |
| Sean Rilley | | FBI agent assigned to a case involving a violent museum attack in The Last Templar by Raymond Khoury | |
