= Alex Jones (disambiguation) =

Alex Jones (born 1974) is an American radio host, conspiracy theorist, filmmaker, and author.

Alex Jones may also refer to:

- Alex Jones (actor), American actor and advocate for the deaf
- Alex Jones, Australian hip-hop artist, member of the group Lgeez
- Alex Jones (baseball) (1869–1941), American Major League Baseball pitcher, 1889–1903
- Alex Jones (basketball) (born 1987), American basketball player
- Alex Jones (cricketer) (born 1988), Welsh cricketer
- Alex Jones (footballer, born 1964), English football defender active in the 1980s and 1990s
- Alex Jones (footballer, born 1994), English football forward
- Alex S. Jones (born 1946), American journalist
- Alex Jones (playwright), British actor, playwright and filmmaker
- Alex Jones (preacher) (1941–2017), African-American Roman Catholic deacon and preacher
- Alex Jones (racing driver) (1988–2019), Welsh racing driver
- Alex Jones (rugby league) (born 1993), Welsh rugby league player
- Alex Jones (Welsh presenter) (born 1977), Welsh television presenter
- Alex Jones (business executive), CEO of Hallow

== See also ==
- Alexandra Jones (disambiguation)
- Alexander Jones (disambiguation)
- Alec Jones (1924–1983), British Labour Party politician
- Alex Davies-Jones (born 1989), British Labour party politician
- Alex Johns (1966–2010), American film and television producer
- Jones (surname)
