= Berges =

Berges may refer to:

== People ==
- Alexandre Bergès (born 1868, date of death unknown), French fencer
- Consuelo Berges (1899–1988), Spanish translator, journalist, writer, and biographer
- David Berges, British businessman
- Eugène Bergès, French fencer
- Friedel Berges (1903–1969), German swimmer
- Hélène Bergès (born 1966), French scientist
- James Berges, American businessman
- José Berges (1820–1868), Paraguayan diplomat
- Laurenz Berges (born 1966), German photographer
- Melani Bergés Gámez (born 1990), Spanish paralympic athlete
- Paul Mayeda Berges (born 1968), American screenwriter and director
- Pedro Bergés (1906–1978), Cuban football player
- Rafael Berges (born 1971), Spanish football player
- Sandrine Bergès (born 1970), French philosopher
- Stéphane Bergès (born 1975), French cyclist
- Àstrid Bergès-Frisbey (born 1986), French-Spanish actress and model
- Émilien-Benoît Bergès (born 1983), French road racing cyclist

== Places ==
- Berges du Lac, Tunisia
- Berges du Rhône, France
