= MLIA =

MLIA may refer to:

- MyLifeIsAverage, a humor web site
- Maxillary lateral incisor agenesis
