= Spartz =

Spartz is a surname. Notable people with the surname include:

- Emerson Spartz (born 1987), American businessman
- Gaby Spartz (born 1987), Ecuadorian Twitch streamer and YouTube gamer
- Léon Spartz (1927–1997), Luxembourgian footballer
- Victoria Spartz (born 1978), American politician
