= Texts From Last Night =

Defunct blog featuring user-submitted text messages

- Website type: Blog (user-generated)
- Revenue: Advertising
- Website: Texts From Last Night
- Commercial: Yes
- Registration: No
- Launched: February 2009
- Current status: Active

Texts From Last Night (TFLN) is a no-longer-maintained blog that used to re-post short text messages submitted by its users, originally formed as a sorority email chain by creator Lauren Leto. The site tends to post texts that are shocking or scandalous.

The texts are sent in by people who wake in the morning "to find regrettable messages sent to or from their mobile phones". The receiver then sends the allegedly discovered text into this website. The copies of the messages do not show the phone numbers, but only area codes. Since the texts are often similar to late night drunk dials, they're often graphic and sexual in nature, thus not safe for work.

From a sociological perspective, the website is a "living document of twentysomething life in 2009". While TFLN has many "blackout drinking, sex, and vomit stories", there is also an extended discussion taking place about morality. The texts show how humans "interact with drugs and alcohol". "We see the cause and effect of last night’s party, and we can see a real-time weighing of these actions." However, there is concern that peoples' actions and texts will be affected by the existence of the website and its popularity.

== Book ==
Six months after the website went up, the blog's creators – Leto Ben Bator – signed a deal with Gotham Books (part of Penguin Group) to publish a trade paperback of existing content from the blog, which was released as Texts from Last Night: All the Texts No One Remembers Sending in 2010.

== TV series ==
Deadline Hollywood reported, in October 2011, that a new comedy television series based on the blog was in development at Fox, with Ugly Betty developer Silvio Horta at the helm. This was the third attempt at developing a comedy based on the website; along with FOX, Happy Madison and Sony TV attempted to develop the comedy in 2009 (with a script from Steve Holland), and in 2010 (Marc Abrams and Michael Benson). However, none of the scripts ever produced pilots that made it to air.

== Mobile apps ==
Texts From Last Night also has mobile applications for Android, BlackBerry and iPhone to browse and submit text messages.

== See also ==
- Sexting
- FMyLife
- MyLifeIsAverage
- GivesMeHope
