= Alexandra Jones =

Alexandra Jones may refer to:

- Alexandra Jones (archaeologist), American archaeologist
- Alexandra (Nikita character), alias Alexandra Jones
- C. Alexandra Jones, character played by J. A. Steel
- Alexandra Jones; see HALO 8 Entertainment

== See also ==
- Alex Jones (disambiguation)
