= Emily J. Nelson =

American NASA flight director

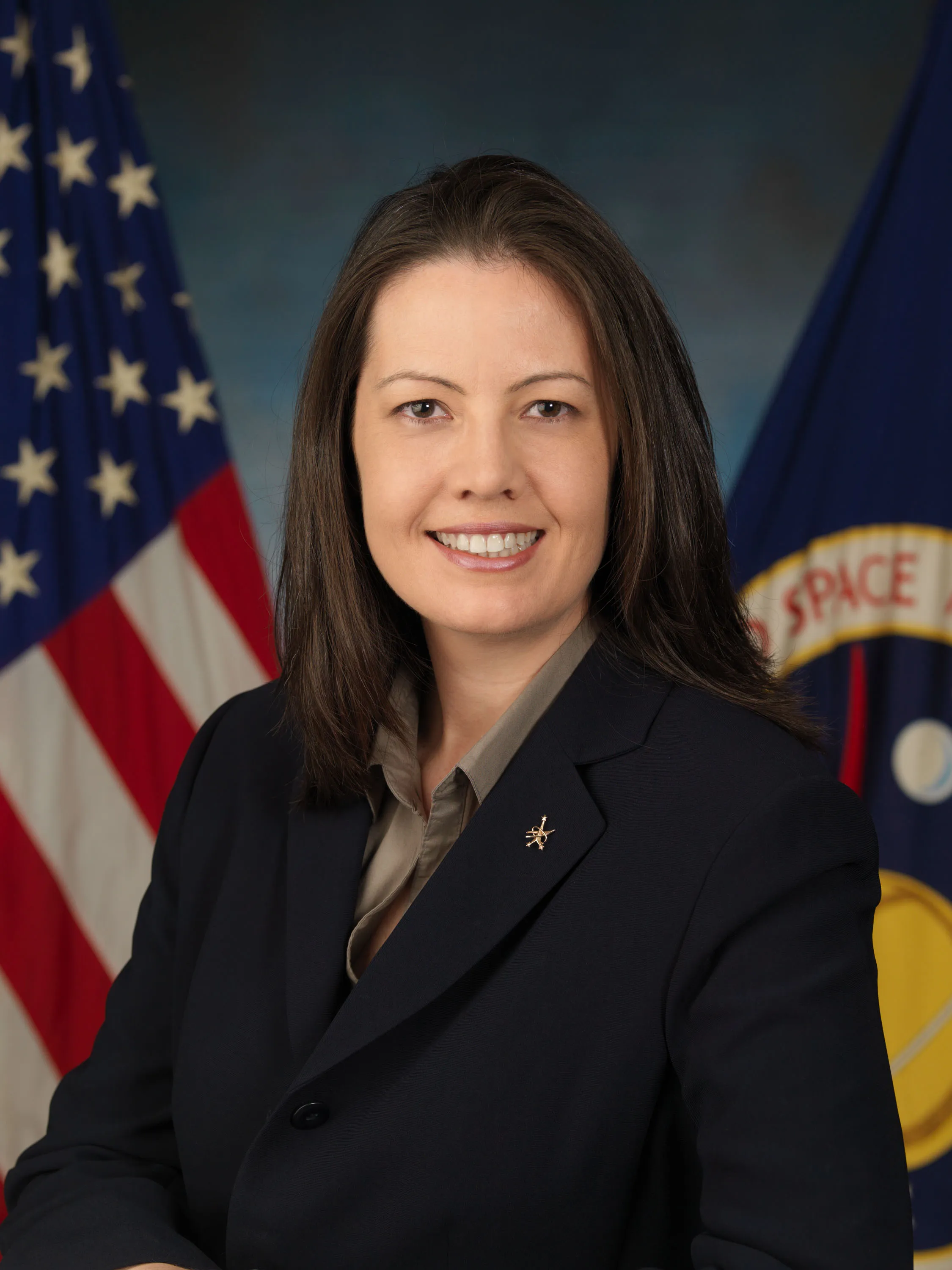
- NFM 2019: 11th Annual NASA Formal Methods Symposium
- Born: Okinawa, Japan
- Education: B.S. in Mechanical Engineering
- Alma mater: University of Texas at Austin
- Occupations: Aerospace engineer; flight director
- Employer: NASA
- Known for: NASA chief flight director for human spaceflight operations
- Title: Chief of the Flight Director Office, NASA Johnson Space Center
- Awards: NASA Outstanding Leadership Medal NASA Exceptional Service Medal NASA Exceptional Achievement Medal

Emily J. Nelson is an American aerospace engineer and NASA flight director. In 2023, NASA named Nelson chief flight director, leading the group responsible for directing human spaceflight missions from the Christopher C. Kraft Jr. Mission Control Center at the Johnson Space Center in Houston, Texas. She was selected as a NASA flight director in 2007, becoming the 70th flight director in NASA history and the 10th woman selected for the role.

== Early life and education ==
Nelson was born in Okinawa, Japan, and raised in Austin, Texas. She graduated from the Science, Math and Computer Academy at L.B.J. High School and attended the University of Texas at Austin, where she initially planned to study mathematics and later spent several semesters as a music major before moving into mechanical engineering. She earned a Bachelor of Science in Mechanical Engineering from the University of Texas at Austin in 1998.

== Career ==
Nelson began working at NASA's Johnson Space Center in September 1998 as an employee of United Space Alliance, serving as an International Space Station (ISS) Thermal Operations and Resources (ThOR) flight controller. In that role, she supported early space station assembly missions and ISS expeditions as part of the ThOR flight-control team. Nelson was hired by NASA in 2004 and continued supporting ISS operations while also working on information architecture for the Constellation program.

In May 2007, Nelson was selected as a NASA flight director and began regular support of ISS operations later that year. Her work as flight-director including the station's fourth utilization and logistics flight with Space Shuttle Atlantis in 2010, spacewalks to repair the Alpha Magnetic Spectrometer, and five long-duration ISS expeditions. Nelson chose the team name "Peridot Flight"; saying the name referred to peridot's occurrence in meteorites.

Nelson served as deputy chief of the Flight Director Office for five years beginning in 2017. While serving under Holly Ridings, the two formed NASA's first all-female Chief Flight Director team.

NASA named Nelson chief flight director on May 2, 2023, succeeding Ridings, who had held the position from 2018 to 2022 and moved to NASA's Gateway Program. NASA said Nelson had served as acting chief flight director after Ridings' departure. As chief, Nelson manages flight directors and flight directors-in-training who oversee missions involving the ISS, commercial crew spacecraft, and Artemis missions to the Moon.

In 2025 NASA's flight directors adopted a new flight director jacket. Nelson said the jacket was intended to help make flight directors more recognizable and to improve public understanding of mission-control work.

== Honors and awards ==
Nelson has received the NASA Outstanding Leadership Medal, Exceptional Service Medal, and Exceptional Achievement Medal. In 2019, the Walker Department of Mechanical Engineering at the University of Texas at Austin recognized her as a Distinguished Mechanical Engineer.
