= Annette Hasbrook =

Flight director (born 1964)

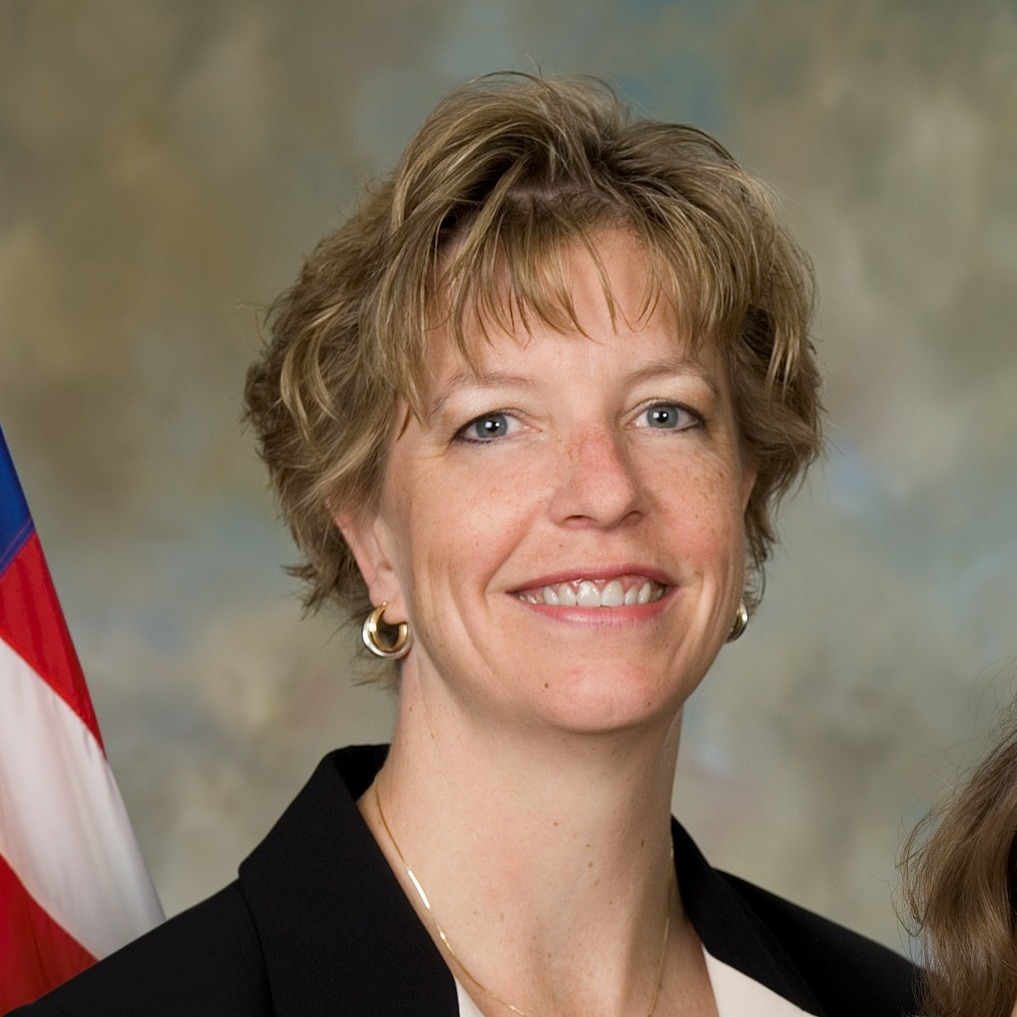
- Education: University of Notre Dame
- Scientific career
- Workplaces: NASA; Johnson Space Center

Annette Hasbrook was born on September 21, 1964, in Abadan, Iran. She is a retired NASA flight director and former assistant manager for integration on the Orion Program. Hasbrook was a pioneer in her field being one of the only women ever chosen to be a flight director for NASA. She received many promotions throughout her career, culminating with training the next generation of flight directors and payload officers. Additionally, Hasbrook was awarded a few medals and honors for her contributions to NASA.

== Education ==
Hasbrook received her Bachelor of Science in Mechanical Engineering from the University of Notre Dame in Notre Dame, Indiana. She began her studies in 1981 and was part of the 1985 graduating class.

Hasbrook applied to be a flight director at NASA and was accepted into the class of 2000 along with Cathy Koerner, as one of only five women ever to be flight directors in American Space Program history.

== Career ==
Annette Hasbrook began her career at NASA in July 1987 as a Payload Officer. She flew twelve flights as a payload officer with the call sign PAYLOADS. Hasbrook also flew one flight under the call sign ACO as the Assembly and Checkout Officer. Additionally, she operated as Ops Lead for two flights. Her time as a Payload Officer ended in May 2000 to switch to another position full time.

Annette Hasbrook developed an interest in space travel during her studies at the University of Notre Dame, graduating with a Bachelor of Science in Mechanical Engineering in 1985. Her 30-year career at NASA included overcoming challenges as one of the first women to serve as a flight director, a role that required superior technical skills and leadership ability. Among her notable achievements was serving as the lead flight director for STS-124, a key mission for the assembly of the International Space Station.

Starting in June 1997, Hasbrook began working as Group Lead for the Cargo Support Engineering Section of the Cargo Operations Branch. In this position, Hasbrook oversaw shuttle payload flights from start to finish. This includes supervising engineers while they complete preflight preparations, and payload executions in the moment, helping with ISS assembly, and managing checkout operations. Hasbrook left this post in October 2000 when she was chosen to be a flight director.

She was a flight director at the NASA Johnson Space Center in Houston, Texas, from 2000 to 2009. During her time there, Hasbrook advised on a food storage situation above the International Space Station in 2004. Hasbrook worked with the Space Shuttle Discovery, and the Space Shuttle Endeavour. She was also NASA's lead flight director for Expedition 10.

Hasbrook was assistant manager of NASA's Orion Program where she worked until 2009. She was also part of the STS-117 mission, as ISS Orbit 1, where she worked with Kelly Beck (ISS Orbit 2) and Holly Ridings as ISS Orbit 3.

In May 2008, Hasbrook received a promotion in the form of Deputy Chief of the Flight Director Office. This promotion allowed for leadership and direction for preflight protocols and mission execution. Hasbrook's time in this position was short as in December 2009 she again was promoted and moved to a different office in January of the next year.

In 2010, Hasbrook became Chief of the Space Flight Training Management office where she worked until May 2016. During this time, she operated as a supervisor for the planning and execution of training all within the Space Flight program. This includes crew, instructors, and flight controllers. Hasbrook was also in charge of creating training requirements and standards that students must meet.

Hasbrook retired from NASA in April 2023 and continues to live in Houston, Texas.

== Awards and honors ==
Annette Hasbrook won in 2005 a NASA Outstanding Leadership Medal for her abilities in developing the programs that NASA provided to her. During her years of being in NASA, she won the Exceptional Service Medal for her advancing progress in missions, and her way of solving them. She won a Silver Snoopy for her outstanding way of fixing problems just like in the MDF mission she commanded.

== See also ==
- Holly Ridings
- Orion program
- NASA
- Johnson Space Center
- List of University of Notre Dame alumni
