= Thomas Schuler =

American spinal surgeon (born 1960)

Thomas Schuler, M.D., F.A.C.S is an American spinal surgeon, researcher and educator in the treatment of neck and low back conditions. He was an early adopter of stem cell therapy, biologics, robotics, laser and hybrid surgery and augmented reality for spinal surgery. Schuler specializes in cervical and lumbar disc replacement procedures, minimally invasive spine surgery and robotic spine surgery. He performed the first hybrid multi-level cervical artificial disc replacement with spinal fusion in the country. He founded a practice that has performed some of the first robotic and augmented reality spinal surgeries in the world. In 2002 he created and currently serves as President of the National Spine Health Foundation, a national non-profit focused on education, research and patient advocacy of neck and back health.

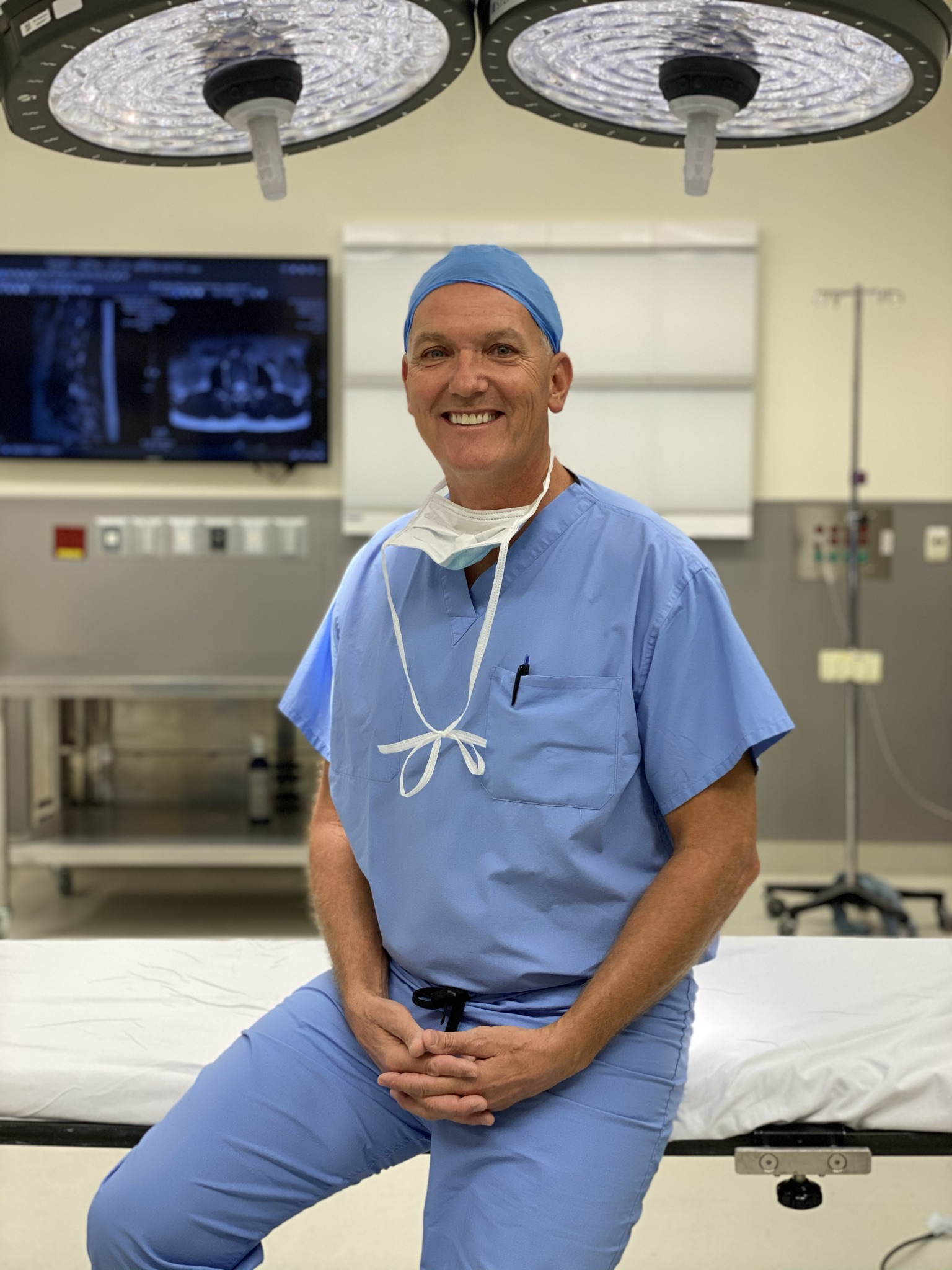
Thomas Schuler in the OR, Reston, Virginia

== Early life ==
Thomas Schuler was born in 1960. He became an [[

- Eagle

Scout (Boy Scouts of America)|Eagle Scout]] in 1977, went to college at the University of Notre Dame, and attended medical school at Indiana University School of Medicine. He completed his residency in Orthopaedic Surgery at Beaumont Hospital, Royal Oak and did his fellowship in spinal surgery at Kerlan - Jobe Orthopaedic Clinic in Los Angeles, California.[9]

== Career ==
Dr. Schuler is Double board certified and a Diplomat in spine surgery and orthopedic surgery of the spine. In 1998, he was one of the first doctors to use biologics in surgery when the practice he founded in 1992, The Virginia Spine Institute (VSI) in Reston, Virginia, served as the 3rd largest site in the nation for the trial of bone morphogenetic protein (BMP) – the first use of biologics in surgery.

Since 1998, Schuler speaks and teaches about spine surgery globally. He performed the first hybrid multi-level cervical artificial disc replacement with spinal fusion in the country. He leads a team of surgeons at VSI who performed the first robot-guided spine surgery in the Mid-Atlantic region, were the first in the world to perform Open Robotic Sacroiliac joint fusion and the first in Washington, D.C., and Virginia to perform Augmented Reality spinal surgery.

In 1993, Schuler became the spine consultant to the Washington Football Team (formerly known as The Washington Redskins) and served in that role for 22 seasons. He continues to treat professional athletes. Schuler has authored and co-authored numerous research papers about the spine in areas such as Discogenic Lumbar Disease, the minimum clinically important difference in lumbar spine surgery patients and six-year outcomes of anterior lumbar interbody arthrodesis. A frequent lecturer, presenter, and educator, Schuler has been named among the 100 Best Spine Surgeons and Specialists in America. He has been a member of the Board of Trustees of HCA Reston Hospital Center since 2018.

In 2002 he founded the National Spine Health Foundation. In addition to its education and advocacy work, the foundation designates spine "Centers of Excellence" across the U.S. Schuler has been President of the Foundation since 2004 and is also Chairman of the group's Medical and Scientific Board.

== Awards ==
In 2026, Schuler received the NESA Outstanding Eagle Scout Award (NOESA) from the National Eagle Scout Association, which recognizes Eagle Scouts for distinguished achievement in their careers and community service.

== Publications ==
- Burkus, JK; Gornett, MF; Dryer, RF; Schuler, TC; Peloza, JH (April 2011). "Consistent Clinical Outcomes in Treatment of Degenerative Lumbar Disc Disease by Using Stand Alone Anterior Lumbar Interbody Fusion Cages and Recombinant Human Bone Morphogenetic Protein-2: as an Investigational Treatment and as a Control Therapy in the Investigational Device Exemption". Spine.
- Subach, BR; Schuler, TC; McLaughlin, MR; Slosar, PJ; Comey, CH; Thomas, NM (3 December 2012). "Discogenic Lumbar Disease". Advances in Orthopedics. 2012 351714. doi:10.1155/2012/351714. PMC 3518956. PMID 23243514.
- Good, CR; Auerback, JD; O'Leary, PT; Schuler, TC (4 December 2011). "Adult Spinal Deformity". Current Review in Musculoskeletal Medicine. 4 (4): 159–67. doi:10.1007/s12178-011-9101-z. PMC 3261243. PMID 22021017.
- Anandakumar, S; te Choue, PC; Dhindsa, RK; Martin, MM; Copay, AG; Subach, BR; Schuler, TC; Bilgen, M; Orak, JK; Singh, I (19 April 2010). "Simvastatin protects bladder and renal functions following spinal cord injury in rats". Journal of Inflammation.
- Subach, BR; Copay, AG; Schuler, TC; Martin, MM. Fundamentals of Operative Techniques in Neurosurgery (2d edition), Lumbar Arthroplasty. pp. 510–515.
- Copay, AG; Martin, MM; Subach, BR; Glassman, SD; Carreon, LY; Berven, S; Schuler, TC (April 2010). "Assessment of spine surgery outcomes: Inconsistency of change amongst outcome measurements". The Spine Journal. 10 (4): 291–296. doi:10.1016/j.spinee.2009.12.027. PMID 20171937.
- Burkus, JK; Gornett, MF; Schuler, TC; Kleeman, TJ; Zdeblick, TA (May 2009). "Six-Year Outcomes of Anterior Lumbar Interbody Arthrodesis with Use of Interbody Fusion Cages and recombinant Human Bone Morphogenetic Protein-2". The Journal of Bone and Joint Surgery, American Volume. 91 (5): 1181–9. doi:10.2106/JBJS.G.01485. PMID 19411467.
- Copay, AG; Glassman, SD; Subach, BR; Berven, S; Schuler, TC; Carreon, LY (16 January 2008). "The Minimum Clinically Important Difference In Lumbar Spine Surgery Patients. A Choice of Methods Using The Oswestry Disability Index, MOS Short Form 36, and Pain Scales". The Spine Journal. 8 (6): 968–974. doi:10.1016/j.spinee.2007.11.006. PMID 18201937.
- Schuler, TC (Nov–Dec 2007). "Corporate Culture and Beyond". SpineLine: 31–32.

== See also ==
- List of University of Notre Dame alumni
