= GivesMeHope =

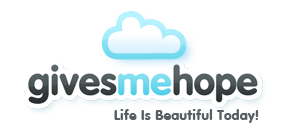
- Website type: Blog (user-generated)
- Owners: Emerson Spartz and Gaby Spartz
- Website: givesmehope.com
- Launched: May 31, 2009
- Current status: Closed 2016

GivesMeHope (GMH) was founded in May 2009 in response to the popular site, FMyLife (FML), itself a spin-off of popular French website Viedemerde.fr. It was part of the Spartz Media Network. On the site, people share with the world their most hopeful, uplifting moments while answering the question, "what gives you hope?" According to Quantcast, GivesMeHope receives over 500,000 hits every day. As of August 5, 2009, the website has over 160,000 fans on Facebook. A book containing stories from the site was released in the Fall of 2010

== History ==
The site was co-founded by Notre Dame graduates Emerson Spartz and Gaby Montero. Exhausted by the negativity of the media, they created GivesMeHope. The two refer to the site as "Chicken Soup for the Soul – the 21st Century, Twitter-style version."

GivesMeHope has inspired movements of hope across the country. At Henry M. Gunn high school in Palo Alto, California, four students committed suicide in a period of 8 months. To cope with the grief, students created a blog, modeled after GivesMeHope, to provide a place for members of the community to share their uplifting experiences at the school. The blog was named HMGGMH (Henry M. Gunn Gives Me Hope).

Another movement of hope inspired by GivesMeHope is Operation Beautiful, a website whose mission is to end "Fat Talk.” Participants of Operation Beautiful leave anonymous post-it notes with encouraging messages in public places for other women to find and be inspired by.

The site has received attention from the media due to its uplifting nature. On August 2, 2010, CNN stated that GivesMeHope was a website that may "help renew your faith in the goodness of the human experience." CNN described the stories as "sentimental and, at times, almost heartbreakingly sweet."

On December 30, 2009, the two launched a GivesMeHope spin-off site LoveGivesMeHope.com (LGMH). The site aimed at those who "can't get enough of the love stories on GivesMeHope". As of August 5, 2010, LoveGivesMeHope has over 160,000 fans on Facebook. The stories are shared widely on platforms such as Facebook. Since February 1, 2010, the site has produced some stories that have been shared over 565,000 times on Facebook.

== Book ==
On August 3, 2010, the two creators officially announced that a book was planned for release in Autumn 2010. The book was published by Ulysses Press, and is a combination of old and new illustrated anecdotes from the website.

== See also ==
- FMyLife
- MyLifeIsAverage
- Texts From Last Night
