= MyLifeIsAverage =

Humor website

- Website type: Blog
- Available in: English
- Creators: Guru Khalsa and Enrico Mills
- Website: mylifeisaverage.com at the Wayback Machine (archived May 14, 2010)
- Current status: Inactive

MyLifeIsAverage (MLIA) was a website where people would submit stories and tales of their day, about average occurrences and average people. MLIA was a spin-off from the website FMyLife. The website's purpose was to demonstrate to its readers that, like them, there are many average people in the world. MLIA sought to show that a person being average does not necessarily mean that they are boring.

MLIA was co-founded by UCLA students Guru Khalsa and Enrico Mills. Khalsa said that MLIA sought to "bring to light how much stupid and boring stuff gets posted on the Internet." Nathalie Graham wrote in The Stranger in 2019, regarding MyLifeIsAverage, that "The site doesn't really work anymore".

== Submission ==
After being submitted, the stories were screened by moderators. If enough users voted that the story was worthy of being posted, then it became the first story on the home page, and would later be pushed down the page. The website allowed anyone to submit stories for a chance of publication. After being posted, users could click on the story I.D. to leave a comment. The stories almost always began with the word "Today" and ended with the phrase "MLIA".

MLIA received more than 2,000,000 stories. On average, each story garnered several hundred votes. The majority of the users were students in high school or college.

MLIA contained humorous reasons for the existence of its features. When a person would attempt to add a story when not signed in, the page would read: "Our mediocre server was being inundated with submissions, so until it recovers, only registered users can submit." As a response to why a user should join, MLIA stated: "No one cares. It would let you comment on submissions, but really, does anyone need or want to read your literary flatulence?"

Karin Fuller of The Charleston Gazette found a number of MLIA stories to be her favorites. In The Charleston Gazette, Fuller shared the MLIA post: "Today, I saw a commercial about a dandruff shampoo that said '85 percent of women agree that dandruff is a turn-off.' Does that mean 15 percent think it's a turn-on? MLIA." She also shared: "Today, I met a girl named Unique. She has an identical twin sister. No one else thought it was funny. MLIA." A third story she chose was: "Today, I was helping my 10-year-old brother with his homework. One math problem ended with 'Is Susie correct? Explain.' I told him you never argue with women. He wrote that. He got full credit. MLIA."

== Inactive website ==
The Stranger's Nathalie Graham, a former user of the website, wrote in 2019 about MyLifeIsAverage, "It was formulaic, it was consumable, and it was easily mocked. It was my gateway drug into being very online." She found that MLIA participants started a tight-knit community in which initially comments were largely about MLIA submissions but later comments were just an avenue to engage in unrelated online chats. The next stage of MLIA comments was that some participants began using year-old submissions to engage in cybersex, causing cruel cyberbullying to take place. MLIA moderators began prohibiting commenters from using profanity which caused people to use "asterisk workarounds" such as "sh*t" instead of "shit" and to use "fudging" instead of "fucking" which Graham found "really solidified the death of the comments section and the death of the site". Graham said the MyLifeIsAverage website "doesn't really work anymore".

== MyLifeIsTwilight ==
MyLifeIsAverage inspired the website MyLifeIsTwilight (MLIT), which was founded by Christopher McElvogue. MyLifeIsTwilight allows users to share stories about how Twilight has impacted their lives. The website publishes submissions that applaud and criticize the Twilight books.

Journalist Emily Handy wrote in The Oracle that "the site offers an entertaining look into the world of Twilight fans that will both entertain and disturb". She shared a MLIT post: "Today I asked my boyfriend if he would hold ice to his lips for a minute before he kissed me, so I could pretend I was kissing Edward. He did. MLIT."

== See also ==
- FMyLife
- Texts From Last Night
- GivesMeHope
