= Alexander Jones =

Alexander Jones may refer to:

== Politicians ==
- Alexander H. Jones (1822–1901), U.S. representative
- Alexander Jones (MP), 16th century British Member of Parliament for Bridgewater (1597–1598)

== Others ==
- Alexander Jones (footballer) (1854–1878), Welsh international footballer
- Alexander Delos "Boss" Jones (1818–1897), American master carpenter and architect
- Alexander C. Jones (1830–1898), American businessman and Confederate soldier
- Alexander Jones (classicist), on List of Guggenheim Fellowships awarded in 2005
- Alexander Jones (officer), on HMS Naiad
- Rev. Alexander Jones, general editor of the Jerusalem Bible (1966)

== See also ==
- Alex Jones (disambiguation)
- Alec Jones (1924–1983), British Labour Party politician
