= Emerson Spartz =

American media executive

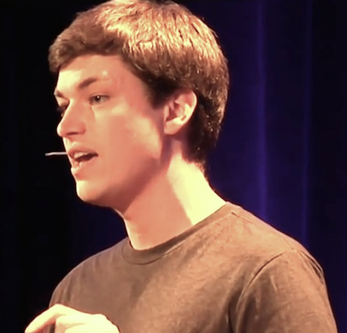
- Born: February 17, 1987 (age 39); LaPorte, Indiana, U.S.
- Occupation: Founder of Dose
- Known for: MuggleNet, OMG Facts, GivesMeHope
- Parent(s): Tom and Maggi Spartz
- Website: www.emersonspartz.com

Emerson James Spartz (born February 17, 1987) is the founder of the viral media company Dose and the founder of MuggleNet, a Harry Potter fansite.

== Early life ==
Spartz was born in La Porte, Indiana to Tom and Maggi Spartz. He is the oldest of three brothers. At the age of twelve, Spartz convinced his parents to allow him to drop out of school and homeschool himself. He developed his own curriculum, which his parents supplemented by requiring him to read four single-page biographies of successful people every day, which were collected from the pages of Investor's Business Daily. Spartz has subsequently attributed some of his entrepreneurial success to reading these short biographies.

== Career ==
=== MuggleNet ===
Using the WYSIWYG site-building tool Homestead, Spartz founded MuggleNet, a Harry Potter news website and forum, in 1999, at the age of twelve. In fall 2006, while a junior at Notre Dame, Emerson co-authored a book, MuggleNet.com's What Will Happen in Harry Potter 7, which speculated on plot elements of the final Harry Potter book to be released in July 2007. The book remained on the New York Times Children's Bestseller List for six months, peaking in the number two position and selling 350,000 copies. In June 2007, Spartz went on a tour with Ben Schoen, another MuggleNet staff member, to promote their work.

In 2009, Emerson Spartz and Ben Schoen wrote another book, MuggleNet.com's Harry Potter Should Have Died: Controversial Views From The #1 Fan Site.

By 2007, Spartz was receiving a six-figure income for running MuggleNet and had recruited six paid and 120 volunteer staff to the site. In 2015, he stated, "As I became less motivated by my passion for the books, I got obsessed with the entrepreneurial side of [MuggleNet], the game of maximizing patterns and seeing how big my reach could get." Spartz sold MuggleNet and severed his relationship with the magical brand soon after. MuggleNet became an independent brand in 2020. They work closely with their business partner, Topix Media.

=== Dose ===
In 2009, Spartz launched Spartz Media, now called Dose, a company that originally crowdsourced viral web content across thirty websites. In May 2009, Spartz and Gaby Montero founded GivesMeHope, a website where contributors share answers to the question "what gives you hope?" in the form of anonymous anecdotes. The site was created in response to FMyLife.

In January 2010, Spartz launched OMG Facts. In 2012, OMGFacts.com received 30 million monthly page views, and had 500,000 subscribers on YouTube.

Spartz has launched at least thirty websites under the Spartz Media brand, all of which primarily rely on social media sites for web traffic. Because these sites have increasingly operated by republishing previously developed viral content, Spartz's content strategy has been characterized as arbitrage and has been criticized for failing to license or provide attribution for copyrighted media.

In 2014, the company launched Dose.com. In 2015, the company changed its name to Dose and raised $25 million in venture financing, bringing its total capital raised to $34.5 million.

In 2016 Spartz was named to the Forbes 30 Under 30 list.

== Personal life ==
Spartz graduated in May 2009 from the University of Notre Dame's Mendoza College of Business. Emerson has stated that he read one book of nonfiction per day during college.

Spartz married Gaby Spartz (née Montero), his college girlfriend, in 2011. They divorced in 2017. After dating for 5 years, Emerson married Kat Woods at the Adler Planetarium on June 27, 2025.
