= David Berges =

British businessman

David Berges is a former chairman of the board and chief executive officer of Hexcel, a composite materials producer based in Stamford, Connecticut. Berges stepped down as CEO in August 2013. The multi-billion dollar company produces plastics and other materials for the aerospace and defense industries. Berges is credited with reforming the company and reversing its previous decline.

Berges' career arcs from technical and managerial positions up to the executive level, including time with the General Electric Company, Barnes Aerospace, AlliedSignal Aerospace and Honeywell International. Berges served on the board of directors of Dana Holding Corporation until January 31, 2008.
