= Cast of Shadows =

2005 novel by Kevin Guilfoile

- Author: Kevin Guilfoile
- Language: English
- Genre: Fiction
- Publisher: Knopf
- Publication date: March 1, 2005
- Publication place: United States
- Media type: Print (hardcover)
- Pages: 336 pages
- ISBN: 1-4000-4308-5
- OCLC: 56012602
- Dewey Decimal: 813/.6 22
- LC Class: PS3607.U48 C37 2005

Cast of Shadows is a 2005 suspense novel by the American writer Kevin Guilfoile. It was published in the United Kingdom under the title Wicker.

== Plot summary ==
The book's plot is set in the near future at a time when cloning has been legalised in the U.S. It is based around a Chicago-based cloning doctor, Davis Moore, whose daughter is brutally raped and killed. The doctor uses the murderer's DNA to clone him. The resulting clone is a boy called Justin Finn, whom Moore follows throughout his life, hoping the boy will offer a glimpse into the killer's psyche and perhaps enable Moore to find the identity of his daughter's murderer.
