= Maxillary lateral incisor agenesis =

Lack of tooth development

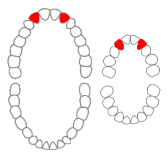
Schematic of maxillary lateral incisors in the human mouth for both permanent and primary teeth.

Maxillary lateral incisor agenesis (MLIA) is lack of development (agenesis) of one or both of the maxillary lateral incisor teeth. In normal human dentition, this would be the second tooth on either side from the center of the top row of teeth. The condition is bilateral if the incisor is absent on both sides or unilateral if only one is missing. It appears to have a genetic component.

== History ==
Dental anthropology has been a research topic of great interest for investigating tooth development evolution. The variations in number, size, and morphology of teeth among populations have been able to provide insights for genetic basis of odontogenesis. The origins of teeth is believed to have come from dermal structures called "odontodes," which became associated with bones. Phylogenetic changes in teeth has been associated with functional adaptation. The reduction of teeth number has been connected with the decrease size of the jaw in human expansion. Monkeys, apes, great apes, and homo sapiens were studied and it showed that homo sapiens have acquired a shorter maxillo-mandibular skeleton when compared to their ancestors.

The first set of maxillary lateral incisors (primary teeth) develop between the 14th and the 16th week, while being inside the uterus. By the age of 8 or 9, the permanent maxillary lateral incisors erupt as the root continues to mineralize until the age of 11 years old.

== Causes ==
=== Genetics ===
The reason for tooth agenesis has not been completely understood, despite the identification of several mutations in MSX1 and PAX9 genes which are related to tooth agenesis and mutations in AXIN2 gene which cause oligodontia. MSX1 and PAX9 are necessary transcription factors that help to form normal teeth. Studies done in mice, have shown that MSX1 and PAX9 encode transcription factors with different DNA binding sequence patterns, a paired domain and homeodomain, which are co-expressed during tooth development.

==== MSX1 ====
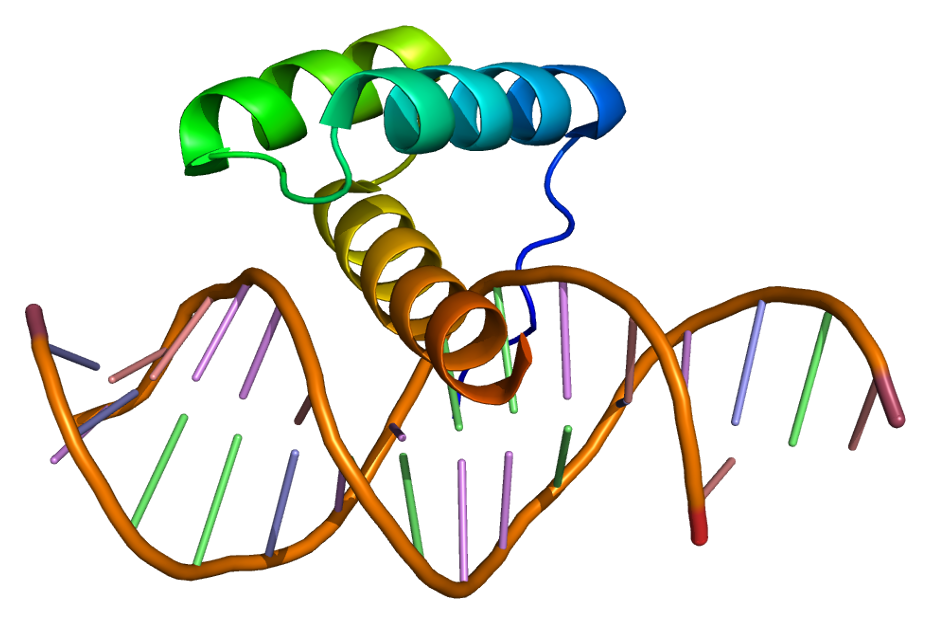
Structure of the MSX1 protein. Based on PyMOL rendering of PDB 1ig7.

MSX1 consist of homeobox encoding sequence of 60 amino acid long DNA binding homeodomain. The protein of MSX1 serves as a repressor for gene transcription and interchanges with other homeoproteins. In studies of homozygous mice, it has been found that deletion of the MSX1 gene has resulted in a double cleft palate, deficiency of the alveolar bone, failure of incisor and molar development.

==== PAX9 ====
PAX9 also plays a key role during embryogenesis. In addition, encoded proteins by PAX9 genes have a 128 amino acid long DNA binding paired domain. Studies suggest that all heterozygous mutations of PAX9 associated with lack of development were due to the loss of function in one of the protein copies, which resulted in haploinsufficiency. Furthermore, mutations of other genes have been identified in syndromes and congenital abnormalities in which tooth agenesis is a regular characteristic.

=== Endogamy ===
There have been studies that entail that a possible reason for maxillary lateral incisor agenesis was due to endogamy. A high incidence of the rare anatomical variant of MLIA was found in the population of Basta, southern Jordan. This was believed to be because of close genetic relationships. In anthropology, this would be considered a breed from closely related people or animals.

== Applications ==
Because MLIA can be detected from partial skeletal remains, it is useful in the field of anthropology. Anthropologically-interesting human remains often have relatively well preserved skeletons, but no soft tissues or intact DNA. This makes it hard to determine relationships between the deceased individuals. MLIA is sometimes related to inbreeding, so the presence of MLIA in many members of a large collection of remains can indicate that the population that lived there was relatively inbred. This technique has been used to study a group of Neolithic farmers.

Non-metric morphological traits, also known as epigenetic or anatomical variants, are a great tool for detecting individuals who are genetically related in historic populations if DNA is not well preserved. The method used is non-metric cranial and dental traits, which has already been tested on several burial sites. Identifying individuals who are genetically related from past populations is very important in order to determine if the families share a number of characteristics and phenotypical traits. Traits that are used for kinship analysis must be determine by genetic factors, must be rare in the general population, and the individual traits must be genetically independent from each other. The traits that are closely examined include: anatomical variants of tooth crowns and roots; shape, size, number, structure, and position of the teeth.

== See also ==
- Hypodontia
