= Kevin Guilfoile =

American writer

- Born: July 16, 1968 (age 58); Teaneck, New Jersey, U.S.
- Education: University of Notre Dame
- Occupations: Novelist; essayist; humorist
- Relatives: Bill Guilfoile (father)

Kevin Guilfoile (born July 16, 1968) is an American novelist, essayist and humorist.

== Biography ==
Born in Teaneck, New Jersey, Kevin Guilfoile was raised in Cooperstown, New York, where his father, Bill Guilfoile, was Associate Director and Director of Public Relations at the National Baseball Hall of Fame and Museum.

Guilfoile graduated from the University of Notre Dame in 1990, and worked briefly in media relations for the Houston Astros baseball club.

Guilfoile was a founding partner of the Chicago design firm Coudal Partners, and a creative director at that company for 11 years.

Guilfoile's first novel, Cast of Shadows, was published by Alfred A. Knopf in 2005. It was named one of the Best Books of 2005 by the Chicago Tribune and Kansas City Star, and has been translated into more than 15 languages. His second novel, The Thousand, was published in 2010, also by Alfred A. Knopf.

His most recent book is titled A Drive into the Gap, published by Field Notes Brand in 2012, in which he offers an intimate, entertaining and poignant chronicle of his love for his father and their mutual love of baseball, family and all that is important in this life.

Guilfoile is a contributor to The Morning News, McSweeney's Quarterly Concern and McSweeney's Internet Tendency. His essays have appeared in The New York Times Magazine, The New Republic, and Salon.com. His work has been anthologized in Mirth of a Nation, 101 Damnations, Chicago Noir, and Chicago Blues.

He is a frequent collaborator with John Warner.

== Works ==
- Modern Humorist's My First Presidentiary (2001) (with John Warner) (ISBN 0-609-80818-4)
- Cast of Shadows (2005) (ISBN 1-4000-4308-5) (British title: Wicker (ISBN 0-7181-4813-4))
- The Thousand (2010) (ISBN 1-4000-4309-3)
- A Drive into the Gap (2012) (ISBN 978-0-9858316-0-8), Field Notes Brand Books, Portland, Ore., Chicago Ill.
