= Hallow (app) =

Catholic prayer and meditation app

- Type: Private
- Industry: Meditation
- Founded: December 2018; 7 years ago
- Founders: Alex Jones; Erich Kerekes; Alessandro DiSanto
- Headquarters: Chicago, Illinois, U.S.
- Key people: Alex Jones (CEO)
- Website: hallow.com

Hallow is an American Catholic meditation and prayer app owned by Hallow, Inc.

The Hallow app provides audio-guided Bible stories, prayers, meditations, sleep, and Christian music. Other features include community challenges and daily prayers such as the Catholic practice of Lectio Divina, curated music, praylists, and options to set prayer routines.

Hallow is based in Chicago, Illinois in the United States. Alex Jones is the chief executive officer (CEO) of the company.

== History ==
Hallow was founded by Alex Jones, Erich Kerekes, and Alessandro DiSanto in December 2018. Alex Jones, who grew up as a Catholic, lost his faith as a teenager. With the use of meditation, Jones chose to revert to Catholicism and made the decision to create a platform to assist others in a similar situation.

In January 2022, the app was launched in the Spanish language.

As of February 2022, the app has been downloaded more than two million times. Hallow's subscription is available in two tiers: monthly and yearly. Since then actor Jonathan Roumie, who portrayed Jesus in The Chosen, has appeared in ads for the app.

In April 2022, Hallow announced a partnership with American actor Mark Wahlberg.

In June 2022, Hallow started the I am Here Eucharist campaign in partnership with the Roman Catholic Archdiocese of Detroit.

In April 2025, the app cut ties with British actor and comedian Russell Brand, after he was charged with rape and other sexual offenses.

== Controversies ==
In November 2023, Hallow received criticism from conservative Catholics, including Lila Rose, after partnering with actor Liam Neeson. This was due to Neeson having previously advocated for pro-choice causes, as well having fought to help successfully repeal the Eighth Amendment of the Constitution of Ireland. Following criticism, Jones defended Hallow's decision to hire Neeson. In December 2024, Jones changed his stance, describing the partnership as a mistake.

Conservative Catholic magazine Crisis has criticized Hallow as "shallow", and accused the app of "problematic monetization and celebritization of prayer". Giles Fraser of UnHerd has also criticized the app for its pricing model, which is set at $69.99 annually as of May 2025. Fraser also pointed to the app's estimated $51.4 million annual income, while comparing the subscription cost to medieval indulgences.

== Popularity ==
On Ash Wednesday in February 2024, Hallow reached the No. 1 spot in Apple's App Store, ahead of ChatGPT, Google and others.
