= Holly Ridings =

American mechanical engineer

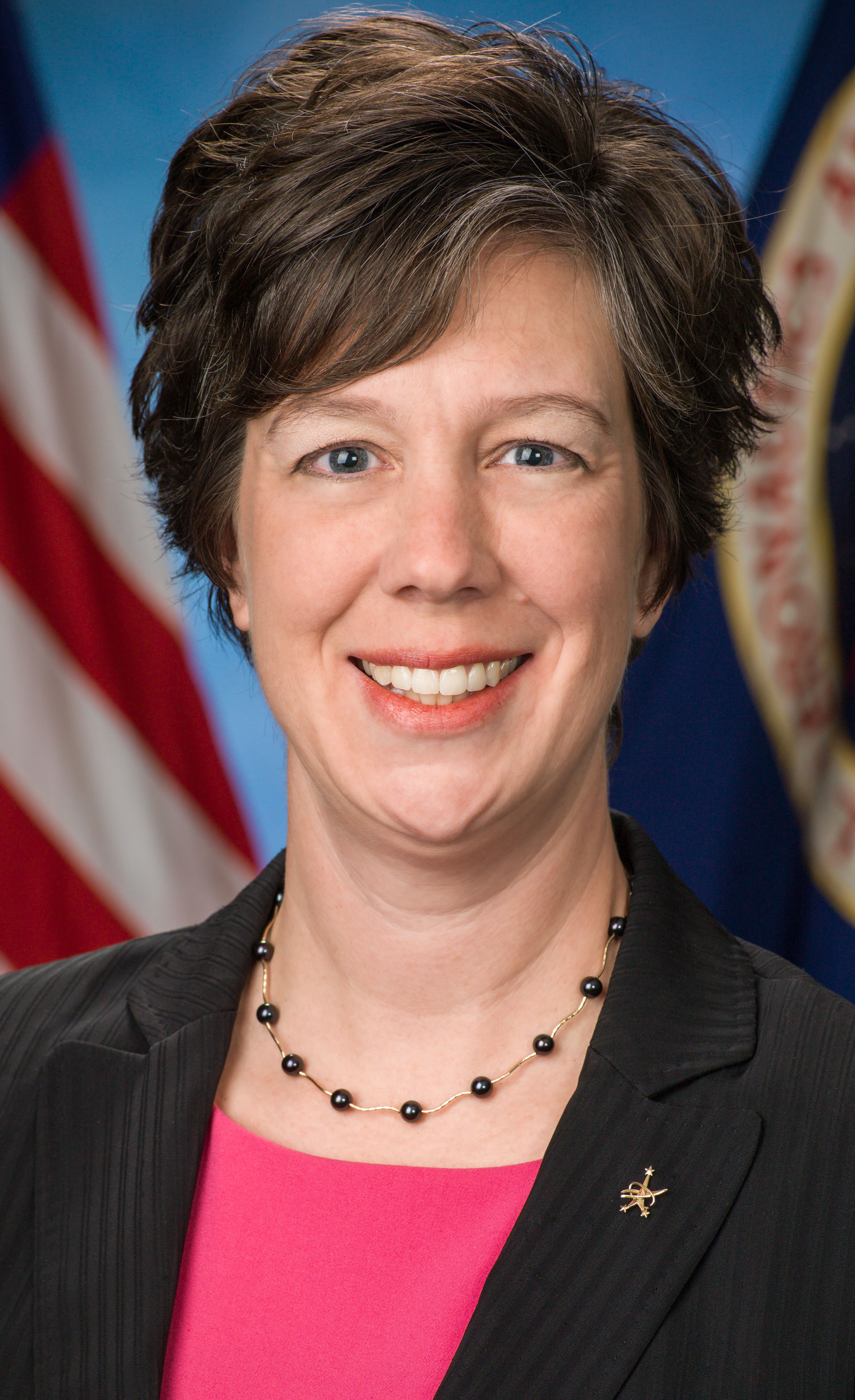
- Ridings' 2016 executive portrait
- Born: Holly Renee Ridings; December 25, 1973 (age 52)
- Education: Texas A&M University
- Awards: NASA Outstanding Leadership Medal
- Scientific career
- Workplaces: NASA; Johnson Space Center

Holly Elizabeth Ridings (born 25 December 1973) is an American mechanical engineer and was the first woman to be chief flight director at NASA. She works at the Johnson Space Center.

== Early life and education ==
Ridings was born in Amarillo, Texas. She attended Texas A&M University, where she studied mechanical engineering and graduated in 1996. Ridings was made a member of the NASA Academy. She took part in a student program at the Goddard Space Flight Center.

She is married to Michael Baine.

== Career ==
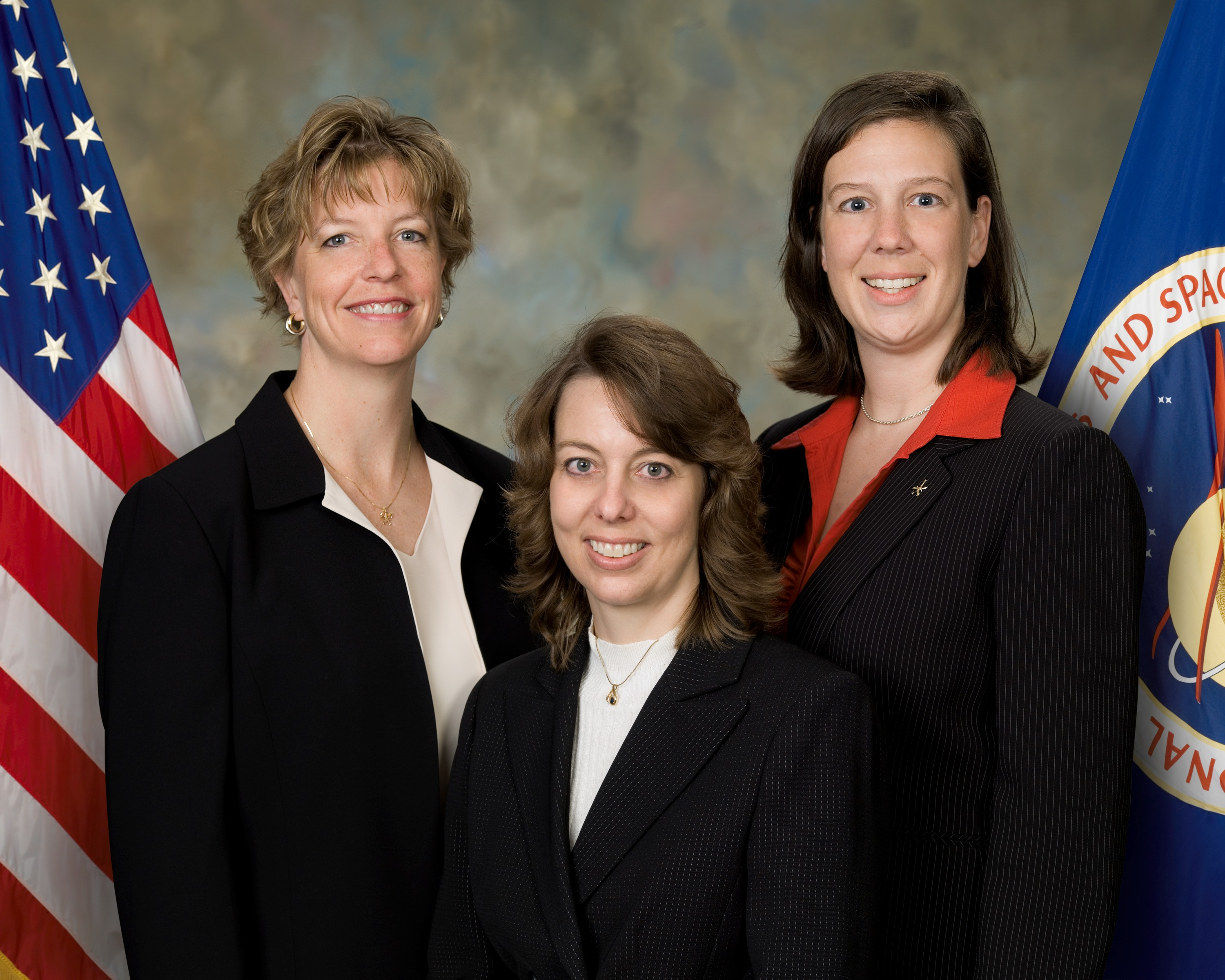
Flight directors for the STS-117 mission in June 2007. Annette Hasbrook (ISS Orbit 1), Kelly Beck (ISS Orbit 2 & lead) and Holly Ridings (ISS Orbit 3).

Ridings joined NASA in 1998, working as an International Space Station flight controller in the Thermal Operations and Resources Group. She eventually became lead for the International Space Station Attitude Determination and Control group. In 2003 she became lead for the Space Station Motion Control Systems Group. In 2005 she was made a flight director. She was lead director for Expedition 16, STS-127 and SpaceX Dragon. As expedition 16 lead, Ridings was responsible for the crew of the International Space Station for STS-120, STS-122, STS-123 as well as the first Automated Transfer Vehicle mission. During STS-127, Ridings oversaw major construction to the International Space Station, including the addition of the Japanese Exposed Facility and the External Platform. Ridings was promoted to Deputy Chief Flight Director. She was responsible for the safety of the International Space Station crew during the SpaceX Dragon Demo.

In September 2018 Ridings was announced as the chief flight director at NASA. She was responsible for 32 flight directors who oversee human spaceflight. She oversaw missions to the International Space Station, the Orion spacecraft as well as integrated trips of commercial crew spacecraft. Ridings served as chief flight director until 2022, when she was succeeded in that position by Emily Nelson. Ridings was promoted to lead the agency’s Gateway Program, an international partnership to establish humanity’s first space station orbiting the Moon.

=== Awards and honors ===
Ridings won the NASA Outstanding Leadership Medal for Expedition 16 and the SpaceX Dragon Mission.

Holly Ridings in 2022 at Johnson Space Center
