= Alex Jones (playwright) =

British actor, playwright and filmmaker

Alex Jones is a British actor, playwright and filmmaker. Born and bred in The Black Country, Alex became an actor and playwright after various jobs in the manufacturing and building industries. He is best known for Noise, a violent play about teenage newlyweds who face neighbourly aggression. As an actor, he played the villain Clive Horrobin in The Archers. Tours of his play include I’m a Minger (also nominated for The Brian Way Award) and River’s Up toured by the Oxfordshire Touring Theatre Company.

== Plays ==
- I'm A Minger! (Arts Theatre, Theatre503, National Tour, 2008/09)
- Deadwood (Watermill Theatre, Newbury, 1997)
- Noise (Soho Theatre, 1997)
- News of the World (1997)
- Mickey and Me (Birmingham Repertory Theatre)
- Phil&Jill&Jill&Phil (Belgrade Theatre, Coventry and Worcester Swan Theatre) (also produced by companies in Chile and Italy)
- A Miracle in No Man's Land
- River's Up (Worcester Swan Theatre and Stephen Joseph Theatre, Scarborough)
- River's Up (adapted for BBC Radio 4)
- The Worcester Pilgrim (BBC Radio 4, 2003)
- Mr and Mrs Schultz (Watermill Theatre, Newbury, 2004)
- Fields of Gold (Stephen Joseph Theatre, Scarborough, 2004)
- The Worcester Pilgrim (artworks at Worcester Cathedral, 2006)

== Films ==
- Greasy
- Faster, Harder, Longer, Whistle!
- Rhubarb and Roses

== Bibliography ==
- Jones, A. (1997). Noise, London: Nick Hern Books. ISBN 1-85459-353-6
