= Alex Jones (preacher) =

American Catholic deacon and preacher (1941–2017)

Alex C. Jones Jr. (September 18, 1941 – January 14, 2017) was an African-American Catholic permanent deacon, preacher and leader who converted from Pentecostalism to Catholicism.

== Biography ==
Jones was born in 1941. He graduated from Wayne State University in 1965 with a degree in art education. From 1975 to 1982, he was the senior minister in the Zion Congregational Church of God in Christ, the second oldest Pentecostal church in Detroit, Michigan, and from 1982 to 2000 he was the senior minister in Maranatha Christian Church, an Evangelical Charismatic church in Detroit.

Jones' road to conversion began in 1998, when he read the book Crossing the Tiber by Catholic apologist Stephen Ray, and thereafter began conducting some church services using Catholic liturgy. This prompted many members of the church to leave. The remaining adult members of the Maranatha Christian Church voted 39 to 19 to begin the process of converting to Catholicism in June 2001. In September 2001, the remaining members started studies at St. Suzanne Catholic Church. Jones himself converted to the Catholic faith that year and led some family members to join. Jones' conversion was not well received by some Catholics, and Jones' mother left to join Marvin Winans' Perfecting Church. Maranatha closed in December 2001 and the church building was sold to a Greek Orthodox congregation. The church voted to give Jones a severance package.

Jones was ordained a permanent deacon in the Archdiocese of Detroit on October 1, 2005. In 2007, he received a master's degree in pastoral studies degree from the Sacred Heart Major Seminary. Jones has written a book entitled No Price too High, detailing the circumstances of his conversion to the Catholic faith. He was a member of Prince of Peace Catholic Church.

=== Death ===
Jones died on January 15, 2017, due to heart attack complications. He was survived by his wife and their three grown sons.
