= Alex Jones (rugby league) =

Welsh rugby league footballer (born 1993)

Personal information
- Full name: Alex James Jones
- Born: 28 September 1993 (age 33) Church Village, Rhondda, Wales

Playing information
Club
Years	Team	Pld	T	G	FG	P
	South Wales Scorpions	32	8	0	0	0
- As of 31 Aug 2021

Alex James Jones (born 28 September 1993) is a Welsh rugby league footballer who played in the 2010s. He has played at club level for the South Wales Scorpions and was part of the 2012 Tri Nations Wales squad.

== Background ==
He is from the Church Village, Rhondda, Wales.
