= Alexandra Jones (archaeologist) =

US archaeologist

- Born: 1977 (age 48–49); Washington D.C.
- Occupations: Archaeologist; Educator
- Known for: Time Team America

Academic background
- Education: Howard University (BA); University of California, Berkeley (PhD)

Academic work
- Institutions: Goucher College
- Website: www.goucher.edu/faculty/alexandra-jones

Alexandra Jones is a historical archaeologist and educator at Goucher College. She is the founder and chief executive officer of Archaeology in the Community, "a Washington, D.C.–based nonprofit that aims to increase awareness of archaeology and history." She worked on the PBS television program Time Team America as Field Director of Archaeology in 2013.

== Early life and education ==
Jones attended Howard University, earning two Bachelor of Arts (BA) degrees in history and anthropology in 2001 and a Master of Arts (MA) degree in history in 2003. She earned a PhD in historical archaeology from the University of California, Berkeley.

While attending Berkeley, Jones participated in a community outreach project required of all students. Her outreach participation involved working with a local school and teaching archaeology to sixth-grade students. When her project was completed, she asked her community service advisor for permission to conduct the following year's project in her hometown of Washington D.C. Jones was granted permission and given funds for her community outreach activities on the East Coast. That experience inspired Jones to create the business she founded in 2009.

== Career and research ==
Jones founded Archaeology in the Community in 2009. Her organization works with local schools in the Washington D.C. and Maryland areas, conducting educational programs in archaeology. The organization also works with undergraduate students studying anthropology and sponsors community events that actively encourage the interest and understanding of archaeology.

Jones worked on season two of PBS's Time Team America, a television program about archaeology. As Field Director of Archaeology on the television show, Jones worked with middle and high school students at different archaeological sites around the United States.

She chairs the Department of State's Cultural Property Advisory Committee.
