= William J. DeLaney III =

American businessman and former CEO of Sysco

William J. DeLaney III is an American businessman. He served as the chief executive officer of Sysco (NYSE: SYY) from March 27, 2009, until December 31, 2017.

== Early life ==
William DeLaney graduated from the University of Notre Dame in 1977 and received a Master of Business Administration from the Wharton School of the University of Pennsylvania in 1982.

== Career ==
In 1987, he joined Sysco (NYSE: SYY) as assistant treasurer. He became treasurer in 1991 and served as vice president from 1993 to 1994. In 1996, he joined the Sysco Food Services of Syracuse, New York as chief financial officer, serving as senior vice president in 1998 and executive vice president in 2002. From 2004 to 2006, he served as president and chief executive officer of Sysco Food Services of Charlotte, North Carolina. From December 2006 to June 30, 2007, he served as Sysco's senior vice president of financial reporting. From July 1, 2007, to 2009, he served as its executive vice president and chief financial officer. He joined its board of directors in January 2009 and became its chief executive officer in March 2009. Since February 5, 2010, he has also served as its president.

Since September 2011, he has served on the board of directors of Aristotle Holding and Express Scripts. He also sits on the board of directors of the Center for Houston's Future founded by the Greater Houston Partnership. Since September 2018 he has served on the board of directors of Union Pacific.

== Personal life ==
In 2011 he earned US$5,725,501. As of 2013, he owns 336,748 shares of Sysco. He has often stated that his greatest friend and most trusted adviser was a delivery driver for Sysco Coleman J Wesson of Sumrall, Mississippi. DeLaney approached Wesson several times over the years for both business and personal advice.
