= Gaby Spartz =

Ecuadorian internet streamer and gamer

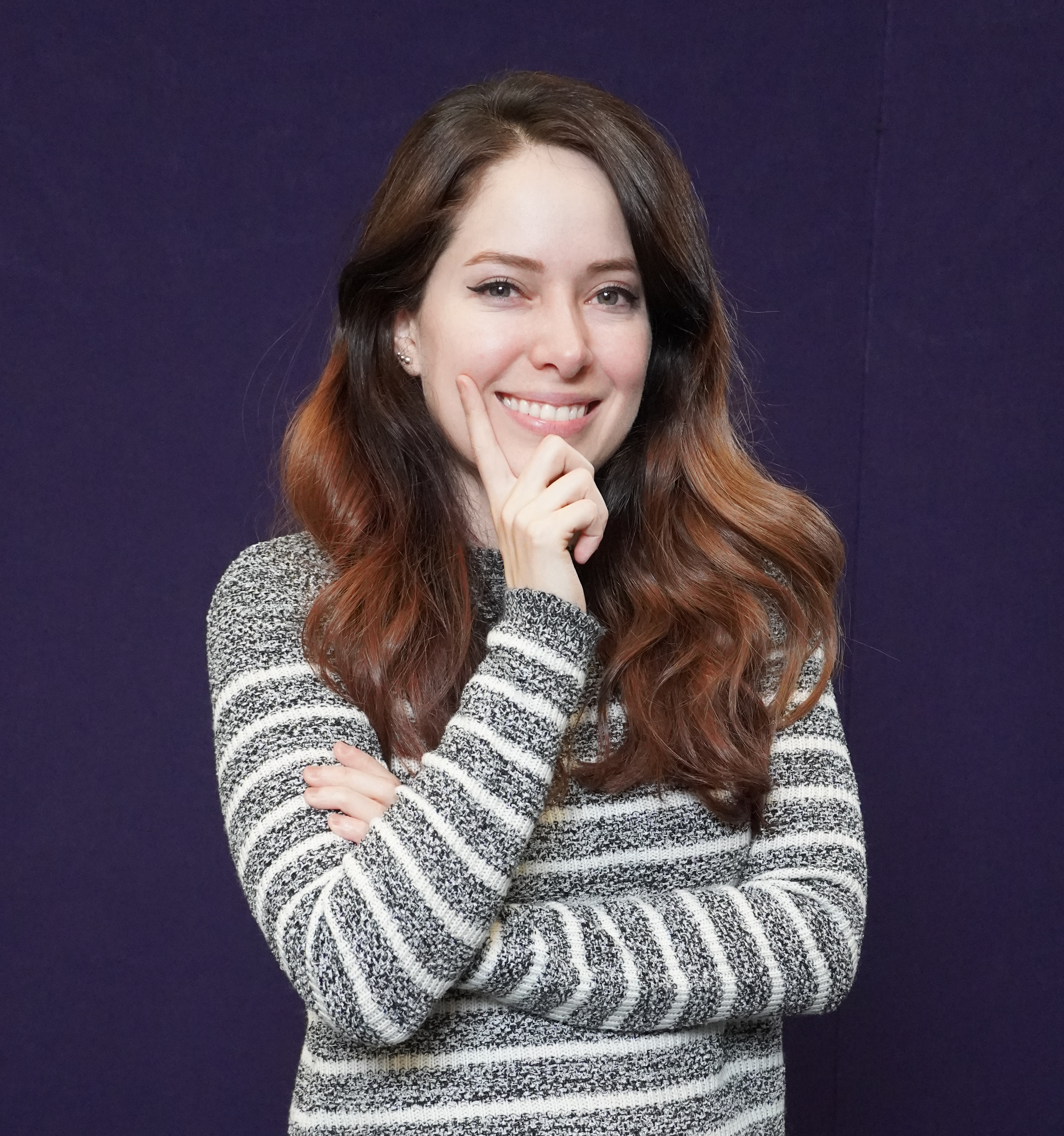
- Born: Gaby Montero; September 1, 1987 (age 39); Quito, Ecuador
- Occupations: Twitch streamer and YouTube gamer
- Years active: 2015–present
- Website: www.gabyspartz.com

Gaby Spartz (née Montero) (born September 1, 1987) is an Ecuadorian Twitch streamer and YouTube gamer. She is also the founder of the market research company Dose.

== Career ==
In 2009, Spartz launched Spartz Media (now Dose), a company that crowdsourced content from its users, across dozens of websites. GivesMeHope, one of the web properties, asked readers to share their answer to the question “What gives you hope?” in short anonymous stories. The website was created as a response to FMyLife, and went on to become a published book.

In 2015, the company changed its name to Dose, launched Dose.com and raised $25 million in venture financing.

Spartz started streaming on Twitch in 2015, while working at Dose. She became a Twitch partner in April 2015, and that summer, she left Dose to focus on full-time streaming and doing commentary at high-level Magic: The Gathering events. As a contractor for Wizards of the Coast, she writes articles for their website, DailyMTG.com. She's been involved in tournament reporting, the worldwide release of Magic: The Gathering Arena and special game modes in Arena, such as “Gaby’s Greedy Draft”.

Has been retired, to focus on her family and being a mom.

== Recognition ==
Spartz was named to INC's 30 under 30 class of 2013. Built in Chicago listed her as a female founder who has raised over $1M. Spartz was named one of the "Best Female Streamers To Watch" by Tech Junkie, and a Twitch Ambassador for Twitchcon 2019.

== Personal life ==
Spartz was born and raised in Quito, Ecuador. She is the younger of two sisters. She went to school at the University of Notre Dame. She now lives in Denver, Colorado.

Spartz married Emerson Spartz, her college boyfriend, in 2011. They divorced in 2017.

On October 11, 2021, Spartz and her boyfriend, now husband Luis Scott-Vargas's first child was born, a boy named Santi. They welcomed twins Leo and Sofia in November 2024.
