= Bill Guilfoile =

American baseball public relations executive

- Born: William J. Guilfoile; November 5, 1931; Fond du Lac, Wisconsin, U.S.
- Died: July 9, 2016 (aged 84); Notre Dame, Indiana, U.S.
- Education: University of Notre Dame
- Title: Public Relations Director of the National Baseball Hall of Fame and Museum
- Term: 1979–1996

William J. Guilfoile (November 5, 1931 – July 9, 2016) was an American professional baseball public relations executive, who served 18 years in the National Baseball Hall of Fame and Museum from 1979 through 1996.

Born in Fond du Lac, Wisconsin, Guilfoile graduated from Fond du Lac High School. He then attended the University of Notre Dame, where he graduated Magna Cum Laude and was president of his senior class. In addition, Guilfoile was elected to Who's Who in American Colleges and Universities and received Notre Dame's Dome Award, which is presented annually to four seniors selected as the outstanding members of their class.

Following his graduation, Guilfoile served as a naval officer for over three years, and received honorable discharge from the Navy in 1958. He then returned to Fond du Lac, where he began his public relations activities for the AC Nielsen Company.

In 1960, Guilfoile joined the New York Yankees of Major League Baseball, working as assistant public relations director for the club during 10 years. He later became director of public relations for the Pittsburgh Pirates in 1970 and remained in that role through 1978, working for World Series champion teams with both the Yankees in 1961 and 1962 and the Pirates in 1971.

In 1978, Guilfoile was named vice-president of public relations and assistant to the president for the National Baseball Hall of Fame in Cooperstown, New York, where he served the last 18 years of his baseball career.

During his 37-year tenure in baseball, Guilfoile witnessed and was part of many memorable moments in Major League's history, such as the 1961 Roger Maris/Mickey Mantle home run chase, the 3,000th hit of Roberto Clemente in 1972, and the Hall of Fame's 50th anniversary in 1989.

After his retirement in 1996, Guilfoile received the Robert O. Fishel Award, Major League Baseball's highest honor given to the single person who best exemplifies public relations excellence.

In 1957, Guilfoile married Loretta White in Brooklyn, New York. They became the parents of four children, Ann, Pete, Tom and Kevin, and also enjoyed 10 grandchildren. His son Kevin Guilfoile is a writer who has authored several books, including A Drive Into the Gap, which delves into the mystery surrounding the bat that Clemente used for his 3,000th career hit, along with his father's vastly blessed history with baseball and his battle with Alzheimer's disease.

After baseball, Guilfoile taught a course in public relations at Marian College in his hometown of Fond du Lac for five years. He retired in 2008 and moved with his wife to Notre Dame, Indiana, where he died in 2016 at the age of 84.
