= Alex Jones (business executive) =

American business executive

- Born: c. 1992 (age 33–34); United States
- Education: University of Notre Dame
- Occupation: Business executive
- Years active: 2018–present
- Known for: CEO of Hallow
- Title: Chief executive officer
- Children: Three

Alex Jones is an American business executive, entrepreneur, and chief executive officer (CEO) and founder of Catholic prayer app Hallow. NPR referred to him as "one of the most influential Catholics in the United States."

== Early life ==
Jones attended the University of Notre Dame, graduating in 2015. He fell away from his faith and began using secular meditation apps. He was drawn back to faith through meditation.

== Professional life ==
Jones and two co-founders started Hallow in December 2018. The app reached the #1 spot in Apple's App Store following a Super Bowl commercial. More than 1 billion prayers have been prayed on the app.
