= James Berges =

American businessman

James Berges was president of Emerson Electric Corp from 1999 until he retired in 2005. He resides in St. Louis, Missouri. He was involved in the company for over 30 years. Mr. Berges, with a degree in electrical engineering from the University of Notre Dame, previously worked for General Electric Corp. He earned compensation of $9.5 million in 2005.
