= FMyLife =

Blog

Fmylife
- Website type: Blog
- Available in: English, French, Indonesian, Italian, Spanish, Swedish, Russian and Turkish
- Owner: Ouiche Lorraine SARL
- Creators: Maxime Valette, Guillaume Passaglia and Didier Guedj
- Editors: Ray Chase, Ben Girou, and Logan Burdick
- Website: http://www.fmylife.com
- Launched: January 2008
- Current status: Active

FMyLife is an English-language blog that serves as "a recollection of everyday anecdotes likely to happen to anyone". Posts on the site are short, user-submitted stories of unfortunate happenings that begin with "Today" and end with "FML". At its peak in 2009, FMyLife received more than 1.7 million hits each day. A book containing stories from the site and illustrations was published in June 2009.

From 2013 to 2015, their video team, FML Video Guys, produced weekly videos featuring different FML stories.

== History ==
FMyLife was created on January 13, 2008 by Maxime Valette, Guillaume Passaglia and Didier Guedj. The site is the English version of the creators' original website in French, Viedemerde.fr, which translates as "shit life". VDM has become one of France's top ten sites. Anybody who visits the site can decide if the writer of each anecdote's life indeed "sucks" or if he or she "deserved" what happened. Members can submit stories and leave comments. Not every story submitted is posted on the blog.

FMyLife has drawn attention from some social commentators, such as sociologist Pierre Mannoni, who has stated, "Even if it's done with humour, it can be dangerous to describe oneself endlessly as a loser; it can prevent you from succeeding."

The website experienced a rapid increase in traffic in February 2009, according to a breakdown of web traffic by Alexa Internet.

In March 2009, FMyLife announced that they had secured a book deal. The book was released on June 9, 2009 and was available for purchase at Amazon, Borders, and Barnes & Noble stores.

In 2009, FML also released an iPhone/iPod Touch application, in which the user can submit their FMLs, rate them, comment on them or just read them. They released apps for Android, Blackberry, Windows Phone 7, and Java-based cell phones.

In 2013, FML began unrolling their new videos created by Ray Chase and Ben Giroux, known as the "FML Video Guys". The videos are directed and edited by Logan Burdick. Chase and Giroux had previously worked together creating web content for Awkward Universe, which FMyLife had been publishing on their site during 2012. As of February 2, 2015, their YouTube channel became inactive with Ben Giroux claiming new FML videos were coming to his channel. As of March 4, 2019, no new FML videos have appeared since on either the FML or Ben Giroux channel.
