= Thomas J. Tolan =

American architect

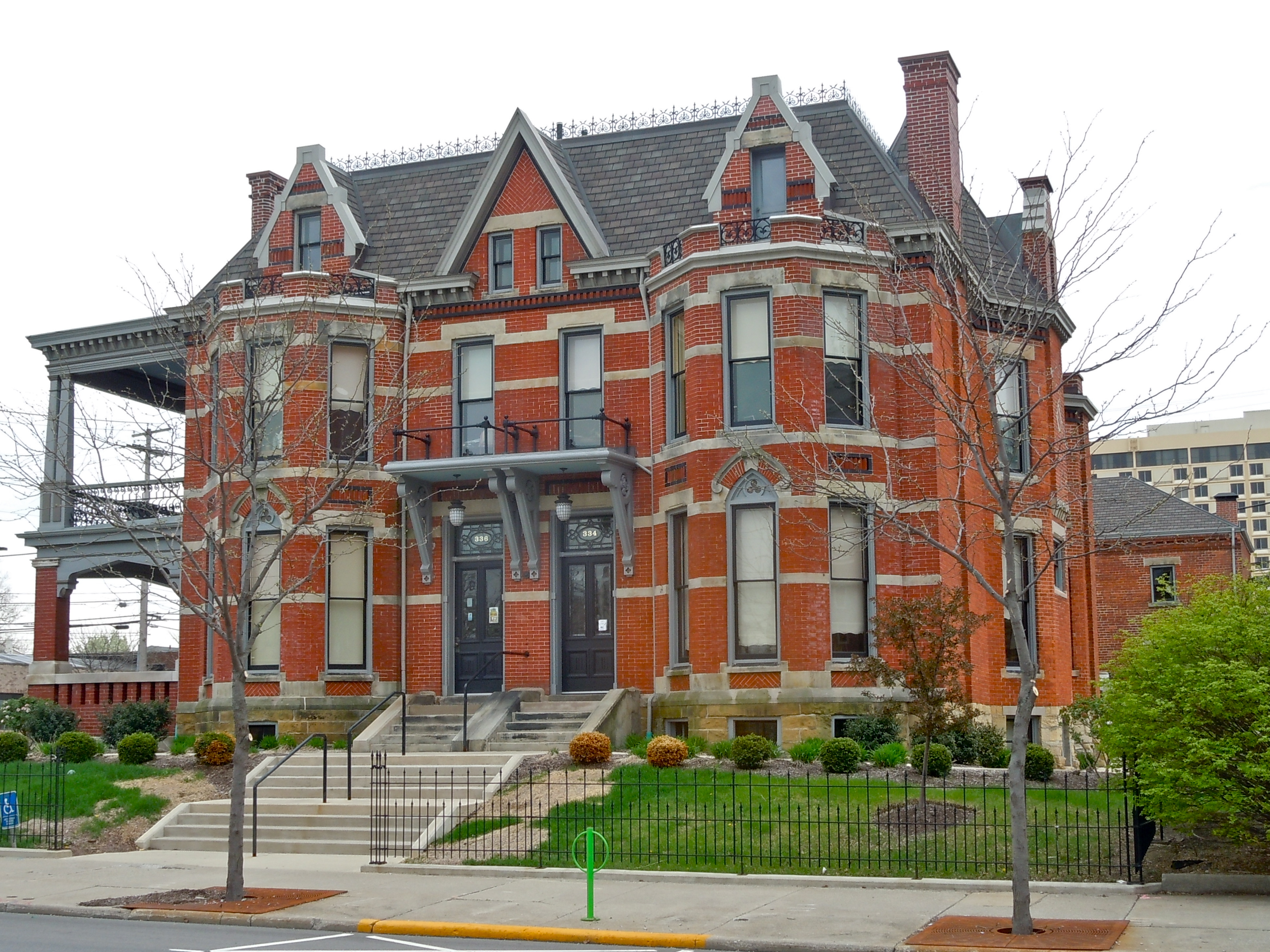
McColloch-Weatherhogg Double House in Fort Wayne, Indiana

Thomas J. Tolan (October 22, 1830 – January 31, 1883) was an American architect.

He was born in Carrollton, Ohio to James and Elizabeth Crabbs Tolan. Like his father, he began working as a marble cutter in Delphos, Ohio. He married Harriett Todd Skinner on October 24, 1853.

At some point in his life he made the jump from being a marble craftsman to an architect. In 1874, he moved his family and architectural practice to Fort Wayne, Indiana. The firm was known as T.J. Tolan & Son, Architects. His son Brentwood S. Tolan trained under with him and continued the practice after his death. Tolan and his son were noted for designing municipal and local government buildings, including courthouses and jails. In addition they designed some churches and fraternal buildings. His most notable work included the courthouses in Van Wert, Ohio, Cambridge, Illinois, Bloomfield, Iowa, and Rockville, Lagrange, and Warsaw, Indiana.

Tolan died while traveling on business in Chicago, Illinois. He is buried in Delphos, Ohio.

== National Register of Historic Places ==
- Davis County Courthouse in Bloomfield, Iowa (added May 3, 1974)
- Van Wert County Courthouse, Van Wert, Ohio (added July 30, 1974)
- Holmes County Sheriff’s Residence and Jail, Millersburg, Ohio (added July 25, 1974)
- Morrow County Sheriff’s Residence and Jail, Mount Gilead, Ohio (added July 25, 1974)
- La Grange County Courthouse, Lagrange, Indiana (added July 17, 1980)
- First United Methodist Church (Van Wert, Ohio) (added 1982)
- Noble County Sheriff’s Residence and Jail, Albion, Indiana (added December 27, 1982)
- Kosciusko County Courthouse, Warsaw, Indiana (added March 1, 1982)
- Parke County Courthouse in Rockville, Indiana (added May 27, 1993)
- McColloch-Weatherhogg Double House (J. Ross McColloch House), Fort Wayne, Indiana (added 2001)
- Henry County Courthouse (Cambridge, Illinois), Cambridge, Illinois (added August 20, 2004)

== Images ==
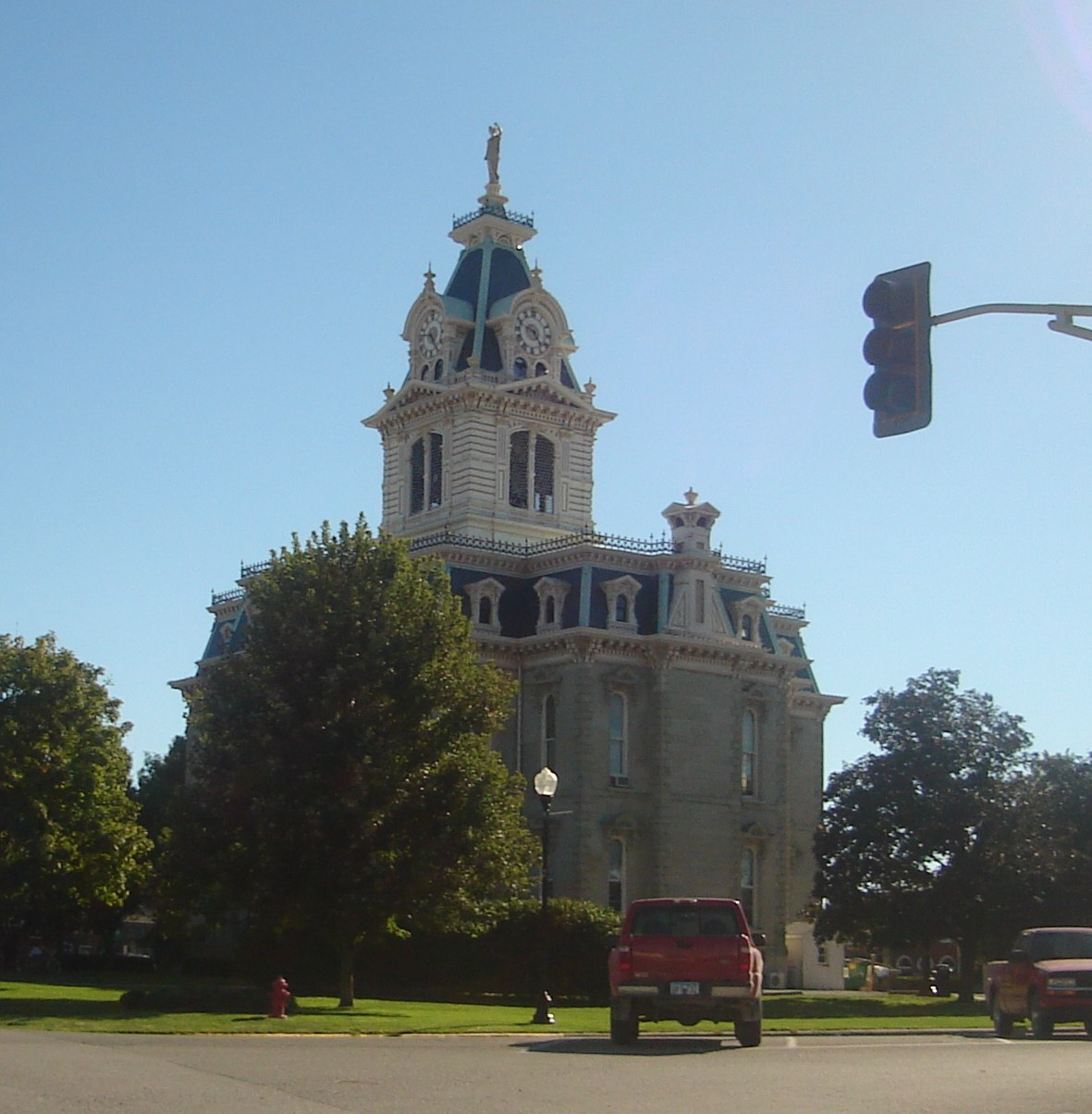
Davis County Courthouse, Bloomfield, Iowa

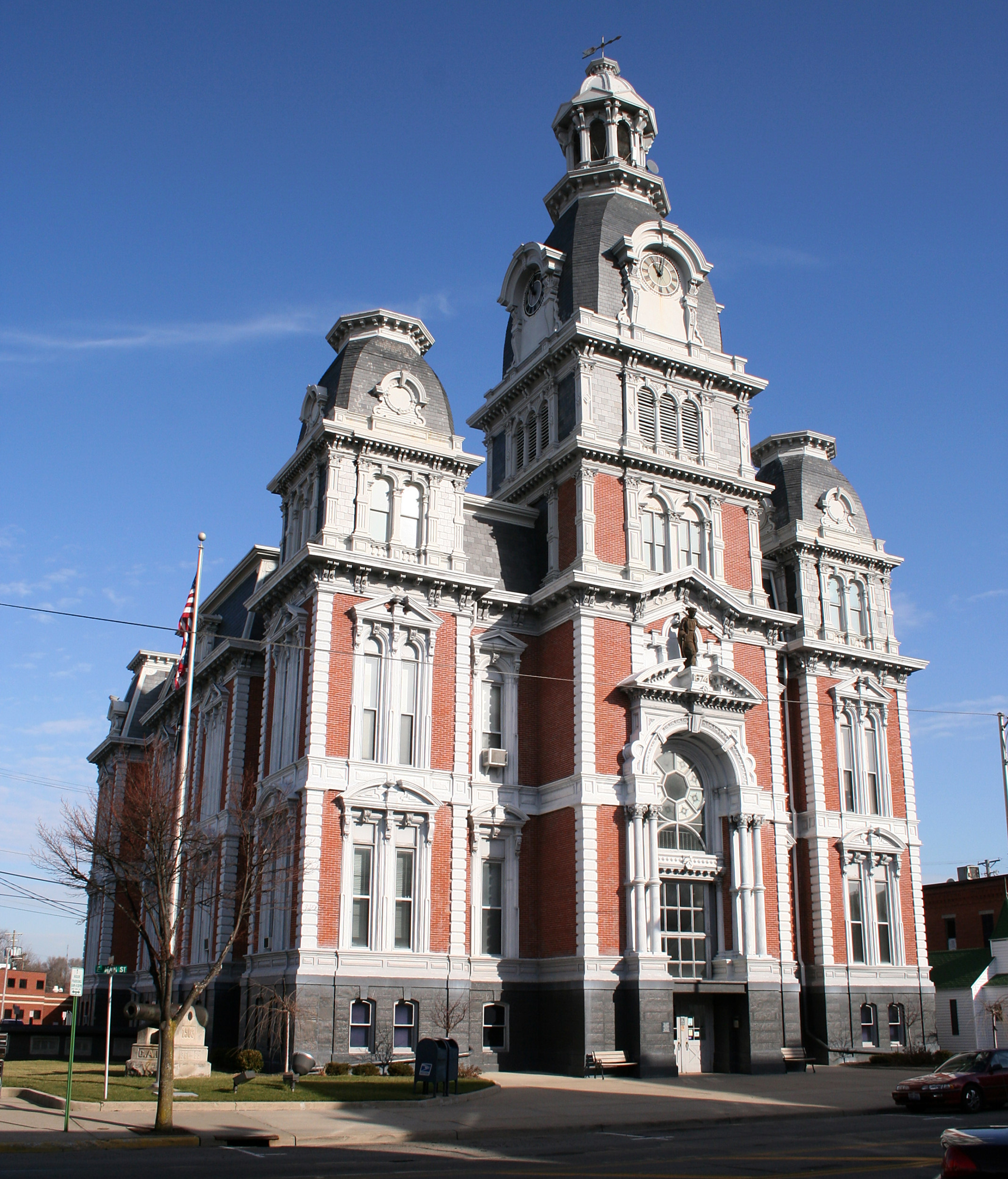
Van Wert County Courthouse, Van Wert, Ohio

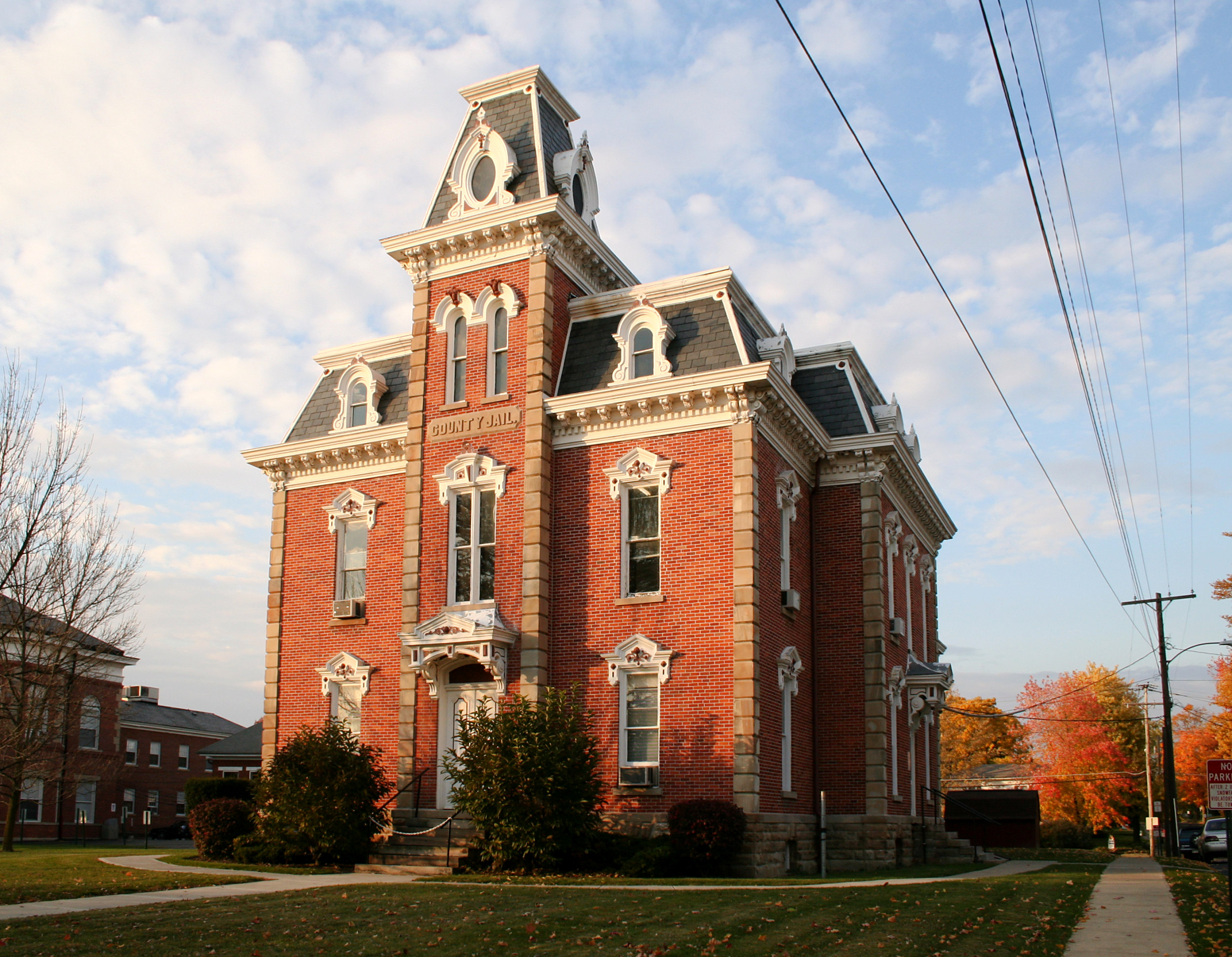
Morrow County Jail and Sheriff's Residence, Mount Gilead, Ohio

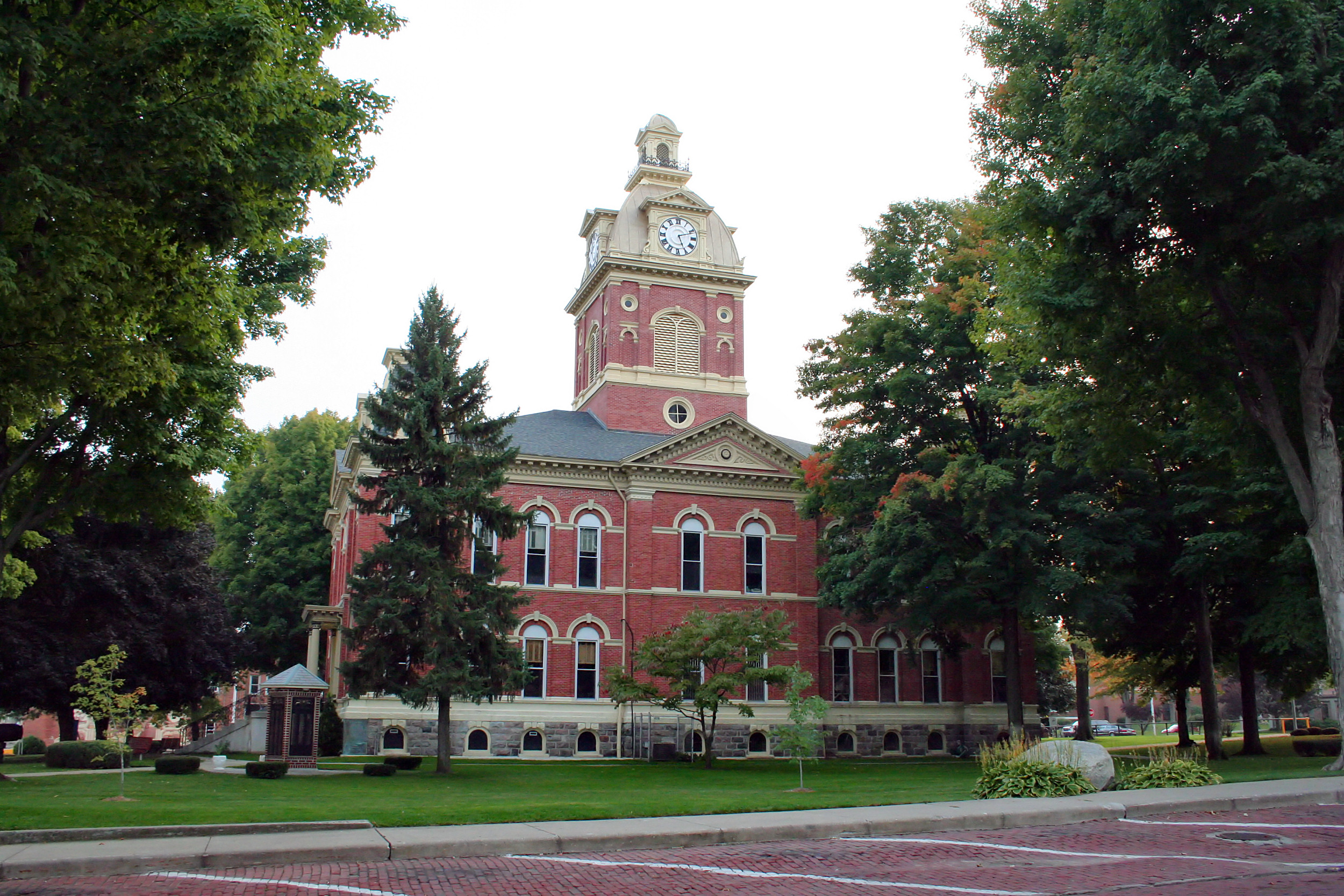
LaGrange County Courthouse, LaGrange, Indiana

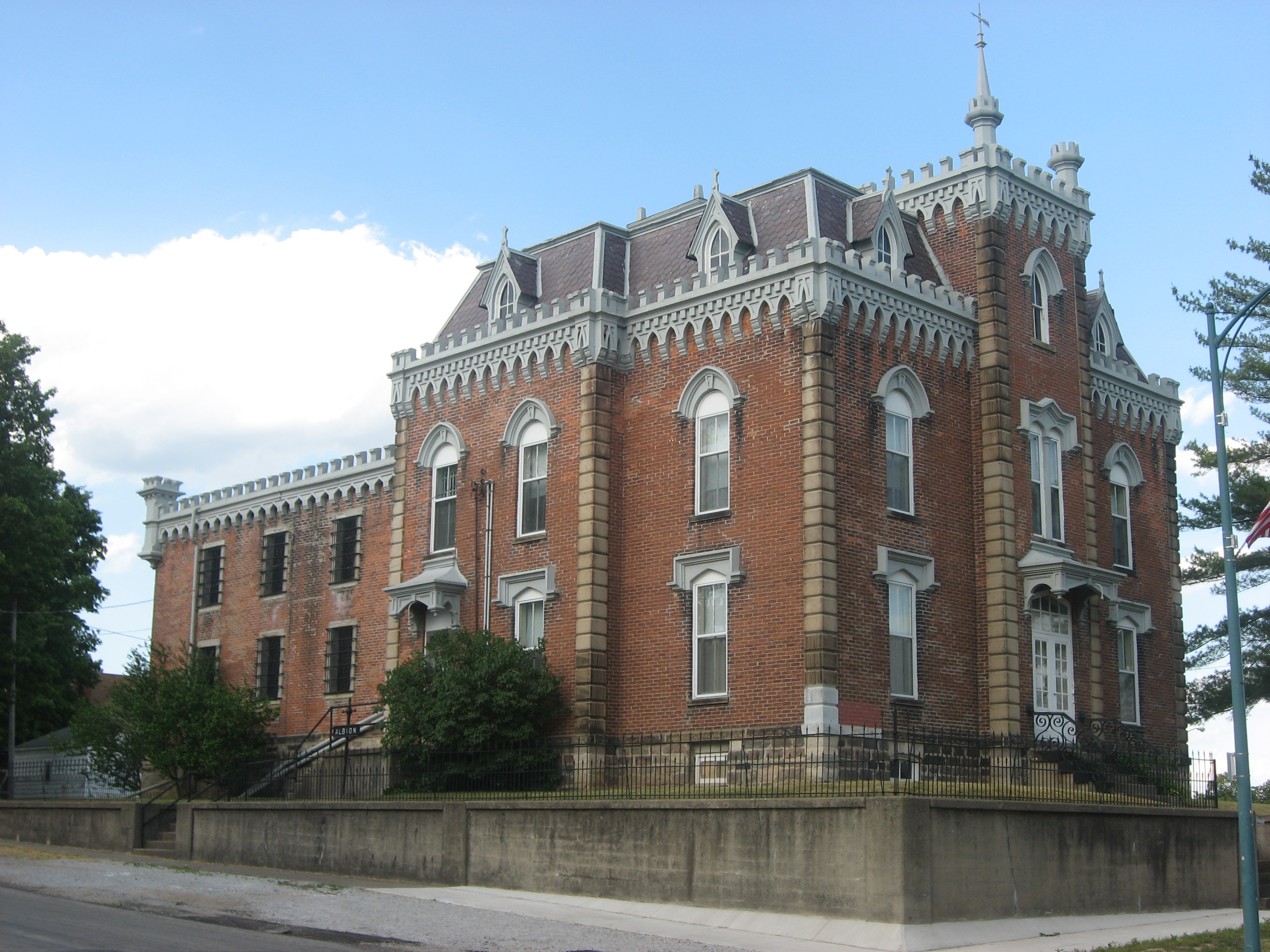
Noble County Jail and Sheriff's Residence, Albion, Indiana

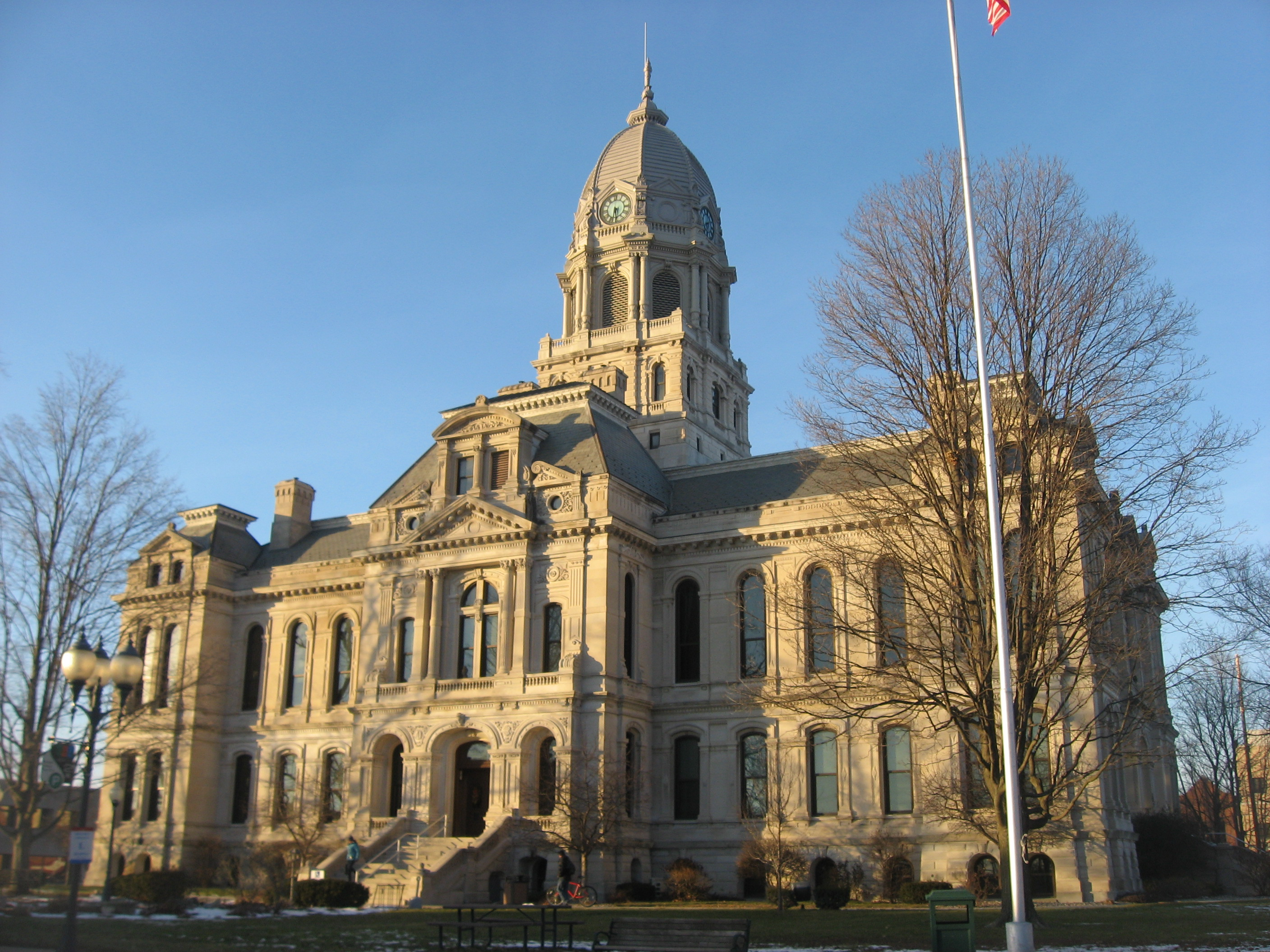
Kosciusko County Courthouse, Warsaw, Indiana

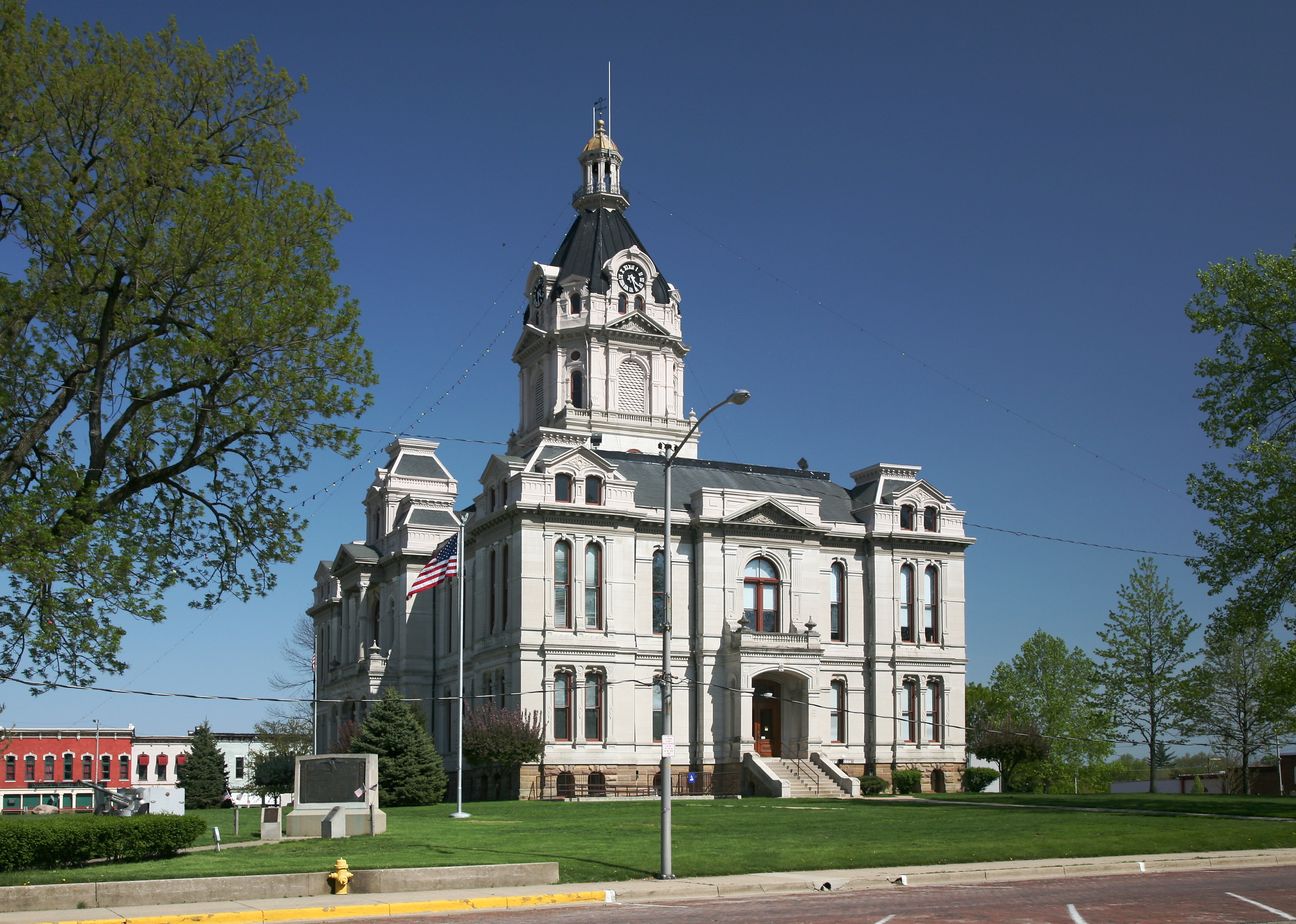
Parke County Courthouse, Rockville, Indiana
