= List of Indiana state historical markers in LaPorte County =

Location of LaPorte County in Indiana

This is a list of the Indiana state historical markers in LaPorte County.

This is intended to be a complete list of the official state historical markers placed in LaPorte County, Indiana, United States by the Indiana Historical Bureau. The locations of the historical markers and their latitude and longitude coordinates are included below when available, along with their names, years of placement, and topics as recorded by the Historical Bureau. There are 9 historical markers located in LaPorte County.

== Historical markers ==
| Marker title | Image | Year placed | Location | Topics |
|---|---|---|---|---|
| Civil War Camps | | 1962 | Junction of W. State Road 2 and Colfax Avenue in La Porte; 41°36′1″N 86°44′19″W | Military |
| Chicago-New York Electric Air Line Railroad | | 1995 | Junction of State Road 39 and County Road 250 south of La Porte; 41°34′1″N 86°44′21.6″W | Transportation, Business, Industry, and Labor |
| Camp Anderson | | 1996 | 2404 E. Michigan Boulevard in Michigan City; 41°42′32.3″N 86°52′12″W | Military |
| Indiana Territory Boundary Line | | 1999 | 213 Pine Lake Avenue in La Porte; 41°37′0.6″N 86°43′58″W | Early Settlement and Exploration, Government Institutions |
| LaPorte County Courthouse | | 2001 | 813 Lincolnway on the southeastern corner of the LaPorte County Courthouse lawn in La Porte; 41°36′40″N 86°43′19″W | Government Institutions, Buildings and Architecture |
| La Porte's Carnegie Library | | 2002 | LaPorte County Public Library on the southwestern corner of the junction of 904 Indiana Avenue (U.S. Route 35) and Maple Avenue in La Porte; 41°36′32″N 86°43′1.6″W | Carnegie Library, Buildings and Architecture |
| The Rumely Companies | | 2003 | Northwestern corner of the junction of Madison Street and Lincolnway in La Porte; 41°36′36.5″N 86°43′25″W | Business, Industry, and Labor, Immigration and Ethnic Groups, Agriculture, Science, Medicine, and Inventions |
| The Lincoln Funeral Train | | 2010 | 100 E. Michigan Blvd. (U.S. 12), Michigan City | |
| La Porte University / Indiana Medical College | | 2018 | Southeast corner of Clay and Harrison Streets in La Porte; 41°36′36.0576″N 86°43′2.3736″W | Education |

== See also ==
- List of Indiana state historical markers
- National Register of Historic Places listings in LaPorte County, Indiana
