= LaPorte County Courthouse =

Coordinates: 41.611184°N 86.722173°W

- U.S. Historic district – Contributing property
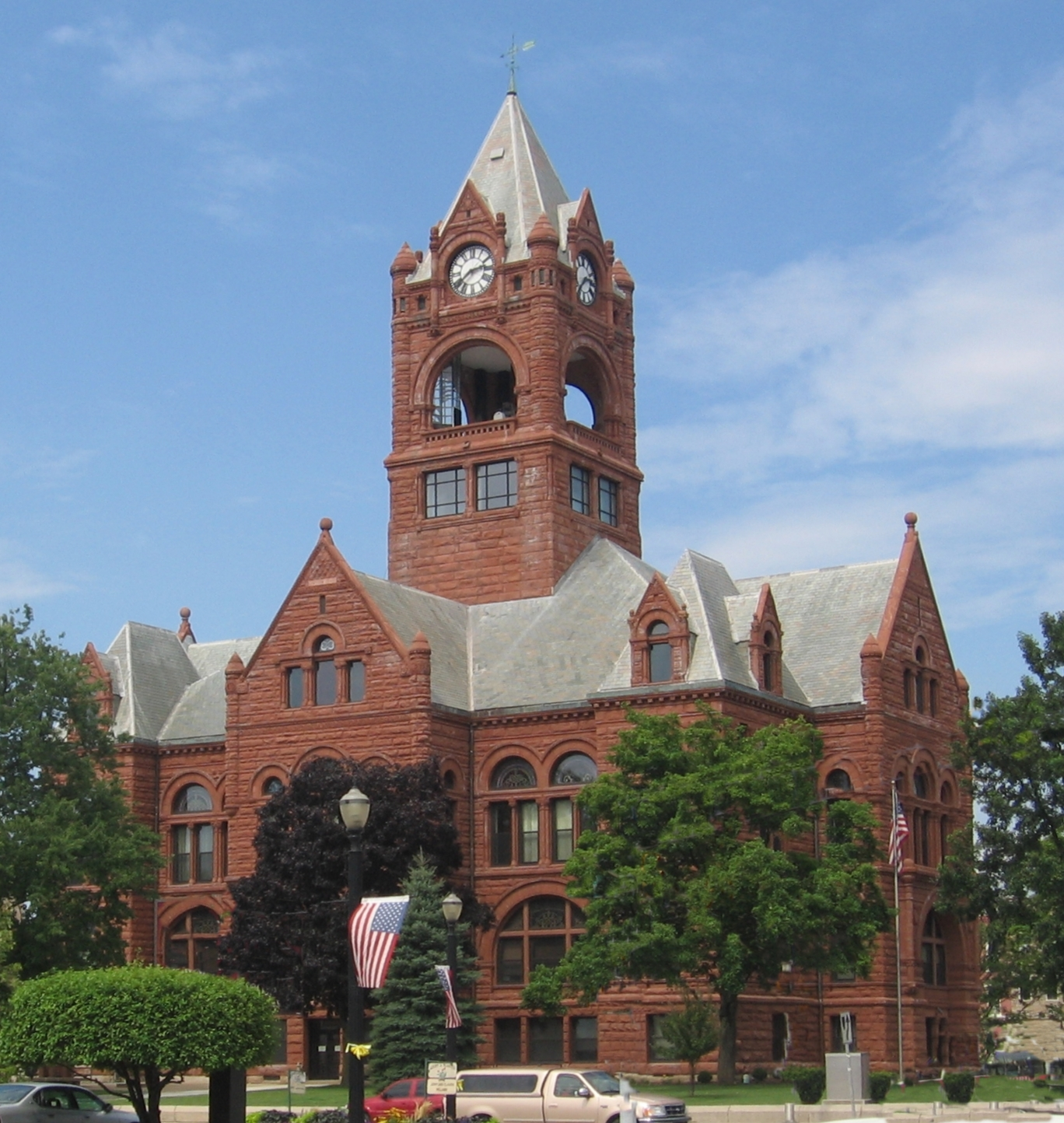

- Location within Indiana
- Location: LaPorte, Indiana
- Area: 35 acres (14 ha)
- Built: 1892
- Architect: Brentwood S. Tolan
- Architectural style: Richardsonian Romanesque
- Part of: Downtown LaPorte Historic District (ID83000039)
- Added to NRHP: September 15, 1983

The LaPorte County Courthouse is a historic county courthouse in La Porte, Indiana, the county seat of LaPorte County. Previous courthouses were built on this site on 1833, and the second 1847–1848. The current courthouse was designed by Brentwood S. Tolan and built from 1892 to 1894. It is Richardsonian Romanesque architecture in style and was built with Lake Superior Red Sandstone. The building includes a tower with skylight, gargoyles and contains stained glass. It is listed on the National Register of Historic Places. The courthouse is part of the Downtown LaPorte Historic District.

There is a historical marker that was erected in 2001 by the Indiana Historical Bureau, La Porte County Board of Commissioners, and La Porte County Historical Society, Inc.

== See also ==
- National Register of Historic Places listings in LaPorte County, Indiana
- List of Indiana state historical markers in LaPorte County
