= McColloch-Weatherhogg Double House =

Historic house in Indiana, United States

- U.S. National Register of Historic Places
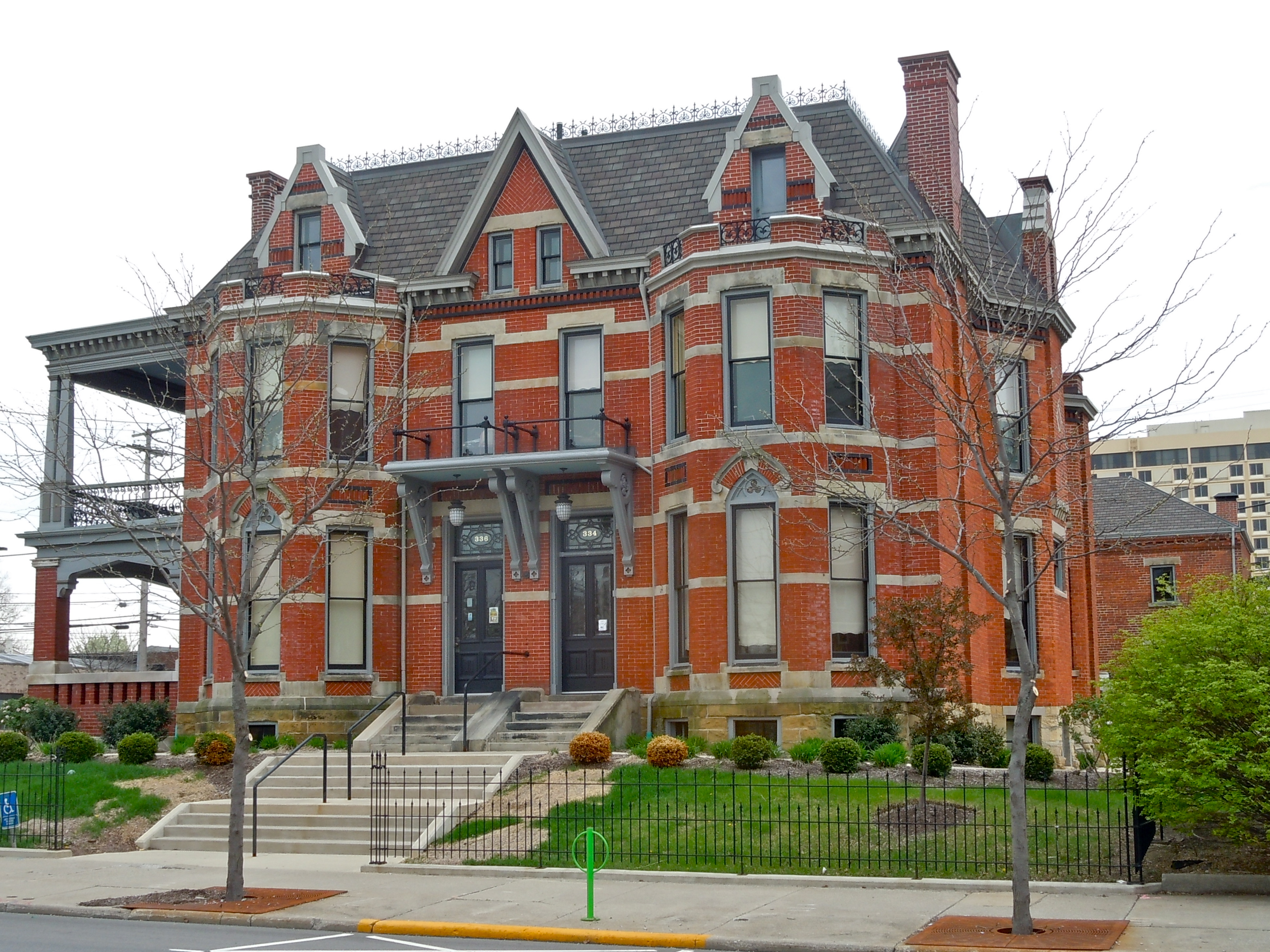
- The house in 2011

- Location within Indiana Location within the United States
- Location: 334-336 East Berry Street, Fort Wayne, Indiana
- Coordinates: 41°4′54″N 85°8′7″W
- Area: less than one acre
- Built: 1881
- Architect: Thomas J. Tolan; Charles R. Weatherhogg (1908 remodel); Robert Grafton (mural artist)
- Architectural style: Gothic Revival
- NRHP reference No.: 01001350
- Added to NRHP: December 7, 2001

The McColloch-Weatherhogg Double House, also known as the J. Ross McCulloch House, is a historic residential building constructed in 1883 in the Victorian Gothic Revival style at 334-336 E. Berry St., Fort Wayne, Indiana. The building is now the home of United Way of Allen County and was listed on the National Register of Historic Places on December 7, 2001.

The house was built for banker Charles McCulloch, whose father Hugh McCulloch was Secretary of the Treasury under Presidents Abraham Lincoln, Andrew Johnson and Chester A. Arthur. Thomas J. Tolan is believed to have been the building's architect.

Charles' sons John Ross McCulloch and Frederick McCulloch eventually lived on both sides of the house. It was also the residence of prominent local architect Charles R. Weatherhogg.

The home was once on the Historic Landmarks Foundation of Indiana's 10 Most Endangered Buildings List and in disrepair. The Historic Landmarks Foundation restored the building and adjacent carriage house beginning in 2003. Fort Wayne businessman Jerry Henry purchased the home in 2005 and did his own rehabilitation of the structure for the United Way. Kelty Tappy Design supervised the rehabilitation and also developed and filed the paperwork for historic certification with the National Park Service.

== See also ==
- National Register of Historic Places listings in Allen County, Indiana
