= Downtown LaPorte Historic District =

Historic district in Indiana, United States

- U.S. National Register of Historic Places
- U.S. Historic district
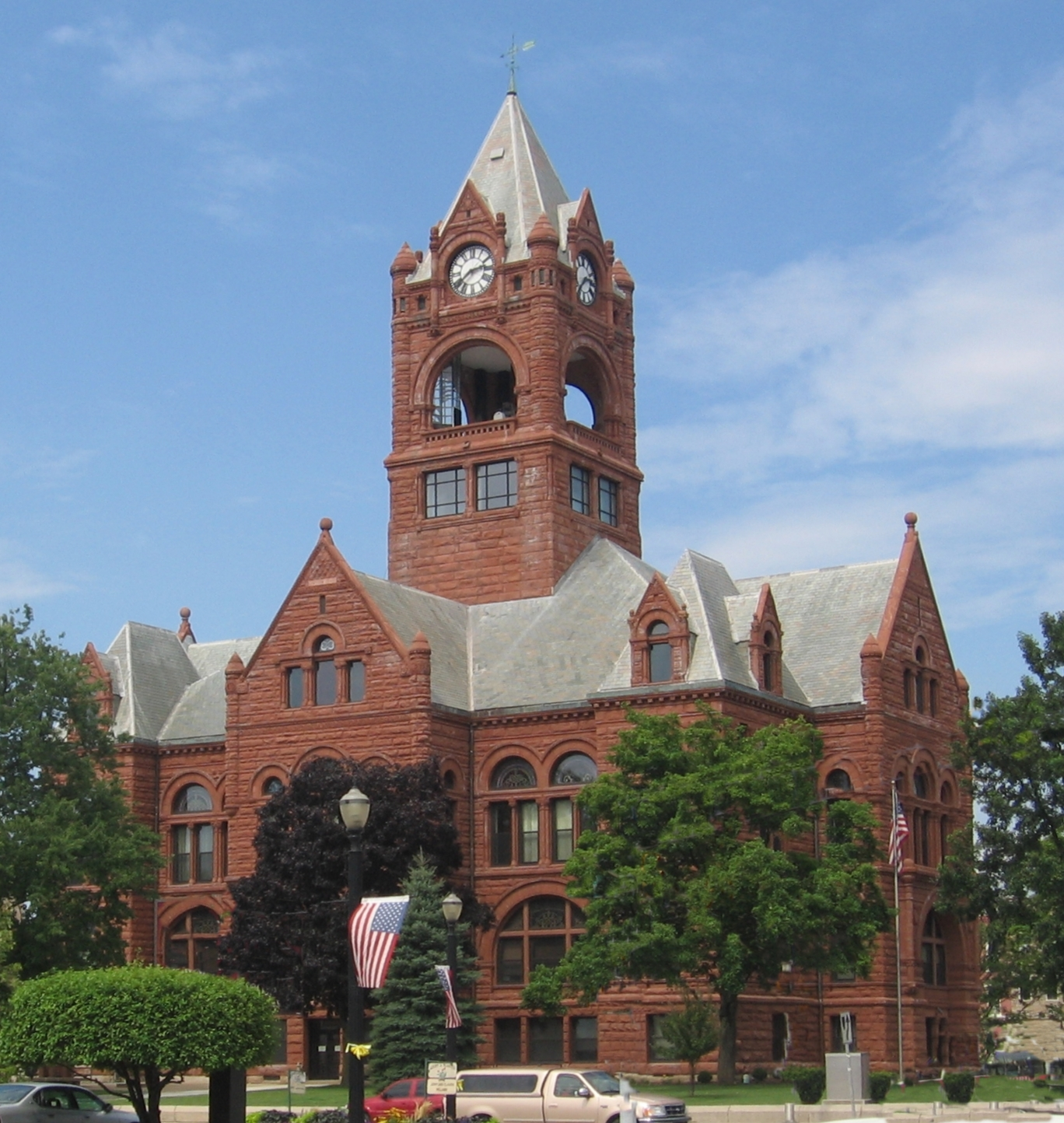
- Laporte County Courthouse, Spring 2007

- Location within Indiana Location within the United States
- Location: Roughly bounded by State, Jackson, Maple and Chicago Sts., LaPorte, Indiana
- Coordinates: 41°36′41″N 86°43′20″W
- Area: 35 acres (14 ha)
- Built: c. 1860
- Architect: Multiple
- Architectural style: Queen Anne, Romanesque, Neo Classical
- NRHP reference No.: 83000039
- Added to NRHP: September 15, 1983

Downtown LaPorte Historic District is a national historic district located at LaPorte, Indiana. The district encompasses 70 contributing buildings in the central business district of LaPorte. It developed between about 1860 and 1930, and includes examples of Queen Anne, Romanesque Revival, and Neoclassical style architecture. Notable buildings include the Zahrt Blocks (1868, 1874), Ridgway Hotel (1863), Higday and Collins Blocks (1886–1888), LaPorte County Courthouse (1890–1894), Odd Fellows Building (1895), Lonn's Block (1889), People's Bank (1912), U.S. Post Office (1912), New York Central Depot (1909), Masonic Temple (1910), and Hotel Rumely (1912).

It was listed in the National Register of Historic Places in 1983.

== History ==
The Downtown LaPorte Historic District reflects the development of LaPorte from a small town into a major manufacturing center La Porte was settled in 1830 and platted in 1833. With the arrival of the railroad in the 1850s, which first spurred the development of the business district. Among the earliest extant buildings in the district are the Zahrt Blocks built in 1874 and 1868, and the Ridgway Hotel built in 1863. These Italianate buildings are examples of the two-and three-story brick commercial buildings, which lined La Porte's downtown area. Common arch architectural details if the Italianate include: pressed metal cornices and window hoods, and storefronts with cast-iron columns. The downtown area occupies the location where two pre-European trails met. The number of lakes and wetlands to the north forced the town to firmer ground. The railroads arrived in the 1850s reinforcing development south of the lakes. Industrial growth was the main source of jobs until after World War I. The downtown reflects the legacy of commercial and civic history. Many of the structures have three stories: ground floor commercial with upper floors a combination of professional and residential use. The earliest buildings were constructed between the Civil War and the Panic of 1873. The Zahrt blocks (607–609 Michigan Avenue), constructed in 1868 and 1874, respectively, were purchased on speculation and resold to the developer. The tin brackets at the cornice and tin window hoods suggest a showiness that belies the buildings' otherwise severe and simple lines. The interiors are simple and lack any extravagance, indicating that the worth of the land was perceived to be rapidly escalating. In fact, other buildings like these were demolished and replaced with taller buildings as early as 1890. Another example of this type of development is the former Ridgway Hotel (401 Michigan), which was constructed in 1863. Its boxy mass is relieved with the use of window hoods, an elaborate cornice, and oriel windows. The structures along the 800 block of Lincolnway (810-20 Lincolnway) and those of the 700 block of Lincolnway follow this same design—consistent cornice lines, sparse Italianate detailing with window hoods, and boxy massing. This was the norm throughout the 1870s. Many of these early commercial buildings were replaced during the late nineteenth century. The focal point of the district, the La Porte County Courthouse, was constructed between 1890 and 1894. This Richardsonian Romanesque building was designed by Brentwood Tolan, who also designed other Indiana county courthouses. Many of the commercial buildings constructed during this period-exhibited ornate facades reflecting the owners' prospering businesses. The Lonn Block, the Ridgway Block, the Frederickson Building and the Guggenheim-Weil Building all prominently displayed the businessmen's names and the construction dates on their facades. Major buildings such as the city's post office, the train depot, and the Masonic Temple reflected a thriving economy. Commercial buildings such as the Hotel Rumely, the Peoples' Trust Savings Bank, the commercial building at 711 Indiana Avenue, and the Rumely Company Showroom were also built during this era.

== Significant buildings ==
Washington Street.

- 713–715 Industrial Building; Twentieth Century Functional, c. 1910 (N)
- 801 New York Central Depot; Prairie, 1909 (O)

State Street.

- 801 La Porte Journal Building; Italianate c. 1855/c. 1895 (N)

Lincolnway.

- 509 Everly Building; Neo-Classical, c. 1910 (C)
- 604 Commercial Building; Nineteenth Century Functional, c. 1895 (N)
- 606 Simon Building; Twentieth Century Functional, c. 1910 (N)
- 610 Commercial Building; Italianate, c. 1885 (N)
- 703–707 Ridgway Block; Queen Anne, 1889 (N)
- 715- Commercial Building; Italianate, 719 c. 1880 (N)
- 716 Guggenheim-Weil Building; Nineteenth Century Functional, 1871 (N)
- 721 Commercial Building; Italianate, c. 1885 (N)
- 801 La Porte County Courthouse; Richardsonian Romanesque, 1890–1894; Architect: Brentwood Tolan (O) HABS
- 810 Commercial Building; Queen Anne, c. 1885 (N)
- 910 Frederickson Building; Romanesque Revival, c. 1895 (N)
- 912 Peoples' Trust Savings Bank; Neo-Classical, 1912 In the commercial district, Alien redesigned the facade of a former typical storefront and created the People's Bank. The band is a typical "Greek temple bank" of limestone. What makes it special is that Alien imposed the facade on an otherwise flat surface. The combination of a projecting pediment and a receding arch make the entrance imposing and seemingly larger than its neighbors. Despite the addition of nonconforming display cases in the front, this facade is one of the best of its kind anywhere in the area. With the maturing of land values at the turn of the century, owners of existing structures improved them with new facades. LaPorte architect George Alien designed a number of homes for wealthy clients and was facile in a number of different styles. His major commissions included the Methodist Church (neo-Gothic), LaPorte High School (eclectic) and several large homes along Indiana and Michigan Avenues (Classic Revival and Prairie School).
- 915–921 Lonn Block; Queen Anne, 1889 (N) Demolished Fall 1988
- 916 Commercial Building; Contemporary, c. 1980 (NC)
- 920 Commercial Building; Contemporary, c. 1955 (NC)
- 1001 Historical Marker; Marks the site of the Meinrad Rumsley Blacksmith Shop, 1853 (N)
- 1002 Commercial Building; Romanesque Revival, 1906 (N)
- 1006 Commercial Building; Neo-Classical, c. 1905 (N)
- 1008 Commercial Building; Italianate, c. 1880 (N)
- 1010 Commercial Building; Twentieth Century Functional, 1914 (N)
- 1114–1116 Commercial Building; Twentieth Century Functional, c. 1915 (N)

Jefferson Avenue.

- 820 Masonic Temple; Neo-Classical, 1913 (O) The Masonic Lodge has exquisite stained glass.

Maple Avenue.

- 805 La Porte Library; Romanesque Revival/Tudor Revival, 1876/c. 1925 (O)

Indiana Avenue.

- 612–614 Commercial Building; Italianate, c. 1880 (N)
- 711 Commercial Building; Neo-Classical, 1905 (N)
- 807 Commercial Building; Twentieth Century Functional, c. 1910 (N)
- 809 House/Commercial Building; Italianate, c. 1890 (N)

Michigan Avenue.

- 401 Ridgway Hotel; Italianate, 1863 (O)
- 519 Rumely Company Showroom; Twentieth Century Functional, c. 1910 (N)
- 601 Commercial Building; Queen Anne, c. 1885 (N)
- 605 Mayes Building; Neo-Classical, c. 1905 (N)
- 607 Zahrt Block; Italianate, 1868 (N)
- 609 Zahrt Block; Italianate, 1874 (N)
- 617 Commercial Building; Queen Anne, 1893 (N)
- 717 Odd Fellows Hall – Odd Fellows ballroom features Second Empire details
- 800 Hotel Rumely; Renaissance Revival, 1912 (O)

Monroe Avenue.

- 601–607 Commercial Building; Twentieth Century Functional, c. 1915 (N)
- 612 Commercial Building; Queen Anne, c. 1895 (N)
- 809 Commercial Building; Indeterminate, c. 1885 (N)
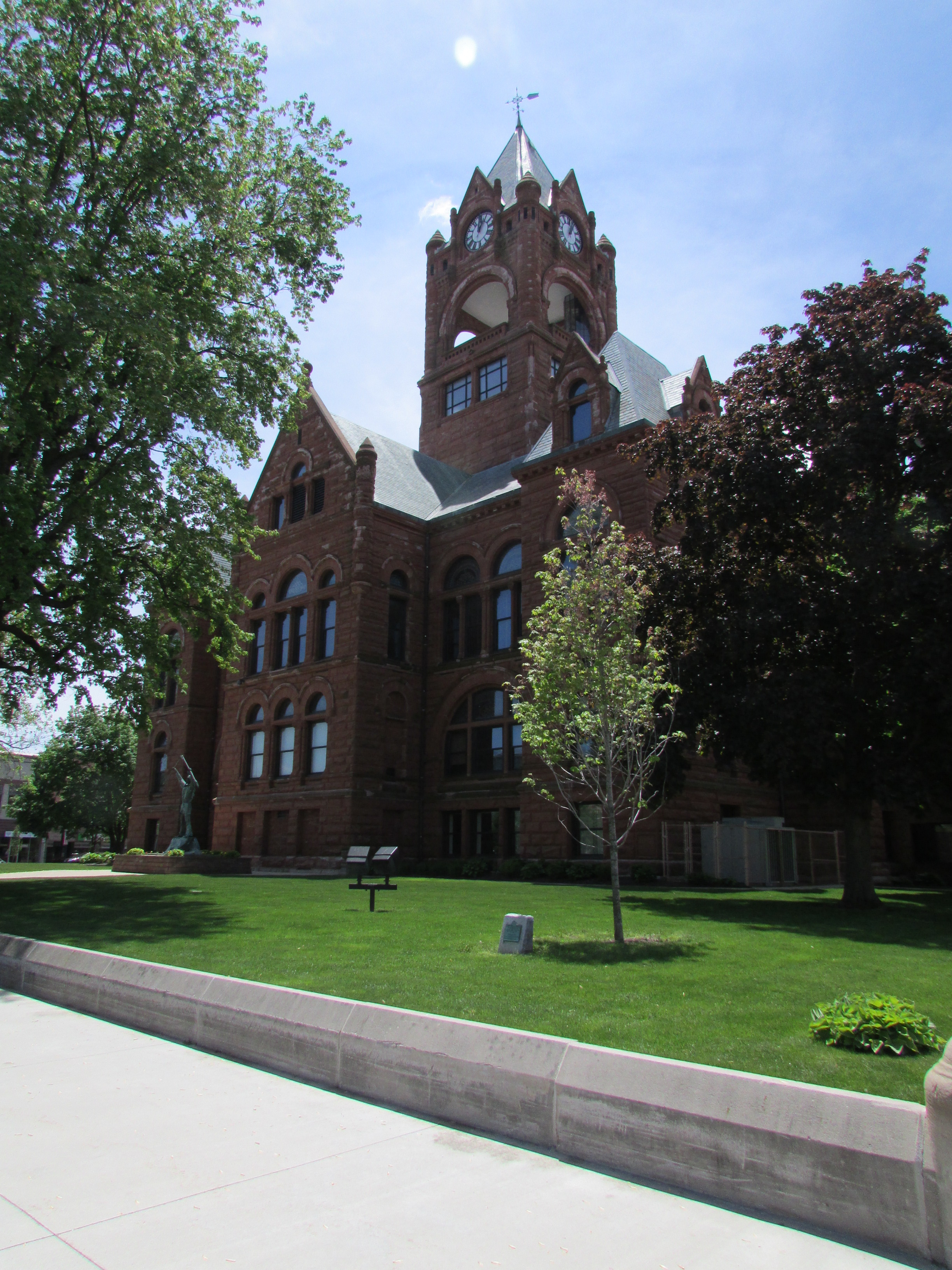
La Porte County Courthouse from down Lincolnway.

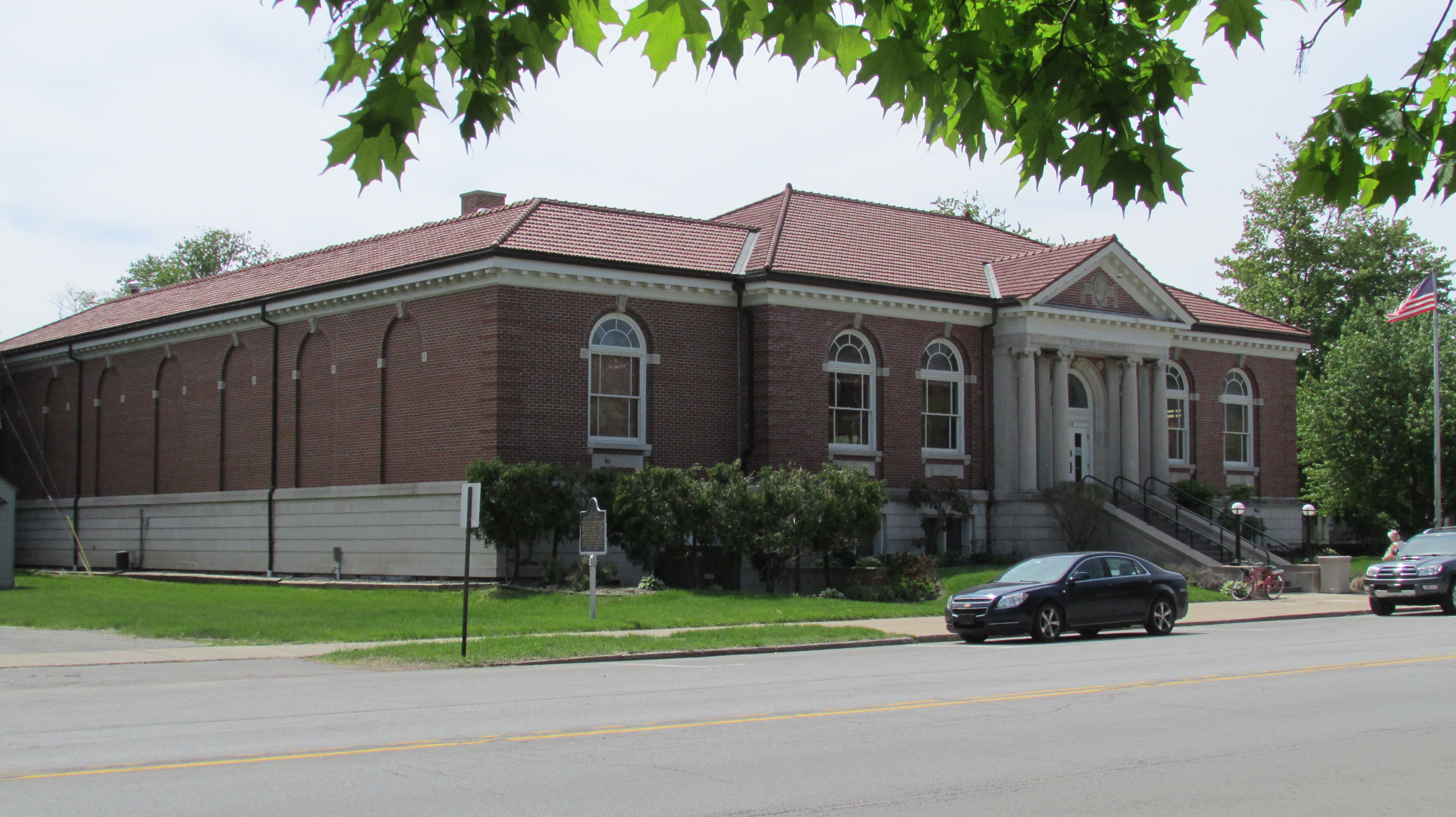
La Porte Carnegie Library, 905 Indiana Ave, part of the Downtown LaPorte Historic District.

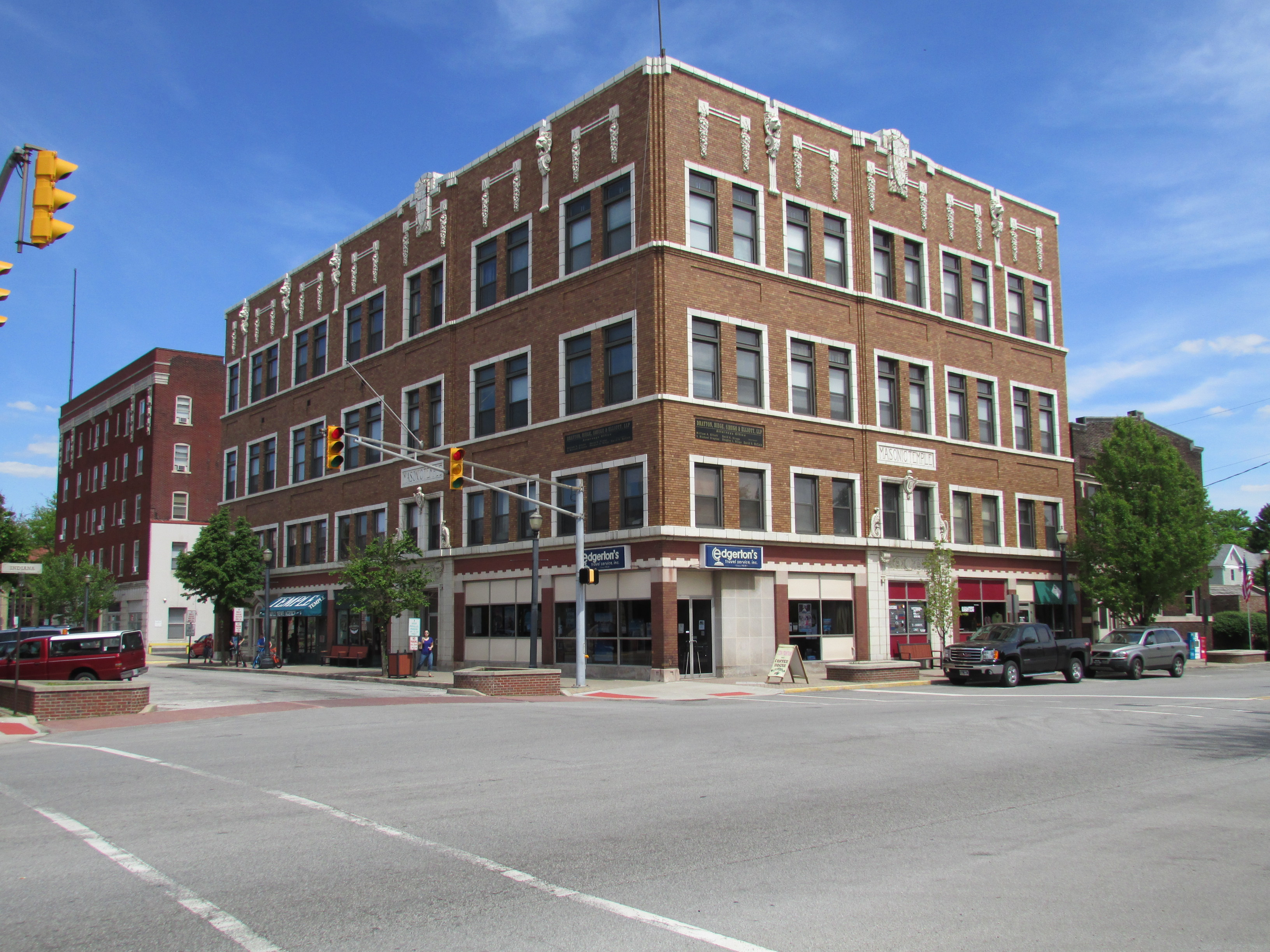
Masonic Hall, 801 Jefferson, La Porte, Indiana, part of the Downtown LaPorte Historic District.
