= LaGrange, Indiana =

LaGrange
- Town
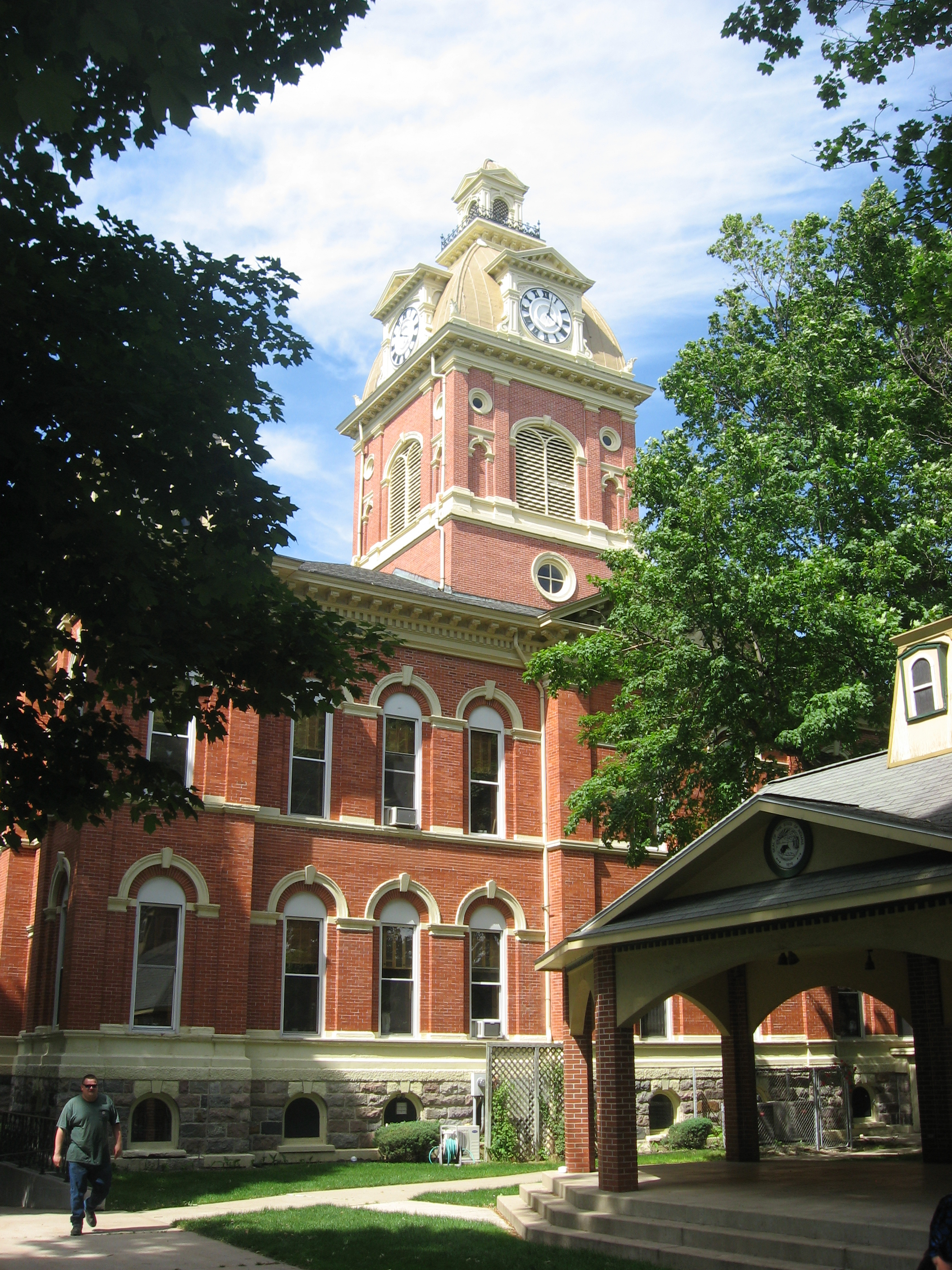
- LaGrange County Courthouse

- Seal

- Location of Lagrange in LaGrange County, Indiana.
- Coordinates: 41°38′53″N 85°25′05″W
- Country: United States
- State: Indiana
- County: LaGrange

Area
  - Total: 1.78 sq mi (4.62 km^{2})
  - Land: 1.78 sq mi (4.62 km^{2})
  - Water: 0 sq mi (0.00 km^{2})
- Elevation: 919 ft (280 m)

Population (2020)
  - Total: 2,715
  - Density: 1,520.5/sq mi (587.08/km^{2})
- Time zone: UTC-5 (EST)
  - Summer (DST): UTC-5 (EST)
- ZIP code: 46761
- Area code: 260
- FIPS code: 18-40860
- GNIS feature ID: 2396703
- Website: www.in.gov/towns/lagrange/

LaGrange is a town in and the county seat of LaGrange County, Indiana, United States. The population was 2,625 at the 2010 census.

== History ==
LaGrange was laid out and platted in 1836. It took its name from LaGrange County.

LaGrange County's initial settlers were Yankee immigrants, that is to say they were from New England and were descended from the English Puritans who settled that region in the colonial era. They were part of a wave of New England settlers moving west into what was then the Northwest Territory after the completion of the Erie Canal. The original settlers in LaGrange County specifically hailed from the Massachusetts counties of Worcester County, Suffolk County and Berkshire County; the Connecticut counties of Hartford County and Windham County as well as the Connecticut towns of Sherman, Lebanon and Fairfield; and from the Vermont towns of Burlington, Brookfield, Huntington and Grand Isle. They were mainly members of the Congregational Church, but as a result of the Second Great Awakening many became Baptists and many also converted to Pentecostalism and Methodism. When they arrived in what is now LaGrange County, there was nothing but virgin forest and wild prairie, the New England settlers cleared roads, built farms, constructed churches, erected government buildings, and established post routes. As a result of this migration, LaGrange County was culturally continuous with early New England culture for many years.

The LaGrange County Courthouse was listed on the National Register of Historic Places in 1980. The courthouse and the annual fall festival are featured in the 1941 New Deal era post office mural painted by Jessie Hull Mayer. She won the federal commission to paint Corn School as part of the Section of Painting and Sculpture′s projects, later called the Section of Fine Arts, of the Treasury Department.

== Geography ==
According to the 2010 census, LaGrange has a total area of 1.7 square miles (4.40 km^{2}), all land.

== Demographics ==
Historical population
Census	Pop.	Note	%±
1860	650		—
1870	1,038		59.7%
1880	1,367		31.7%
1890	1,784		30.5%
1900	1,703		−4.5%
1910	1,772		4.1%
1920	1,610		−9.1%
1930	1,640		1.9%
1940	1,814		10.6%
1950	1,892		4.3%
1960	1,990		5.2%
1970	2,053		3.2%
1980	2,164		5.4%
1990	2,382		10.1%
2000	2,919		22.5%
2010	2,625		−10.1%
2020	2,715		3.4%
U.S. Decennial Census

=== 2020 census ===
As of the census of 2020, there were 2,715 people, 1,143 households, and 687 families living in the town.

=== 2010 census ===
As of the census of 2010, there were 2,625 people, 1,041 households, and 637 families living in the town. The population density was 1,544.1 inhabitants per square mile (596.2/km^{2}). There were 1,221 housing units at an average density of 718.2 per square mile (277.3/km^{2}). The racial makeup of the town was 93.7% White, 0.6% African American, 0.4% Native American, 0.4% Asian, 4.2% from other races, and 0.7% from two or more races. Hispanic or Latino of any race were 9.5% of the population.

There were 1,041 households, of which 33.5% had children under the age of 18 living with them, 43.2% were married couples living together, 13.3% had a female householder with no husband present, 4.7% had a male householder with no wife present, and 38.8% were non-families. 34.3% of all households were made up of individuals, and 15.3% had someone living alone who was 65 years of age or older. The average household size was 2.43 and the average family size was 3.17.

The median age in the town was 37.7 years. 27% of residents were under the age of 18; 7.5% were between the ages of 18 and 24; 24.6% were from 25 to 44; 22.9% were from 45 to 64; and 17.8% were 65 years of age or older. The gender makeup of the town was 46.7% male and 53.3% female.

=== 2000 census ===
As of the census of 2000, there were 2,919 people, 1,149 households, and 716 families living in the town. The population density was 1,717.8 inhabitants per square mile (663.2/km^{2}). There were 1,231 housing units at an average density of 724.4 per square mile (279.7/km^{2}). The racial makeup of the town was 93.32% White, 0.38% African American, 0.03% Native American, 0.48% Asian, 4.69% from other races, and 1.10% from two or more races. Hispanic or Latino of any race were 6.89% of the population.

There were 1,149 households, out of which 32.6% had children under the age of 18 living with them, 46.0% were married couples living together, 12.6% had a female householder with no husband present, and 37.6% were non-families. 32.6% of all households were made up of individuals, and 15.2% had someone living alone who was 65 years of age or older. The average household size was 2.42 and the average family size was 3.08.

In the town, the population was spread out, with 26.6% under the age of 18, 10.0% from 18 to 24, 27.2% from 25 to 44, 19.6% from 45 to 64, and 16.6% who were 65 years of age or older. The median age was 35 years. For every 100 females, there were 92.9 males. For every 100 females age 18 and over, there were 82.6 males.

The median income for a household in the town was $32,054, and the median income for a family was $39,038. Males had a median income of $29,545 versus $21,946 for females. The per capita income for the town was $17,865. About 4.7% of families and 7.1% of the population were below the poverty line, including 5.7% of those under age 18 and 9.7% of those age 65 or over.

== Courthouse ==
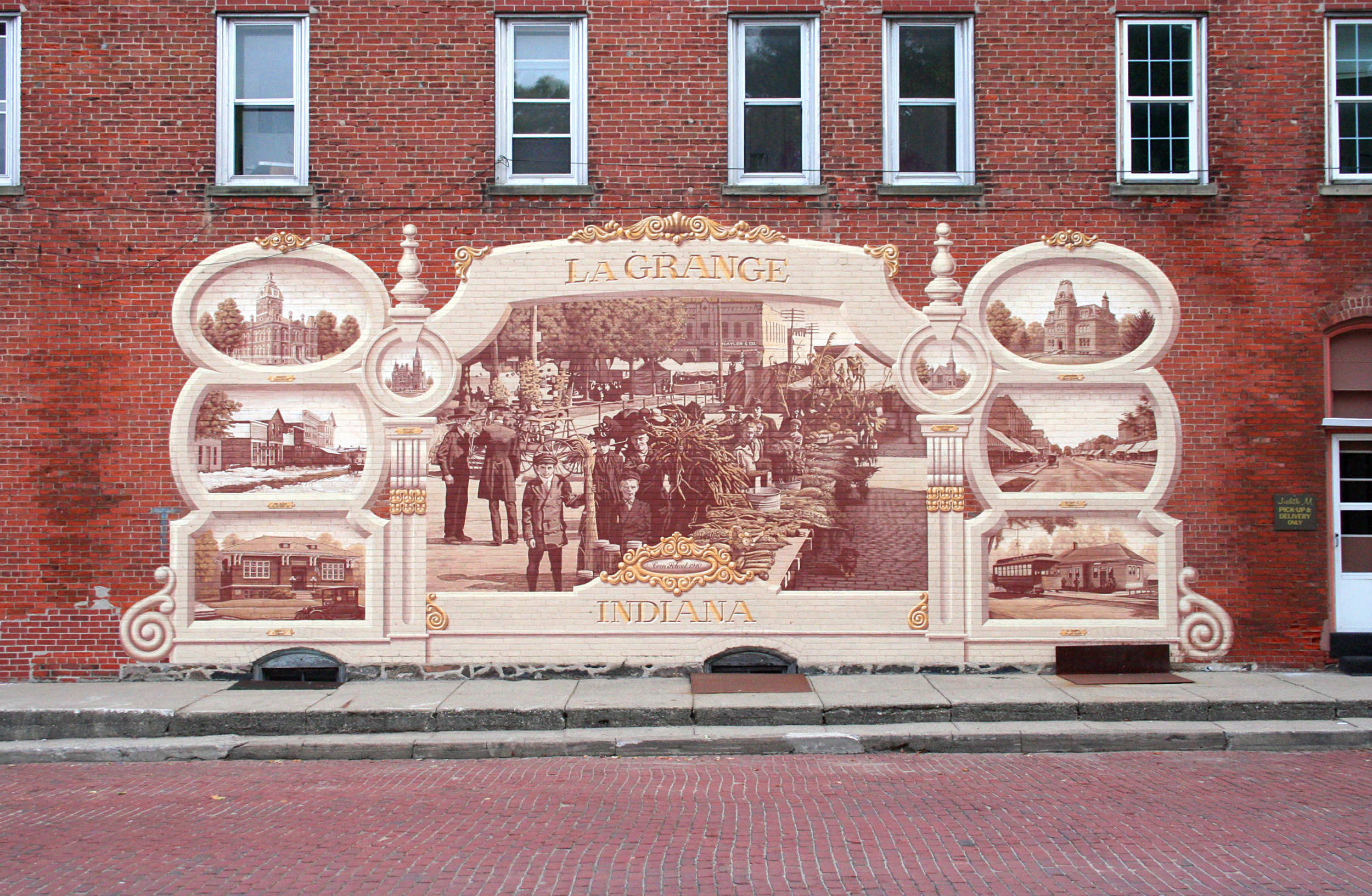
Mural of LaGrange's history, downtown.

The LaGrange County Courthouse was designed in 1878 by Thomas J. Tolan, & Son, Architects, of Fort Wayne, Indiana. The courthouse was listed on the National Register of Historic Places on July 17, 1980.

== Transportation ==
LaGrange is served by Barons Bus Lines Schedule 0025: Cleveland, Ohio to Chicago, Illinois; and Schedule 0026: Chicago, Illinois to Cleveland, Ohio. Both routes feature local service via primarily US Route 20. These routes are an essential transportation service sharing similarities to that of the Essential Air Service, primarily funded by tax payers.

== Education ==
The town of LaGrange lies in the school district of Lakeland School Corporation. The local schools town residents attend are:

- Lakeland Primary School
- Lakeland Intermediate School
- Lakeland Jr./Sr. High School

LaGrange has a public library, a branch of the La Grange County Public Library.

The former LaGrange High School was built in 1877 and graduated its last high school class in 1964. It continued as a school for grades 4 through 9 until 1978, closing after 100 years. Soon after, the building was torn down.

== Communications ==
LaGrange has only two numbered state or federal highways: U.S. Route 20 and State Road 9. It is seven miles away from the Howe-LaGrange interchange of the Indiana Toll Road. It has no scheduled airline or passenger rail service.

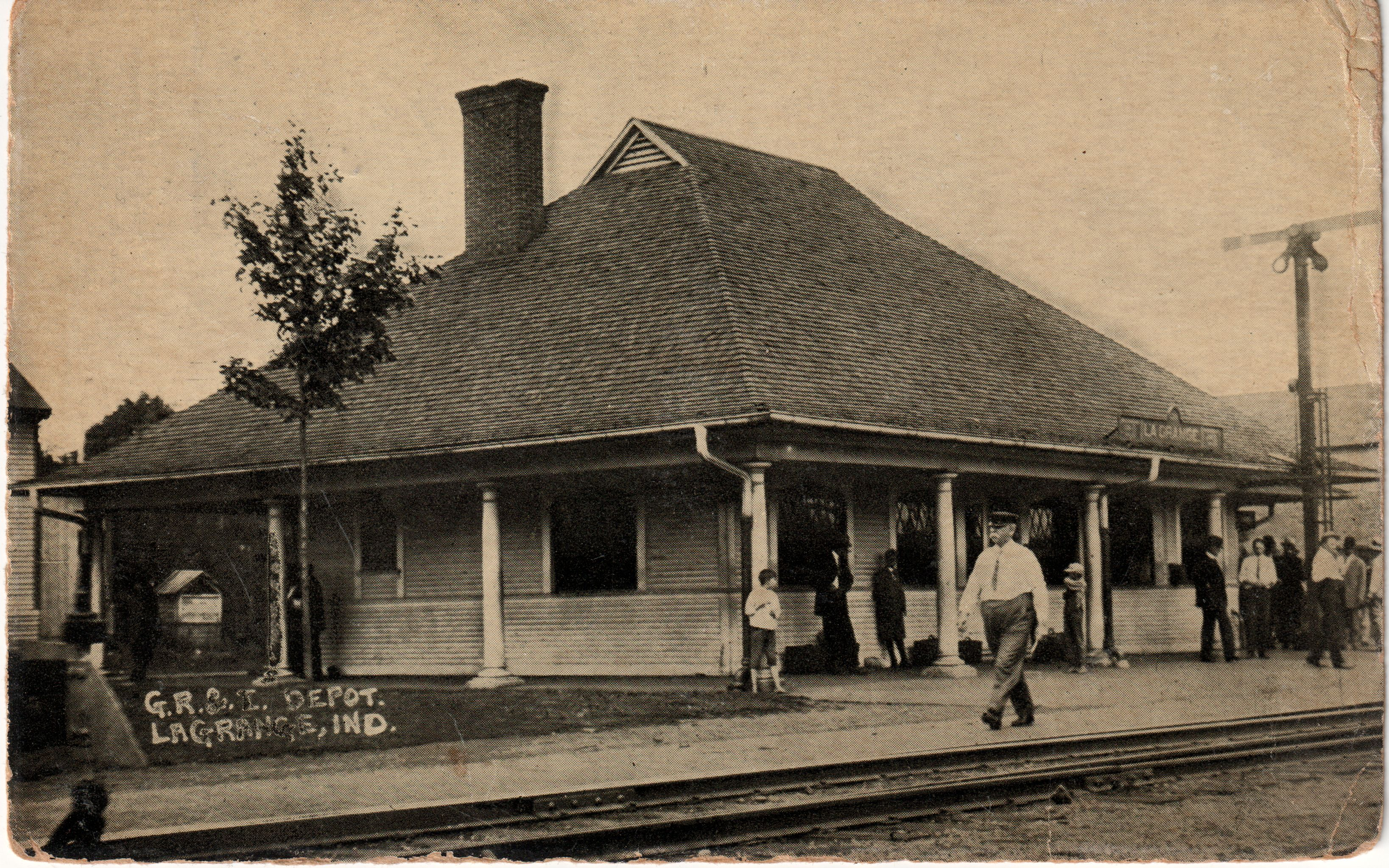
Former train station in LaGrange, Indiana in 1915

LaGrange is within the Michiana television market.

== Culture ==
LaGrange has a number of geocaches, wooded trails, and athletic parks, including a skate-park.
