= Whitley County Courthouse (Indiana) =

- U.S. National Register of Historic Places
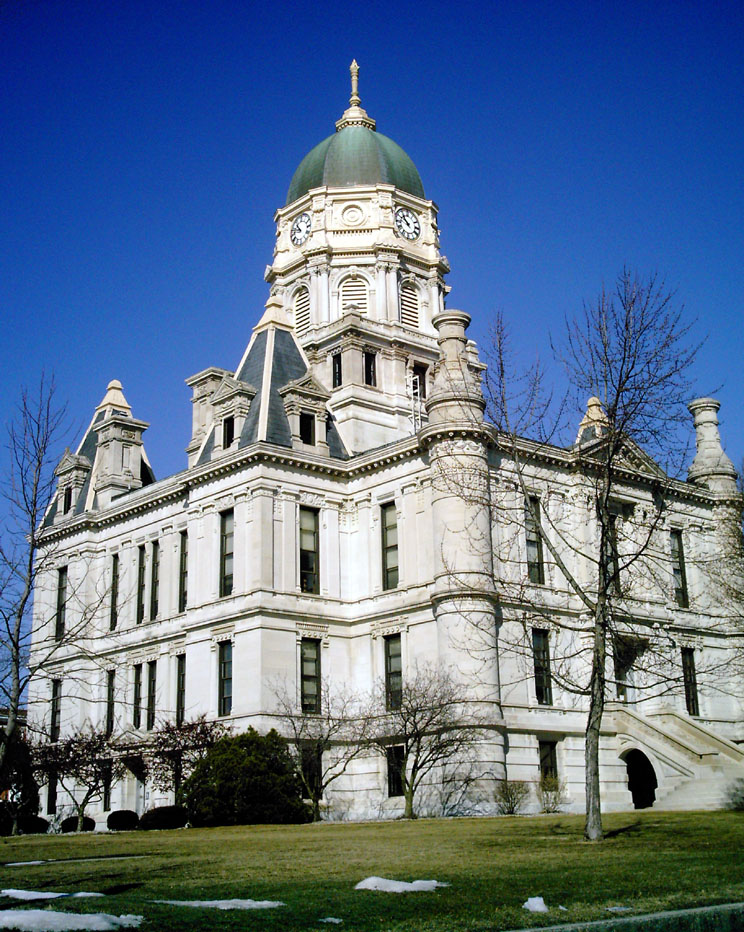

- Location within Indiana Location within the United States
- Location: Van Buren and Main Sts., Columbia City, Indiana
- Coordinates: 41°9′23″N 85°29′21″W
- Area: 4 acres (1.6 ha)
- Built: 1888
- Architect: Tolan, Brentwood S.
- Architectural style: Renaissance, French Renaissance
- NRHP reference No.: 79000029
- Added to NRHP: February 16, 1979

The Whitley County Courthouse is an historic courthouse building located at Van Buren and Main Streets in Columbia City, Indiana, the seat of Whitley County. It was constructed in 1888, and is a three-story, cruciform plan, French Renaissance style Indiana limestone building designed by Brentwood S. Tolan. It has a slate roof and galvanized iron central dome.

The courthouse was added to the National Register of Historic Places on February 16, 1979.

== Architecture ==
A variety of prominent art works stand out on the Courthouse. Heads in Relief is a collection of limestone animal and figurative heads that are carved in a relief above the courthouse doors. Sculpted by Giere, the center features the image of a woman, possibly Liberty (22 x 16 x 18) wearing an elaborate headdress. To her proper right is a goose-like bird with its beak open and to the proper left is a wolf-like animal also with an open mouth. These pieces were examined as part of the Smithsonian's Save Outdoor Sculpture! survey in 1993 and their condition was described as "undetermined."

== See also ==
- Columbia City, Indiana
- Whitley County, Indiana
