= Van Wert County Courthouse =

Local government building in the United States

- U.S. National Register of Historic Places
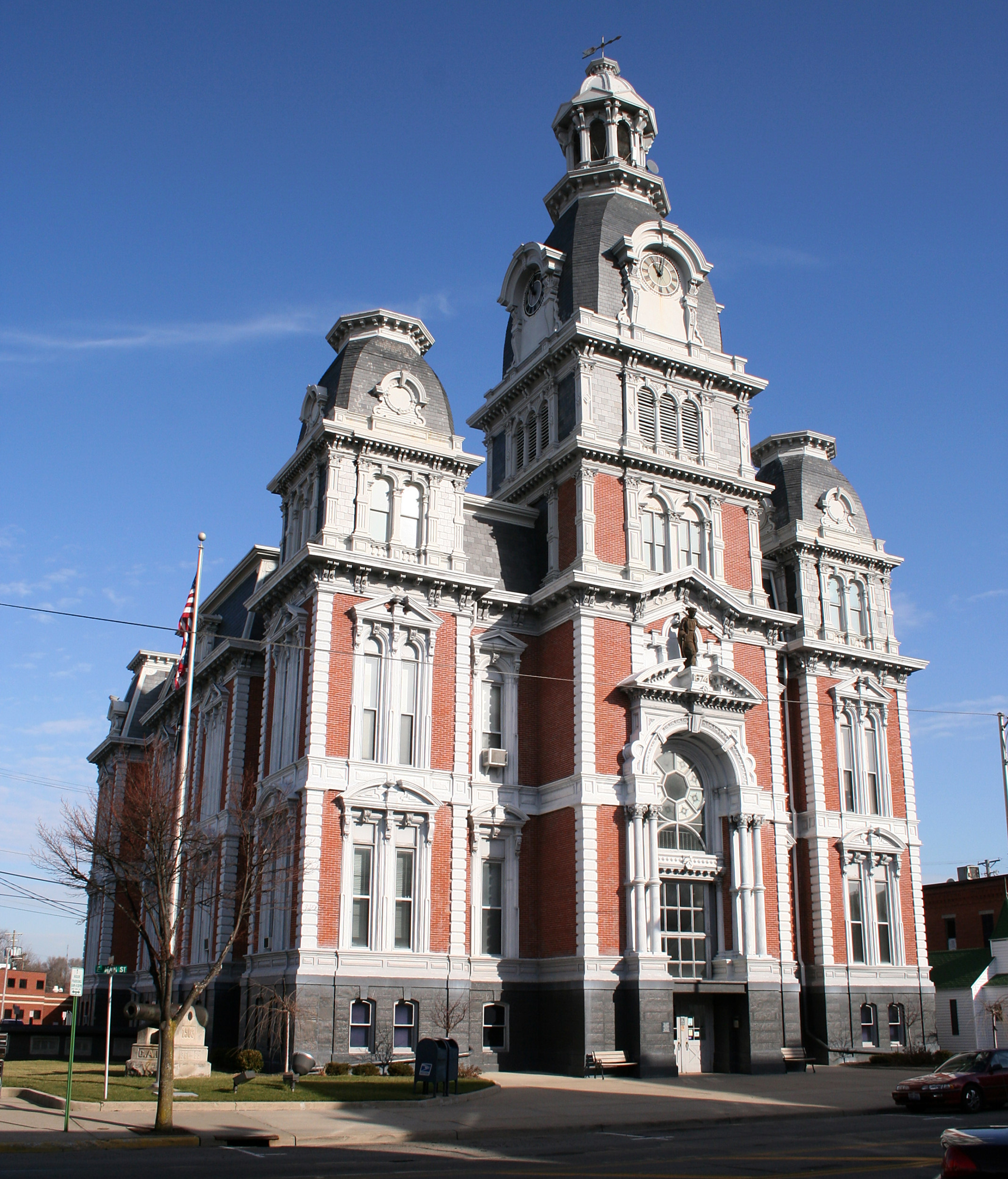
- Front and western side of the courthouse

- Location within Ohio Location within the United States
- Location: 121 E. Main St., Van Wert, Ohio
- Coordinates: 40°52′12″N 84°34′55″W
- Area: 1 acre (0.40 ha)
- Built: 1876
- Architect: T.J. Tolan
- Architectural style: Second Empire
- NRHP reference No.: 74001639
- Added to NRHP: July 30, 1974

The Van Wert County Courthouse is a historic governmental building in downtown Van Wert, Ohio, United States. Located at 121 E. Main Street, the courthouse is a Second Empire structure built in 1876. It is Van Wert County's third courthouse: when the county was established, the village of Willshire was designated the county seat; Van Wert was made the seat in 1838, and a courthouse-and-jail complex was built in that community in the following year.

Designed by T.J. Tolan, an architect from Fort Wayne, Indiana, the courthouse is a square structure with towers on all four corners. Its architecture combines copious amounts of brick and stone: the foundation and the walls of the first floor are stone, along with the pilasters, columns, and quoins on the upper parts of the exterior, while the walls of the remaining stories and of the tower are built of brick. Tolan employed multiple groundbreaking construction techniques throughout the structure, such as pressed steel; his success in using these innovations earned recognition for both him and the courthouse in a national trade journal. Rising above the front of the courthouse is a clock tower with a statue of Justice placed in a niche. Made of zinc, the statue is 8 feet (2.4 m) tall; before its installation at the courthouse, it was awarded first place in a Philadelphia sculpture competition.

Today, county officials continue to use the courthouse for everyday operations. Among the offices in the courthouse are those of the county treasurer, the county recorder, the county auditor, and the Van Wert County Common Pleas Court. Some other county agencies maintain offices in other locations, such as the county sheriff and the county commissioners.

In 1974, the Van Wert County Courthouse was listed on the National Register of Historic Places, becoming the first building in the county to receive this distinction. It qualified for inclusion because of its well-preserved historic architecture, which was seen as significant statewide.
