= LaGrange County Courthouse =

- U.S. National Register of Historic Places
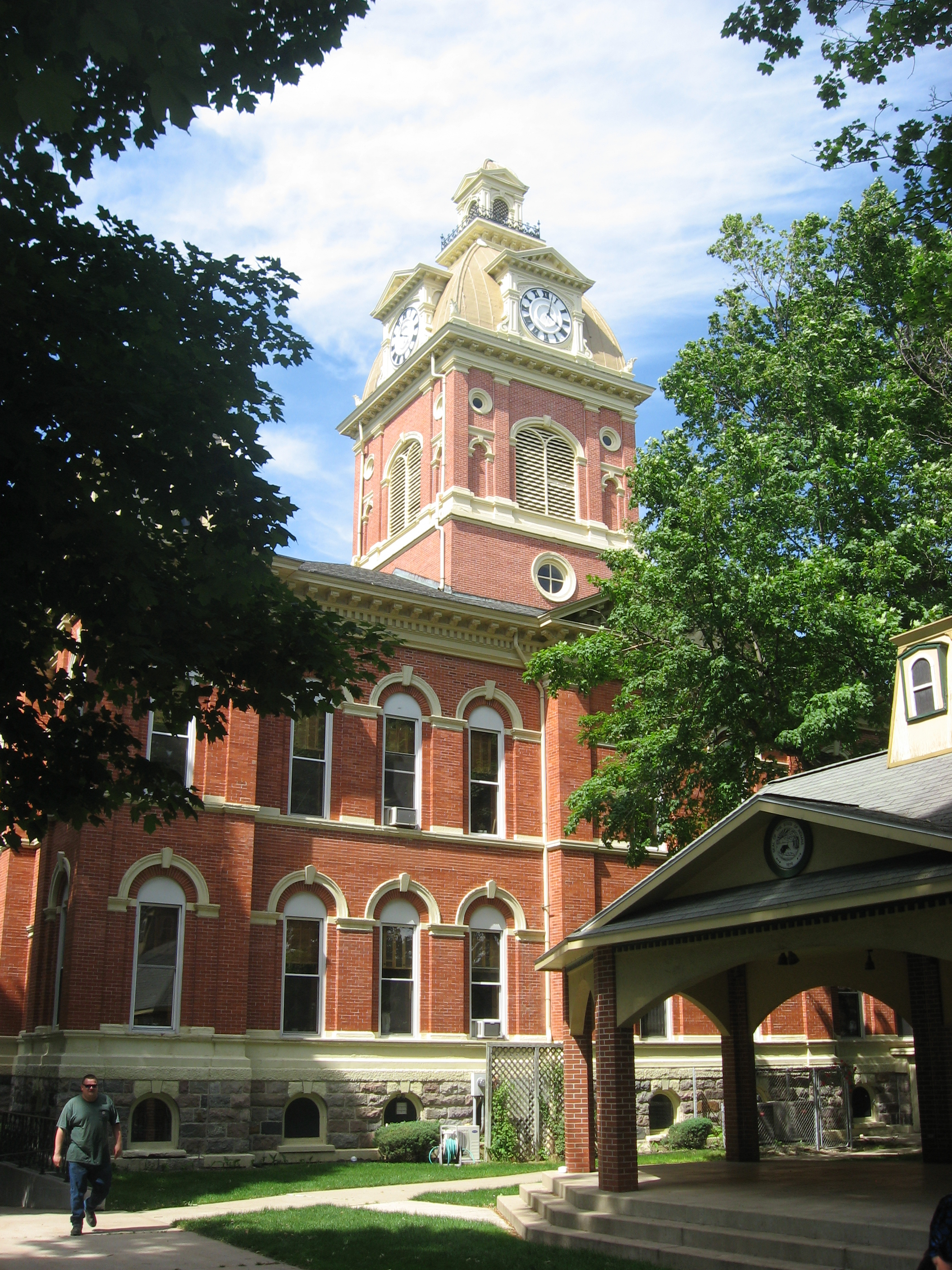
- LaGrange County Courthouse, May 2012

- Location within Indiana Location within the United States
- Interactive map showing the location of LaGrange County Courthouse
- Location: Detroit St., LaGrange, Indiana
- Coordinates: 41°38′40″N 85°25′7″W
- Area: 1.8 acres (0.73 ha)
- Built: 1878-1879
- Architect: Tolan, Thomas J., & Sons; Bosseker & Begue
- Architectural style: Second Empire, Georgian
- NRHP reference No.: 80000042
- Added to NRHP: July 17, 1980

LaGrange County Courthouse is a historic courthouse located on Detroit Street in LaGrange, Indiana. It was designed by Thomas J. Tolan, & Son, Architects of Fort Wayne, Indiana and built in 1878–1879. It is a two-story, rectangular red brick building with Second Empire and Georgian style design elements. The front facade consists of a central clock tower flanked by square corner pavilions.

It was added to the National Register of Historic Places on July 17, 1980.
