= Brentwood S. Tolan =

American architect

Brentwood S. Tolan (November 23, 1855 – June 30, 1923) was an American architect. His most notable works include the National Historic Landmark-designated Allen County Courthouse in downtown Fort Wayne, Indiana, the Whitley County Courthouse in Columbia City, Indiana, the La Porte County Courthouse in La Porte, Indiana, as well as the now-demolished Old National Bank Building and Masonic Temple and Opera House in Fort Wayne.

Tolan was born in Delphos, Ohio to Thomas J. and Harriet Skinner Tolan. With little formal art training, he apprenticed under his father, a marble craftsman-turned architect, starting in 1872 at age 17. In 1874, his father moved the family and architectural practice to Fort Wayne, Indiana.

After his father's death in 1883, Tolan continued the family architectural practice in Fort Wayne. He became well known during the Progressive Era in the Great Lakes area of the Midwest for designing municipal and local government buildings, including courthouses and jails. He later moved to Lima, Ohio, where he practiced with the firm DeCurtin, Rawson, and Tolan. He is buried in Delphos.

== National Register of Historic Places ==
T.J. Tolan & Son, Architects

- Davis County Courthouse, Bloomfield, Iowa (added May 3, 1974)
- Van Wert County Courthouse, Van Wert, Ohio (added July 30, 1974)
- Holmes County Sheriff's Residence and Jail, Millersburg, Ohio (added July 25, 1974)
- Morrow County Sheriff's Residence and Jail, Mount Gilead, Ohio (added July 25, 1974)
- La Grange County Courthouse, Lagrange, Indiana (added July 17, 1980)
- First United Methodist Church, Van Wert, Ohio (added 1982)
- Noble County Sheriff's Residence and Jail, Albion, Indiana (added December 27, 1982)
- Kosciusko County Courthouse, Warsaw, Indiana (added March 1, 1982)
- Parke County Courthouse, Rockville, Indiana (added May 27, 1993)
- McCulloch-Weatherhogg Double House, Fort Wayne, Indiana (added 2001)
- Henry County Courthouse, Cambridge, Illinois (added August 20, 2004)

Brentwood S. Tolan, Architect

- Allen County Courthouse, Fort Wayne, Indiana (added May 28, 1976)
- LaPorte County Courthouse, LaPorte, Indiana
- Whitley County Courthouse, Columbia City, Indiana

Decurtin, Rawson, and Tolan

- Argonne Hotel, Lima, Ohio (added October 7, 1982)

== National Historic Landmark ==
Brentwood S. Tolan, Architect

- Allen County Courthouse, Fort Wayne, Indiana (added July 31, 2003)

== Images ==
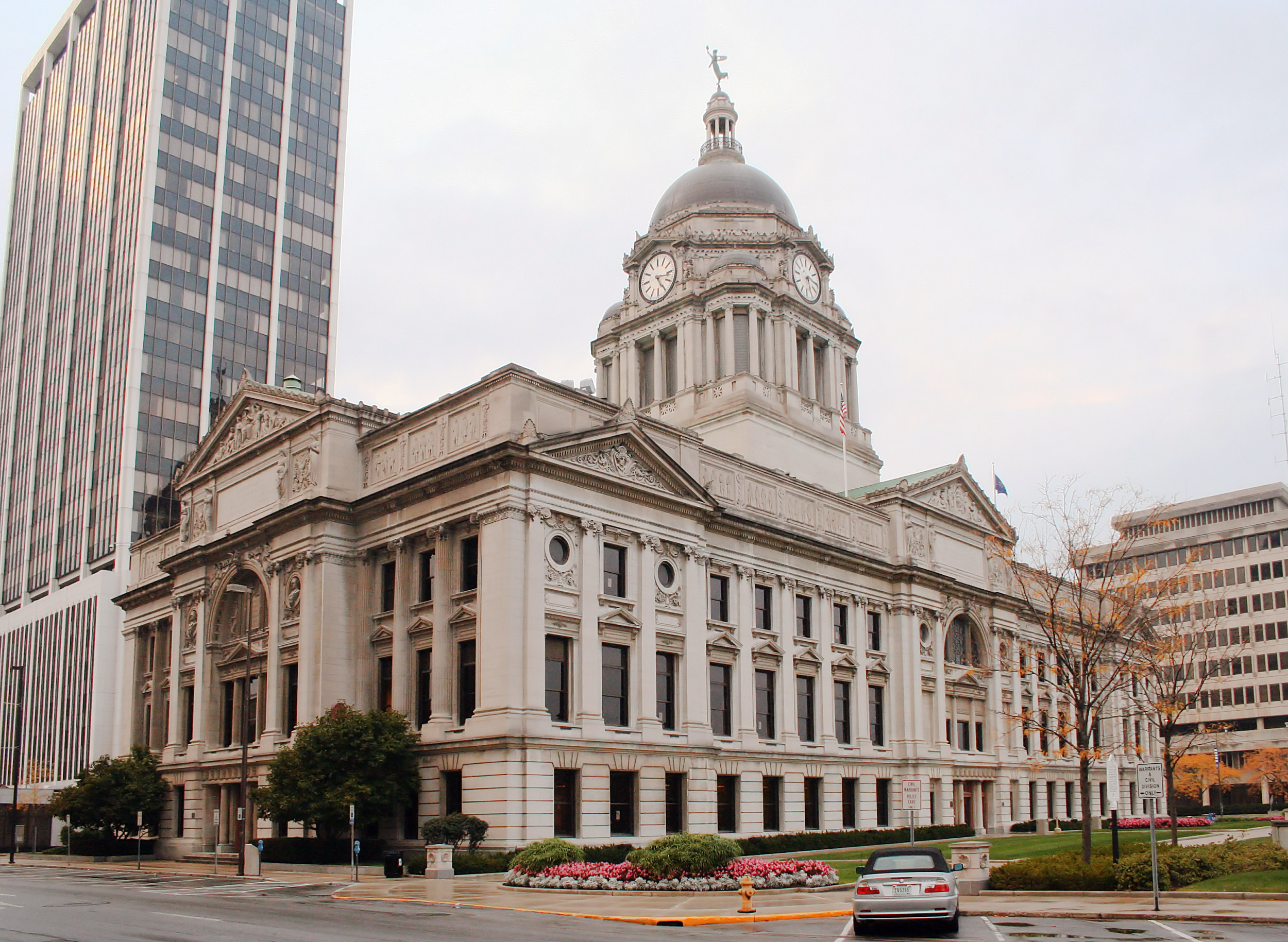
Allen County Courthouse, Fort Wayne, Indiana

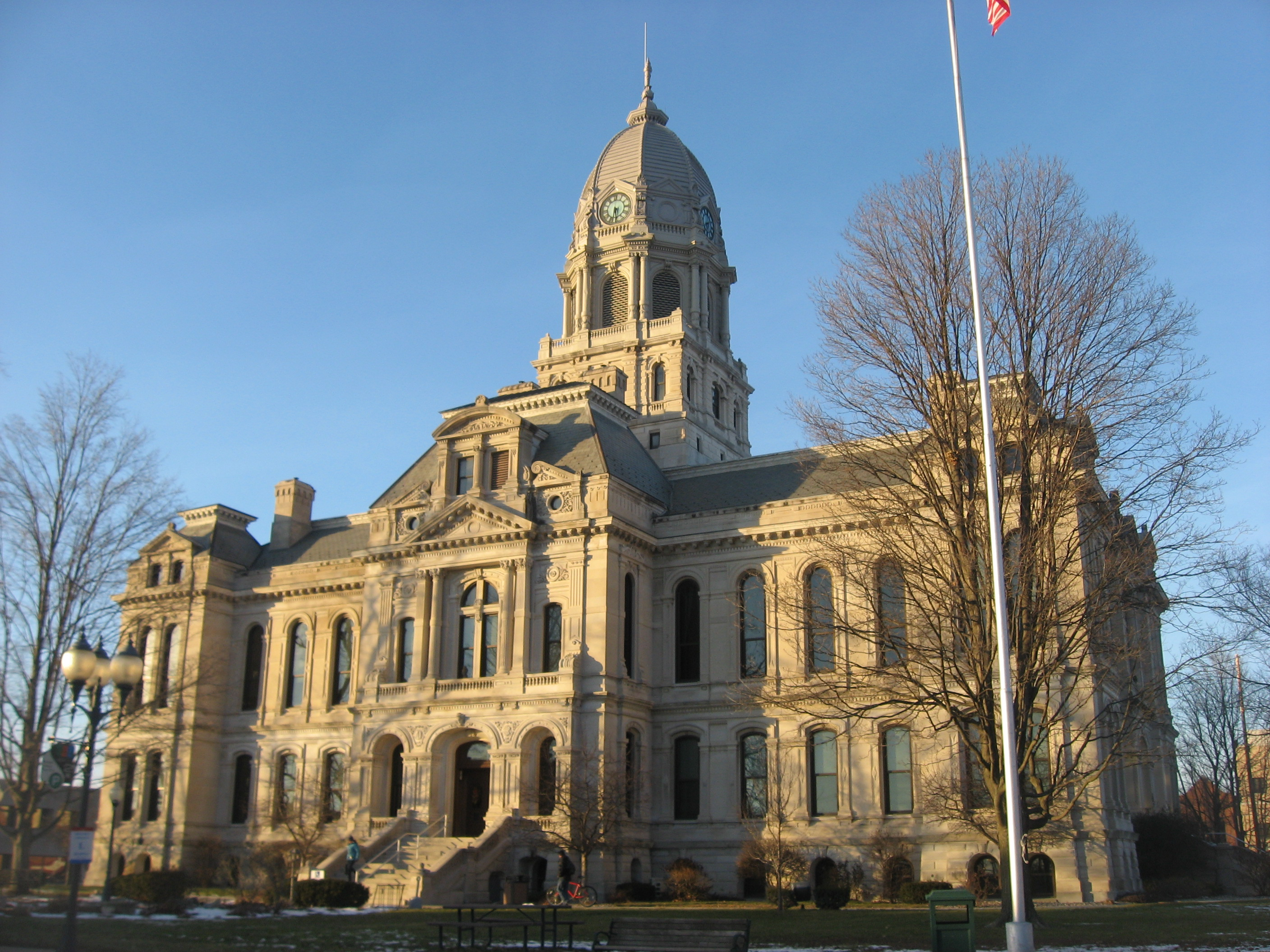
Kosciusko County Courthouse, Warsaw, Indiana

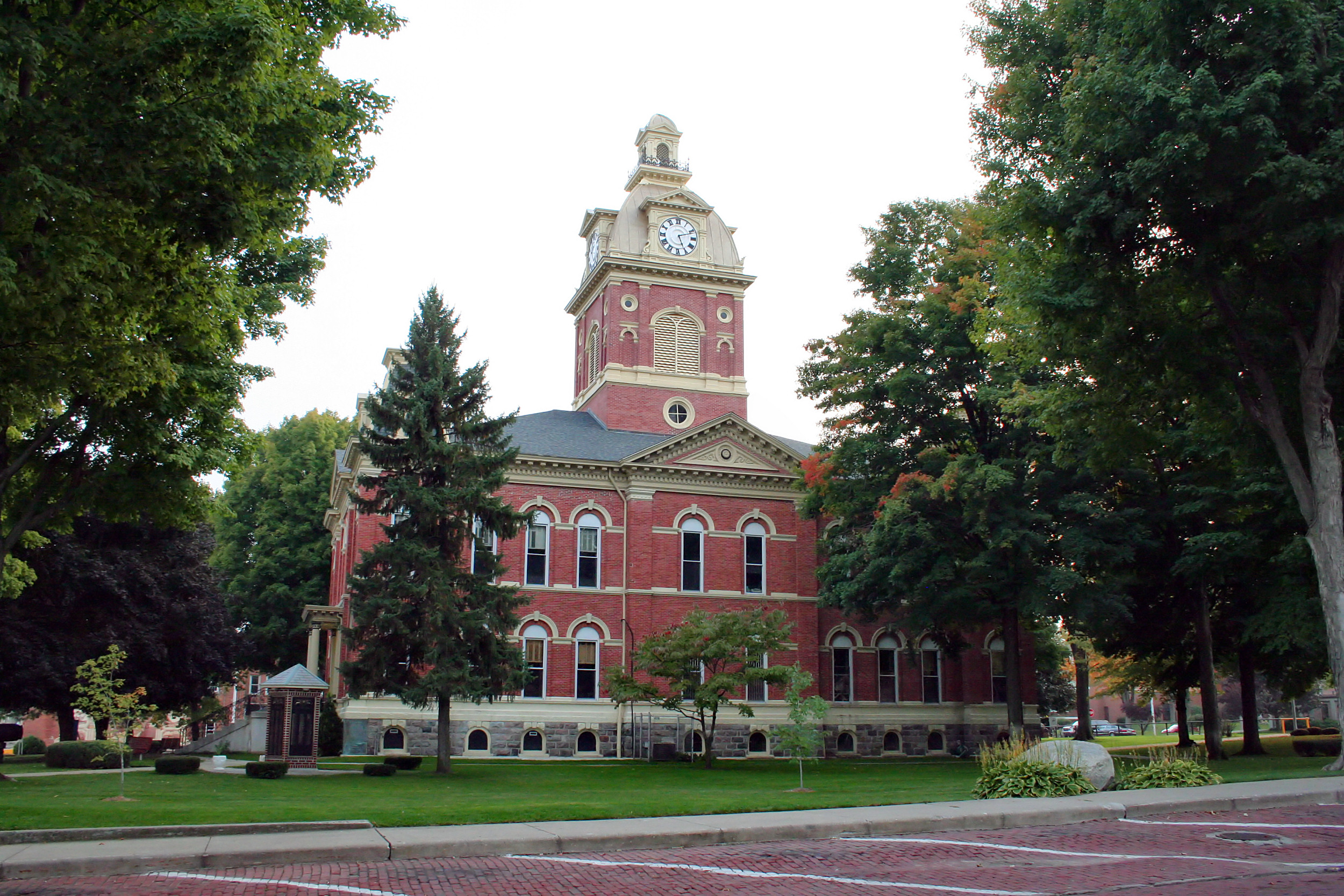
LaGrange County Courthouse, LaGrange, Indiana

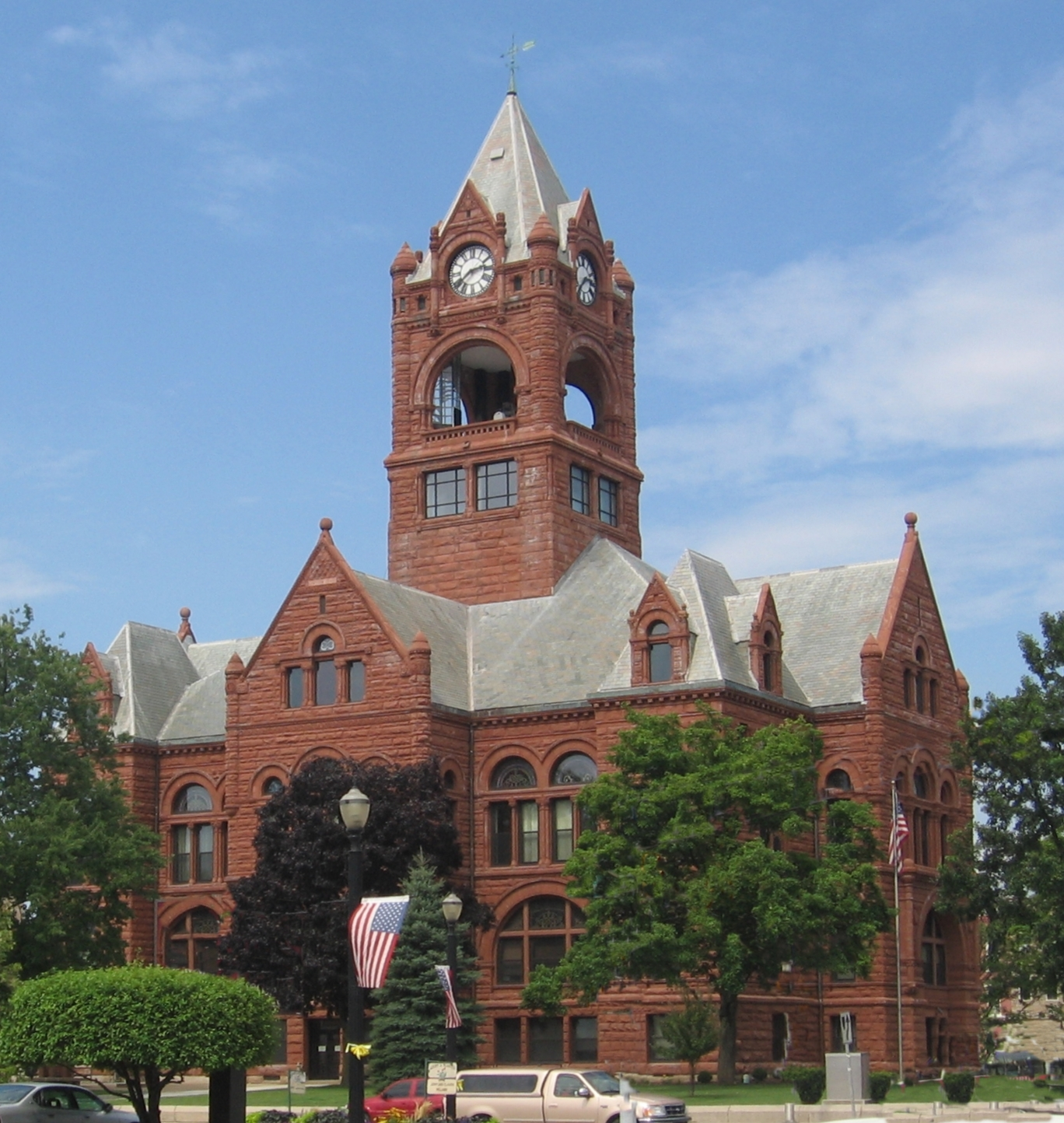
La Porte County Courthouse, La Porte, Indiana

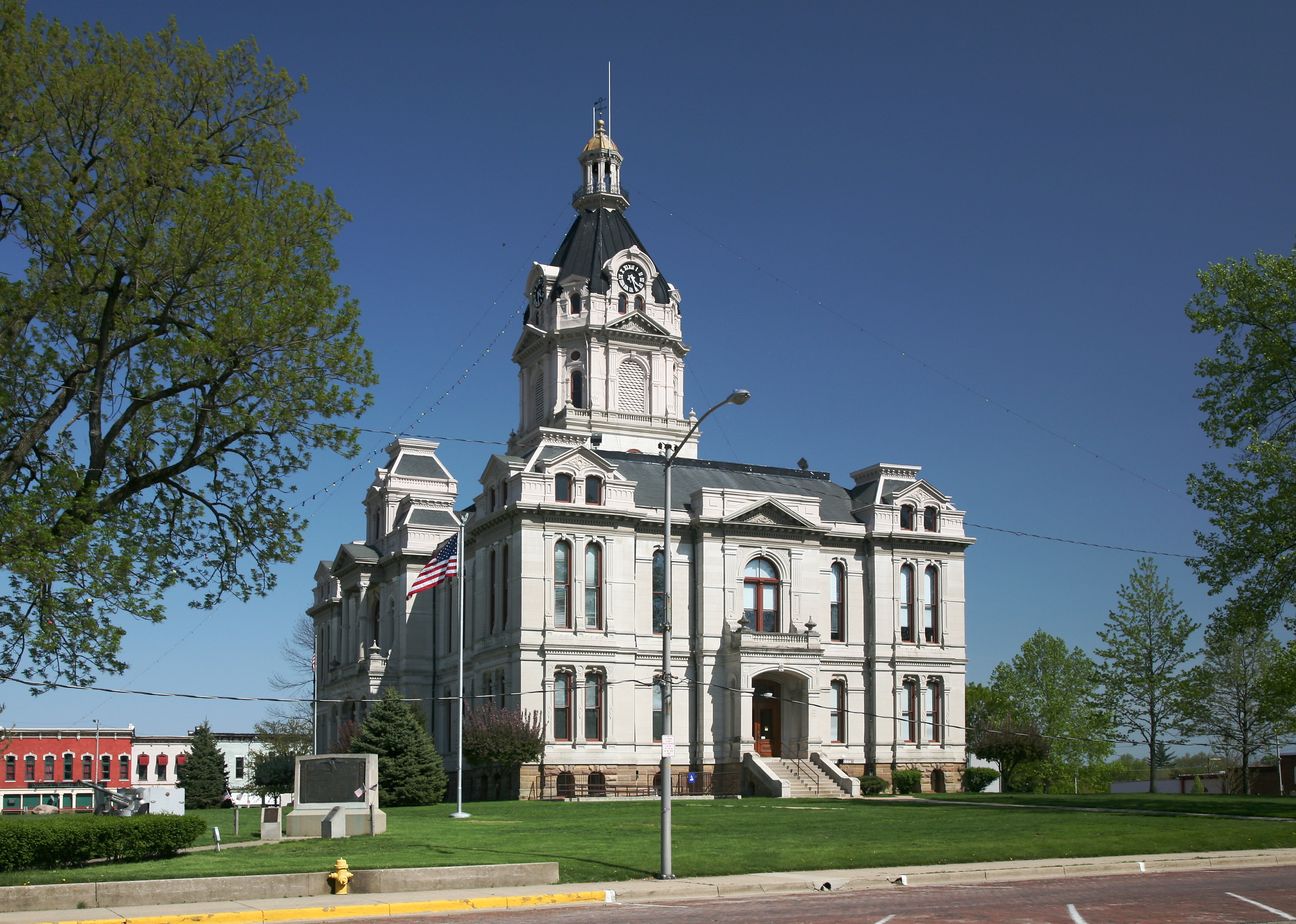
Parke County Courthouse, Rockville, Indiana

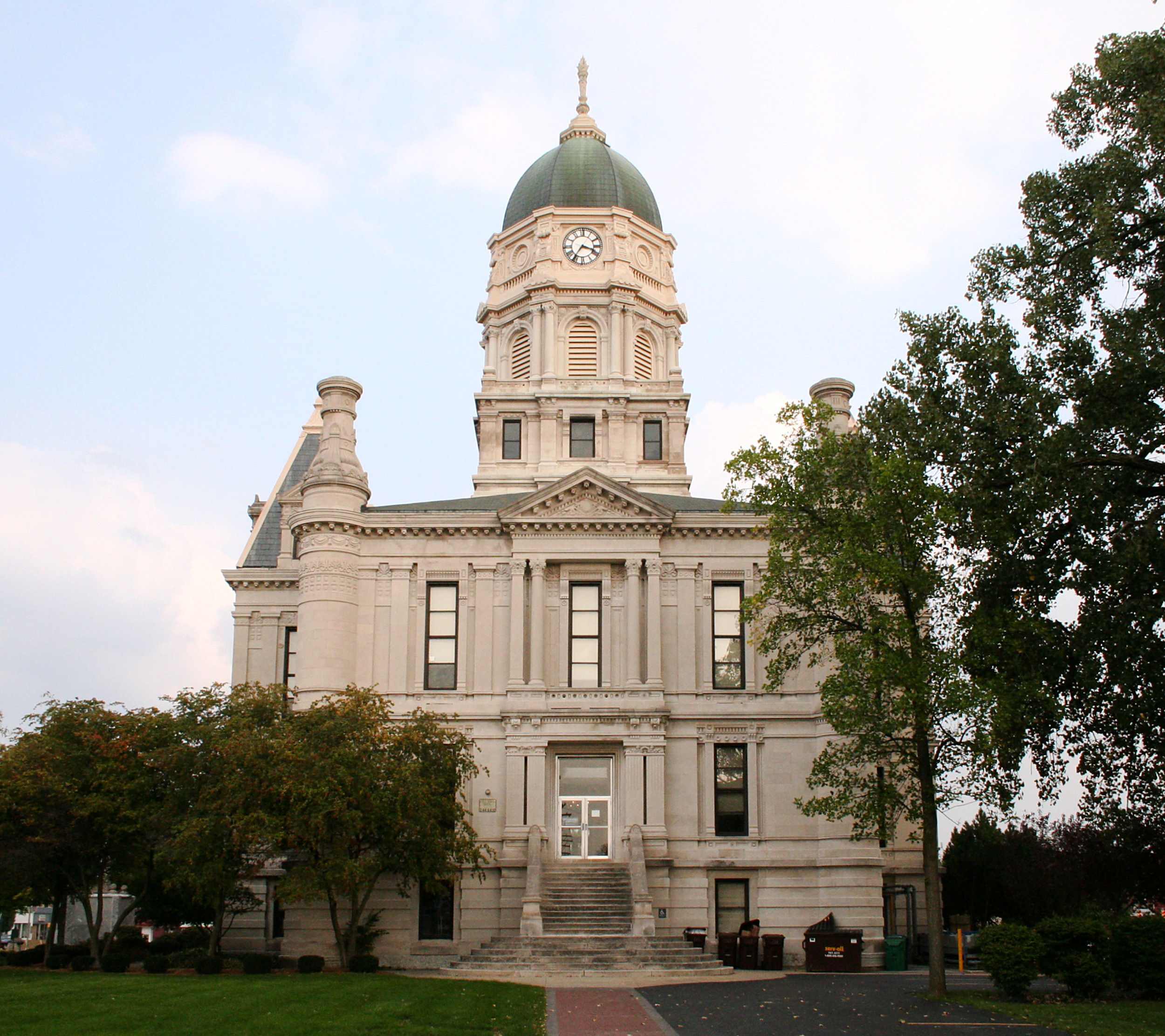
Whitley County Courthouse, Columbia City, Indiana

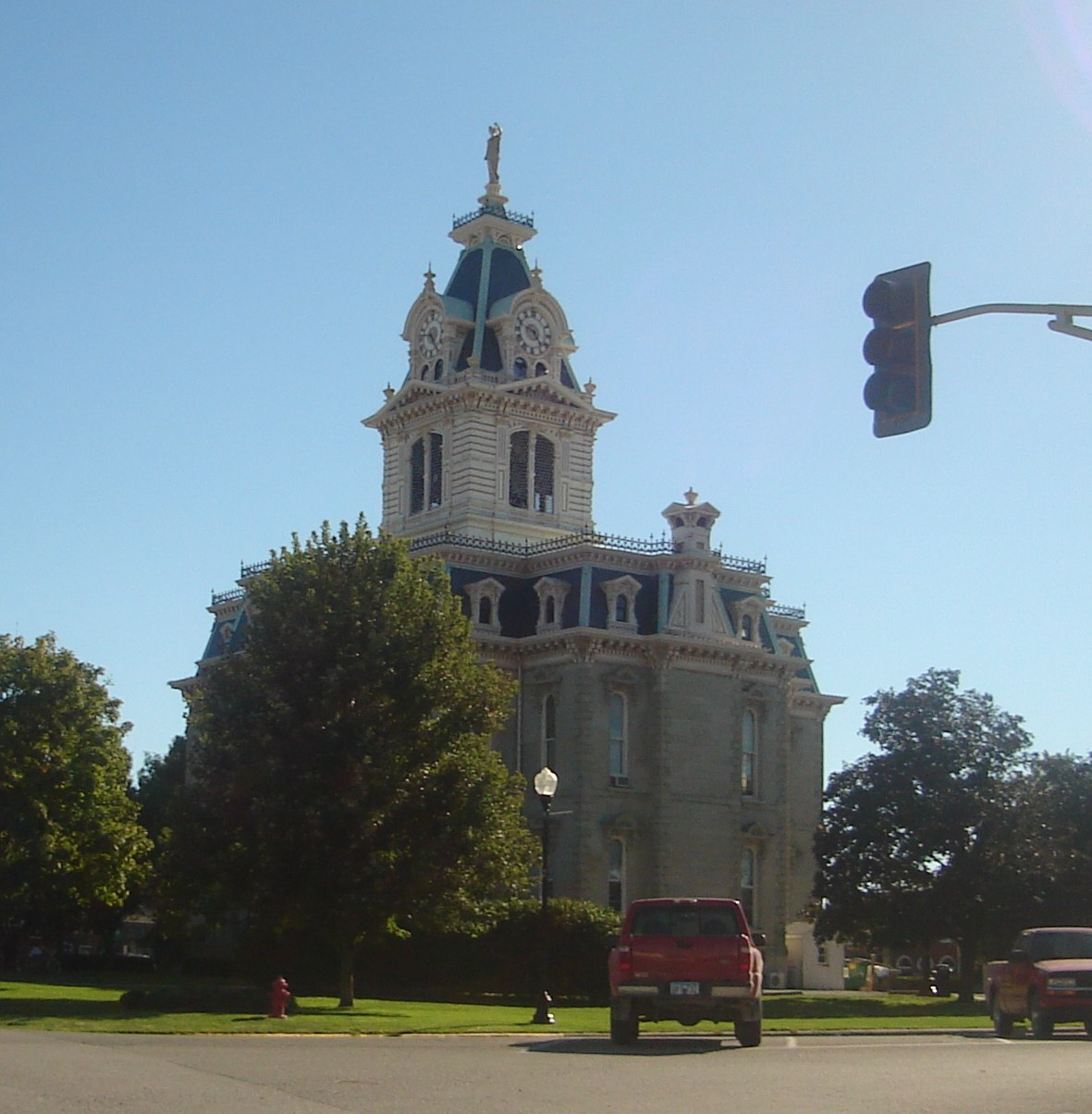
Davis County Courthouse, Bloomfield, Iowa,

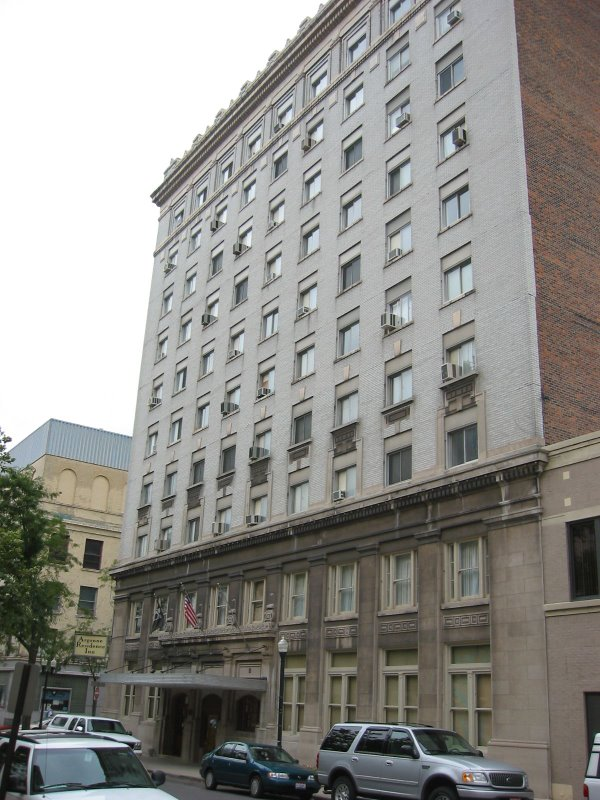
Argonne Hotel, Lima, Ohio

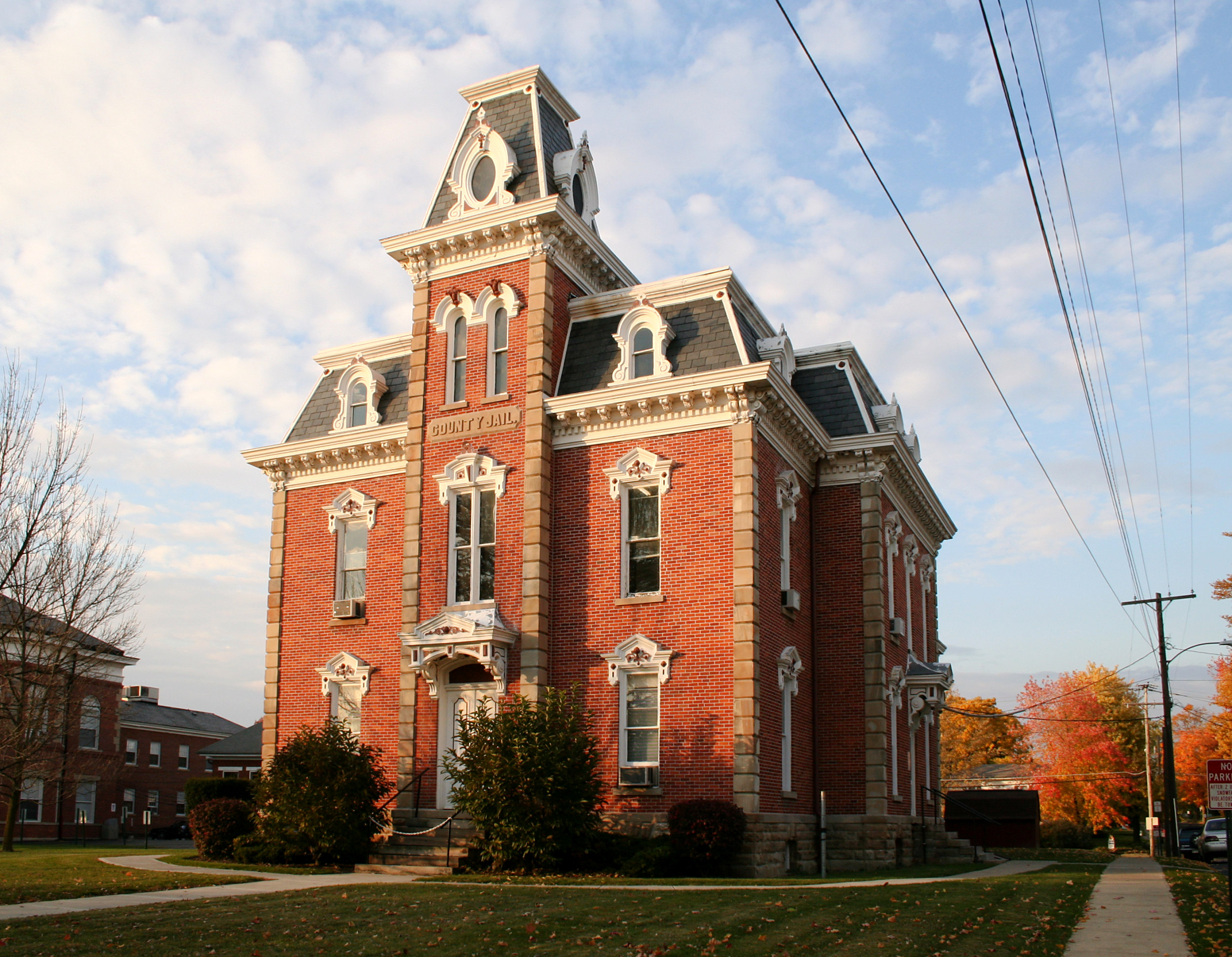
Morrow County Jail and Sheriff's Residence, Mount Gilead, Ohio

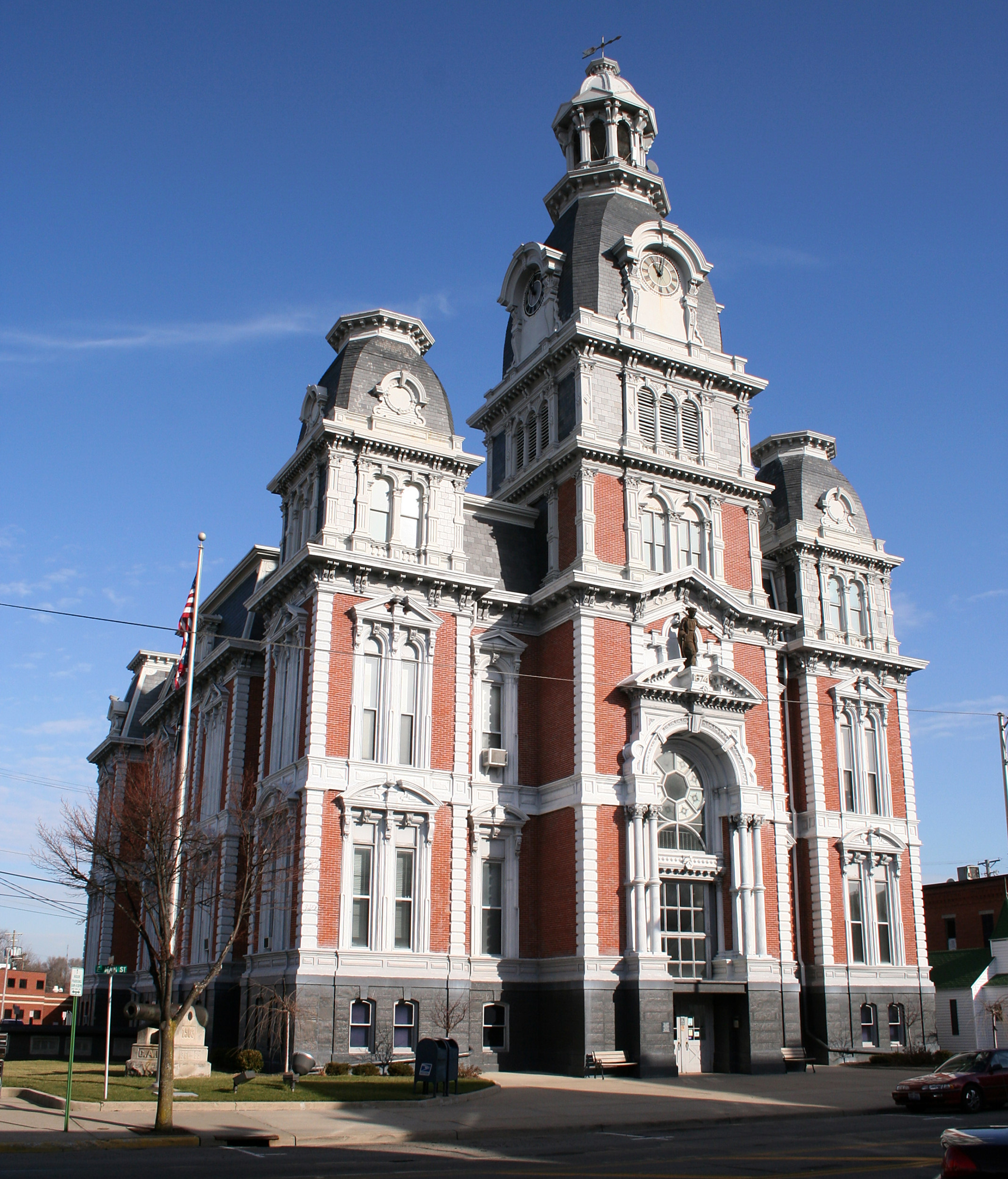
Van Wert County Courthouse, Van Wert, Ohio
