= Union Center, Indiana =

Unincorporated community in Indiana, U.S.

- Unincorporated town
- Location within Indiana Location within the United States
- Coordinates: 41°29′03″N 86°38′23″W
- Country: United States
- State: Indiana
- County: LaPorte
- Township: Clinton
- FIPS code: 18-01000
- GNIS feature ID: 445070

Union Center is an unincorporated community in LaPorte County, Indiana, in the United States.

== Geography ==
Union Center is located in Union Township, just north of U.S. Route 6 in Indiana.

== History ==
The community took its name from Union Township.

The Union Center Church of the Brethren was founded in 1859. The church building was built in 1869 by George W. Cripe, an elder of the church. In 1917, the church had over 200 members.

The Baltimore and Ohio Railroad (B&O) was built through LaPorte County in 1874, and was routed through Alida, Tracy, Wellsboro, and Union Center. A post office opened under the name "Union Centre" in 1884; the spelling was changed to "Center" in 1892. The population was 30 in 1890.

The Union Center School was built in 1900, at a cost of around $12,000, including the land and barns. Later improvements were made to the building, which was constructed by W.S. Rowe. Eight years later, the two remaining students in the Union Township school district #2 were moved to Union Center, and #2 was closed.

In 1904, Union Center was considered one of two villages in Union Township (the other being Kingsbury). It was the site of "a good store, a grain elevator, and several homes".

The Union Center post office closed in 1924. The population was 25 in 1940. At that time, Union Center was considered a "tiny village"; a proposed federal munitions loading plant in Union Center had caused many unemployed men to seek employment in Union Center, where no plant had yet been built. In October 1940, the US Department of War in Washington, DC, began issuing federal buyout notices in the Union Center area. 250 land owners in the area were bought out to make room for the munitions plant in Union Center; residents had only 30 days to vacate their premises.

== See also ==
- Springville, LaPorte County, Indiana
