= Plainfield =

Plainfield may refer to:

== Places ==
=== Canada ===
- Plainfield, Ontario

=== United States ===
- Plainfield, California
- Plainfield, Connecticut
  - Plainfield Village, Connecticut
- Plainfield, Georgia
- Plainfield, Illinois
- Plainfield, Indiana, a town in Hendricks County
- Plainfield, St. Joseph County, Indiana, an unincorporated community
- Plainfield, Iowa
- Plainfield, Massachusetts
- Plainfield, Michigan (disambiguation), several places
- Plainfield, New Hampshire, a town
  - Plainfield (CDP), New Hampshire, a census-designated place and village in the town
- Plainfield, New Jersey
- Plainfield, New York
- Plainfield, Ohio
- Plainfield, Pennsylvania
- Plainfield, Vermont, a town
  - Plainfield (CDP), Vermont, a census-designated place and village in the town
- Plainfield (town), Wisconsin
  - Plainfield, Wisconsin, a village mostly within the town

== Other uses ==
- Plainfield (soil), a soil series found in the Midwestern US and southern Ontario, Canada

== See also ==
- Plainfield Academy (disambiguation)
- Plainfield High School (disambiguation)
- Plainfield Township (disambiguation)
