= LaCrosse High School =

Location
- 11 N. Michigan St. LaCrosse, Indiana 46348; United States; 41°19′05″N 86°53′24″W

Information
- Type: Public high school
- Established: 1890
- School district: Tri-Township Consolidated School Corporation
- Teaching staff: 20.00 (FTE)
- Grades: 9–12
- Enrollment: 171 (2023–2024)
- Student to teacher ratio: 8.55
- Color
- Athletics conference: Porter County Conference
- Nickname: Tigers
- Website: LaCrosse High School

LaCrosse High School was a public high school in LaCrosse, Indiana and was part of the Tri-Township Consolidated School Corporation. In 2022, the school closed, and as a result, students in the Town of LaCrosse started attending Tri-Township Junior/Senior High School in Wanatah, Indiana. In the mid-2010s the school was visited by individuals from the filmmaking industry who were curious to see one of the last remaining gymnasiums in Indiana that resembled the gym in the movie "Hoosiers." In the early 2000s the monster truck Grave Digger made an appearance at the school organized by one of the drivers of the monster truck who lived in the town.

== About ==
The current building was completed in 1915 and the gymnasium was added in 1950. It serves high school students from 3 townships (Dewey, Cass, & Prairie) in the southern part of LaPorte County.

== Demographics ==
The demographic breakdown of the 107 students as of the 2015–2016 school year was as follows:

- Male – 51.4%
- Female – 48.6%
- Hispanic – 4.7%
- White – 95.3%

32.7% of the students were eligible for free or reduced-cost lunch. In 2015–2016, LaCrosse was a Title I school.

== Academics ==
=== Performance ratings ===
In 2013, the Indiana Department of Education recognized LaCrosse High School as a 4-star school, the only high school in LaPorte County to do so. Additionally, the school has received an "A" rating by INDOE since 2012.

=== Testing ===
In 2011, LaCrosse High School students passed the ECA in English 10 with a 90% passing rate and Algebra I with an 86% passing rate.

== Extracurricular activities ==
Available at LaCrosse High School are: National Honor Society, Student Council, Drama Club, Spanish Club, Friends of Rachel, Yearbook Club, Spell Bowl, Academic Super Bowl, and Girls' Book Group.

== See also ==
- List of high schools in Indiana
