= Alida, Indiana =

- Unincorporated town
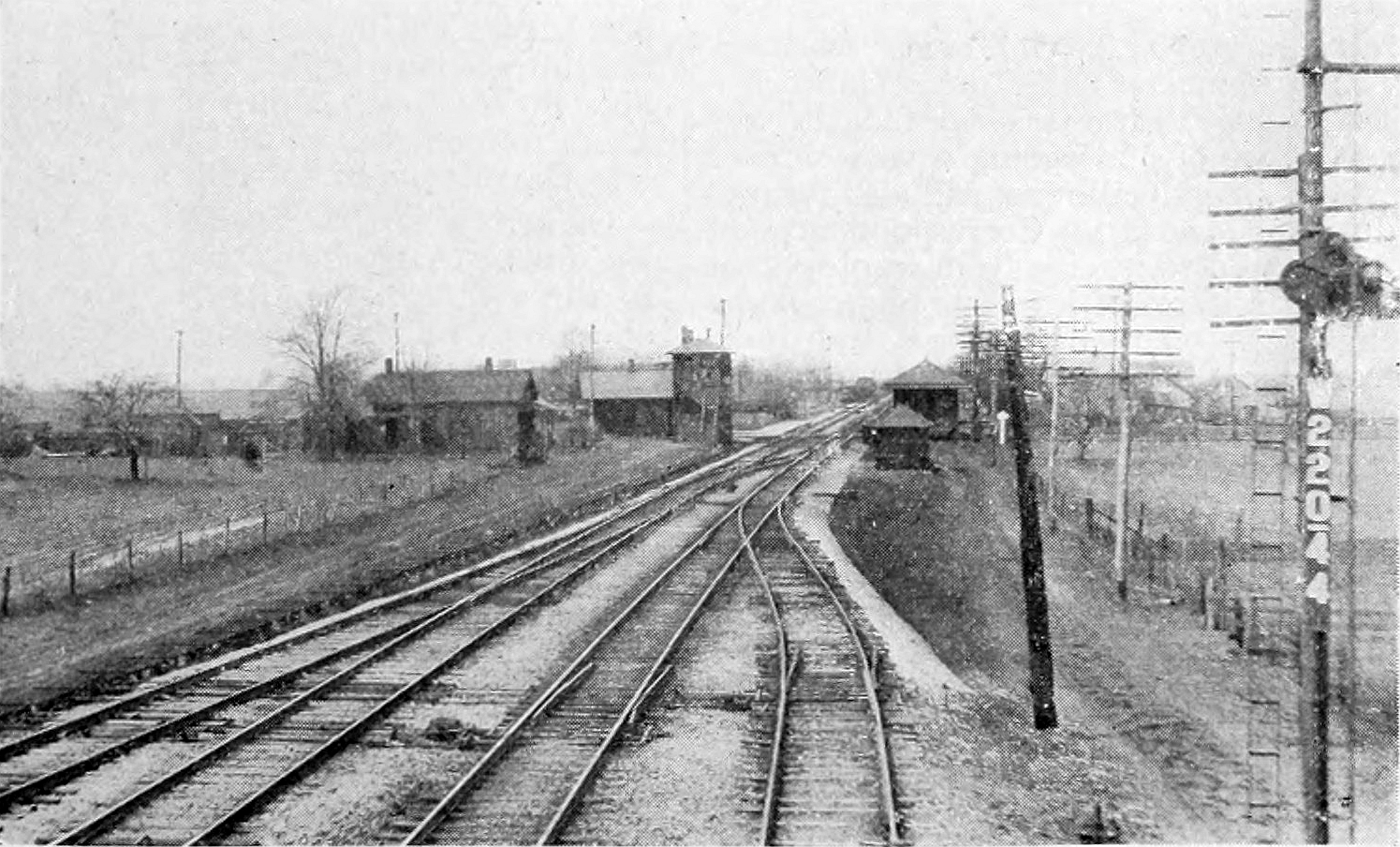
- Baltimore and Ohio Railroad in Alida, 1920

- Location within Indiana Location within the United States
- Coordinates: 41°30′38″N 86°54′11″W
- Country: United States
- State: Indiana
- County: LaPorte
- Township: Clinton
- Elevation: 781 ft (238 m)
- ZIP code: 46391
- FIPS code: 18-01000
- GNIS feature ID: 430076

Alida is an unincorporated town in Clinton Township, LaPorte County, Indiana, United States.

== Geography ==
Alida is located in section 5 of Clinton Township, 0.5 miles (0.80 km) west of U.S. Route 421 in Indiana.

== History ==
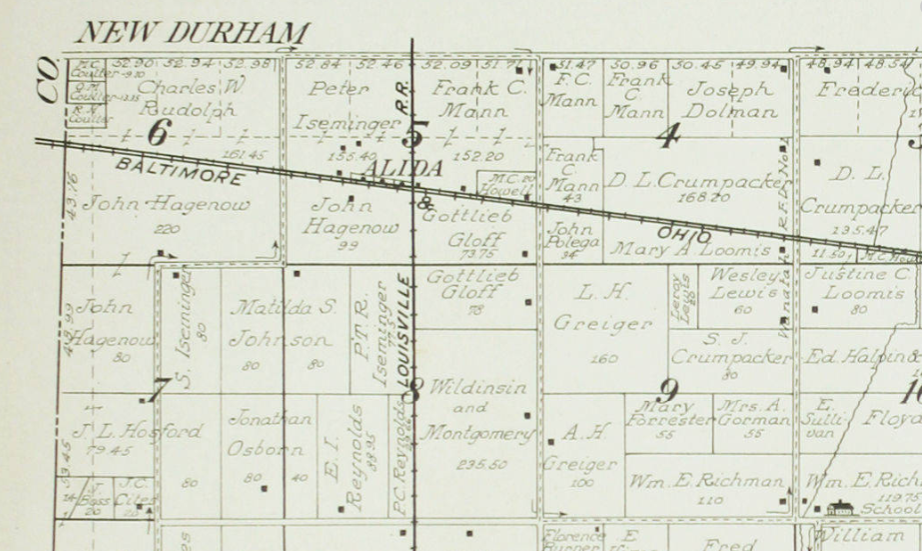
Alida in LaPorte County, Indiana, in 1921.

Alida had its start at the junction of the Baltimore and Ohio and Louisville, New Albany and Corydon Railroads, where in 1880 there were just five houses and the rail depot. Alida was a station on the Monon Route, between Westville and Haskells.

The village of Alida was noted as the location of a diphtheria epidemic in September 1896. The outbreak, which also affected the La Porte County communities of Hanna and Wanatah, made state and national headlines; a number of deaths were recorded.

In 1900, Alida's population was reported as 50 residents.

A post office operated in Alida from 1876 until 1932.

Alida's population was 30 in 1940.

== See also ==
Haskell, Indiana
