= Tri-Township Junior/Senior High School =

- Tri-Township Junior/Senior High School

Location
- 309 School Drive; Wanatah, LaPorte County, Indiana 46390; United States
- Coordinates: 41.4266°N 86.8937°W

Information
- Type: Public high school
- School district: Tri-Township Consolidated School Corporation
- Superintendent: Dr. Paige McNulty
- Principal: Mr. Brian McMahan
- Faculty: 16.50 (FTE)
- Grades: 6–12
- Enrollment: 143 (2024–25)
- Student to teacher ratio: 8.67
- Color
- Athletics conference: Porter County Conference
- Mascot: Tigers
- Website: tritownship.k12.in.us

Tri-Township Junior/Senior High School is a public high school located in Wanatah, Indiana.

== History ==
In 2011, the Indiana Board of Education and voters approved the consolidation of Cass Township (Wanatah) and Dewey-Prairie Township (LaCrosse) School Corporations. This consolidation formed the Tri-Township Consolidated School Corporation. From 2011 to 2022, Tri-Township School Corporation had two school buildings — Tri-Township (Wanatah) for pre-k through eight grade and LaCrosse High School for ninth through twelfth grade.

During the 2021–2022 school year, construction on additional classrooms on the Tri-Township building began. Since the 2022–2023 school year, Tri-Township Elementary and Tri-Township Jr./Sr. High School have been held in one school building.

== Athletics ==
Tri-Township Jr./Sr. High School Tigers compete in the Porter County Conference (PCC). The school offers multiple athletics including middle school, junior varsity (JV), and varsity (V) sports teams.

=== Middle school ===
- Baseball (6th/7th-8th)
- Basketball (6th/7th/8th)
- Cross Country (Co-Ed)
- Softball
- Track and field (Co-Ed)
- Volleyball (Boy's 6th–8th/Girl's 7th/8th)

=== High school ===
- Baseball (V)
- Basketball (Boy's and Girl's; JV/V)
- Cross Country (Boy's and Girl's; V)
- Golf (Boy's and Girl's; V)
- Softball (JV/V)
- Track and field (Boy's and Girl's; V)
- Volleyball (Boy's and Girl's; JV/V)
