= New Prairie United School Corporation =

School district in Indiana, United States

New Prairie United School Corporation operates five schools in Indiana.

The district, mostly in LaPorte County, includes the Hudson Lake and Rolling Prairie census-designated places, as well as a northeast portion of the City of LaPorte. The district includes almost all of Kankakee Township, and all of the townships of Galena, Hudson, and Wills.

== Athletics ==
New Prairie High School was formerly a founding member of the Northern State Conference, which includes the schools of Bremen, Culver Community, Jimtown, John Glenn, Knox, Laville, Triton, and New Prairie. NPHS now belongs to the Northern Indiana Conference.

IHSAA sports offered include:

- Fall— Football, Cross Country, Poms, Men's Tennis, Women's Golf, Volleyball
- Winter— Men's Basketball, Poms, Women's Basketball, Wrestling, Swimming and Diving
- Spring— Baseball, Softball, Track & Field, Men's Golf, Women's Tennis

== Extra-curricular ==
=== Robotics team ===
New Prairie's FIRST Robotics Competition team, Las Pumas, completed their ninth season of competition in 2015. In Indiana's inaugural District Competitions, they claimed their first ever championship. They were chosen as the third member of the victorious alliance of team 234 CyberBlue and team 1024 Kil-A-Bytes, both from Indianapolis, at the Purdue District Event, held at the Co-Rec.

=== Choral Department ===
The program includes two choirs:

- Sing Sensation: advanced women's show choir and concert choir
- Concert choir

All choirs are under the direction of Mr. Everett Forrester.

=== Theater Company ===
New Prairie Theater Company has fall play and spring musical each year. In 2010–11, the theater presented Moon over Buffalo and Joseph and the Amazing Technicolor Dreamcoat. In 2011–12, the theater presented Once Upon a Mattress and The Murder Room. In 2012–13, the theater presented Footloose and The Glass Menagerie. In 2013–14, the theater presented Les Miserables and The Matchmaker. In 2014–15, the theater presented Into the Woods and The Night of January 16th. In 2015–16, the theater presented Grease. In 2016–17 the theater presented Camp Rock. In 2017–18 the theater presented Annie. In 2018–19 the theater presented The 25th Annual Putnam County Spelling Bee. Mrs. Kortney Brennan and Mr. Bennett are the current directors.

=== Band / Marching Band ===
Directors:

- Jared Jaggi (2022–present)
- Patrick Teykl (2014–2022)
- Tiffany Galus (2012–2014)
- Mark Belsaas (–2012)

Color Guard Instructors:

- Emily Rowe & Hayley Shankland (2017–2022)
- Alex Cooper & Katelynn Weathers (2013–2017)
- Lyndee Stisher (2013)
- Ellyn Koselke & Jess Bealor (2010–2013)

The New Prairie "Marching Cougars" are a competitive marching band that performs in many parades and competitions in the area, along with the home game halftime shows. They perform in summertime parades in Walkerton, Bremen, LaPorte, New Carlisle, and Michigan City. In 2010 and 2011, the marching band won first place in the LaPorte Fourth of July Parade. They were invited to march at the Indy 500, as well as Indiana and Purdue Universities. The Marching Cougars compete in many ISSMA competitive marching competitions from September–October. In 2014, the band competed in Scholastic Class A state finals, with their show "Twisted Wonderland", and in 2018, they went to Class B semi-state with their show "Breathe". The concert band season takes place during the winter and spring, and jazz band and pep band play at the home girls and boys basketball games. Many NPHS band students have been selected to perform in a variety of honor ensembles, including IBA All-District, Ball State Honor Festival, ISU Honor Festival, and IMEA All-State Honor Bands.

=== Clubs ===
Other clubs include anime club, art club, color guard, dance team, academic decathlon, bowling, cheerleading, discussion club, environmental club, FBLA, French club, French honor society, Hoosier academic super bowl, Hoosier state spell bowl, HOSA, karate club, kazoo club, key club, mock trial, model club, national honor society, pep club, PSA, quiz bowl, robotics, rocket club, RSVP, SADD, soccer, Spanish club, Spanish honor society, student senate, varsity letter club, and yearbook.

== Board of education ==
The district is operated by a 5-member Board of Education. Members (as of 2025) are:

- Phillip King – Board President
- Jason DeMeyer – Vice President
- Jill Smith – Secretary
- Rich Shail – Board Member
- Rich Gadacz – Board Member

== Schools ==
The district, located in northwest Indiana, includes 1 high school, 1 middle school, and 3 elementary schools.

=== High school ===
- New Prairie High School

Principal: Mr. Justin Heinold
Assistant Principal: Mr. Casey Martin
Mascot: Cougars

=== Middle school ===
- New Prairie Middle School

Principal: Ms. Heidi West
Assistant Principal: Mr. Eric Wozniak
Mascot: Cougars

=== Elementary schools ===
- Olive Township

Principal: Mrs. Tara Bush
Mascot: Tigers

- Prairie View

Principal: Mr. Timothy Pedley
Mascot: Bobcats

- Rolling Prairie

Principal: Mr. David Burden
Mascot: Bull Dogs

In December 2011, Prairie View Elementary and Rolling Prairie Elementary Schools of the New Prairie United School Corporation were recognized as 2010-2011 Four Star Schools by the Indiana Department of Education. Out of 1,780 Indiana public schools, 162 earned this distinction. Eleven of 238 non-public schools also received the honor this year. To be considered a Four Star School, a school's combined English/Language Arts and Math ISTEP+ passing percentages must fall into the top 25th percentile when compared to schools statewide. A school must also have made Adequate Yearly Progress under the federal No Child Left Behind Act to qualify.
