= Chesapeake & Indiana Railroad =

Railroad in Indiana, United States

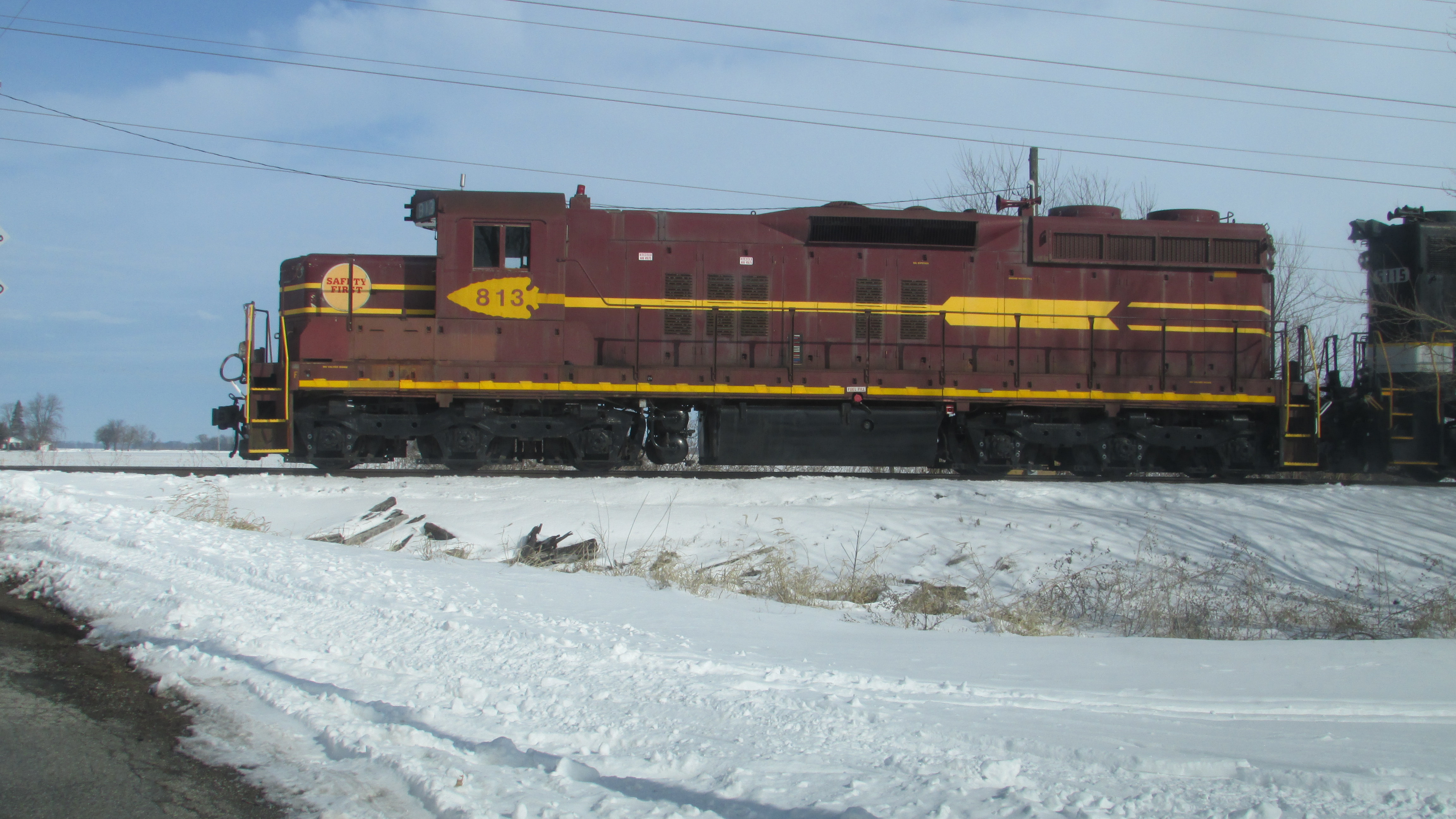
- Locomotive 813

Overview
- Headquarters: LaCrosse, Indiana
- Reporting mark: CKIN
- Locale: Indiana
- Dates of operation: 2004–

Technical
- Track gauge: 4 ft 8 1/2 in (1,435 mm) standard gauge

The Chesapeake & Indiana Railroad (reporting mark CKIN) is a Class III short-line railroad operating 33 miles (53 km) of rail line in northwestern Indiana. From the headquarters town of La Crosse, lines run northwest to the Porter County town of Malden, southeast to the Starke County towns of English Lake and North Judson, and northeast through La Porte County past Thomaston and Hanna to Wellsboro.

The Chesapeake & Indiana is mostly used for transporting grain from rural elevators to the mainline railroad systems. The railroad interchanges with Norfolk Southern at Thomaston and CSX at Wellsboro. It moved only 700 cars on startup in 2004, having increased that to 3,000 cars by 2011, with growth expected in the coming years.

When the railroad first started, the only connection with a Class I was in Wellsboro, IN with the CSX. The C&I and NS will soon build a connection in Thomaston to allow more cars per year and competitive shipping rates between the two Class I's.

Rail tours are also operated on the C&I line by the Hoosier Valley Railroad Museum, starting in North Judson and running to English Lake.

CKIN had been owned by the Town of North Judson and was operated under lease by the Indiana Boxcar Corporation until 2019 and Midwest & Bluegrass Rail afterward. M&BR acquired the railroad in 2021.

On May 12, 2023, Gulf & Atlantic Railways announced that it had completed its purchase of CKIN.
