= Indiana State Road 104 =

State highway in Indiana, United States

State Road 104
- SR 104 highlighted in red

Route information
- Maintained by INDOT
- Length: 9.519 mi (15.319 km)
- Existed: 1940s–present

Major junctions
- West end: SR 4 near LaPorte
- East end: US 6 at Walkerton

Location
- Country: United States
- State: Indiana
- Counties: LaPorte, St. Joseph

Highway system
- Indiana State Highway System; Interstate; US; State; Scenic
← SR 103	→ SR 105

State Road 104 (SR 104) is a state road in the northern section of the US state of Indiana. It serves as a connector between SR 4 near Stillwell to U.S. Route 6 (US 6) in Walkerton. The highway runs parallel to a rail line in a northwest-to-southeast direction in rural LaPorte and St. Joseph counties. SR 104 dates back to the 1940s.

== Route description ==
SR 104 begins in La Porte County at an all-way stop with SR 4 and County Road 300 South, a few miles southeast of the city of La Porte. The route heads southeast towards Walkerton, paralleling a Chicago South Shore and South Bend Railroad track. The road is a two-lane rural highway, passing through farmland with some houses. SR 104 passes through the unincorporated community of Stillwell and crosses the Canadian National Railway. Southeast of Stillwell the highway drifts away from the Chicago South Shore and South Bend Railroad track, for a short distance, before crossing the Kankakee River. After the river, SR 104 passes between the southeast end of the Chicago South Shore and South Bend Railroad track and the north end of a Norfolk Southern rail track. SR 104 continues southeast now paralleling the Norfolk Southern track and enters St. Joseph County. The route enters Walkerton and crosses the CSX Railroad track, soon after the tracks the SR 104 designation ends at US 6 (Roosevelt Road). The roadway continues southeast as Industrial Park Drive passing through the Walkerton Industrial Park Southwest.

No segment of State Road 104 in Indiana is included in the National Highway System (NHS). The NHS is a network of highways that are identified as being most important for the economy, mobility and defense of the nation. The highway is maintained by the Indiana Department of Transportation (INDOT) like all other state roads in the state. The department tracks the traffic volumes along all state roads as a part of its maintenance responsibilities using a metric called average annual daily traffic (AADT). This measurement is a calculation of the traffic level along a segment of roadway for any average day of the year. In 2016, INDOT figured that lowest traffic levels were 1,163 vehicles used the highway daily from at the La Port–St. Joseph county line. The peak traffic volumes were 1,698 vehicles used the highway daily at western end SR 104.

== History ==
SR 104 was added to the state road system between 1942 and 1945, running along its current routing between SR 4 and US 6 in Walkerton. The entire roadway was paved between 1956 and 1959. The routing of SR 104 has remained the same since.

== Major intersections ==
County	Location	mi	km	Destinations	Notes
LaPorte	Pleasant Township	0.000	0.000	SR 4 – LaPorte, Fish Lake	Western terminus of SR 104
St. Joseph	Lincoln Township	9.519	15.319	US 6 – Gary, Walkerton	Eastern terminus of SR 104
1.000 mi = 1.609 km; 1.000 km = 0.621 mi
