= Indiana State Road 4 =

Highway in Indiana

State Road 4
- SR 4 highlighted in red

Route information
- Maintained by INDOT

Western segment
- West end: SR 2 in La Porte
- Major intersections: SR 104 in Stillwell; SR 23 in North Liberty; SR 931 in Lakeville
- East end: US 31 near Lakeville

Central segment Philip T. Warner Highway
- Length: 5.310 mi (8.546 km)
- West end: Lincoln Avenue at Goshen city limits
- East end: SR 13 near Goshen

Eastern segment
- Length: 5.935 mi (9.551 km)
- West end: SR 327 in Helmer
- East end: I-69 in Ashley

Location
- Country: United States
- State: Indiana
- Counties: LaPorte, St. Joseph, Elkhart, DeKalb, Steuben

Highway system
- Indiana State Highway System; Interstate; US; State; Scenic
← SR 3	→ SR 5

State Road 4 (SR 4) is an east–west discontinuous state road in the US state of Indiana. The western end of the western segment is in La Porte. The highway passes through rural areas of LaPorte and St. Joseph counties, before ending near Lakeville. The central segment starts at the eastern city limits of Goshen and heads east passing through rural Elkhart County, before ending at SR 13. The eastern segment runs between SR 327 and Interstate 69 (I-69), passing through the towns of Ashley. The state road runs through five counties in northern Indiana mostly through rural farm fields and small towns.

Dating back to the early days of the state road system, SR 4 was first signed in the southern part of the state. It was moved to its modern routing in 1932, running from Goshen to SR 13. In the early to mid 1940s, SR 4 was added to the state road system between La Porte and Lakeville, while the eastern segment was added in the late 1940s, running from SR 327 to U.S. Highway 27 (US 27). The segment of roadway east of I-69 was removed from the state road system in the early 1970s. In the mid-2010s the western segment of roadway was extended east to meet the new alignment of US 31 and the western end of the central segment was moved from downtown Goshen to the eastern city limits.

== Route description ==
=== Western segment ===
The western segment is the longest of the three section of SR 4, at 25 miles (40 km). The segment begins at the corner of Lincolnway (SR 2) and Monroe Street, in La Porte. It follows Monroe Street southeasterly passing through mostly residential area of the city. The road leaves the city and enters rural LaPorte County; in LaPorte County SR 4 crosses over a Chicago South Shore and South Bend Railroad track. After crossing the track the road parallels it to the southeast before a four-way stop with the northern end of SR 104 and county road 300 South. At this intersection SR 4 turns towards the northeast, while SR 104 continues towards the southeast. SR 4 quickly bends to become generally east–west, before curving back towards the southeast. After becoming northwest-southeast SR 4 crosses over Canadian National Railroad track and through Fish Lake, between Lower Fish Lake and Upper Fish Lake.

SR 4 passes over Kankakee River before curving to become north–south. Soon after becoming north–south, SR 4 bends to become east–west and passes over another branch of the Kankakee River. The road enters North Liberty and is concurrent with Center Street, passing through an intersection with SR 23. East of North Liberty the road passes on the south side of Potato Creek State Park, while passing through farm fields and wooded areas. SR 4 passes on the north side of Lakeville having an intersection with SR 931. The road leaves Lakeville before having an interchange with US 31. SR 4 ends at this interchange but the roadway itself continues east as Pierce Road, a county road in St. Joseph County.

=== Central segment ===
The central segment begins as a continuation of Lincoln Avenue at the eastern city limits of the city of Goshen. The road heads northeast from Goshen while passing by farm and fields, in rural Elkhart County. The highway has an all-way stop with County Road 35 before bending to become east–west. SR 4 ends at a three-way intersection with SR 13 with SR 13 heading north and east from this intersection.

=== Eastern segment ===
The eastern segment of SR 4 begins at a three-way intersection with SR 327, just south of Helmer. SR 4 heads east as the Dekalb–Steuben county line, parallel to an Indiana Northeastern Railroad track, passing by agricultural land. The road enters the town of Ashley, concurrent with State Street, passing between industrial and residential properties, before entering downtown Ashley. East of downtown State Street, the highway passes by houses before an interchange with I-69. The SR 4 designation ends at this interchange, while the roadway continues east as a county road.

== History ==
SR 4 prior to 1926 was designated between SR 5, now SR 550, and the Ohio state line, east of Lawrenceburg, generally routed along the modern corridor of US 50. Between 1926 and 1932 the SR 4 designation went unused. In 1932 SR 4 was designated between Goshen and SR 13 was designated. Between 1939 and 1941 SR 727 was commissioned, between SR 327 and Ashley, along the modern SR 4. The western segment was added to the state road system between 1942 and 1945, between LaPorte and Lakeville. The eastern segment of SR 4 was added either in 1949 or 1950, routed between SR 727, in Ashley, and US 27. SR 4 was extended west to SR 327 from Ashley replacing SR 727. The eastern terminus of SR 4 was moved west to I-69 from US 27 between 1970 and 1971. During 2014 the western segment of SR 4 was extended east to an interchange at the new route of US 31. SR 4 was extended to the US 31 freeway in conjunction with that facility opening in 2014. The segment of SR 4 from US 33/SR 15 to the eastern city limits of Goshen was removed from the state road system between 2015 and 2016.

== Major intersections ==
County	Location	mi	km	Destinations	Notes
LaPorte	La Porte	0.000	0.000	SR 2 / Lincoln Highway	Western terminus of SR 4
LaPorte	Pleasant Township	6.469	10.411	SR 104 south – Walkerton	Northern terminus of SR 104
St. Joseph	North Liberty	17.377	27.966	SR 23 (North Main Street / South State Street)	
St. Joseph	Lakeville	25.401	40.879	SR 931 (Michigan Road)	Former US 31
St. Joseph	Union Township			US 31 – Plymouth, South Bend	Eastern terminus of western segment
Gap in route
Elkhart	Goshen	26.991	43.438	Lincoln Avenue	Western terminus of central segment
Elkhart	Clinton Township	32.301	51.983	SR 13 – Middlebury	Eastern terminus of central segment
Gap in route
DeKalb–Steuben county line	Helmer	32.489	52.286	SR 327 (South Bronson Road)	Western terminus of eastern segment
DeKalb–Steuben county line	Ashley	38.316– 38.424	61.664– 61.837	I-69 – Fort Wayne, Lansing	I-69 Exit 340
1.000 mi = 1.609 km; 1.000 km = 0.621 mi
