= South Wanatah, Indiana =

- Unincorporated community
- Location within Indiana Location within the United States
- Coordinates: 41°24′21″N 86°53′57″W
- Country: United States
- State: Indiana
- County: LaPorte
- Township: Cass
- Elevation: 722 ft (220 m)
- ZIP code: 46390
- FIPS code: 18-71558
- GNIS feature ID: 443866

South Wanatah is an unincorporated community in Cass Township, LaPorte County, Indiana.

== History ==
South Wanatah was once called Roselle. Roselle was platted in 1859. It lies south of Wanatah, Indiana, hence the present name.
