= Scipio Township, Indiana =

Scipio Township, Indiana may refer to one of the following places:

- Scipio Township, Allen County, Indiana
- Scipio Township, LaPorte County, Indiana

See also

- Scipio Township (disambiguation)
