= Springfield, LaPorte County, Indiana =

Springfield, Indiana
- Unincorporated community
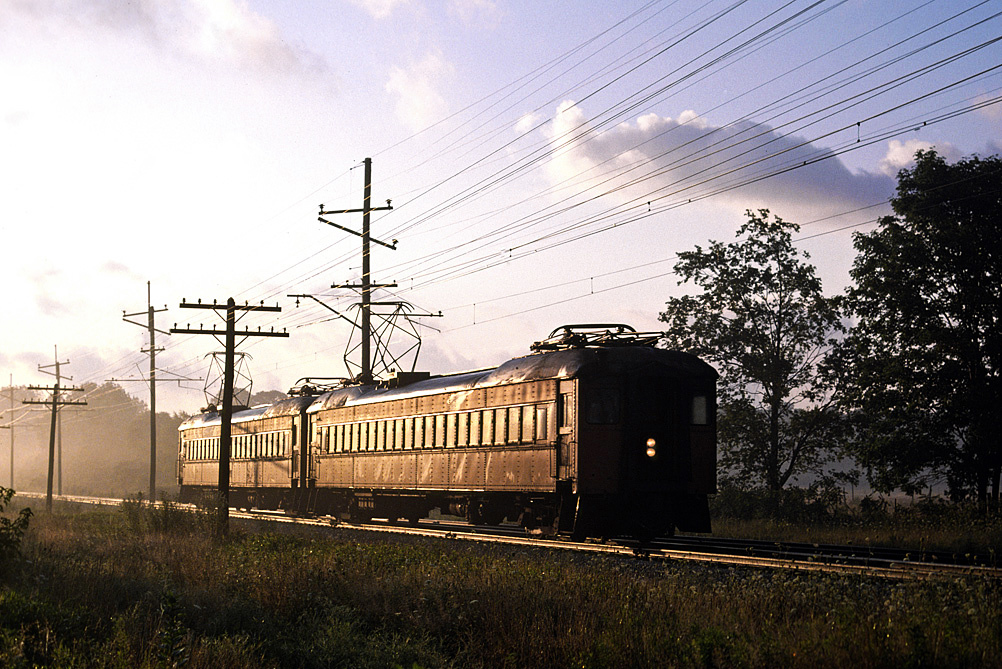
- South Shore Line train near the "Springville" station at Springfield in 1980

- Location within Indiana Location within the United States
- Coordinates: 41°42′55″N 86°46′39″W
- Country: United States
- State: Indiana
- County: LaPorte
- Township: Springfield
- Elevation: 659 ft (201 m)
- ZIP code: 46360
- FIPS code: 18-72160
- GNIS feature ID: 444009

Springfield is an unincorporated community and a former South Shore Line stop in Springfield Township, LaPorte County, Indiana, United States.

The train stop was sometimes labeled Springville, but was several miles away from the community of Springville.
