= Hudson Lake (Indiana) =

- Location within Indiana Location within the United States
- Location: LaPorte County, Indiana
- Coordinates: 41°43′03″N 86°32′51″W
- Type: lake
- Surface area: 432 acres (175 ha)
- Surface elevation: 235 m (771 ft)

Hudson Lake is a natural lake east of Michigan City in LaPorte County, Indiana, United States. It was formed during the most recent glacial retreat of the Pleistocene era.

Hudson Lake is a 423 acres (171 ha) natural lake, located two miles (3.2 km) west of New Carlisle, Indiana and three miles (4.8 km) south of the state line boundary with Michigan. It has its own lakeside community, Hudson Lake, Indiana, and an NICTD electric train station.
