= Beattys Corner, Indiana =

- Unincorporated community
- Location within Indiana Location within the United States
- Coordinates: 41°37′20″N 86°53′38″W
- Country: United States
- State: Indiana
- County: LaPorte
- Elevation: 735 ft (224 m)
- Time zone: UTC-6 (CST)
  - Summer (DST): UTC-5 (CDT)
- ZIP Code: 46360
- Area code: 219
- GNIS feature ID: 430665

Beattys Corner is an unincorporated community in LaPorte County, Indiana, in the United States.

== History ==
John Beatty and his partner started a sawmill in about 1833. Beattys Corner (historically called Beatty's Corners) was laid out and platted in 1842.
