= Riverside, LaPorte County, Indiana =

Riverside, Indiana
- Unincorporated community
- Location within Indiana Location within the United States
- Coordinates: 41°15′22″N 86°53′39″W
- Country: United States
- State: Indiana
- County: LaPorte
- Township: Dewey
- Elevation: 663 ft (202 m)
- ZIP code: 46348
- FIPS code: 18-64854
- GNIS feature ID: 442082

Riverside is an unincorporated community in Dewey Township, LaPorte County, Indiana.
