= Kingsford Heights, Indiana =

Kingsford Heights
- Town
- Town of Kingsford Heights, Indiana
- Logo

- Location of Kingsford Heights in LaPorte County, Indiana.
- Coordinates: 41°28′42″N 86°41′35″W
- Country: United States
- State: Indiana
- County: LaPorte
- Township: Union

Area
  - Total: 0.89 sq mi (2.30 km^{2})
  - Land: 0.89 sq mi (2.30 km^{2})
  - Water: 0 sq mi (0.00 km^{2})
- Elevation: 722 ft (220 m)

Population (2020)
  - Total: 1,335
  - Density: 1,502.9/sq mi (580.26/km^{2})
- Time zone: UTC-6 (CST)
  - Summer (DST): UTC-5 (CDT)
- ZIP code: 46346
- Area code: 219
- FIPS code: 18-39852
- GNIS feature ID: 2396692
- Website: www.townofkingsfordheights.com

Kingsford Heights is a town in Union Township, LaPorte County, Indiana, United States. The population was 1,335 at the 2020 census. It is included in the Michigan City, Indiana-La Porte, Indiana Metropolitan Statistical Area. Also known as "Victory City," the town was built by the United States government for workers that worked in the Kingsbury Ordnance Plant, an ammunitions plant that served the US during World War II and later the Korean War.

== History ==
During World War I, the U.S. east coast munitions plants faced devastating accidents and sabotage, prompting grave concerns among military planners in the late 1930s. To mitigate these risks and expand output, establishing inland facilities became a priority. In line with this strategy, the Kingsbury Ordnance Plant was established in 1940, playing a crucial role in the effort.

One of the primary challenges was accommodating the anticipated 10,000 workers and their families, considering LaPorte County's total population was only 16,000 in 1940. Federal planners responded by creating an entire village near the plant, originally named Victory City, which later became Kingsford Heights in 1942.

The original plans for Kingsford Heights included 3000 homes, along with several businesses, civic buildings, schools, a community center, and several parks spread throughout the community. However, with the conclusion of World War II and soon after, the Korean War, the development of Kingsford Heights slowed and then finally ceased as the ordnance plant closed, and many workers relocated for new job opportunities.

Despite the halt in development, the remaining residents purchased the land from the government and incorporated the town to sustain local services. They also opted to rename the town from Victory City to Kingsford Heights.

Kingsford Heights bears resemblance to other Federal projects like Penderlea Homesteads in North Carolina and to a lesser degree, Greenbelt, Maryland; Greendale, Wisconsin; and Greenhills, Ohio. While these projects often featured multi-family units, Kingsford Heights primarily consisted of single houses. The planning aspect of Kingsford Heights remains highly significant, reflected in the inclusion of the entire community within its boundary, even encompassing lots without houses.

== Geography ==
According to the 2010 census, Kingsford Heights has a total area of 0.94 square miles (2.43 km^{2}), all land.

== Demographics ==
Historical population
Census	Pop.	Note	%±
1950	1,104		—
1960	1,276		15.6%
1970	1,200		−6.0%
1980	1,618		34.8%
1990	1,486		−8.2%
2000	1,453		−2.2%
2010	1,435		−1.2%
2020	1,335		−7.0%
Source: US Census Bureau

=== 2020 census ===
As of the 2020 census, Kingsford Heights had a population of 1,335. The median age was 35.4 years. 28.0% of residents were under the age of 18 and 14.4% of residents were 65 years of age or older. For every 100 females there were 89.1 males, and for every 100 females age 18 and over there were 87.7 males age 18 and over.

0.0% of residents lived in urban areas, while 100.0% lived in rural areas.

There were 485 households in Kingsford Heights, of which 36.9% had children under the age of 18 living in them. Of all households, 41.2% were married-couple households, 16.1% were households with a male householder and no spouse or partner present, and 31.8% were households with a female householder and no spouse or partner present. About 23.1% of all households were made up of individuals and 9.1% had someone living alone who was 65 years of age or older.

There were 545 housing units, of which 11.0% were vacant. The homeowner vacancy rate was 1.2% and the rental vacancy rate was 3.4%.

Racial composition as of the 2020 census
Race	Number	Percent
White	1,073	80.4%
Black or African American	92	6.9%
American Indian and Alaska Native	1	0.1%
Asian	2	0.1%
Native Hawaiian and Other Pacific Islander	0	0.0%
Some other race	15	1.1%
Two or more races	152	11.4%
Hispanic or Latino (of any race)	73	5.5%

=== 2010 census ===
As of the census of 2010, there were 1,435 people, 509 households, and 374 families living in the town. The population density was 1,526.6 inhabitants per square mile (589.4/km^{2}). There were 548 housing units at an average density of 583.0 per square mile (225.1/km^{2}). The racial makeup of the town was 86.3% White, 8.1% African American, 0.6% Native American, 0.3% Asian, 1.1% from other races, and 3.7% from two or more races. Hispanic or Latino of any race were 5.0% of the population.

There were 509 households, of which 42.4% had children under the age of 18 living with them, 45.0% were married couples living together, 21.2% had a female householder with no husband present, 7.3% had a male householder with no wife present, and 26.5% were non-families. 22.4% of all households were made up of individuals, and 9.6% had someone living alone who was 65 years of age or older. The average household size was 2.82 and the average family size was 3.26.

The median age in the town was 33 years. 30.2% of residents were under the age of 18; 8.9% were between the ages of 18 and 24; 25.9% were from 25 to 44; 24.1% were from 45 to 64; and 10.9% were 65 years of age or older. The gender makeup of the town was 47.3% male and 52.7% female.

=== 2000 census ===
As of the census of 2000, there were 1,453 people, 495 households, and 388 families living in the town. The population density was 1,543.7 inhabitants per square mile (596.0/km^{2}). There were 530 housing units at an average density of 563.1 per square mile (217.4/km^{2}). The racial makeup of the town was 86.03% White, 9.70% African American, 0.07% Native American, 0.07% Asian, 0.34% Pacific Islander, 0.69% from other races, and 3.10% from two or more races. Hispanic or Latino of any race were 1.79% of the population.

There were 495 households, out of which 42.0% had children under the age of 18 living with them, 53.9% were married couples living together, 18.8% had a female householder with no husband present, and 21.6% were non-families. 18.0% of all households were made up of individuals, and 7.9% had someone living alone who was 65 years of age or older. The average household size was 2.94 and the average family size was 3.30.

In the town, the population was spread out, with 32.8% under the age of 18, 8.1% from 18 to 24, 31.0% from 25 to 44, 19.3% from 45 to 64, and 8.8% who were 65 years of age or older. The median age was 30 years. For every 100 females, there were 94.3 males. For every 100 females age 18 and over, there were 87.7 males.

The median income for a household in the town was $32,169, and the median income for a family was $34,000. Males had a median income of $31,065 versus $21,477 for females. The per capita income for the town was $13,961. About 11.4% of families and 13.4% of the population were below the poverty line, including 18.4% of those under age 18 and 9.1% of those age 65 or over.

== Education ==
Kingsford Heights has an elementary school, Kingsford Heights Elementary School, a member of the La Porte Community School Corporation. The town lies inside 3 school districts, giving families the option to enroll students in LaPorte Community School Corporation, Oregon-Davis Community School Corporation, or South Central Community Schools. Kingsford Heights also has a public library, a branch of the LaPorte County Public Library.
