= Union Center =

Union Center or Union Centre can refer to:

== Places ==
Canada

- Union Centre, Nova Scotia

United States

- Union Center, Illinois
- Union Center, Indiana
- Union Center, South Dakota
- Union Center, Wisconsin
- Union Center Township, Elk County, Kansas
