= Byron, LaPorte County, Indiana =

Byron, Indiana
- Unincorporated community
- Location within Indiana Location within the United States
- Coordinates: 41°39′26″N 86°37′41″W
- Country: United States
- State: Indiana
- County: LaPorte
- Township: Kankakee
- Elevation: 820 ft (250 m)
- ZIP code: 46371
- FIPS code: 18-09658
- GNIS feature ID: 431927

Byron is an unincorporated community in Kankakee Township, LaPorte County, Indiana.

== History ==
Byron was laid out and platted in 1836. Byron was once considered a center of trade in the area. With the construction of the Northern Indiana Railroad, business activity shifted to other towns, particularly nearby Rolling Prairie, and Byron's population dwindled.
