= Salem Heights =

Salem Heights may refer to a location in the United States:

- Salem Heights, Indiana
- Salem Heights, Columbiana County, Ohio
- Salem Heights, Hamilton County, Ohio
