= Wilders, Indiana =

- Unincorporated community
- Location within Indiana Location within the United States
- Coordinates: 41°16′00″N 86°53′46″W
- Country: United States
- State: Indiana
- County: LaPorte
- Township: Dewey
- Elevation: 666 ft (203 m)
- ZIP code: 46348
- FIPS code: 18-84212
- GNIS feature ID: 446022

Wilders is an unincorporated community in Dewey Township, LaPorte County, Indiana.

== History ==
Wilders, or Wilder Station, was once located at the junction of two railroads. Wilders contained a post office from 1889 until 1933.
