= Pinola =

Pinola may refer to:

- Pinola, Indiana
- Pinola, Mississippi
