= Lake Park, Indiana =

- Unincorporated community
- Location within Indiana Location within the United States
- Coordinates: 41°42′17″N 86°32′59″W
- Country: United States
- State: Indiana
- County: LaPorte
- Township: Hudson
- Elevation: 850 ft (260 m)
- ZIP code: 46552
- FIPS code: 18-41418
- GNIS feature ID: 437535

Lake Park is an unincorporated community in Hudson Township, LaPorte County, Indiana.
