= Byron, Indiana =

Byron, Indiana may refer to:

- Byron, LaPorte County, Indiana, an unincorporated community in Kankakee Township
- Byron, Parke County, Indiana, an unincorporated community in Howard Township
