= Thomaston, Indiana =

Unincorporated community in Indiana

- Unincorporated community
- Location within Indiana Location within the United States
- Coordinates: 41°22′42″N 86°48′51″W
- Country: United States
- State: Indiana
- County: LaPorte
- Township: Hanna
- Elevation: 679 ft (207 m)
- ZIP code: 46390
- FIPS code: 18-75572
- GNIS feature ID: 444697

Thomaston is an unincorporated community in Hanna Township, LaPorte County, Indiana.

== History ==
The Thomaston station was located at the junction of two railroads.
