= Hudson Lake, Indiana =

- Census-designated place
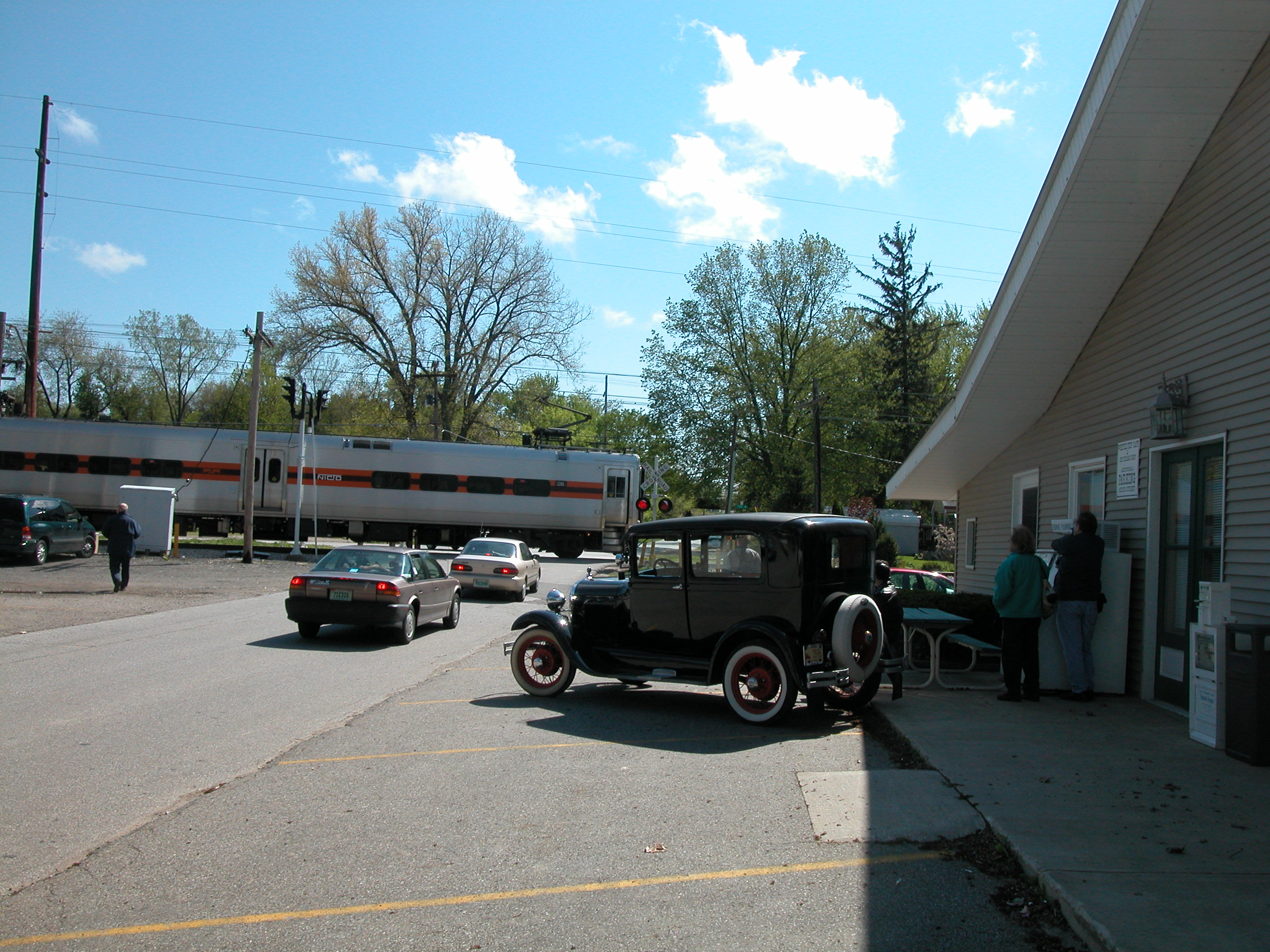
- Cars queuing before a South Shore Line train at a railroad crossing

- Location in LaPorte County, Indiana

- Location within Indiana Location within the United States
- Coordinates: 41°43′03″N 86°32′51″W
- Country: United States
- State: Indiana
- County: LaPorte
- Township: Hudson

Area
  - Total: 2.68 sq mi (6.95 km^{2})
  - Land: 1.93 sq mi (4.99 km^{2})
  - Water: 0.76 sq mi (1.97 km^{2})
- Elevation: 764 ft (233 m)

Population (2020)
  - Total: 1,226
  - Density: 636.7/sq mi (245.85/km^{2})
- ZIP code: 46552
- FIPS code: 18-35104
- GNIS feature ID: 2629778

Hudson Lake is an unincorporated community and census-designated place (CDP) in Hudson Township, LaPorte County, Indiana, United States. The town sits on the dividing line between Central and Eastern time zones. It is the site of the Hudson Lake station stop of the South Shore Line. As of the 2020 census, Hudson Lake had a population of 1,226.

Hudson Lake was originally called "Lakeport", and under the latter name was settled by 1833.

== Geography ==
Hudson Lake is located in northeastern LaPorte County. The community surrounds a natural water body of the same name. While most of the residences are on the north and east sides of the lake, the census-designated place includes the neighborhood of Lake Park on the south side. The South Shore rail line runs along the southern side of the Hudson Lake water body, leading east 15 miles (24 km) to South Bend and west 18 miles (29 km) to Michigan City.

According to the U.S. Census Bureau, the Hudson Lake CDP has a total area of 2.7 square miles (7.0 km^{2}), of which 1.9 square miles (5.0 km^{2}) are land and 0.77 square miles (2.0 km^{2}), or 28.27%, are water.

== Demographics ==
Historical population
Census	Pop.	Note	%±
2020	1,226		—
U.S. Decennial Census

=== 2020 census ===
As of the 2020 census, Hudson Lake had a population of 1,226. The median age was 44.3 years. 21.0% of residents were under the age of 18 and 18.9% of residents were 65 years of age or older. For every 100 females there were 102.0 males, and for every 100 females age 18 and over there were 106.4 males age 18 and over.

0.0% of residents lived in urban areas, while 100.0% lived in rural areas.

There were 527 households in Hudson Lake, of which 29.6% had children under the age of 18 living in them. Of all households, 49.0% were married-couple households, 20.9% were households with a male householder and no spouse or partner present, and 21.8% were households with a female householder and no spouse or partner present. About 28.1% of all households were made up of individuals and 14.2% had someone living alone who was 65 years of age or older.

There were 703 housing units, of which 25.0% were vacant. The homeowner vacancy rate was 1.1% and the rental vacancy rate was 13.3%.

Racial composition as of the 2020 census
Race	Number	Percent
White	1,108	90.4%
Black or African American	2	0.2%
American Indian and Alaska Native	3	0.2%
Asian	5	0.4%
Native Hawaiian and Other Pacific Islander	0	0.0%
Some other race	19	1.5%
Two or more races	89	7.3%
Hispanic or Latino (of any race)	44	3.6%

== Transportation ==
Hudson Lake is served by interurban commuter rail on the South Shore Line. Trains from Hudson Lake Station run to and from Chicago westward, and to and from nearby South Bend eastward. This allows residents of the area to commute into the two larger cities.

== Education ==
The school district is New Prairie United School Corporation.
