= Tracy, Indiana =

- Unincorporated community
- Location within Indiana Location within the United States
- Coordinates: 41°29′07″N 86°40′57″W
- Country: United States
- State: Indiana
- County: LaPorte
- Township: Union
- Elevation: 715 ft (218 m)
- ZIP code: 46532
- FIPS code: 18-76274
- GNIS feature ID: 444845

Tracy is an unincorporated community in Union Township, LaPorte County, Indiana.

== History ==
Tracy (formerly called Tracy Station) contained a post office from 1879 until 1912. The community was named for a railroad employee. The Tracy station was located on the Baltimore and Ohio Railroad.
