= Family Express =

American convenience store chain

Family Express Corporation
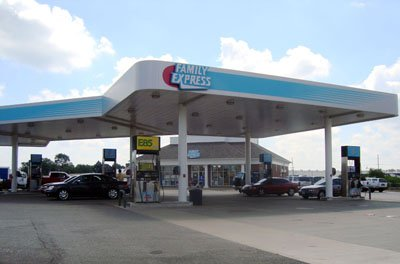
- Company type: Private
- Industry: Retail
- Founded: 1975; 51 years ago
- Headquarters: Valparaiso, Indiana
- Number of locations: 81 (2023)
- Revenue: $250 million (2025)
- Website: www.familyexpress.com

Family Express is a privately held United States convenience store chain headquartered in Valparaiso, Indiana, with more than 80 locations across northern and central Indiana.

Family Express is known for its pursuit of vertical integration, following an approach similar to Kwik Trip. The Family Express logistics model consolidates what would otherwise be 25 direct store deliveries by different vendors to each store weekly into one combined daily delivery by Family Express itself. One result of the company's centralized logistics, according to the company, has been increased freshness.

The company's use of a centralized commissary has been a core aspect of its approach to logistics. In 2004, the company announced plans for its first centralized commissary and bakery at a former warehouse site in Valparaiso. The commissary opened in late 2006. Prior to the launch of the company's commissary, the bakery products were shipped from a manufacturer in Chicago and cross docked for delivery to stores. In 2010, the company built a new 150,000 square feet (14,000 m^{2}) distribution center, which includes a bakery.

The company has attracted attention for its use of its own proprietary branding, including the Cravin's Market brand for bakery items, Java Wave for hot beverages, and square donuts. Branding has extended to the company's delivery trucks as well, which are festooned with upside-down cows and emit a "moo" sound when arriving and leaving each location. In 2016, the company launched a "hot foodservice" brand called Cravin's Kitchen at some locations. Offering kiosk, mobile and app-based ordering, the brand included breakfast sandwiches and "made-to-order" pizzas.

The company released a customer loyalty app in 2019. Developed by retail industry software as a service provider Paytronix, the app included online ordering for hot foodservice items as well as more traditional customer engagement features.

The company's Valparaiso headquarters includes a "full-scale, functioning store" for employee training and product testing.

In 2025, the company announced plans to invest $100 million in new convenience stores, including new stores across the state of Indiana. As of January 2025, the company had 81 stores.

== Origin and expansion ==
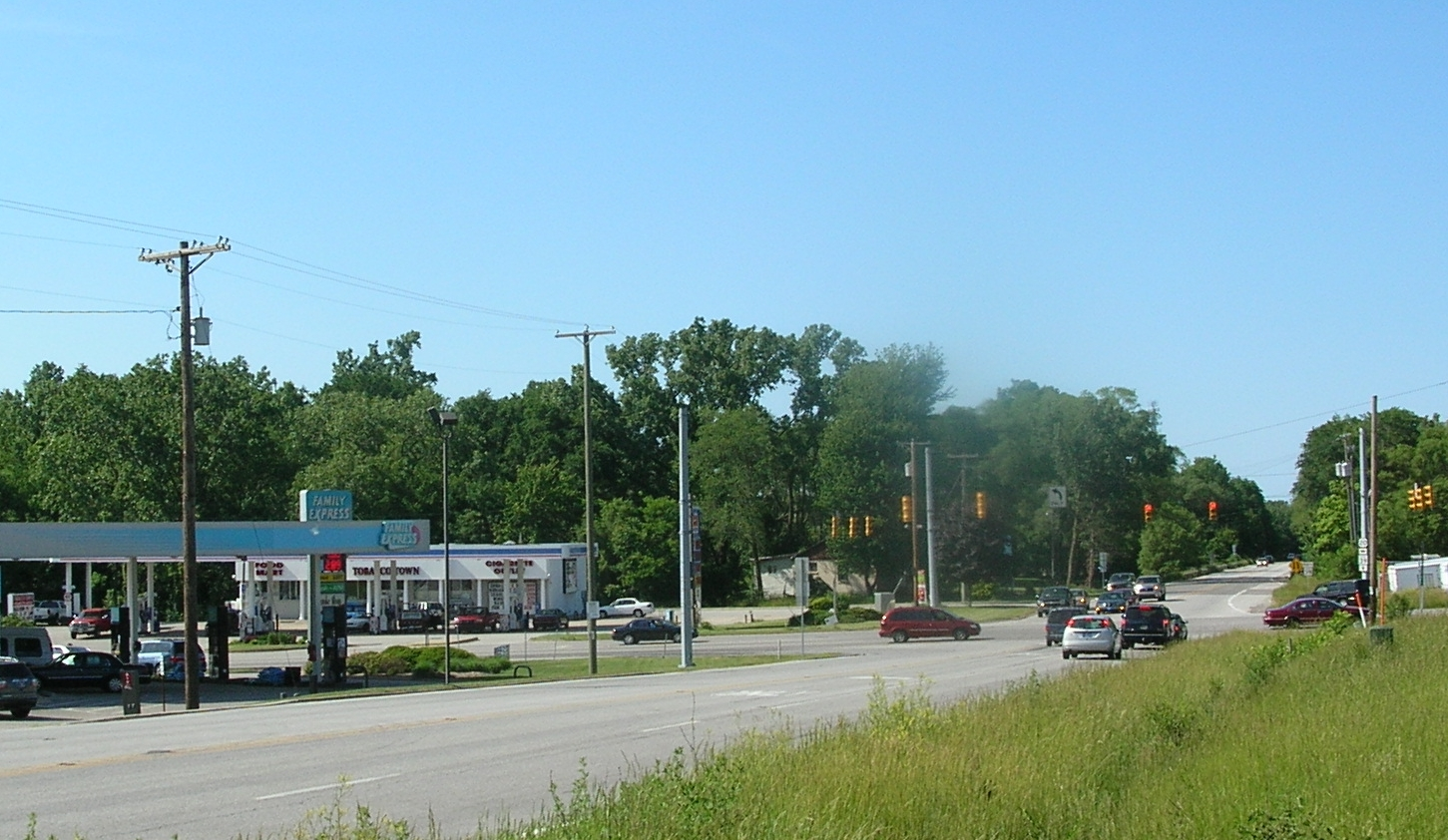
A Family Express at Springville on US Route 20.

The company was started by Gus Olympidis with a single location on Valparaiso's west side in 1975. The initial name of the stores was "Time Low", which changed to "Family Express" in 1987.

Originally a Northwest Indiana company, in 1999 the company purchased Carter Oil, giving it access to the Lafayette market and improved exposure on Interstate 65. It entered the suburban Indianapolis market in 2018. Plans for the Indianapolis expansion included new sites in Zionsville, Whitestown, and Carmel, with the Carmel location to be designed Art Deco style in conformity with local zoning standards.

== Controversies ==
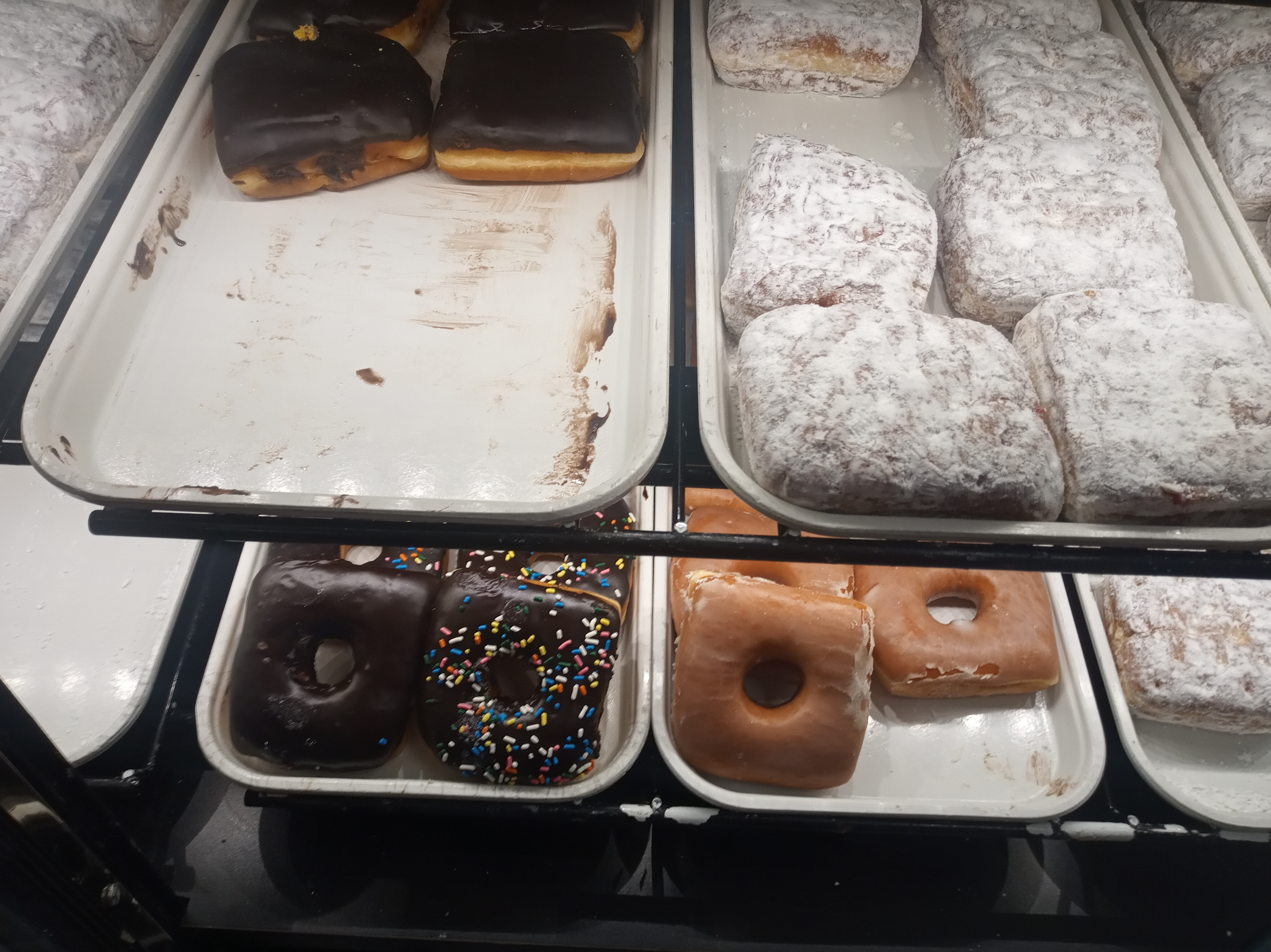
Family Express square donuts

From 2006 to 2018, Family Express was involved in a trademark dispute with Square Donuts of Terre Haute over Family Express's use of the phrase "square donuts" to describe its square donuts. Square Donuts sent a cease and desist letter to Family Express in 2006, which Family Express opposed on the ground that referring to a square donut as a "square donut" is purely descriptive. Square Donuts obtained state and federal trademark protection in 2012 and 2013, and the United States Patent and Trademark Office subsequently rejected Family Express's own trademark application due to likelihood of confusion with the Square Donuts mark.

In 2016, Family Express brought a declaratory judgment action in federal court to have the Square Donuts trademark invalidated on grounds of descriptiveness. In 2018, Family Express added a new argument, that Square Donuts had abandoned its mark by allowing third parties to use it. Later in 2018, the parties reached a settlement.

In 2019, after revelations of severe animal abuse at a confined animal feeding operation operated by Fair Oaks Farms, Family Express discontinued all Fairlife products, replacing them with Organic Valley. Family Express, which was joined by other companies including Jewel-Osco in withdrawing Fairlife products, issued a statement describing the abuse as "chilling".

== Recognition ==
In 2015, the company received the Convenience Store Decisions "Chain of the Year" award, described as "one of the most prestigious convenience retail awards in the United States." The award was presented by the CEO of RaceTrac Petroleum, who praised the company's "outstanding operations" and "ongoing commitment to convenience retail".

In 2019, Delish named Family Express the best local convenience store in Indiana.

In 2019, the National Advisory Group trade association gave Family Express CEO Gus Olympidis its NAG Lifetime Award for Convenience Retailing. The association cited his "indelible mark on the convenience retailing industry".

As of 2019, trade publication CSP Magazine ranked Family Express 91st in its "Top 202" convenience store listing, up from 99th place the previous year.

The company was named as a 2026 USA Today Top Workplace for its culture and low turnover rate with employees.
