= Plainfield High School =

Plainfield High School may refer to:

- Plainfield High School (Connecticut)
- Plainfield High School (Illinois)
- Plainfield South High School — Plainfield, Illinois
- Plainfield High School (Indiana)
- Nashua-Plainfield High School — Nashua, Iowa
- Plainfield High School (New Jersey) — Plainfield, New Jersey
- North Plainfield High School — North Plainfield, New Jersey
- South Plainfield High School — South Plainfield, New Jersey

== See also ==
- Plainfield Academy (disambiguation)
