= Haskell, Indiana =

Unincorporated community in Indiana, U.S.

Coordinates: 41°29′02″N 86°54′07″W

Haskell is an unincorporated community in LaPorte County, Indiana, in the United States.

== History ==
Haskell, originally called Haskell Station, had its start in the 1850s as a railroad town. The community was likely named for James Haskell, a pioneer settler. A post office was established at Haskell in 1857, and remained in operation until it was discontinued in 1937.
