= Scipio Township =

Scipio Township may refer to:

== Indiana ==
- Scipio Township, Allen County, Indiana
- Scipio Township, LaPorte County, Indiana

== Michigan ==
- Scipio Township, Michigan

== Ohio ==
- Scipio Township, Meigs County, Ohio
- Scipio Township, Seneca County, Ohio
