= Salem Heights, Indiana =

- Unincorporated community
- Location within Indiana Location within the United States
- Coordinates: 41°34′32″N 86°37′24″W
- Country: United States
- State: Indiana
- County: LaPorte
- Township: Pleasant
- Elevation: 745 ft (227 m)
- ZIP code: 46350
- FIPS code: 18-67500
- GNIS feature ID: 450479

Salem Heights is an unincorporated community in Pleasant Township, LaPorte County, Indiana.
