= Holmesville, Indiana =

- Unincorporated community
- Location within Indiana Location within the United States
- Coordinates: 41°35′59″N 86°52′52″W
- Country: United States
- State: Indiana
- County: LaPorte
- Township: New Durham
- Elevation: 771 ft (235 m)
- ZIP code: 46350
- FIPS code: 18-34355
- GNIS feature ID: 436338

Holmesville is an unincorporated community in New Durham Township, LaPorte County, Indiana.

== History ==
A post office was established at Holmesville in 1854, and remained in operation until it was discontinued in 1895. Holmesville was platted in 1855 by Hiram Holmes, and named for him.
