= Pinola, Indiana =

- Unincorporated community
- Location within Indiana Location within the United States
- Coordinates: 41°35′56″N 86°47′52″W
- Country: United States
- State: Indiana
- County: LaPorte
- Township: Scipio
- Elevation: 843 ft (257 m)
- ZIP code: 46350
- FIPS code: 18-60138
- GNIS feature ID: 450468

Pinola is an unincorporated community in Scipio Township, LaPorte County, Indiana.

It was named for the growth of pine trees.
