= Hanna Township, LaPorte County, Indiana =

Hanna Township
- Township
- Coordinates: 41°24′26″N 86°44′50″W
- Country: United States
- State: Indiana
- County: LaPorte

Government
  - Type: Indiana township

Area
  - Total: 26.52 sq mi (68.7 km^{2})
  - Land: 26.39 sq mi (68.3 km^{2})
  - Water: 0.13 sq mi (0.34 km^{2})
- Elevation: 682 ft (208 m)

Population (2020)
  - Total: 976
  - Density: 36.6/sq mi (14.1/km^{2})
- FIPS code: 18-31198
- GNIS feature ID: 453369

Hanna Township is one of twenty-one townships in LaPorte County, Indiana. As of the 2020 census, its population was 976 (up from 965 at 2010) and it contained 409 housing units. It contains the census-designated place of Hanna.

== Geography ==
According to the 2010 census, the township has a total area of 26.52 square miles (68.7 km^{2}), of which 26.39 square miles (68.3 km^{2}) (or 99.51%) is land and 0.13 square miles (0.34 km^{2}) (or 0.49%) is water.
