= Plainfield, Michigan =

Plainfield may refer to a few places in the U.S. state of Michigan:

- Plainfield, Livingston County, Michigan
- Plainfield Township, Iosco County, Michigan
- Plainfield Township, Kent County, Michigan
