= Noble Township, LaPorte County, Indiana =

Noble Township
- Township
- Coordinates: 41°28′23″N 86°45′45″W
- Country: United States
- State: Indiana
- County: LaPorte

Government
  - Type: Indiana township

Area
  - Total: 31.33 sq mi (81.1 km^{2})
  - Land: 31.3 sq mi (81 km^{2})
  - Water: 0.03 sq mi (0.078 km^{2})
- Elevation: 712 ft (217 m)

Population (2020)
  - Total: 1,599
  - Density: 51.9/sq mi (20.0/km^{2})
- FIPS code: 18-54090
- GNIS feature ID: 453671

Noble Township is one of twenty-one townships in LaPorte County, Indiana. As of the 2020 census, its population was 1,599 (down from 1,625 at 2010) and it contained 634 housing units.

Noble Township was established in 1836.

== Geography ==
According to the 2010 census, the township has a total area of 31.33 square miles (81.1 km^{2}), of which 31.3 square miles (81 km^{2}) (or 99.90%) is land and 0.03 square miles (0.078 km^{2}) (or 0.10%) is water.
