= Stillwell, Indiana =

- Unincorporated community
- Location within Indiana Location within the United States
- Coordinates: 41°33′18″N 86°36′08″W
- Country: United States
- State: Indiana
- County: LaPorte
- Township: Pleasant
- Elevation: 735 ft (224 m)
- ZIP code: 46574
- FIPS code: 18-73214
- GNIS feature ID: 2830446

Stillwell is an unincorporated community in Pleasant Township, LaPorte County, Indiana.

== History ==
A post office was established at Stillwell in 1870, and remained in operation until it was discontinued in 1963. The community was named for Thomas Stillwell, a pioneer settler.

== Demographics ==
Historical population
Census	Pop.	Note	%±
2023 (est.)	10

The United States Census Bureau defined Stillwell as a census designated place in the 2022 American Community Survey.
