= Wills Township, LaPorte County, Indiana =

Wills Township
- Township
- Coordinates: 41°39′N 86°33′W
- Country: United States
- State: Indiana
- County: LaPorte

Government
  - Type: Indiana township

Area
  - Total: 29.8 sq mi (77 km^{2})
  - Land: 29.28 sq mi (75.8 km^{2})
  - Water: 0.52 sq mi (1.3 km^{2})
- Elevation: 758 ft (231 m)

Population (2020)
  - Total: 2,098
  - Density: 72.1/sq mi (27.8/km^{2})
- FIPS code: 18-84554
- GNIS feature ID: 454060

Wills Township is one of twenty-one townships in LaPorte County, Indiana. As of the 2020 census, its population was 2,098 (down from 2,110 at 2010) and it contained 833 housing units.

== History ==
Wills Township was established in 1834. It was named for John Wills, a pioneer settler.

== Geography ==
According to the 2010 census, the township has a total area of 29.8 square miles (77 km^{2}), of which 29.28 square miles (75.8 km^{2}) (or 98.26%) is land and 0.52 square miles (1.3 km^{2}) (or 1.74%) is water.
