= Springville, LaPorte County, Indiana =

Unincorporated community in LaPorte County, Indiana, United States

Springville, Indiana
- Unincorporated community
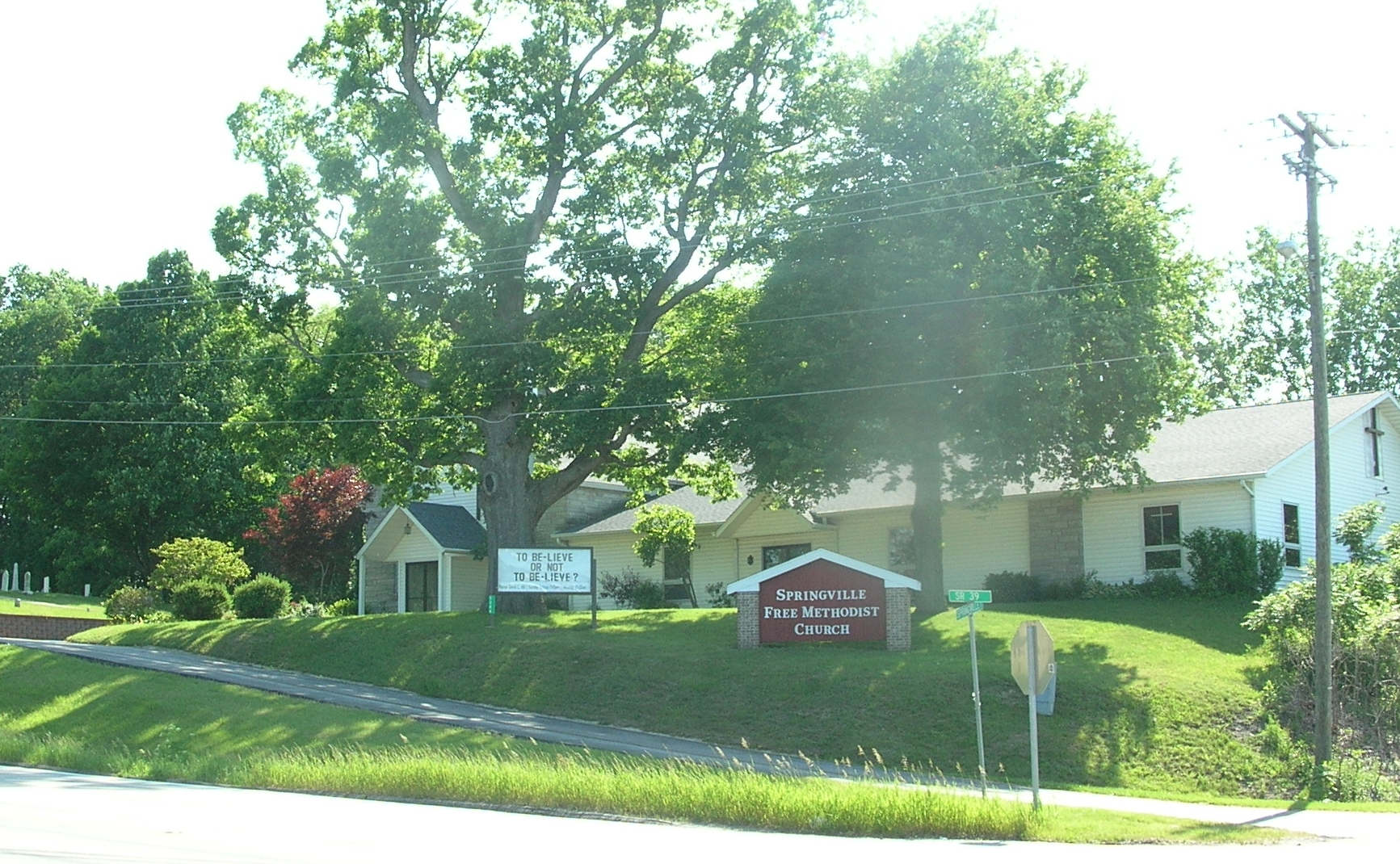
- The Springville Free Methodist Church, built in 1891.

- Location within Indiana Location within the United States
- Coordinates: 41°41′07″N 86°44′12″W
- Country: United States
- State: Indiana
- County: LaPorte
- Township: Springfield
- Elevation: 771 ft (235 m)
- ZIP code: 46350
- Area code: 219
- GNIS feature ID: 444019

Springville is an unincorporated community in Springfield Township in northern LaPorte County, Indiana, at the intersection of U.S. Route 20 and Indiana Route 39, less than one mile north of the LaPorte exit on the Indiana Toll Road. It took its name from a large spring that formerly flowed near the town.

Springville is the site of the Springville Free Methodist Church, built in 1891. Businesses in the town include two large gas stations serving highway travelers, and a large mobile home park. Springville is in the Michigan City Area Schools school district.

The Springville area was originally almost entirely forest, but is now a mixture of forest and farmland. The town stands on a low hill that divides the watershed of Trail Creek from the Galena River, which rises a short distance to the east in the Springfield Fen, which provides habitat for a variety of rare plants and animals.

== History ==
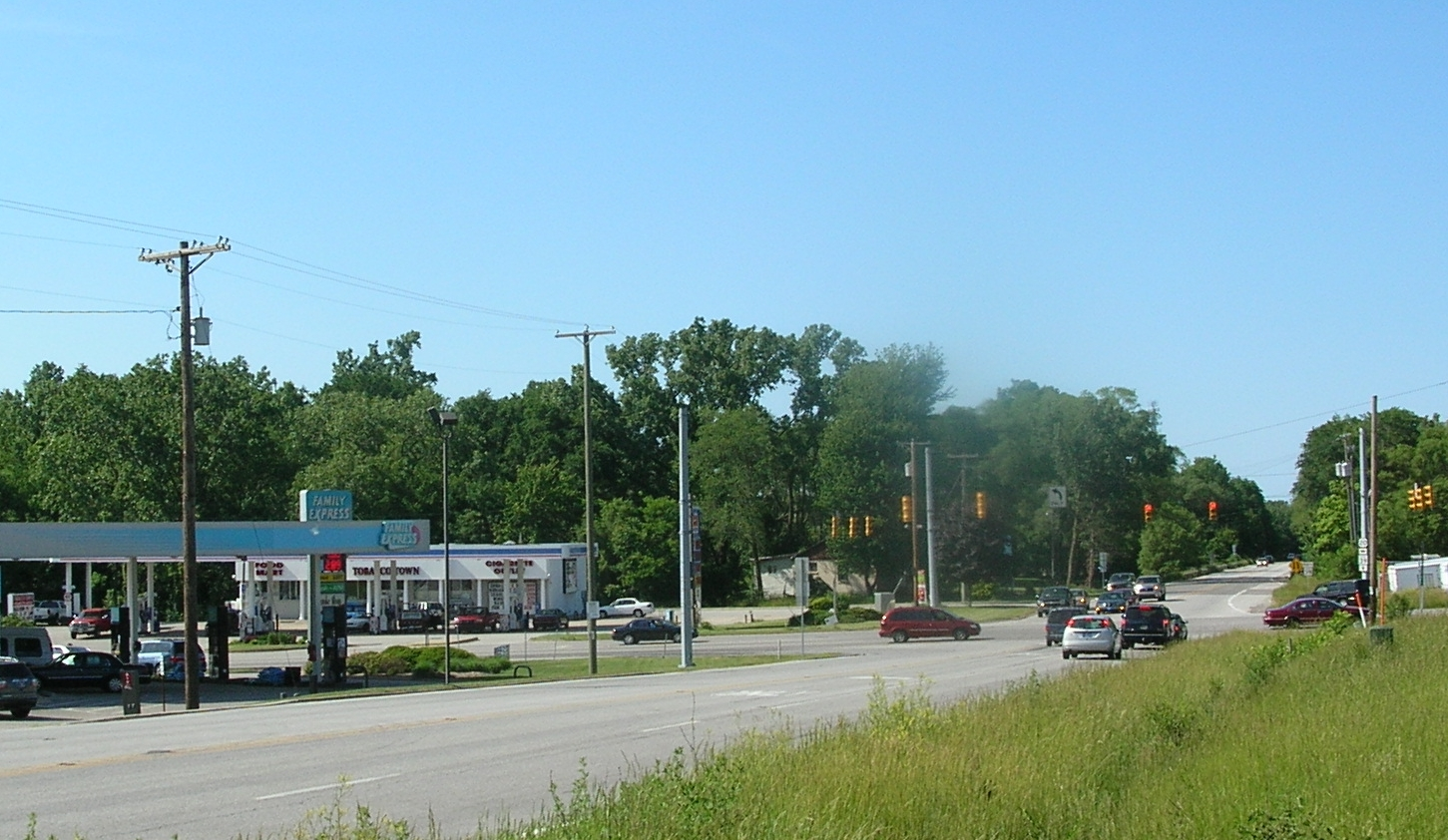
Springville intersection from the south, with Family Express gas station on right.

Springville was first settled in 1831. It was surveyed in 1833 and a plat of the community was filed on August 19, 1835. It lay on the Michigan Road, which ran from the Ohio River to Michigan City, Indiana. In the mid-19th century, it was the site of businesses including a mill, sawmill, schoolhouse, tannery, shoemaker and general store, as well as both Baptist and Methodist congregations. Springville also had a post office from 1835 to 1863.

During the 1840s, many locals hoped that Springville would become the county seat. The town's ambitions of becoming a location of importance ended, however, when the Lake Shore and Michigan Southern Railway passed through LaPorte instead of Springville. In the 1850s, a company was organized in Springville to build a plank road from Michigan City to South Bend, but this too was unsuccessful.

Later, however, the LaCrosse Division of the Pere Marquette Railroad, running from New Buffalo to LaCrosse was built through the town and stopped at Springville. The Pere Marquette right-of-way was ultimately acquired by the Chesapeake and Ohio Railway, and was abandoned in the late 20th century.
