= Springfield Township, LaPorte County, Indiana =

Springfield Township
- Township
- Coordinates: 41°43′10″N 86°45′39″W
- Country: United States
- State: Indiana
- County: LaPorte

Government
  - Type: Indiana township

Area
  - Total: 33.41 sq mi (86.5 km^{2})
  - Land: 33.29 sq mi (86.2 km^{2})
  - Water: 0.12 sq mi (0.31 km^{2})
- Elevation: 666 ft (203 m)

Population (2020)
  - Total: 3,770
  - Density: 121.5/sq mi (46.9/km^{2})
- FIPS code: 18-72170
- GNIS feature ID: 453867

Springfield Township is one of twenty-one townships in LaPorte County, Indiana. As of the 2020 census, its population was 3,770 (down from 4,045 at 2010) and it contained 1,574 housing units.

Springfield Township was established in 1835.

== Geography ==
According to the 2010 census, the township has a total area of 33.41 square miles (86.5 km^{2}), of which 33.29 square miles (86.2 km^{2}) (or 99.64%) is land and 0.12 square miles (0.31 km^{2}) (or 0.36%) is water.

Communities in the township include the incorporated town of Michiana Shores and the unincorporated community of Springville.
