= Wellsboro, Indiana =

- Unincorporated community and Census designated place
- Location within Indiana Location within the United States
- Coordinates: 41°29′41″N 86°45′52″W
- Country: United States
- State: Indiana
- County: LaPorte
- Township: Noble
- Elevation: 751 ft (229 m)
- ZIP code: 46382
- FIPS code: 18-82250
- GNIS feature ID: 2830448

Wellsboro is an unincorporated community in Noble Township, LaPorte County, Indiana.

== History ==
Wellsboro was laid out in 1875 at the junction of two railroads. It was named for its founders, Charles F. and Theodore H. Wells. Wellsboro (originally spelled Wellsborough) contained a post office from 1877 until 1955.

== Demographics ==
Historical population
Census	Pop.	Note	%±
2023 (est.)	532

The United States Census Bureau defined Wellsboro as a census designated place in the 2022 American Community Survey.
