= Wanatah, Indiana =

- Town
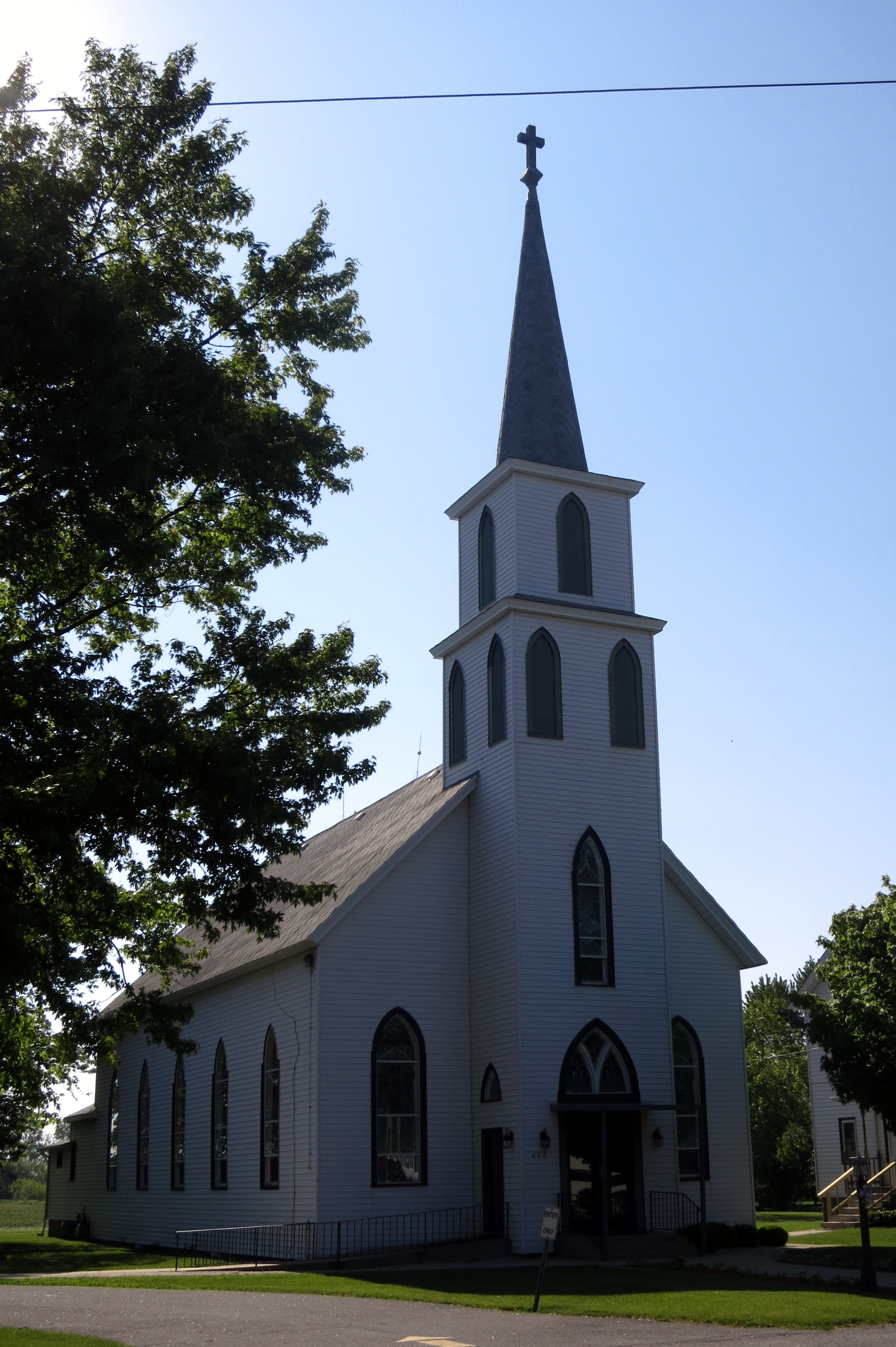
- Sacred Heart Church on North Ohio Street

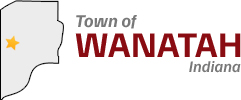
- Logo

- Location of Wanatah in LaPorte County, Indiana.
- Coordinates: 41°25′49″N 86°52′55″W
- Country: United States
- State: Indiana
- County: LaPorte
- Township: Clinton, Cass

Area
  - Total: 1.40 sq mi (3.62 km^{2})
  - Land: 1.40 sq mi (3.62 km^{2})
  - Water: 0 sq mi (0.00 km^{2})
- Elevation: 728 ft (222 m)

Population (2020)
  - Total: 1,009
  - Density: 721.0/sq mi (278.38/km^{2})
- Time zone: UTC-6 (Central (CST))
  - Summer (DST): UTC-5 (CDT)
- ZIP code: 46390
- Area code: 219
- FIPS code: 18-80018
- GNIS feature ID: 2397721
- Website: wanatah-in.gov

Wanatah is a town in LaPorte County, Indiana, United States. As of the 2020 census, Wanatah had a population of 1,009.

== History ==
The first settlements were made at Wanatah in the 1850s when the railroad was extended to that point. Wanatah was platted in 1865. It was named for Wanata, a Native American leader.

== Geography ==
According to the 2010 census, Wanatah has a total area of 1.42 square miles (3.68 km^{2}), all land.

=== Climate ===
Climate data for Wanatah, Indiana (1991–2020 normals, extremes 1961–present)
Month	Jan	Feb	Mar	Apr	May	Jun	Jul	Aug	Sep	Oct	Nov	Dec	Year
Record high °F (°C)	66 (19)	72 (22)	87 (31)	90 (32)	98 (37)	105 (41)	102 (39)	101 (38)	96 (36)	89 (32)	83 (28)	70 (21)	105 (41)
Mean maximum °F (°C)	53.7 (12.1)	56.9 (13.8)	70.3 (21.3)	80.5 (26.9)	88.9 (31.6)	93.3 (34.1)	93.4 (34.1)	91.6 (33.1)	90.4 (32.4)	82.9 (28.3)	68.7 (20.4)	57.0 (13.9)	95.3 (35.2)
Mean daily maximum °F (°C)	31.6 (−0.2)	35.4 (1.9)	46.6 (8.1)	59.2 (15.1)	70.7 (21.5)	80.3 (26.8)	83.1 (28.4)	81.2 (27.3)	76.1 (24.5)	63.4 (17.4)	48.7 (9.3)	36.8 (2.7)	59.4 (15.2)
Daily mean °F (°C)	23.4 (−4.8)	26.9 (−2.8)	36.9 (2.7)	48.1 (8.9)	59.9 (15.5)	69.7 (20.9)	72.4 (22.4)	70.3 (21.3)	63.7 (17.6)	52.0 (11.1)	39.7 (4.3)	29.2 (−1.6)	49.4 (9.7)
Mean daily minimum °F (°C)	15.3 (−9.3)	18.3 (−7.6)	27.2 (−2.7)	36.9 (2.7)	49.0 (9.4)	59.1 (15.1)	61.7 (16.5)	59.3 (15.2)	51.3 (10.7)	40.5 (4.7)	30.8 (−0.7)	21.5 (−5.8)	39.2 (4.0)
Mean minimum °F (°C)	−8.1 (−22.3)	−3.0 (−19.4)	6.6 (−14.1)	20.6 (−6.3)	32.4 (0.2)	42.5 (5.8)	47.2 (8.4)	46.2 (7.9)	35.8 (2.1)	25.3 (−3.7)	15.1 (−9.4)	0.3 (−17.6)	−11.8 (−24.3)
Record low °F (°C)	−26 (−32)	−21 (−29)	−13 (−25)	10 (−12)	26 (−3)	33 (1)	40 (4)	38 (3)	27 (−3)	18 (−8)	2 (−17)	−20 (−29)	−26 (−32)
Average precipitation inches (mm)	2.12 (54)	1.88 (48)	2.35 (60)	3.78 (96)	4.00 (102)	4.71 (120)	4.18 (106)	4.38 (111)	3.28 (83)	3.78 (96)	2.88 (73)	2.11 (54)	39.45 (1,002)
Average snowfall inches (cm)	10.6 (27)	8.8 (22)	5.1 (13)	0.8 (2.0)	0.0 (0.0)	0.0 (0.0)	0.0 (0.0)	0.0 (0.0)	0.0 (0.0)	0.1 (0.25)	1.4 (3.6)	6.8 (17)	33.6 (85)
Average precipitation days (≥ 0.01 in)	10.8	9.2	11.2	12.5	12.9	11.7	10.6	10.4	9.5	11.6	11.2	11.1	132.7
Average snowy days (≥ 0.1 in)	7.4	6.1	3.4	0.7	0.0	0.0	0.0	0.0	0.0	0.1	1.2	4.9	23.8
Source: NOAA

== Demographics ==
Historical population
Census	Pop.	Note	%±
1880	372		—
1970	773		—
1980	879		13.7%
1990	852		−3.1%
2000	1,013		18.9%
2010	1,048		3.5%
2020	1,009		−3.7%
Source: US Census Bureau

=== 2010 census ===
As of the census of 2010, there were 1,048 people, 436 households, and 295 families living in the town. The population density was 738.0 inhabitants per square mile (284.9/km^{2}). There were 459 housing units at an average density of 323.2 per square mile (124.8/km^{2}). The racial makeup of the town was 96.9% White, 0.1% African American, 1.0% Native American, 0.2% Asian, 0.1% Pacific Islander, 0.2% from other races, and 1.5% from two or more races. Hispanic or Latino of any race were 3.0% of the population.

There were 436 households, of which 29.8% had children under the age of 18 living with them, 55.7% were married couples living together, 8.0% had a female householder with no husband present, 3.9% had a male householder with no wife present, and 32.3% were non-families. 26.1% of all households were made up of individuals, and 9.9% had someone living alone who was 65 years of age or older. The average household size was 2.40 and the average family size was 2.91.

The median age in the town was 40.2 years. 22.9% of residents were under the age of 18; 5.5% were between the ages of 18 and 24; 26.9% were from 25 to 44; 32.1% were from 45 to 64; and 12.5% were 65 years of age or older. The gender makeup of the town was 50.0% male and 50.0% female.

=== 2000 census ===
As of the census of 2000, there were 1,013 people, 399 households, and 298 families living in the town. The population density was 739.2 inhabitants per square mile (285.4/km^{2}). There were 411 housing units at an average density of 299.9 per square mile (115.8/km^{2}). The racial makeup of the town was 98.03% White, 0.10% African American, 0.30% Native American, 0.20% Asian, 0.10% from other races, and 1.28% from two or more races. Hispanic or Latino of any race were 2.07% of the population.

There were 399 households, out of which 31.6% had children under the age of 18 living with them, 63.7% were married couples living together, 6.8% had a female householder with no husband present, and 25.3% were non-families. 21.6% of all households were made up of individuals, and 11.0% had someone living alone who was 65 years of age or older. The average household size was 2.54 and the average family size was 2.95.

In the town, the population was spread out, with 24.6% under the age of 18, 6.8% from 18 to 24, 30.3% from 25 to 44, 25.8% from 45 to 64, and 12.5% who were 65 years of age or older. The median age was 37 years. For every 100 females, there were 101.8 males. For every 100 females age 18 and over, there were 99.0 males.

The median income for a household in the town was $50,625, and the median income for a family was $54,554. Males had a median income of $41,667 versus $26,250 for females. The per capita income for the town was $19,945. About 3.6% of families and 5.3% of the population were below the poverty line, including 8.1% of those under age 18 and 5.8% of those age 65 or over.

== Education ==
The school district for areas south of U.S. Highway 30 is Tri-Township Consolidated School Corporation. For areas north of Highway 30, the school district is South Central Community School Corporation.

The town is served by the Wanatah Public Library. Wanatah residents may also request a free library card from any La Porte County Public Library branch.

== Notable person ==
- Sean Manaea, baseball player
