= Rolling Prairie, Indiana =

- Census-designated place
- Location in LaPorte County, Indiana

- Location within Indiana Location within the United States
- Coordinates: 41°40′23″N 86°37′26″W
- Country: United States
- State: Indiana
- County: LaPorte
- Township: Kankakee

Area
  - Total: 1.07 sq mi (2.77 km^{2})
  - Land: 1.06 sq mi (2.74 km^{2})
  - Water: 0.015 sq mi (0.04 km^{2})
- Elevation: 820 ft (250 m)

Population (2020)
  - Total: 562
  - Density: 532.2/sq mi (205.48/km^{2})
- ZIP code: 46371
- FIPS code: 18-65736
- GNIS feature ID: 2629775

Rolling Prairie is an unincorporated community and census-designated place (CDP) in Kankakee Township, LaPorte County, Indiana, United States. As of the 2020 census, it had a population of 562.

== History ==
The first cabin was built here in 1831 by Ezekiel Provolt. More settlers arrived, built cabins and named the settlement "Nauvoo". On November 26, 1853, the village was platted by J. W. Walker and named "Portland". The name of "Rolling Prairie", descriptive of the undulating terrain, was later adopted by one of the railroad companies operating through the town.

Rolling Prairie had a stop on the South Shore Line until 1994, when it was closed along with several other flag stops with low ridership.

== Geography ==
Rolling Prairie is located in northeastern LaPorte County in the northeast part of Kankakee Township. U.S. Route 20 passes through the southern side of the community, leading east 19 miles (31 km) to South Bend and west 15 miles (24 km) to Michigan City. Indiana State Road 2 passes just south of Rolling Prairie, leading southwest 7 miles (11 km) to La Porte, the county seat.

According to the U.S. Census Bureau, the Rolling Prairie CDP has an area of 1.1 square miles (2.8 km^{2}), of which 0.02 square miles (0.04 km^{2}), or 1.39%, are water.

== Education ==
The school district is New Prairie United School Corporation. Rolling Prairie Elementary School occupies the building that was previously Rolling Prairie High School before the high school was merged with New Carlisle High School to form New Prairie High School. The elementary is one of three elementary schools in the New Prairie United School Corporation.

Rolling Prairie has a public library, a branch of the La Porte County Public Library.

== Demographics ==
Historical population
Census	Pop.	Note	%±
2020	562		—
U.S. Decennial Census
