= Plainfield Township =

Plainfield Township may refer to:

- Plainfield Township, Will County, Illinois
- Plainfield Township, Iosco County, Michigan
- Plainfield Township, Kent County, Michigan
- Plainfield Township, Union County, New Jersey, now the city of Plainfield
- Plainfield Township, Pennsylvania
- Plainfield Township, Brule County, South Dakota, in Brule County, South Dakota
