= Hudson Township, LaPorte County, Indiana =

Hudson Township
- Township
- Coordinates: 41°43′26″N 86°33′13″W
- Country: United States
- State: Indiana
- County: LaPorte

Government
  - Type: Indiana township

Area
  - Total: 13.63 sq mi (35.3 km^{2})
  - Land: 12.74 sq mi (33.0 km^{2})
  - Water: 0.89 sq mi (2.3 km^{2})
- Elevation: 804 ft (245 m)

Population (2020)
  - Total: 1,832
  - Density: 147.8/sq mi (57.1/km^{2})
- FIPS code: 18-35068
- GNIS feature ID: 453422

Hudson Township is one of twenty-one townships in LaPorte County, Indiana, United States. As of the 2020 census, its population was 1,832 (down from 1,883 at 2010) and it contained 962 housing units. It contains the census-designated place of Hudson Lake.

Hudson Township was established in 1836.

== Geography ==
According to the 2010 census, the township has a total area of 13.63 square miles (35.3 km^{2}), of which 12.74 square miles (33.0 km^{2}) (or 93.47%) is land and 0.89 square miles (2.3 km^{2}) (or 6.53%) is water.
