= La Crosse, Indiana =

Town in LaPorte County, Indiana, US

Town of La Crosse, Indiana
- Town
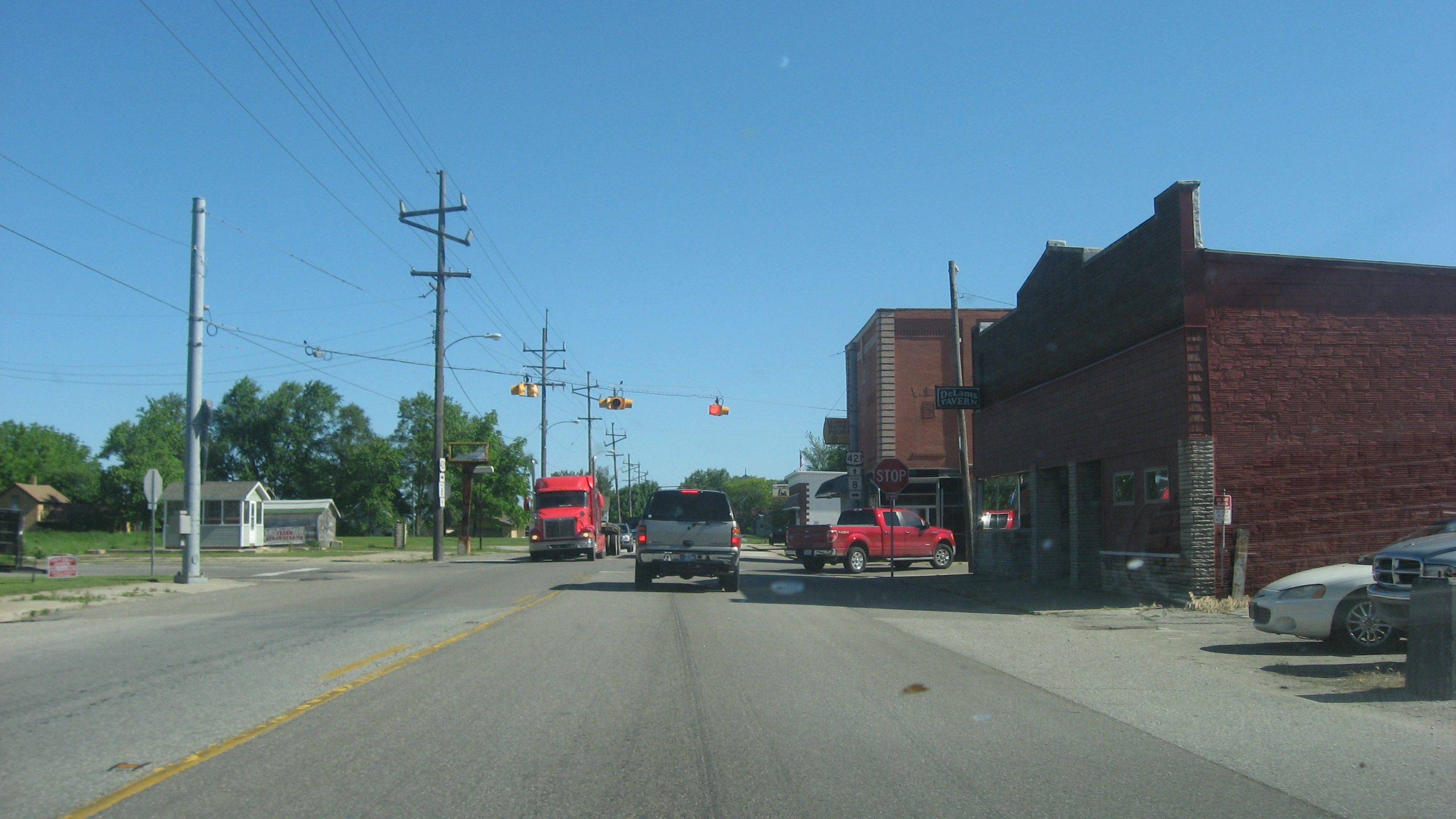
- Downtown buildings

- Location of La Crosse in LaPorte County, Indiana.
- Coordinates: 41°19′04″N 86°53′23″W
- Country: United States
- State: Indiana
- County: LaPorte

Area
  - Total: 0.57 sq mi (1.47 km^{2})
  - Land: 0.57 sq mi (1.47 km^{2})
  - Water: 0 sq mi (0.00 km^{2})
- Elevation: 676 ft (206 m)

Population (2020)
  - Total: 555
  - Density: 975.9/sq mi (376.81/km^{2})
- Time zone: UTC-6 (CST)
  - Summer (DST): UTC-5 (CDT)
- ZIP code: 46348
- Area code: 219
- FIPS code: 18-40662
- GNIS feature ID: 2396698

La Crosse is a town in LaPorte County, Indiana, United States. As of the 2020 census, La Crosse had a population of 555. It is included in the Michigan City, Indiana-La Porte, Indiana Metropolitan Statistical Area.

== History ==
La Crosse is derived from the French meaning "the crossing", and it was so named from its location at the junction or crossing of five railroads. The five railroads were:

- Monon Railroad
- Chicago and Indiana Coal Railway (later the Chicago and Eastern Illinois and the Chicago, Attica and Southern)
- Chicago and West Michigan Railway (later the Pere Marquette)
- Pittsburgh, Cincinnati, Chicago and St. Louis Railroad (later the Pennsylvania Railroad)
- Chicago, Cincinnati and Louisville Railroad (later the C&O)

Since 2004, La Crosse has been the headquarters of the Chesapeake and Indiana Railroad, which owns portions of former C&O and Pere Marquette trackage.

The La Crosse post office opened in 1921.

== Geography ==
According to the United States Census Bureau, La Crosse has a total area of 0.51 square miles (1.32 km^{2}), all land.

== Demographics ==
Historical population
Census	Pop.	Note	%±
1930	568		—
1940	574		1.1%
1950	618		7.7%
1960	632		2.3%
1970	696		10.1%
1980	713		2.4%
1990	677		−5.0%
2000	561		−17.1%
2010	551		−1.8%
2020	555		0.7%
U.S. Decennial Census

=== 2010 census ===
As of the census of 2010, there were 551 people, 227 households, and 157 families living in the town. The population density was 1,039.6 inhabitants per square mile (401.4/km^{2}). There were 243 housing units at an average density of 458.5 per square mile (177.0/km^{2}). The racial makeup of the town was 99.5% White, 0.2% African American, and 0.4% from two or more races. Hispanic or Latino of any race were 1.8% of the population.

There were 227 households, of which 29.1% had children under the age of 18 living with them, 52.9% were married couples living together, 9.7% had a female householder with no husband present, 6.6% had a male householder with no wife present, and 30.8% were non-families. 26.0% of all households were made up of individuals, and 11.9% had someone living alone who was 65 years of age or older. The average household size was 2.43 and the average family size was 2.91.

The median age in the town was 36.4 years. 22.7% of residents were under the age of 18; 8.7% were between the ages of 18 and 24; 27.8% were from 25 to 44; 30% were from 45 to 64; and 10.7% were 65 years of age or older. The gender makeup of the town was 49.2% male and 50.8% female.

=== 2000 census ===
As of the census of 2000, there were 561 people, 221 households, and 152 families living in the town. The population density was 1,040.0 inhabitants per square mile (401.5/km^{2}). There were 234 housing units at an average density of 433.8 per square mile (167.5/km^{2}). The racial makeup of the town was 97.86% White, 0.18% African American, 0.36% Native American, 0.53% Asian, 0.18% Pacific Islander, and 0.89% from two or more races. Hispanic or Latino of any race were 2.50% of the population.

There were 221 households, out of which 31.7% had children under the age of 18 living with them, 59.3% were married couples living together, 7.2% had a female householder with no husband present, and 31.2% were non-families. 28.5% of all households were made up of individuals, and 13.1% had someone living alone who was 65 years of age or older. The average household size was 2.54 and the average family size was 3.10.

In the town, the population was spread out, with 26.9% under the age of 18, 7.3% from 18 to 24, 28.9% from 25 to 44, 22.1% from 45 to 64, and 14.8% who were 65 years of age or older. The median age was 37 years. For every 100 females, there were 89.5 males. For every 100 females age 18 and over, there were 86.4 males.

The median income for a household in the town was $36,667, and the median income for a family was $50,278. Males had a median income of $34,583 versus $21,513 for females. The per capita income for the town was $17,962. None of the families and 1.5% of the population were living below the poverty line, including no under eighteens and 2.4% of those over 64.

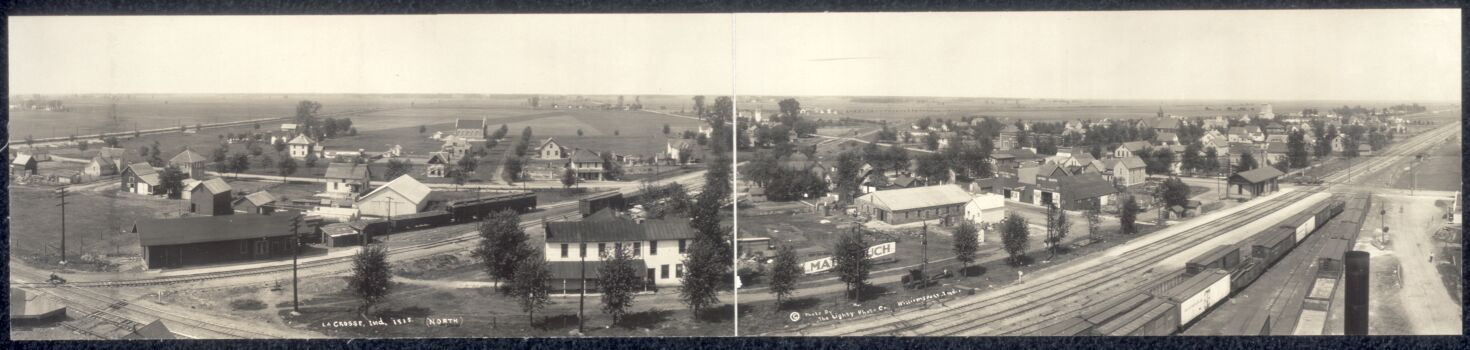
Panoramic View of La Crosse, Indiana, 1915, looking south from the north

== Education ==
The school district is Tri-Township Consolidated School Corporation.

The town has a lending library, the La Crosse Public Library.
