= Hanna, Indiana =

- Census-designated place
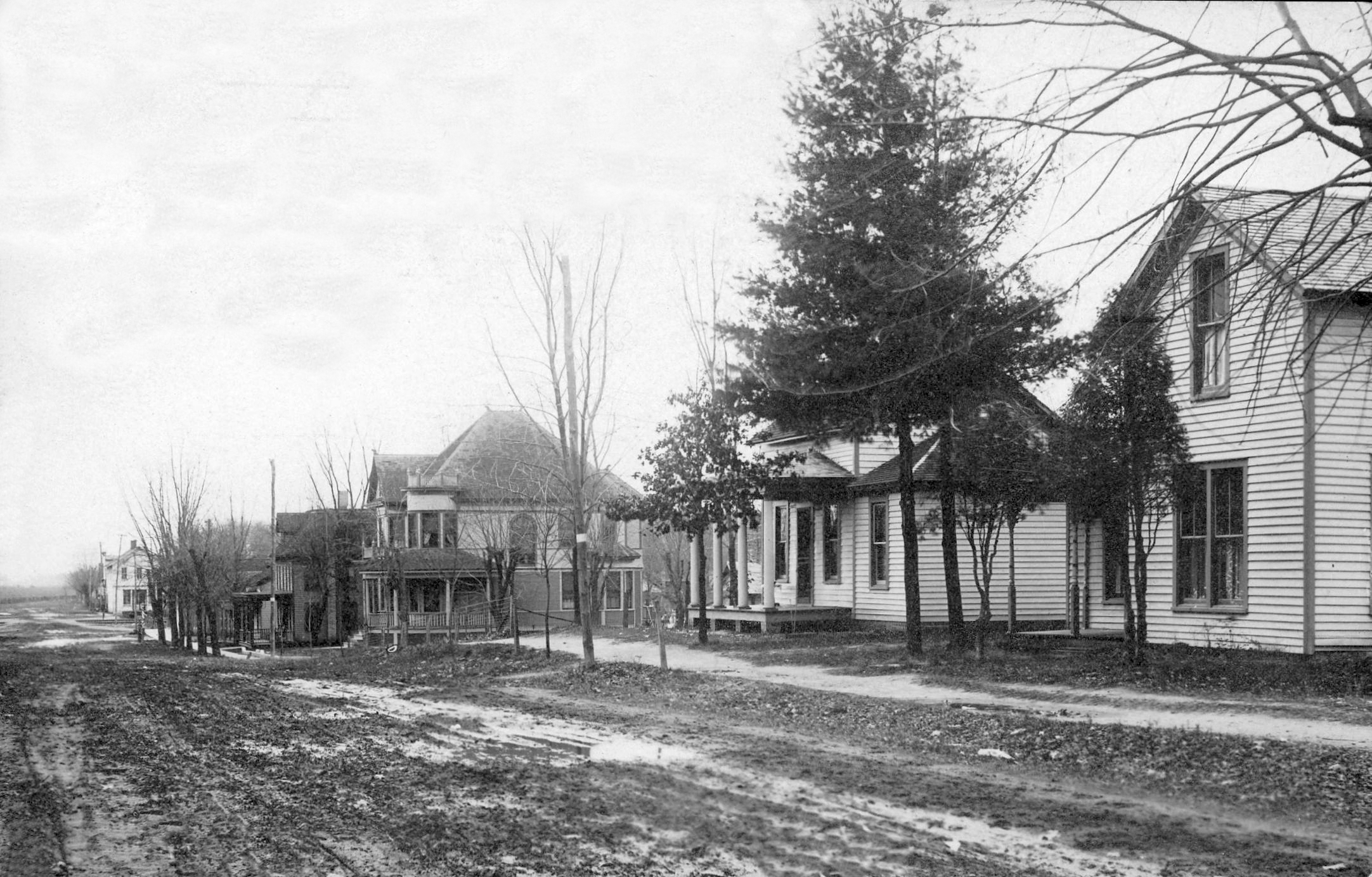
- Hanna, 1910

- Location in LaPorte County, Indiana

- Location within Indiana Location within the United States
- Coordinates: 41°24′43″N 86°46′46″W
- Country: United States
- State: Indiana
- County: LaPorte
- Township: Hanna
- Platted: 1858

Area
  - Total: 0.98 sq mi (2.53 km^{2})
  - Land: 0.98 sq mi (2.53 km^{2})
  - Water: 0 sq mi (0.00 km^{2})
- Elevation: 709 ft (216 m)

Population (2020)
  - Total: 450
  - Density: 460.1/sq mi (177.64/km^{2})
- Time zone: UTC-5 (Eastern)
  - Summer (DST): UTC-4 (EDT)
- ZIP code: 46340
- FIPS code: 18-31180
- GNIS feature ID: 2629779

Hanna is an unincorporated community and census-designated place in Hanna Township, LaPorte County, Indiana, United States. As of the 2020 census, Hanna had a population of 450.

== History ==
Hanna was laid out in 1858. It was named for an Indiana judge with the surname Hanna.

== Geography ==
Hanna is located in southern LaPorte County, in the western part of Hanna Township. U.S. Route 30 (Lincoln Highway) passes through the north side of the community, leading west 16 miles (26 km) to Valparaiso and east 25 miles (40 km) to Plymouth.

According to the United States Census Bureau, the Hanna CDP has an area of 0.97 square miles (2.5 km^{2}), all of it recorded as land.

== Demographics ==
Historical population
| Census | Pop. | Note | %± |
|---|---|---|---|
| 2010 | 463 | | — |
| 2020 | 450 | | −2.8% |
U.S. Decennial Census

The population in 2010 was 463.

== Education ==
The school district is South Central Community School Corporation.

== Arts and culture ==
Hanna has a branch of the La Porte County Public Library.
