= Plainfield Academy =

Plainfield Academy may refer to:

- Plainfield Academy for the Arts and Advanced Studies in Plainfield, New Jersey
- Plainfield Academy in Plainfield Community Consolidated School District 202 in Illinois
- Plainfield Academy, an elite boarding school that was located in Plainfield, Connecticut
