= Kankakee Township, LaPorte County, Indiana =

Kankakee Township
- Township
- Coordinates: 41°38′55″N 86°39′01″W
- Country: United States
- State: Indiana
- County: LaPorte

Government
  - Type: Indiana township

Area
  - Total: 30.69 sq mi (79.5 km^{2})
  - Land: 30.55 sq mi (79.1 km^{2})
  - Water: 0.14 sq mi (0.36 km^{2})
- Elevation: 761 ft (232 m)

Population (2020)
  - Total: 4,739
  - Density: 158.1/sq mi (61.0/km^{2})
- FIPS code: 18-39186
- GNIS feature ID: 453521

Kankakee Township is one of twenty-one townships in LaPorte County, Indiana. As of the 2020 census, its population was 4,739 (down from 4,830 at 2010) and it contained 1,579 housing units.

The first settlements were made in Kankakee Township in the 1830s. The northeast corner of LaPorte, Indiana, is located within the southwestern corner of the township, as is the census-designated place of Rolling Prairie.

== Geography ==
According to the 2010 census, the township has a total area of 30.69 square miles (79.5 km^{2}), of which 30.55 square miles (79.1 km^{2}) (or 99.54%) is land and 0.14 square miles (0.36 km^{2}) (or 0.46%) is water.
