= Plainfield, St. Joseph County, Indiana =

Plainfield, Indiana
- Unincorporated community
- Location within Indiana Location within the United States
- Coordinates: 41°42′29″N 86°28′36″W
- Country: United States
- State: Indiana
- County: St. Joseph
- Township: Olive
- Elevation: 751 ft (229 m)
- ZIP code: 46552
- FIPS code: 18-60255
- GNIS feature ID: 441218

Plainfield is an unincorporated community in St. Joseph County, Indiana, United States. It is along U.S. Route 20 in the north-central part of Olive Township and is bordered to the south and west by the town of New Carlisle. Via US-20, Plainfield is 13 miles (21 km) west of South Bend and 23 miles (37 km) east of Michigan City.
