= Clinton Township, LaPorte County, Indiana =

Clinton Township
- Township
- Coordinates: 41°28′43″N 86°52′32″W
- Country: United States
- State: Indiana
- County: LaPorte

Government
  - Type: Indiana township

Area
  - Total: 34.45 sq mi (89.2 km^{2})
  - Land: 34.42 sq mi (89.1 km^{2})
  - Water: 0.03 sq mi (0.078 km^{2})
- Elevation: 761 ft (232 m)

Population (2020)
  - Total: 1,551
  - Density: 43.8/sq mi (16.9/km^{2})
- FIPS code: 18-13744
- GNIS feature ID: 453232

Clinton Township is one of twenty-one townships in LaPorte County, Indiana. As of the 2020 census, its population was 1,551 (up from 1,507 at 2010) and it contained 607 housing units.

Clinton Township was established in 1836.

== Geography ==
According to the 2010 census, the township has a total area of 34.45 square miles (89.2 km^{2}), of which 34.42 square miles (89.1 km^{2}) (or 99.91%) is land and 0.03 square miles (0.078 km^{2}) (or 0.09%) is water.
