= Scipio Township, LaPorte County, Indiana =

Scipio Township
- Township
- Coordinates: 41°33′59″N 86°45′52″W
- Country: United States
- State: Indiana
- County: LaPorte

Government
  - Type: Indiana township

Area
  - Total: 32.32 sq mi (83.7 km^{2})
  - Land: 32.07 sq mi (83.1 km^{2})
  - Water: 0.25 sq mi (0.65 km^{2})
- Elevation: 797 ft (243 m)

Population (2020)
  - Total: 5,218
  - Density: 142.5/sq mi (55.0/km^{2})
- FIPS code: 18-68346
- GNIS feature ID: 453835

Scipio Township is one of twenty-one townships in LaPorte County, Indiana. As of the 2020 census, its population was 5,218 (up from 4,570 at 2010) and it contained 2,115 housing units.

== Camp Colfax ==
During the Civil War, Camp Colfax was located about two blocks north of the location of the marker. It was a plot of ground at the west edge of La Porte, (at this time, the City of La Porte's west boundary was L Street) beyond L Street and a small lake in existence then which became known as Camp Lake, and bounded on the north by Second Street.

The 9th Regiment organized and mustered into service at Indianapolis, 25 April 1861, for three months service. At the end of the three months service, the 9th returned and went into rendezvous at Camp Colfax, under the command of Col. Robert H. Milroy. (Abstracted from information in files of La Porte County Historical Society, Inc., La Porte, IN)

The camp was named in honor of Schuyler Colfax, U. S. Representative 1855–1869 and Vice President 1869–1873.

== Geography ==
According to the 2010 census, the township has a total area of 32.32 square miles (83.7 km^{2}), of which 32.07 square miles (83.1 km^{2}) (or 99.23%) is land and 0.25 square miles (0.65 km^{2}) (or 0.77%) is water.

Door Village is located in Scipio Township.
