= Union Township, LaPorte County, Indiana =

Union Township
- Township
- Coordinates: 41°27′56″N 86°38′34″W
- Country: United States
- State: Indiana
- County: LaPorte

Government
  - Type: Indiana township

Area
  - Total: 27.86 sq mi (72.2 km^{2})
  - Land: 27.81 sq mi (72.0 km^{2})
  - Water: 0.04 sq mi (0.10 km^{2})
- Elevation: 692 ft (211 m)

Population (2020)
  - Total: 2,281
  - Density: 84.4/sq mi (32.6/km^{2})
- FIPS code: 18-77408
- GNIS feature ID: 453922

Union Township is one of twenty-one townships in LaPorte County, Indiana. As of the 2020 census, its population was 2,281 (down from 2,348 at 2010) and it contained 961 housing units.

== Geography ==
According to the 2010 census, the township has a total area of 27.86 square miles (72.2 km^{2}), of which 27.81 square miles (72.0 km^{2}) (or 99.82%) is land and 0.04 square miles (0.10 km^{2}) (or 0.14%) is water.
