= Pleasant Township, LaPorte County, Indiana =

Pleasant Township
- Township
- Coordinates: 41°34′53″N 86°38′35″W
- Country: United States
- State: Indiana
- County: LaPorte

Government
  - Type: Indiana township

Area
  - Total: 24.75 sq mi (64.1 km^{2})
  - Land: 24.69 sq mi (63.9 km^{2})
  - Water: 0.05 sq mi (0.13 km^{2})
- Elevation: 768 ft (234 m)

Population (2020)
  - Total: 3,502
  - Density: 136.9/sq mi (52.9/km^{2})
- FIPS code: 18-60408
- GNIS feature ID: 453747

Pleasant Township is one of twenty-one townships in LaPorte County, Indiana. As of the 2020 census, its population was 3,502 (up from 3,380 at 2010) and it contained 1,446 housing units.

== History ==
Pleasant Township was established in 1834, and named from its scenic landscapes.

== Geography ==
According to the 2010 census, the township has a total area of 24.75 square miles (64.1 km^{2}), of which 24.69 square miles (63.9 km^{2}) (or 99.76%) is land and 0.05 square miles (0.13 km^{2}) (or 0.20%) is water.
