= Cass Township, LaPorte County, Indiana =

Cass Township
- Township
- Coordinates: 41°23′11″N 86°52′05″W
- Country: United States
- State: Indiana
- County: LaPorte

Government
  - Type: Indiana township

Area
  - Total: 36.38 sq mi (94.2 km^{2})
  - Land: 36.38 sq mi (94.2 km^{2})
  - Water: 0 sq mi (0 km^{2})
- Elevation: 705 ft (215 m)

Population (2020)
  - Total: 1,825
  - Density: 50.4/sq mi (19.5/km^{2})
- FIPS code: 18-10720
- GNIS feature ID: 453165

Cass Township is one of twenty-one townships in LaPorte County, Indiana. As of the 2020 census, its population was 1,825 (a tiny decrease of 1,833 from 2010) and it contained 764 housing units.

== History ==
Cass Township was established in 1848. It was named for Lewis Cass, Democratic candidate in the 1848 United States presidential election.

== Geography ==
According to the 2010 census, the township has a total area of 36.38 square miles (94.2 km^{2}), all land.
