= Dewey Township, LaPorte County, Indiana =

Dewey Township
- Township
- Coordinates: 41°18′02″N 86°52′55″W
- Country: United States
- State: Indiana
- County: LaPorte

Government
  - Type: Indiana township

Area
  - Total: 35.83 sq mi (92.8 km^{2})
  - Land: 35.83 sq mi (92.8 km^{2})
  - Water: 0 sq mi (0 km^{2})
- Elevation: 666 ft (203 m)

Population (2020)
  - Total: 1,000
  - Density: 26.1/sq mi (10.1/km^{2})
- FIPS code: 18-17974
- GNIS feature ID: 453264

Dewey Township is one of twenty-one townships in LaPorte County, Indiana, USA. At the 2020 census, its population was 1,000 (up from 935 at 2010) and it contained 421 housing units.

Dewey Township was established in 1860.

== Geography ==
According to the 2010 census, the township has a total area of 35.83 square miles (92.8 km^{2}), all land.
