= LaPorte County, Indiana =

County in Indiana, United States

LaPorte County
- County
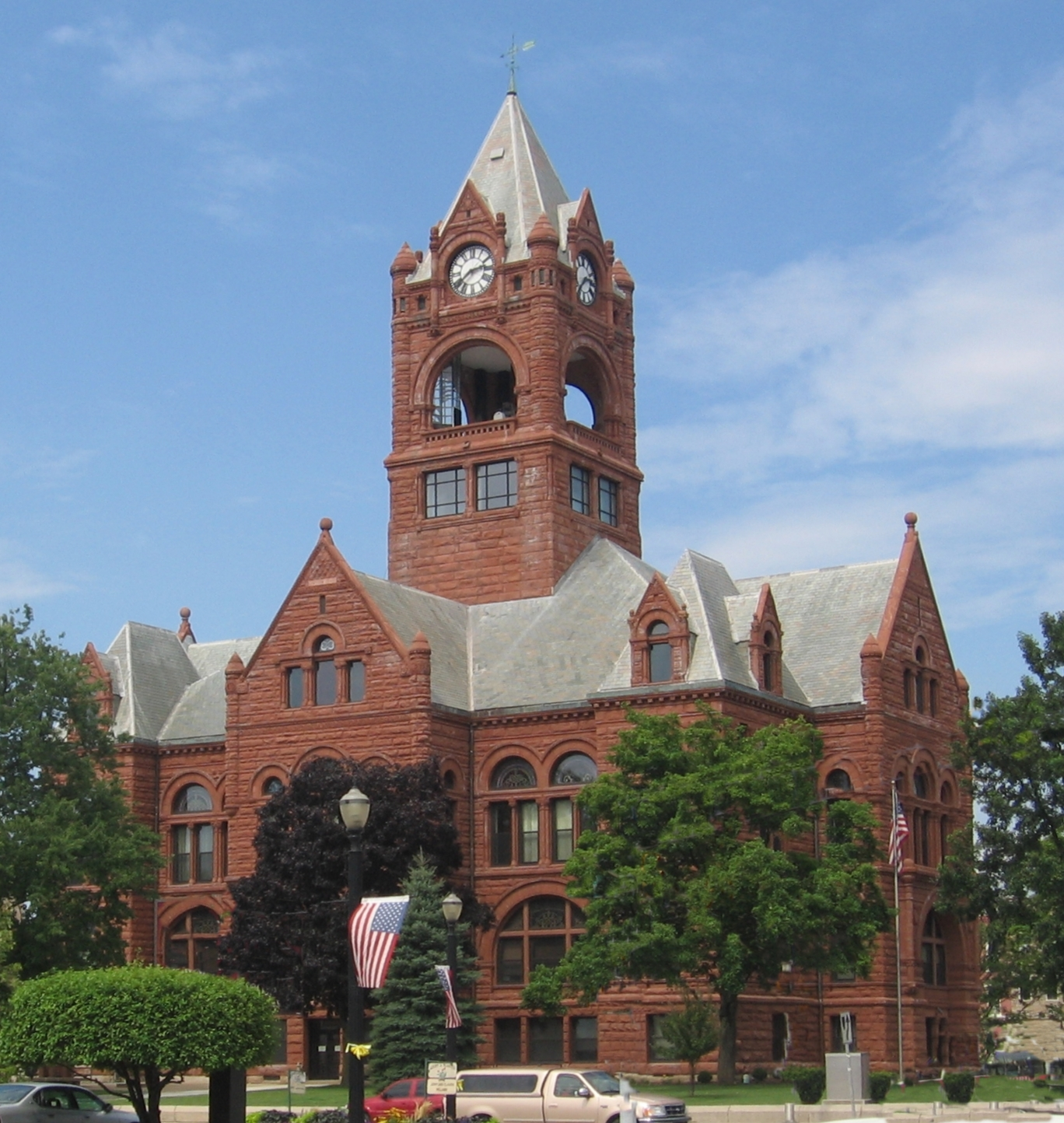
- LaPorte County Courthouse in La Porte, Indiana

- Seal

- Location in the state of Indiana

- Indiana's location in the U.S.
- Coordinates: 41°36′N 86°43′W
- Country: United States
- State: Indiana
- Regions: Northwest Indiana and Michiana
- Metro area: Chicago Metropolitan
- Established: April 1, 1832
- Named for: French for "the door"
- County seat: La Porte
- Largest city: Michigan City (population and total area)
- Incorporated municipalities: 11 cities and towns: Kingsbury (town); Kingsford Heights (town); La Porte (city); LaCrosse (town); Long Beach (town); Michiana Shores (town); Michigan City (city); Pottawattamie Park (town); Trail Creek (town); Wanatah (town); Westville (town)

Government
  - Type: County
  - Body: Board of Commissioners
  - Commissioner: Connie Gramarossa (R, 1st)
  - Commissioner: Steve Holifield (R, 2nd)
  - Commissioner: Joe Haney (R, 3rd)
  - County Council: Members: Justin Kiel(R); Randy Novak (D); Mark Yagelski (D); Jimmy Pressel III (R); Brett Kessler (R); Mike Mollenhauer (D); Adam Koronka (R)

Area
  - County: 613.26 sq mi (1,588.3 km^{2})
  - Land: 598.30 sq mi (1,549.6 km^{2})
  - Water: 14.96 sq mi (38.7 km^{2})
  - Metro: 10,874 sq mi (28,160 km^{2})
  - Rank: 2nd largest county in Indiana
  - Region: 2,726 sq mi (7,060 km^{2})
- Elevation (mean): 778 ft (237 m)
- Highest elevation – SW Galena Twp: 957 ft (292 m)
- Lowest elevation – at Lake Michigan: 581 ft (177 m)

Population (2020)
  - County: 112,417
  - Estimate (2025): 111,294 ▼
  - Rank: 16th largest county in Indiana
  - Density: 187.89/sq mi (72.546/km^{2})
  - Metro: 9,618,502
  - Region: 819,537
- Time zone: UTC−6 (Central)
  - Summer (DST): UTC−5 (Central)
- ZIP Codes: 46340, 46345-46, 46348, 46350, 46352, 46360-61, 46365, 46371, 46382, 46390-91, 46532, 46552, 46554, 46574
- Area code: 219
- Congressional districts: 1st and 2nd
- Indiana Senate districts: 5th and 8th
- Indiana House of Representatives districts: 7th, 9th, 17th and 20th
- FIPS code: 18-091
- GNIS feature ID: 0450507
- Interstates: link = Interstate 80 in Indiana link = Indiana Toll Road link = Interstate 90 in Indiana link = Interstate 94 in Indiana
- U.S. Routes: link = U.S. Route 6 in Indiana link = U.S. Route 12 in Indiana link = U.S. Route 20 in Indiana link = U.S. Route 30 in Indiana link = U.S. Route 35 in Indiana
- Airports: La Porte Municipal; Michigan City Municipal
- Waterways: East Arm Little Calumet River; Kankakee River; Lake Michigan; Little Calumet River; Trail Creek
- Amtrak station: Michigan City (closed)
- South Shore Line stations: 11th Street – Carroll Avenue Hudson Lake
- Public transit: Michigan City Transit
- Website: laporteco.in.gov
- Indiana county number 46

LaPorte County is a county located in the U.S. state of Indiana. As of 2020, the population was 112,417. The county seat is the city of La Porte, and the largest city is Michigan City. This county is part of the Northwest Indiana and Michiana regions of the Chicago metropolitan area. The LaPorte County Courthouse is located in the county seat of La Porte and is listed on the National Register of Historic Places.

== History ==
LaPorte County was formed in 1832. La porte means "the door" or "the port" in French. French travelers or explorers so named the area after discovering a natural opening in the dense forests that used to exist in this region, providing a gateway to lands further west.

From 1832 to 1835, LaPorte County had its boundaries and jurisdiction of the land west of it, going all the way to the east border of Chicago in Cook County, Illinois (land which is now Porter and Lake counties).

Before European-American settlement, all of the land that forms modern-day LaPorte County, and adjacent Starke County to the south belonged to the Potawatomi Indian nation. These Indians were forcibly removed to Kansas by the United States government in 1838, and many died on what survivors called the Trail of Death.

LaPorte County's initial European-American settlers were Yankee migrants, that is to say they were from New England or were from upstate New York and had parents who were from New England, and were descended from the English Puritans who settled New England in the colonial era. They were part of a wave of New England settlers moving west into what was then the Northwest Territory after the completion of the Erie Canal through the Mohawk Valley of New York State.

These first settlers in LaPorte County specifically hailed from the Massachusetts towns of Granville, Boston, Bridgewater, West Bridgewater, Andover, Nantucket Island, and Hampshire County; the Connecticut towns of Colchester, Wethersfield, Granby, and New Haven; the New Hampshire towns of Bradford, Amherst and Goffstown; the Vermont villages of Dorset, Albany and Fairfax; many also came from Orange County, Vermont, Caledonia County, Vermont and Penobscot County, Maine. They were mainly members of the Congregational Church. As result of the Second Great Awakening, many became Baptists and many also converted to Pentecostalism and Methodism. When they arrived in what is now LaPorte County, there was nothing but virgin forest and prairie. The New England settlers cleared roads and brush, developed farms, constructed churches, erected government buildings, and established post routes. As a result of this migration, La Porte County was partially culturally continuous with early New England culture for many years.

But by 1850, the three Eastern states that had contributed the most residents to LaPorte County were New York, Pennsylvania and Virginia, surpassing those migrants from New England. LaPorte County had the largest number of Southerners north of the Wabash Valley.

During the Civil War, the Louisville Journal noted that the 29th Indiana Regiment (mustered out of LaPorte) "may almost be regarded as a Kentucky regiment for a large majority of its members are either natives or descendants of native Kentuckians". Three Union Camps reigned in LaPorte County helping the Union to Civil War victory.

When the county was initially proposed and organized, its boundaries did not extend as far south or east as they do today. A section of land north of the Kankakee River originally belonged to Starke County. However, residents living in that area had difficulty crossing the Grand Kankakee Marsh that surrounded the river in order to reach the rest of the county. It was necessary to travel some distance east to Lemon's bridge, before making the journey south. Effectively isolated from the rest of Starke County, these residents asked that their land be annexed to LaPorte County, which was completed on January 28, 1842. Thereafter, the Kankakee River formed the southern boundary of the county. Finally, on January 10, 1850, some twenty sections of land were annexed from St. Joseph County to the east, giving LaPorte County the boundaries that essentially exist to this day.

Whether the correct spelling of the city and county is "La Porte" or "LaPorte" is disputed, although state law refers to "LaPorte County."

LaPorte County is noted for being the last-known place of the Belle Gunness serial murders. Bodies of her victims were discovered after her house burned and she disappeared in 1908. Gunness lived on a farm on the outskirts of the county seat.

== Geography ==
According to the 2010 census, the county has a total area of 613.26 square miles (1,588.3 km^{2}), of which 598.30 square miles (1,549.6 km^{2}) (or 97.56%) is land and 14.96 square miles (38.7 km^{2}) (or 2.44%) is water. The highest point, at 957 feet (292 m), is in southwestern Galena Township near County Roads East 600 North and North 150 East. The lowest point, at 581 feet (177 m), is along the Lake Michigan shoreline.

=== Adjacent counties ===
- Berrien County, Michigan (north/Eastern Time Zone border)
- St. Joseph County (east/Eastern Time Zone border)
- Starke County (south)
- Jasper County (southwest)
- Porter County (west)
- Cook County, Illinois (northwest) - boundary in Lake Michigan

=== National protected area ===
- Indiana Dunes National Park – also in Lake and Porter counties

=== Major highways ===
- I-80 / I-90 / Indiana Toll Road
- I-94
- U.S. Route 6
- U.S. Route 12
- U.S. Route 20
- U.S. Route 30
- U.S. Route 35
- U.S. Route 421
- State Road 2
- State Road 4
- State Road 8
- State Road 39
- State Road 104
- State Road 212

=== Railroads ===
- Canadian National Railway
- Chesapeake and Indiana Railroad
- Chicago, Fort Wayne and Eastern Railroad
- Chicago South Shore and South Bend Railroad
- CSX Transportation
- Norfolk Southern Railway
- South Shore Line (commuter rail)

== Municipalities ==
The municipalities in LaPorte County and their populations as of the 2010 Census:

=== Cities ===
- La Porte – 22,471
- Michigan City – 32,075

=== Towns ===
- Kingsbury – 242
- Kingsford Heights – 1,435
- LaCrosse – 551
- Long Beach – 1,179
- Michiana Shores – 313
- Pottawattamie Park – 235
- Trail Creek – 2,052
- Wanatah – 1,048
- Westville – 5,853

=== Census-designated places ===
- Fish Lake – 1,016
- Hanna – 463
- Hudson Lake – 1,297
- Rolling Prairie – 582

=== Unincorporated communities ===
- Alida
- Byron
- Door Village
- Duneland Beach
- Hesston
- Holmesville
- Lake Park
- Mill Creek
- Otis
- Pinhook
- Pinola
- Plainfield
- Riverside
- Salem Heights
- Smith
- South Center
- South Wanatah
- Springfield
- Springville
- Stillwell
- Thomaston
- Tracy
- Union Mills
- Waterford
- Wellsboro
- Wilders

== Townships ==
LaPorte County contains 21 townships, more than any other county in the state. The townships, with their populations as of the 2010 Census, are:

- Cass – 1,833
- Center – 25,075
- Clinton – 1,507
- Coolspring – 14,718
- Dewey – 935
- Galena – 1,899
- Hanna – 965
- Hudson – 1,883
- Johnson – 198
- Kankakee – 4,830
- Lincoln – 1,794
- Michigan – 27,522
- New Durham – 8,664
- Noble – 1,625
- Pleasant – 3,380
- Prairie – 209
- Scipio – 4,570
- Springfield – 4,045
- Union – 2,348
- Washington – 1,357
- Wills – 2,110

=== Unincorporated towns ===
- Lakeland

== Demographics ==
Historical population
Census	Pop.	Note	%±
1840	8,184		—
1850	12,145		48.4%
1860	22,919		88.7%
1870	27,062		18.1%
1880	30,985		14.5%
1890	34,445		11.2%
1900	38,386		11.4%
1910	45,797		19.3%
1920	50,443		10.1%
1930	60,490		19.9%
1940	63,660		5.2%
1950	76,808		20.7%
1960	95,111		23.8%
1970	105,342		10.8%
1980	108,632		3.1%
1990	107,066		−1.4%
2000	110,106		2.8%
2010	111,467		1.2%
2020	112,417		0.9%
2025 (est.)	111,294	▼	−1.0%
U.S. Decennial Census; 1790-1960 1900-1990; 1990-2000 2010

=== Racial and ethnic composition ===
LaPorte County, Indiana – racial and ethnic composition Note: the US Census treats Hispanic/Latino as an ethnic category. This table excludes Latinos from the racial categories and assigns them to a separate category. Hispanics/Latinos may be of any race.
Race / ethnicity (NH = Non-Hispanic)	Pop 1980	Pop 1990	Pop 2000	Pop 2010	Pop 2020	% 1980	% 1990	% 2000	% 2010	% 2020
White alone (NH)	98,184	95,229	93,330	90,695	85,957	90.38%	88.94%	84.76%	81.36%	76.46%
Black or African American alone (NH)	8,599	9,522	11,052	11,835	11,874	7.92%	8.89%	10.04%	10.62%	10.56%
Native American or Alaska Native alone (NH)	195	247	306	246	250	0.18%	0.23%	0.28%	0.22%	0.22%
Asian alone (NH)	366	422	483	570	743	0.34%	0.39%	0.44%	0.51%	0.66%
Native Hawaiian or Pacific Islander alone (NH)	x	x	16	13	18	x	x	0.01%	0.01%	0.02%
Other race alone (NH)	97	70	126	97	467	0.09%	0.07%	0.11%	0.09%	0.42%
Mixed-race or multiracial (NH)	x	x	1,391	1,918	5,123	x	x	1.26%	1.72%	4.56%
Hispanic or Latino (any race)	1,191	1,576	3,402	6,093	7,985	1.10%	1.47%	3.09%	5.47%	7.10%
Total	108,632	107,066	110,106	111,467	112,417	100.00%	100.00%	100.00%	100.00%	100.00%

=== 2020 census ===
As of the 2020 census, the county had a population of 112,417. The median age was 41.4 years. 21.3% of residents were under the age of 18 and 18.6% of residents were 65 years of age or older. For every 100 females there were 106.4 males, and for every 100 females age 18 and over there were 107.5 males age 18 and over.

The racial makeup of the county was 78.4% White, 10.8% Black or African American, 0.4% American Indian and Alaska Native, 0.7% Asian, <0.1% Native Hawaiian and Pacific Islander, 3.0% from some other race, and 6.8% from two or more races. Hispanic or Latino residents of any race comprised 7.1% of the population.

63.5% of residents lived in urban areas, while 36.5% lived in rural areas.

There were 43,799 households in the county, of which 28.0% had children under the age of 18 living in them. Of all households, 44.6% were married-couple households, 19.7% were households with a male householder and no spouse or partner present, and 27.5% were households with a female householder and no spouse or partner present. About 29.4% of all households were made up of individuals and 13.0% had someone living alone who was 65 years of age or older.

There were 49,780 housing units, of which 12.0% were vacant. Among occupied housing units, 71.4% were owner-occupied and 28.6% were renter-occupied. The homeowner vacancy rate was 1.4% and the rental vacancy rate was 8.0%.

=== 2010 census ===
As of the 2010 United States census, there were 111,467 people, 42,331 households, and 28,228 families residing in the county. The population density was 186.3 inhabitants per square mile (71.9/km^{2}). There were 48,448 housing units at an average density of 81.0 per square mile (31.3/km^{2}). The racial makeup of the county was 84.1% white, 10.8% black or African American, 0.5% Asian, 0.3% American Indian, 2.0% from other races, and 2.3% from two or more races. Those of Hispanic or Latino origin made up 5.5% of the population. In terms of ancestry, 30.7% were German, 15.3% were Irish, 11.5% were Polish, 8.3% were English, and 5.9% were American.

Of the 42,331 households, 31.0% had children under the age of 18 living with them, 48.3% were married couples living together, 12.8% had a female householder with no husband present, 33.3% were non-families, and 27.3% of all households were made up of individuals. The average household size was 2.48 and the average family size was 3.00. The median age was 39.6 years.

The median income for a household in the county was $47,697 and the median income for a family was $56,679. Males had a median income of $45,537 versus $30,774 for females. The per capita income for the county was $22,599. About 9.9% of families and 13.8% of the population were below the poverty line, including 22.7% of those under age 18 and 7.1% of those age 65 or over.

== Education ==
=== K-12 schools ===
School districts include:

- John Glenn School Corporation
- La Porte Community School Corporation
- Michigan City Area Schools
- New Durham Township Metropolitan School District
- New Prairie United School Corporation
- South Central Community School Corporation
- Tri-Township Consolidated School Corporation

=== Colleges and universities ===
- Ivy Tech Community College
- Purdue University Northwest

=== Public libraries ===
The county is served by five different public library systems:

- LaCrosse Public Library
- LaPorte County Public Library has its main location in La Porte as well as the Coolspring, Fish Lake, Hanna, Kingsford Heights, Rolling Prairie and Union Mills branches.
- Michigan City Public Library
- Wanatah Public Library
- Westville-New Durham Township Public Library has its main location in Westville.

=== Hospitals ===
- Northwest Health - La Porte – 84 beds
- Franciscan Health Michigan City, Michigan City – 310 beds

== Climate and weather ==
La Porte, Indiana

Climate chart (precipitation, max. and min. temperature)
J	F	M	A	M	J	J	A	S	O	N	D
1.8 30 12	1.7 36 16	3 47 27	4.1 60 37	4.3 71 47	4.8 80 58	3.9 84 62	3.9 81 60	3.3 75 51	3 63 39	3.6 48 30	2.7 35 19
- █ Average max. and min. temperatures in °F
- █ Precipitation totals in inches
- Source: The Weather Channel
Metric conversion
J	F	M	A	M	J	J	A	S	O	N	D
47 −1 −11	43 2 −9	75 8 −3	104 16 3	110 22 8	122 27 14	98 29 17	98 27 16	85 24 11	76 17 4	91 9 −1	69 2 −7
- █ Average max. and min. temperatures in °C
- █ Precipitation totals in mm

In recent years, average temperatures in La Porte have ranged from a low of 12 °F (−11 °C) in January to a high of 84 °F (29 °C) in July, although a record low of −28 °F (−33 °C) was recorded in January 1977 and a record high of 104 °F (40 °C) was recorded in June 1988. Average monthly precipitation ranged from 1.68 inches (43 mm) in February to 4.79 inches (122 mm) in June.

== Politics ==
From 1992 to 2012, LaPorte County was reliably Democratic, although John Kerry came within 198 votes of losing the county in 2004. In recent years, it has been increasingly Republican, with Donald Trump winning the county in all three of his presidential runs.

United States presidential election results for LaPorte County, Indiana
Year	Republican		Democratic		Third party(ies)	
Year	No.	%	No.	%	No.	%
1888	3,722	44.11%	4,607	54.60%	109	1.29%
1892	3,548	41.95%	4,703	55.61%	206	2.44%
1896	4,691	50.28%	4,511	48.35%	127	1.36%
1900	4,809	49.52%	4,783	49.25%	119	1.23%
1904	5,952	55.68%	4,472	41.84%	265	2.48%
1908	5,824	49.52%	5,680	48.30%	256	2.18%
1912	2,701	24.87%	4,847	44.62%	3,314	30.51%
1916	5,726	50.29%	5,276	46.33%	385	3.38%
1920	11,204	65.00%	5,459	31.67%	575	3.34%
1924	11,597	61.22%	5,214	27.52%	2,132	11.25%
1928	14,763	61.32%	9,254	38.44%	58	0.24%
1932	10,739	41.31%	14,890	57.28%	366	1.41%
1936	11,722	42.79%	15,359	56.07%	311	1.14%
1940	15,771	53.29%	13,732	46.40%	90	0.30%
1944	16,543	54.12%	13,896	45.46%	129	0.42%
1948	15,661	52.45%	13,923	46.63%	275	0.92%
1952	22,576	59.83%	15,011	39.78%	146	0.39%
1956	24,622	62.90%	14,417	36.83%	103	0.26%
1960	22,738	52.71%	20,317	47.10%	85	0.20%
1964	16,270	42.16%	22,220	57.57%	104	0.27%
1968	20,295	49.76%	15,780	38.69%	4,708	11.54%
1972	26,243	65.98%	13,222	33.24%	311	0.78%
1976	21,989	54.09%	18,217	44.81%	449	1.10%
1980	22,424	55.32%	15,387	37.96%	2,727	6.73%
1984	23,346	59.00%	15,904	40.20%	317	0.80%
1988	20,537	53.64%	17,585	45.93%	163	0.43%
1992	14,962	35.24%	17,717	41.72%	9,784	23.04%
1996	14,106	35.82%	19,879	50.48%	5,392	13.69%
2000	18,994	47.79%	19,736	49.65%	1,017	2.56%
2004	20,916	49.09%	21,114	49.56%	576	1.35%
2008	17,918	38.11%	28,258	60.10%	842	1.79%
2012	18,615	42.62%	24,107	55.19%	959	2.20%
2016	22,687	49.74%	19,798	43.41%	3,124	6.85%
2020	25,997	52.54%	22,427	45.32%	1,059	2.14%
2024	26,726	56.09%	20,007	41.99%	914	1.92%

LaPorte County is split between Indiana's 1st and Indiana's 2nd congressional district and is represented by Rudy Yakym and Frank Mrvan in the United States Congress. It is also part of Indiana Senate districts 5 and 8 and Indiana House of Representatives districts 7, 9, 17 and 20.

County elected officials:

=== Board of Commissioners ===
- Steve Holifield (R, 2nd)
- Connie Gramarossa (R, 1st)
- Joe Haney (R, 3rd)

=== County Council ===
- Adam Koronka (R)
- Justin Kiel(R)
- Jimmy Pressel III (R)
- Jennifer Heath (D)
- Brett Kessler (R)
- Mike Mollenhauer (D)
- Mark Yagelski (D)

Elected officials:

- Assessor: Michael R. Schultz (D)
- Auditor: Michael Rosenbaum (R)
- Clerk: Heather Stevens (R)
- Coroner: Lynn Swanson (R)
- Prosecutor: Sean Fagen (R)
- Recorder: Elzbieta Bilderback (R)
- Sheriff: Ronald C. Heeg (R)
- Surveyor: John Matwyshyn (R)
- Treasurer: Dan Barenie (R)

== See also ==
- National Register of Historic Places listings in LaPorte County, Indiana
