= List of Indiana fish and wildlife areas =

The following is a list of fish and wildlife areas in the state of Indiana.

Name	County
Atterbury FWA	Johnson
Blue Grass FWA	Warrick
Brush Creek FWA	Jennings
Busseron Creek FWA	Sullivan
Chinook FWA	Clay
Crosley FWA	Jennings
Deer Creek FWA	Putnam
Fairbanks Landing FWA	Sullivan
Glendale FWA	Daviess
Goose Pond FWA	Daviess
Hillenbrand FWA	Greene
Hovey Lake FWA	Posey
Jasper-Pulaski FWA	Pulaski and Jasper
Kankakee FWA	Starke
Kingsbury FWA	LaPorte
LaSalle FWA	Lake and Newton
Pigeon River FWA	Stueben
Pisgah Marsh/Durham Lake FWA	Kosciusko
J.E. Roush FWA	Warrick
Splinter Ridge FWA	Jennings
Sugar Ridge FWA	Jennings
Tri-County FWA	Kosciusko
Wabashiki FWA	Vigo
Wilbur Wright FWA	Henry
Willow Slough FWA	Newton
Winamac FWA	Pulaski

== See also ==
- Indiana Department of Natural Resources
- List of Indiana state parks
- List of Indiana state lakes
- List of Indiana state forests
