= Kankakee River =

River in Indiana and Illinois, United States

Kankakee River Theakiki, Aukiki
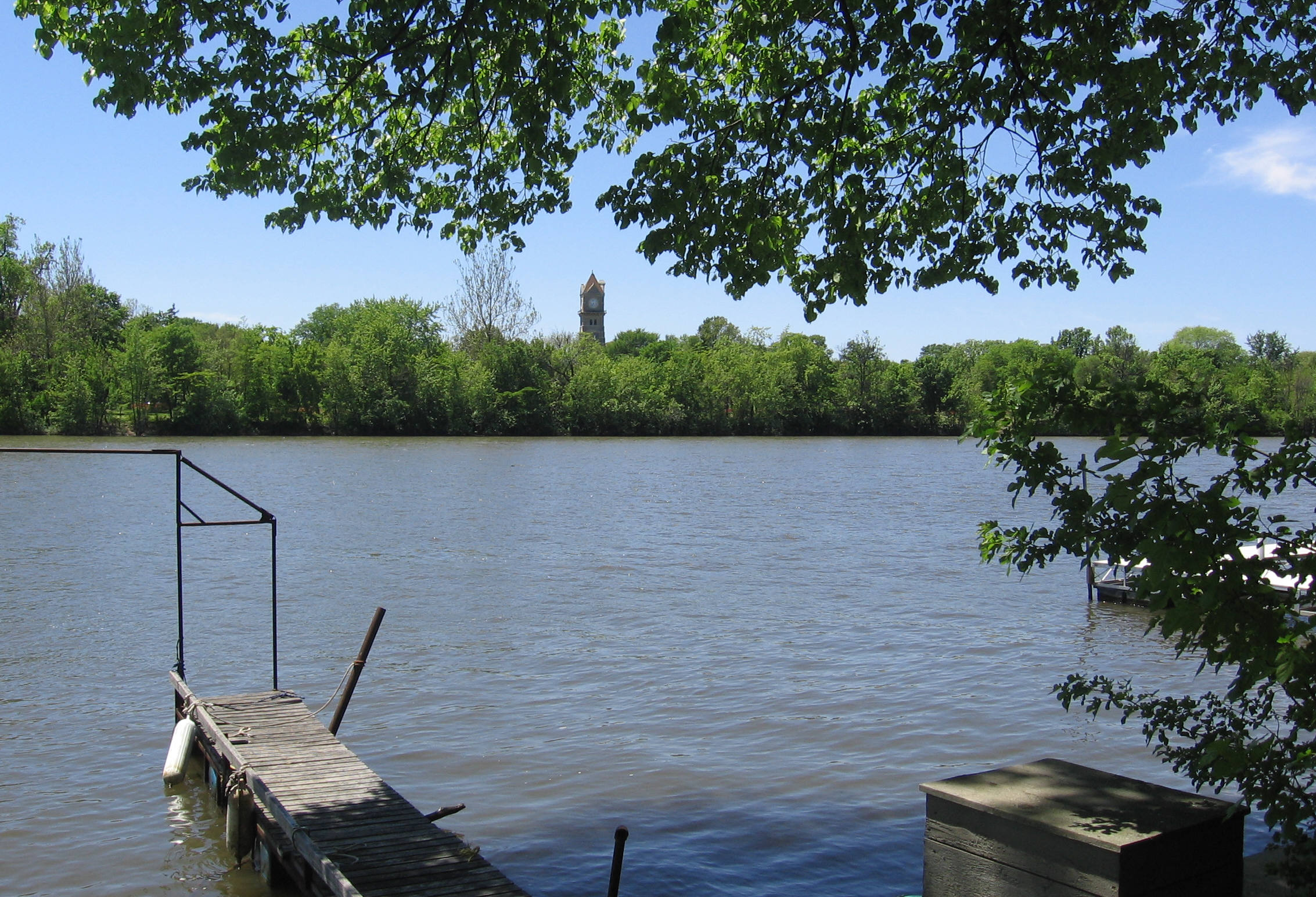
- View of the river from Kankakee, Illinois, near Cobb Park

Location
- Country: United States
- State: Indiana, Illinois
- Region: Upper Illinois River Valley, Upper Mississippi Basin
- Cities: South Bend, Indiana, Kankakee, Illinois

Physical characteristics
- Source: St. Joseph County, Indiana
  - location: Portage Township, St. Joseph County, Indiana
  - coordinates: 41°39′14.864″N 86°18′19.0404″W
  - elevation: 725 ft (221 m)
- Mouth: Illinois River
  - location: Goose Lake Township, Illinois
  - coordinates: 41°23′25.4292″N 88°15′37.1478″W
  - elevation: 508 ft (155 m)
- Length: 133 mi (214 km)
- Basin size: 5,150 mi^{2} (13,300 km^{2})
- Discharge
  - location: Wilmington, Will County, Illinois
  - average: 4,823 cu ft/s (136.6 m^{3}/s)
  - minimum: 204 cu ft/s (5.8 m^{3}/s)
  - maximum: 75,900 cu ft/s (2,150 m^{3}/s)

Basin features
- Progression: Kankakee River → Illinois → Mississippi → Gulf of Mexico
- Tributaries
  - left: Yellow River, Iroquois River
  - right: Little Kankakee River, Crooked Creek (Indiana)

The Kankakee River is a tributary of the Illinois River, approximately 133 miles (214 km) long, in the Central Corn Belt Plains of northwestern Indiana and northeastern Illinois in the United States. At one time, the river drained one of the largest wetlands in North America and furnished a significant portage between the Great Lakes and the Mississippi River. Significantly altered from its original channel, it flows through a primarily rural farming region of reclaimed cropland, south of Lake Michigan.

== Description ==
The Kankakee rises in northwestern Indiana, approximately five miles (8.0 km) southwest of South Bend, Indiana. It flows in a straight channelized course, generally southwestward through rural northwestern Indiana, collecting the Yellow River from the south in Starke County, and passing the communities of South Center and English Lake. It forms the border between LaPorte, Porter, and Lake counties on the north and Starke, Jasper, and Newton counties on the south. The river curves westward and ceases to be channelized as it enters Kankakee County in northeastern Illinois. Approximately three miles (4.8 km) southeast of the city of Kankakee, it receives the Iroquois River from the south and turns sharply to the northwest for its lower 35 miles (56 km). It joins the Des Plaines River from the south to form the Illinois River, approximately 50 miles (80 km) southwest of Chicago.

The Kankakee River Basin drains 2,989 square miles (7,740 km^{2}) in northwest Indiana, 2,169 square miles (5,620 km^{2}) in northeast Illinois, and about seven square miles (18 km^{2}) in southwest Lower Michigan. The Kankakee River heads near South Bend, then flows westward into Illinois, where it joins with the Des Plaines River to form the Illinois. The area of Lake County (Indiana) which originally drained to Lake Michigan but now drains by means of artificial diversion to the Illinois River is not considered to be part of the Kankakee River Basin study region. Although the Kankakee River basin includes portions of Indiana, Illinois, and Michigan, the discussion below will focus on the Indiana portion of the basin.

=== Kankakee Outwash and Lacustrine Plain ===
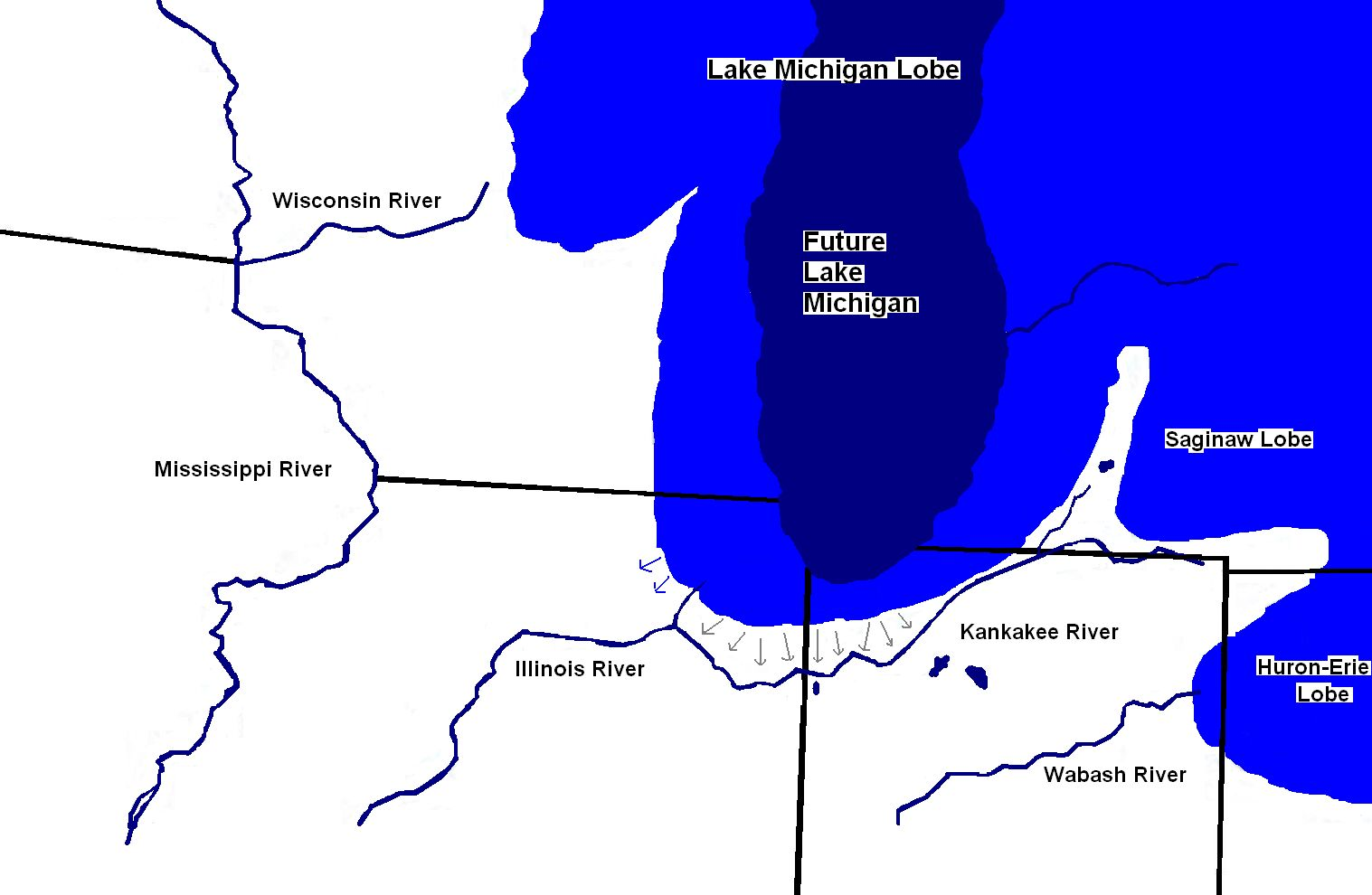
Michigan ice lobe at the Valparaiso Moraine location during the Pleistocene Ice Age

The Kankakee Outwash and Lacustrine Plain, a large and poorly drained plain, comprises approximately the southern quarter of both Lake and Porter counties. It is the most recent of the three landscape regions to face the pressures of impending urbanization. Large portions of the area were once marshland associated with the meandering Kankakee River, which, for eight or nine months of the year, was flanked on both sides by wetlands. The marsh area was three to four miles (4.8 to 6.4 km) wide and contained water one to four feet (0.30 to 1.22 m) deep. The low marshland was broken by infrequent islands of sand blown into dunes. The sand islands were the sites of Indian encampments and later of pioneer homes. The Kankakee marsh was an effective barrier to early southerly exploration of both counties, but the area has been progressively drained by ditches constructed during the past 60 years.

=== Landscape ===
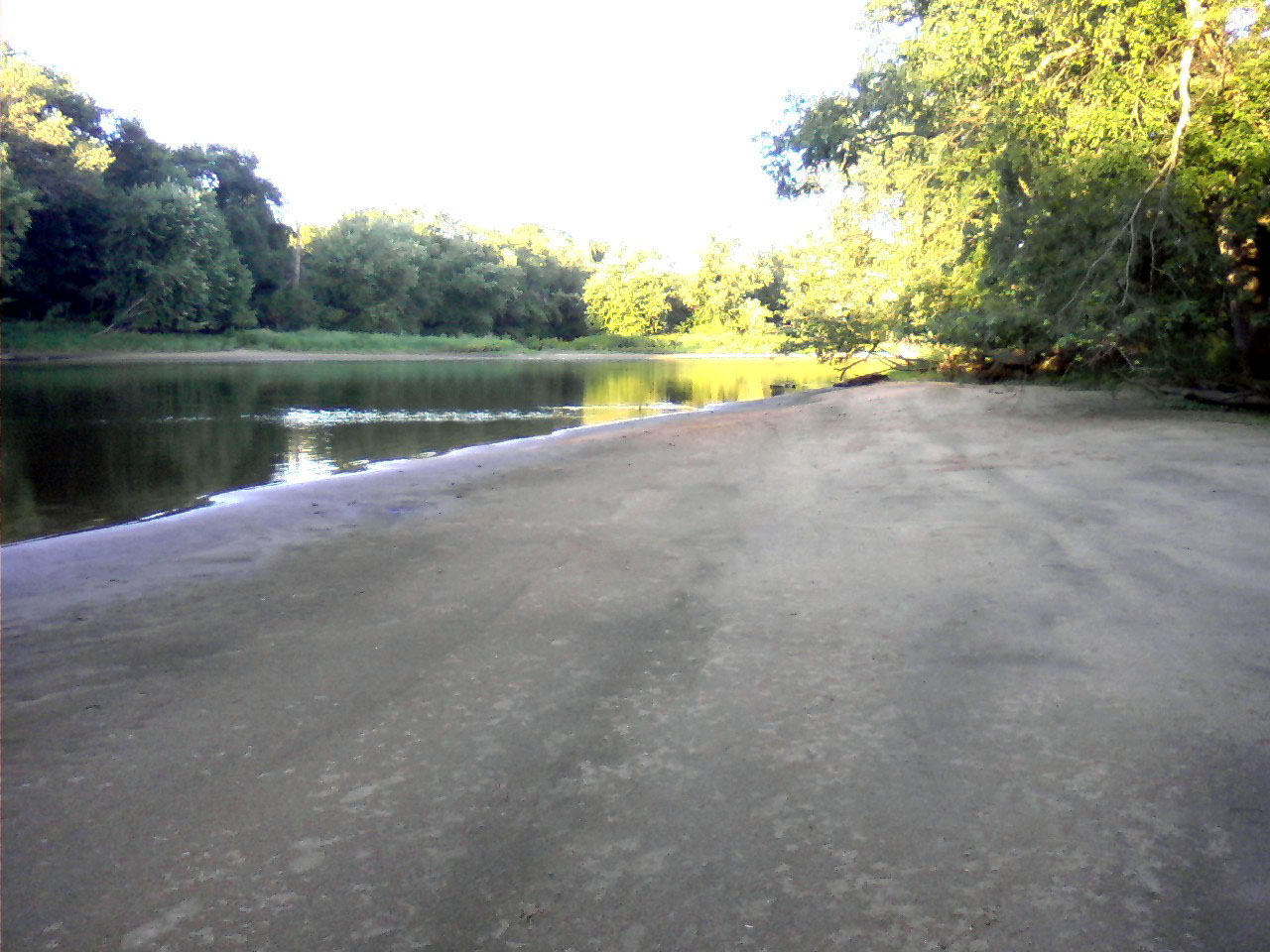
Sandy shore along Kankakee River, three miles (4.8 km) west of Illinois–Indiana state line

The Kankakee River Basin is a product of the Wisconsin Glacial Episode. It is a remnant of the glacial lakes that comprised the Lake Michigan lobe of the ice sheet. Landscape elements include 1) the nearly level plains of a ground moraine, 2) eolian (wind driven deposits) plains, 3) outwash deposits, 4) the central river basin and 5) end moraines forming the north, middle and southern borders. Local relief varies from 60 feet (18 m) along the Iroquois Moraine, up to 100 feet (30 m) on the Valparaiso Moraine. Deposits range from 50 to 100 feet (15 to 30 m) in the lower basin (western). The deepest deposits of 100 to 250 feet (30 to 76 m) are in the upper basin (eastern). Along the Valparaiso Moraine, deposits can reach 350 feet (110 m) thick.

Outwash deposits occur primarily along the northern border of the basin. The southern half of the Kankakee Basin, south of the main river channel, is characterized by the fine-grained sediments that are wind driven, forming a series of broad eolian sand dunes and ridges. These are of moderate height. lacustrine silts and clays are mixed with the various waterborne and wind driven deposits throughout the basin.

=== Bedrock ===
The bedrock underlying the Kankakee Basin is primarily of Silurian age. There are also strata from the Devonian, and Mississippian periods. The Silurian rocks are primarily dolomite and limestone. A major subterranean feature is the Kankakee Arch; it is an extension of the Cincinnati Arch. North of the arch, the strata dip towards Lake Michigan and the Michigan Basin. To the south, the strata dips southwest toward the Illinois Basin. Within the Kankakee Basin (Lake, Jasper, and Pulaski counties), the rock strata are nearly flat, being at the top of the arch.

=== Current conditions ===
The Advanced Hydrological Prediction Service contains current data for river depths.

Contrary to what may be shown in online mapping sites or GPS software, the bridge over the Kankakee River on State Line Road near the public ramp at the Indiana–Illinois state line is closed and partially dismantled. Some fishing maps and websites about the river may include road directions to the public ramp at the state line, with outdated information. The public ramp is located on the north side of the river, and with the bridge out, it is not accessible from the south side, from Illinois Route 114/Indiana State Road 10. As of September 7, 2008, the old iron bridge at the Indiana–Illinois state line often clears the water by only approximately 3 feet (0.9 m), making it possible to pass beneath only in small boats, canoes, etc.

== History ==
=== Kankakee Torrent ===
The Kankakee River was originally formed around 16,000 years ago by an event known as the Kankakee Torrent. A glacial lake resulting from meltwater from the Wisconsin glaciation breached the moraines (located in what is today northern Indiana) holding it in. The resultant flood created the bed of the Kankakee River and had even greater impact in what is today the state of Illinois.

=== Grand Kankakee Marsh ===
Up through the early 19th century, the river furnished an important water transportation route through the Illinois Country for both Native Americans and early European settlers, notably the French fur trappers. The headwaters of the river near present-day South Bend allowed a portage to the St. Joseph River, which drains into Lake Michigan, as well as furnishing a subsequent portage to the Lake Erie watershed. The Kankakee, thus, was part of an inland canoe route connecting the Great Lakes to the Illinois River and subsequently to the Mississippi River.

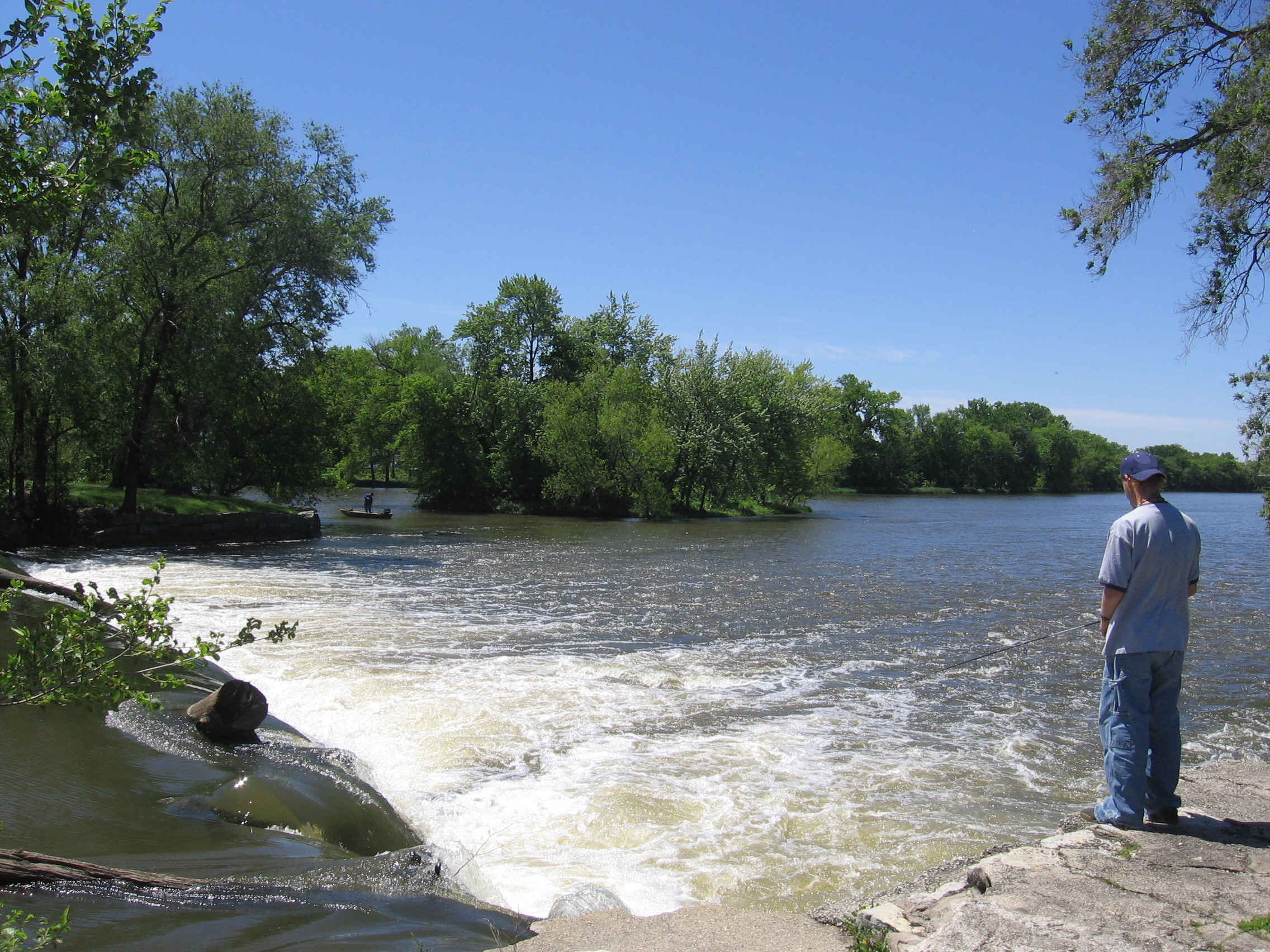
Fisherman beside dam on the Kankakee River at Momence, Illinois, on the north bank, looking southwest

Until the end of the 19th century, the river was nearly 240 miles (390 km) long, flowing in a highly meandering course through a vast complex of wetlands surrounding the river, that was known as the Grand Kankakee Marsh. Encompassing 5,300 square miles (14,000 km^{2}), it was one of the largest marsh wetlands in the United States.

=== LaPorte and Starke county line ===
Today, the Kankakee essentially forms the county line between LaPorte and Starke counties. However, when the two counties were originally proposed, Starke County's borders were such that the river divided the county and effectively isolated the north-west portion. In order to reach the rest of the county, it was necessary for residents in this area to travel some distance east to Lemon's bridge, before making the journey south. These residents petitioned the state to be annexed by LaPorte County, and this was done on January 28, 1842. The area of land relinquished by Starke County became the townships of Cass, Dewey, Hanna, and Prairie in LaPorte County.

=== Draining the riverine wetland ===
Beginning in the mid-19th century, much of the basin of wetlands was drained to create cultivated cropland. Two large ditches were constructed in 1858, as part of the Swamp Act of 1852, the first attempt to drain the marsh. A lobby grew among the large landholders in Lake County who advocated the complete drainage of the marsh, but due to the American Civil War and the subsequent economic downturn, little action occurred until the 1880s. In 1884, meetings were held by land owners in South Bend to discuss the drainage of the marsh. Two of the largest landholders agreed to build a network of drainage ditches in their lands to begin draining the eastern edge of the marsh. State funding was granted to the project during the term of Indiana Governor Claude Matthews and the project was expanded to include the entire marsh. At the time, it was heralded as a great advance for the state which was also in the process of draining the Great Black Swamp. By 1910, most of the marshlands were drained and work on rerouting the Kankakee River began. In 1917, the river was dredged to make it significantly deeper; by 1922, the process was mostly completed and the river was several miles shorter than its original course.

The upper river was also highly channelized with levees to allow easier transport of cut timber from the wetlands to saw mills downstream in Illinois. The channelization aided in the desiccation of the surrounding wetlands and reduced the river to less than half of its original length. Of the original marsh, only 30,000 acres (12,000 ha) remain, comprising approximately one percent of the original area. The channelization of the river has rendered it especially prone to flooding. Starting in the 1980s, federal and state efforts have attempted to restore part of the original floodplain of the river through strategic widening of the levees.

=== Today ===
The river remains a popular destination for recreational canoeing and fishing for warm-water species. Kankakee River State Park is located along the river, northwest of Kankakee, Illinois. The 4,095-acre (16.57 km^{2}) Kankakee Fish and Wildlife Area is located in Indiana.

== Route ==
=== St. Joseph County (South Bend) ===
The headwaters of the Kankakee River is southwest of downtown South Bend, Indiana, within the city limits. An area of wetlands and springs to the northwest of the South Bend Ethanol Plant is the start of the Kankakee River. An old Indian portage, about two miles (3.2 km) long, stretched from this area towards the northeast to what are today Highland and Riverview cemeteries, along what were once the banks of the St. Joseph River, but now forms a bank of Pinhook Park Lagoon. The St. Joseph River drains into Lake Michigan. The famous Council Oak Tree stood along this portage about 300 yards (270 m) from the St. Joseph River. Farms fields cover what was once a marshland.

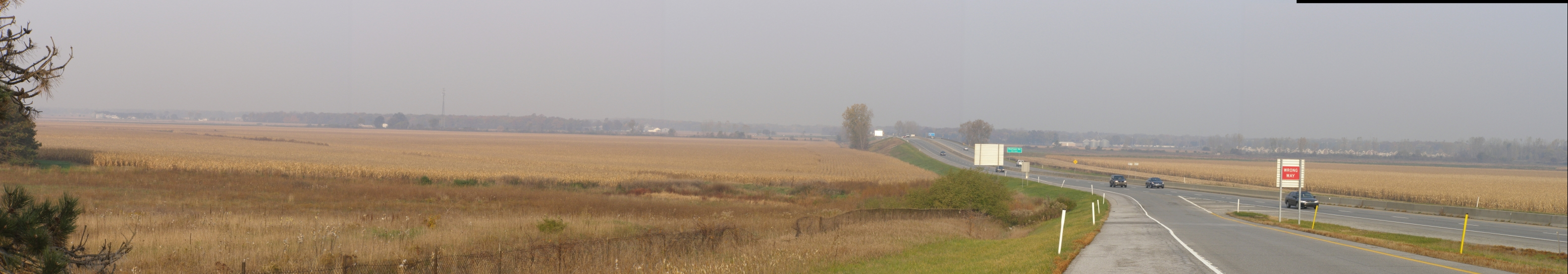
Headwaters of the Kankakee (US 20/US 31 at Prairie Avenue exit)
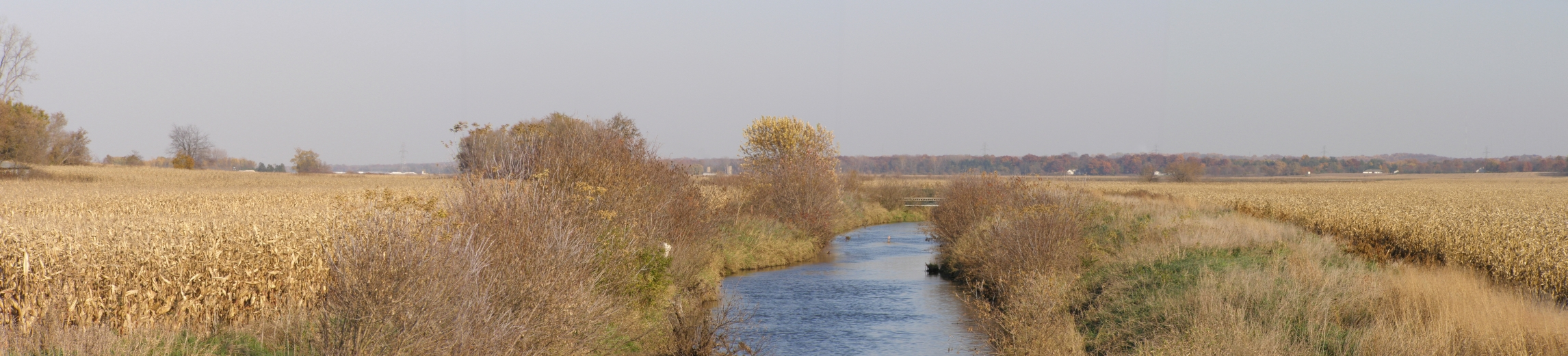
Headwaters of the Kankakee (Crumstown Road, south of Crumstown)

The river has been "ditched" and is called Dixon West Place Ditch. Below Crumstown, Geyer Ditch joins it from the north, flowing out of Berrien County in southern Michigan.

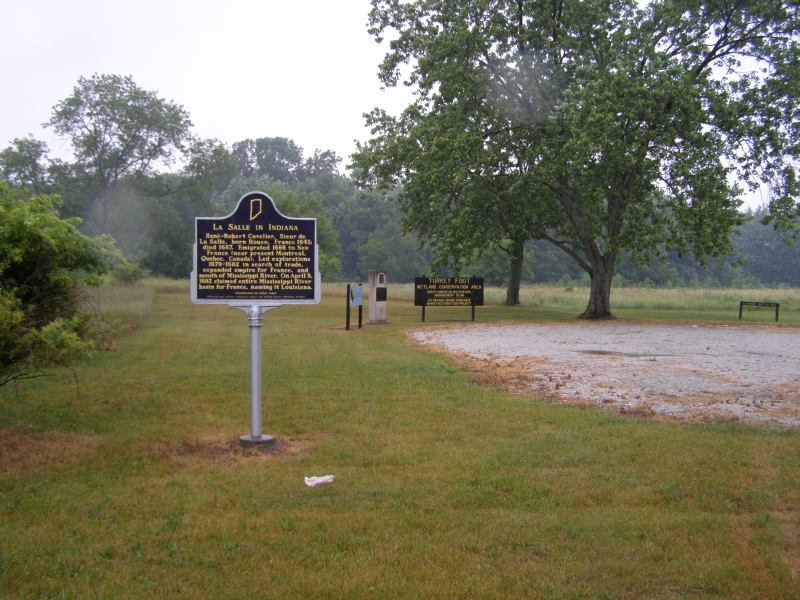
Turkey Foot Wetland Conservation Area (East Yellowstone Park Road, off US 30)

=== LaPorte and Starke counties ===
The Kankakee River passes through the southeast corner of Starke County. Here it takes on a more natural appearance with wetlands spreading out along both sides of the river. The river channels form the northern border between Starke County and LaPorte County to its north. These are some of the more extensive wetlands along the upper river. The Kankakee Fish and Wildlife Area is a state managed wildlife area, heavily managed to control water levels throughout the year. Here, the Yellow River, which is the second-largest branch of the Kankakee, joins the main river.

=== Porter County ===
The Kankakee River also forms the southern boundary of Porter County, delimiting an area of farm land and wetland forest. Throughout this area, the Kankakee is also called the Marble Power Ditch. This is the heart of the Grand Kankakee Marsh, which was drained in the early 20th century.

The earliest recorded crossing of the Kankakee was at Baum's Bridge, on South Baum's Bridge Road (Porter County) to CR 200 W (Jasper County). The other historic crossing between Porter County and Jasper County is Dunn's Bridge, further east; CR 500 E (Porter County) to CR 400 E (Jasper County).

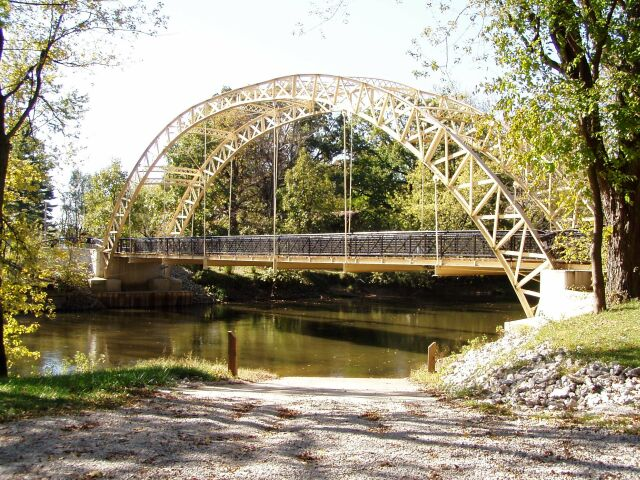
Dunns Bridge over the Kankakee (County Rd 500 E)

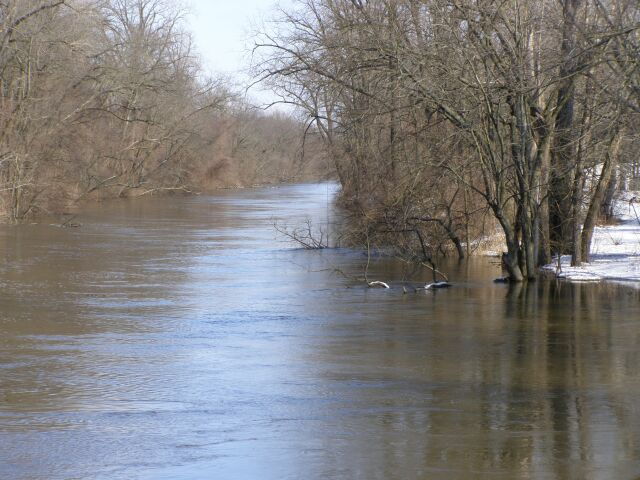
Kankakee River in winter (SR 49)

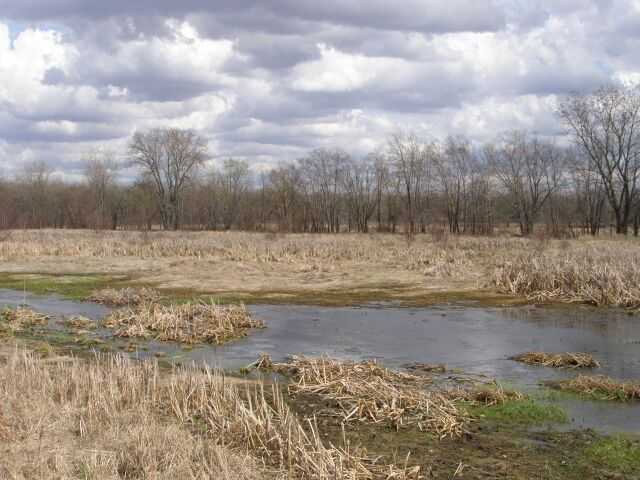
Aukiki Wetland Conservation Area (SR 49 north of Wheatland, Indiana)

=== Jasper County ===
Jasper County is south of the Kankakee River and dotted with sand hills and wetlands. Much of the area has been drained to create farmland, but numerous conservation areas have been established along the river's borders, such as the Aukiki Wetland Conservation Area and the surrounding NIPSCO Savanna.

=== Lake and Newton counties ===
The Kankakee River forms the border between Lake County to the north and Newton County on the south. Along this section of the river, the channel has been straightened, passing between Shelby on the north and Thayer on the south. The LaSalle Fish and Wildlife Area dominates both sides of the river, as it makes its exit from Indiana and enters Illinois.

=== Kankakee County ===
Entering Illinois, the river returns to its natural channel, winding its way to Momence, Illinois. This is the last section of the Grand Kankakee Marsh that has never been ditched. It is at Momence that the river crosses a seven-mile (11 km) limestone shelf, referred to as the Momence Dam. This natural feature's resistance to erosion created a blockage in the flow of the Kankakee River, backing up water and thereby creating the Grand Marsh that once covered 500,000 acres (200,000 ha). The dam's removal is part of the story of the draining the marsh.

Beyond Momence, the river takes on a more traditional image, flowing across the rolling hills of Kankakee County.

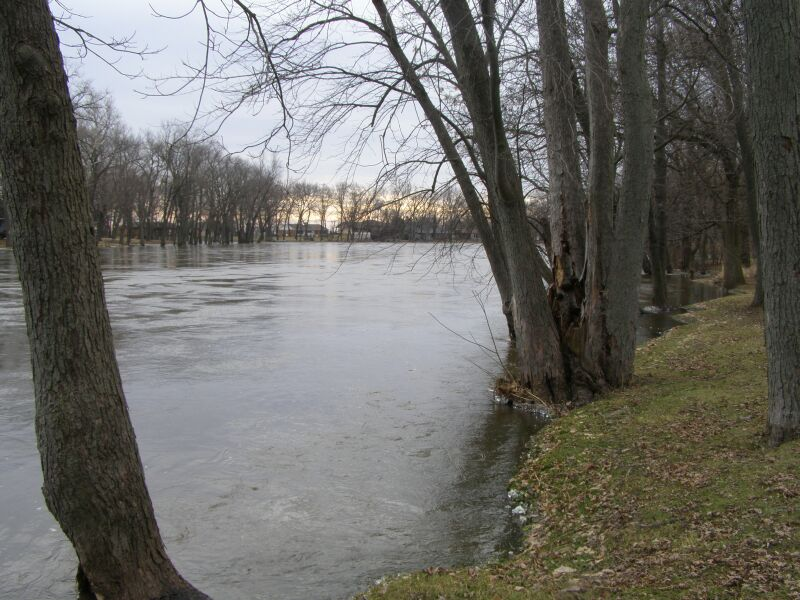
Kankakee River in flood, Momence, Illinois (January 1, 2009)

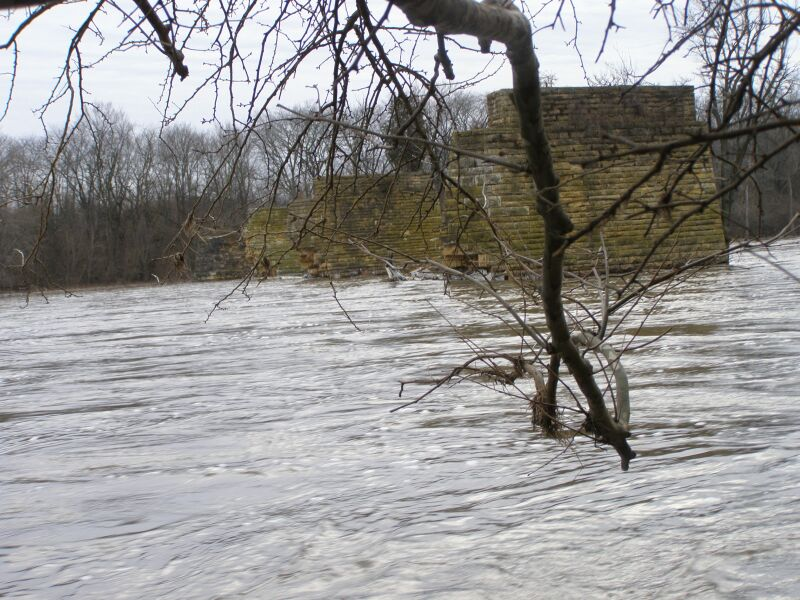
Kankakee River State Park, Old Bridge Piers (January 1, 2009)
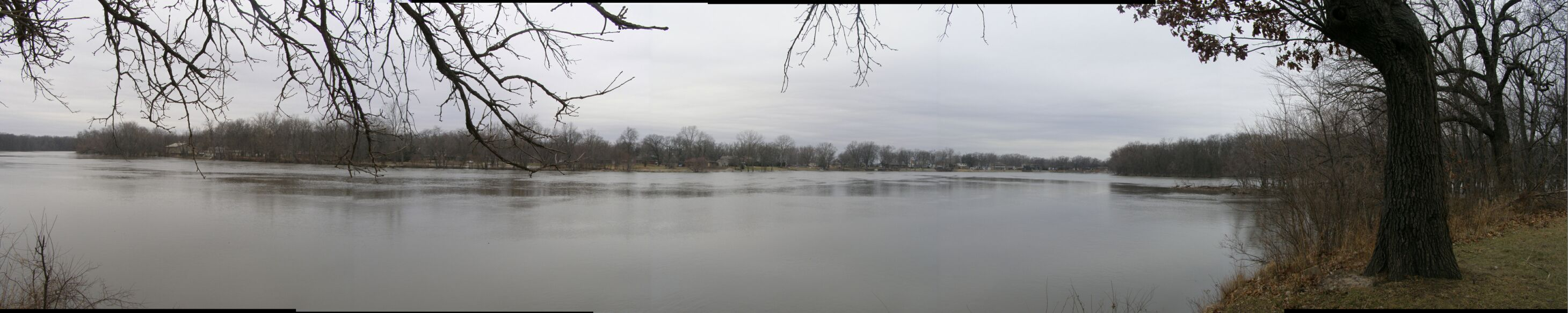
Kankakee River where the Iroquois River (left) joins it, Aroma Park, Illinois (January 1, 2009)
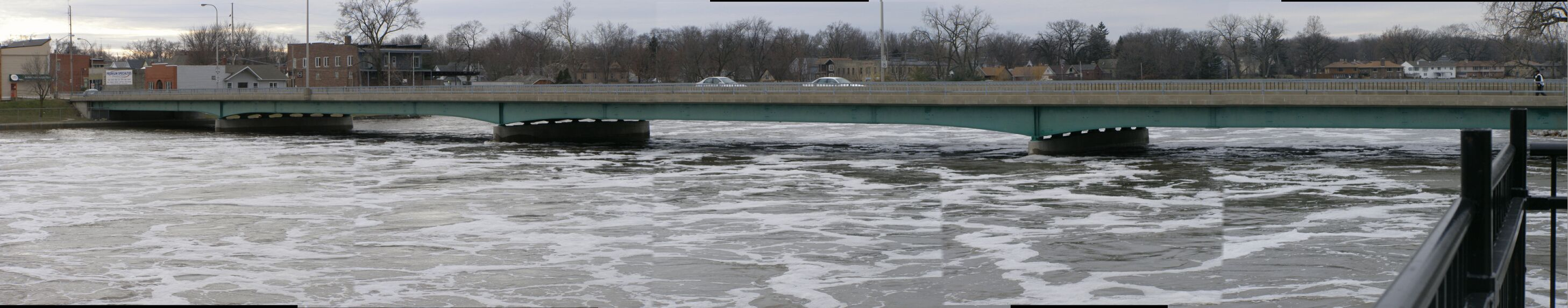
Kankakee River in flood, Kankakee, Illinois (January 1, 2009)

=== Will County ===
The river enters Will County, Illinois, through the city of Wilmington before joining the Des Plaines River. Here, in the Des Plaines Fish and Wildlife Area, the two rivers form the Illinois River for the journey to the Mississippi River.

== Political entities ==
=== Indiana ===
Because of the river's wide valley and historic great marsh, there are few towns on the river throughout the entire length of Indiana. Most towns are located either north or south, on high ground, just outside the marshes. Today, the marshes have been drained and it is not apparent why the towns are so far from the river.

- St. Joseph County
  - Greene Township
    - South Bend
  - Liberty Township
    - North Liberty
  - Lincoln Township
    - Walkerton
  - Olive Township
- LaPorte County
  - Kankakee Township
  - Pleasant Township
  - Lincoln Township
  - Washington Township
    - Kingsbury
  - Johnson Township
  - Union Township
    - Kingsford Heights
  - Noble Township
  - Hanna Township
    - Hanna
  - Clinton Township
  - Prairie Township
  - Cass Township
    - Wanatah
  - Dewey Township
    - LaCrosse
- Starke County
  - Davis Township
    - Hamlet
  - Jackson Township
  - Railroad Township.
    - English Lake — The Yellow River joins the Kankakee River here.
    - Lomax
- Porter County
  - Washington Township
  - Morgan Township
  - Pleasant Township
    - Kouts
  - Union Township
  - Boone Township
    - Hebron
- Jasper County While all of Jasper County is in the Kankakee River basin, most of the county is on the Iroquois River, rather than directly on the Kankakee's main stem.
  - Kankakee Township
  - Wheatfield Township
    - Dunns Bridge
    - Wheatfield
  - Keener Township
    - Baums Bridge
    - DeMotte
- Lake County
  - Winfield Township
    - Winfield
  - Eagle Creek Township
  - Center Township
  - Cedar Creek Township
  - St. John Township
    - St. John
  - Hanover Township
    - Cedar Lake
  - West Creek Township
    - Schneider
    - Shelby
- Newton County Like Jasper County, Newton County is in the Kankakee River basin, but most of the county is on the Iroquois River, and not on the Kankakee's main stem.
  - Lincoln Township
    - Roselawn
    - Thayer
  - Colfax Township
  - Lake Township
    - Sumava Resort
    - Lake Village
  - McClellan Township
  - Beaver Township

=== Illinois ===
- Kankakee County All of Kankakee County is in the Kankakee River basin. About half is on the Iroquois River Branch.
  - Yellowhead Township
  - Momence Township
    - Momence
  - Pembroke Township
  - Sumner Township
  - Ganeer Township
  - Aroma Township This is where the Iroquois River joins the Kankakee River.
  - Rockville Township
  - Bourbonnais Township
  - Kankakee Township
    - City of Kankakee
  - Manteno Township
  - Limestone Township
    - Limestone
  - Salina Township
- Will County
- Grundy County This is where the Kankakee River joins the Des Plaines River to form the Illinois

== Parks and preserves ==
=== Indiana ===
Kankakee River (main stem)

- Rum Village Woods, South Bend, St. Joseph County (bird watching and small mammals)
- Potato Creek State Park, North Liberty, St. Joseph County
- Fish Lake Wildlife Conservation Area, Fish Lake, LaPorte County
- Kingsbury Fish and Wildlife Area, Kingsbury, LaPorte County
- Kankakee Fish and Wildlife Area, English Lake, Starke County
- Koontz Lake Nature Preserve, Koontz Lake, Starke County (black oak savanna & lowland marsh)
- Jasper-Pulaski Fish and Wildlife Area, Radioville, Pulaski County
- Stoutsburg Savanna Nature Preserve, Wheatfield, Jasper County (rolling sand ridges)
- LaSalle Fish and Wildlife Area
- Conrad Savanna Nature Preserve, Conrad, Newton County (black and white oak savanna)
- Kankakee Sands, Morocco, Newton County (nature preserve at site of former Beaver Lake)
- Willow Slough Fish and Wildlife Area, Morocco, Newton County

Yellow River Branch

- Menominees Wildlife Conservation Area, Plymouth, Marshall County

Iroquois River Branch

- Newton County Fair Grounds, Kentland, Newton County

=== Illinois ===
- Des Plaines Fish and Wildlife Area
- Forest Preserves of the Kankakee River Valley
  - Aroma Land and Water Preserve, St. Anne
  - Gar Creek Trail and Prairie Restoration, Kankakee
  - Limestone Reforestation Site, Kankakee
  - Shannon Bayou Environmental Education Center, Aroma Park
  - Strasma Grove, Kankakee
  - Waldron Arboretum, Aroma Park
  - Zeedyk Meadows, St. Anne
- Island Park, Momence
- Kankakee River State Park

== Named for the Kankakee ==
- USS Kankakee (AO-39), a Kennebec-class fleet oiler of the United States Navy built in 1942.
- U.S. Kankakee, a Coast Guard cutter built in 1919 used on the Mississippi River.
- Kankakee, Illinois
- Kankakee River State Park

== See also ==
- List of rivers of Illinois
- List of rivers of Indiana
- Rock Creek (Kankakee River)
- Swamplands Act of 1850
