= La Porte High School =

La Porte or LaPorte High School may refer to:

- LaPorte High School (Indiana), LaPorte, Indiana
- La Porte High School (Texas), La Porte, Texas
