= LaPorte Community School Corporation =

School district in LaPorte, Indiana

Coordinates: 41°36′2.7″N 86°43′15.0″W

LaPorte Community School Corporation (LPCSC) is a school district headquartered in LaPorte, Indiana.

It includes the majority of LaPorte, as well as Kingsbury. The district includes the townships of Center, Pleasant, Scipio, and Washington. It also includes very small portions of Coolspring and Kankakee townships.

== Schools ==
Middle and High Schools:

- LaPorte High School
- LaPorte Middle School

Intermediate School:

- Kesling Intermediate School

Elementary Schools:

- Crichfield Elementary
- Hailmann Elementary
- Handley Elementary
- Indian Trail Elementary
- Kingsbury Elementary
- Kingsford Heights Elementary
- Lincoln Elementary
- Riley Elementary
