= English Lake, Indiana =

- Unincorporated community
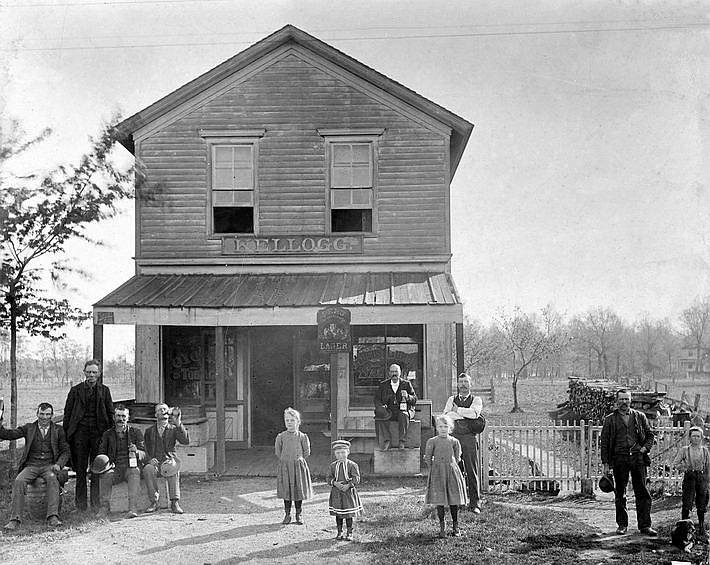
- English Lake Saloon, circa 1892

- Location within Indiana Location within the United States
- Coordinates: 41°15′57″N 86°49′25″W
- Country: United States
- State: Indiana
- County: Starke
- Township: Railroad
- Elevation: 669 ft (204 m)
- Time zone: UTC-6 (Central (CST))
  - Summer (DST): UTC-5 (CDT)
- ZIP code: 46366
- Area code: 574
- FIPS code: 18-18149
- GNIS feature ID: 434205

English Lake is an unincorporated community in Railroad Township, Starke County, in the U.S. state of Indiana, located along the Kankakee River. It is a small community of only a few hundred individuals. It is named for English Lake, which once existed at the junction of the Yellow River with the Kankakee. The headquarters for the Kankakee Fish and Wildlife Area is located at English Lake.

== History ==
The area where the community would develop was first recorded in an 1834 survey by Silvester Sibley. He listed the area as sandy, with rolling hills and trees including oak, hickory, aspen, gum, sassafras, whatleberry, elm, ash, maple, willow, and birch. It also identified that it was in the "great marsh" of the Kankakee. An 1835 survey by Jeremiah Smith likened the area to Hades of Greek mythology. The survey of 1903 identified the lake as the largest in the state of Indiana.

The town of English Lake began as a railroad station in 1860 for the Chicago, Cincinnati and St. Louis Railroad, also known as the Panhandle Route. By 1864, the wildlife of the "Great Marsh" was bringing in hunters from around the country. The English Lake Gun Club was founded in 1864, adjacent to the railroad tracks. In 1897, the Brighton Rod and Gun Club of Brighton Park, Chicago had established a clubhouse along the Panhandle Route. In 1900, the Railroad Club opened a clubhouse in English Lake for the Pennsylvania Railroad workers of Logansport.

A post office was established at English Lake in 1860, and remained in operation until it was discontinued in 1960.

== Geography ==
English Lake is named for the 'lake' that once existed on the Kankakee River. It was the widest part of the river. During the spring floods, it could become 7 miles long and 1 to 2 miles wide. (11 km by 2 to 3 km).

=== Dredging ===
Beginning in 1871, there were efforts to drain the "Great Marsh" to create farmland. The Kankakee Valley Daring Company failed that year due to lack of funds. In 1887 and 1897 additional attempts to create a drainage program failed due to local protests over the assessments to be used to pay for the project. The Craigmile Ditch, a lateral to the Kankakee, was stopped in 1898 when it reached the railway crossing. It was not until 1902, when the courts ruled that the Kankakee could be ditched, that the work really began.

The court case was over a bill passed by the state legislature in 1899 to begin the ditching effort. By October of that year, it had been taken to court. In 1900, the ditching case was elevated to the Circuit Court and there were proposals to change the route and not to assess local land owners for the cost. So far, all the ditching efforts had been upstream of English Lake on either the Yellow River or the Kankakee River. The court decision opened the way for dredging on the main river through the lake. By July 1904, the dredges were into English Lake and working their way upstream. By the end of the year, there were seven dredges at work.
