= Main Poc =

Main Poc (c. 1768–1816), also recorded as Main Poche, Main Pogue, Main Poque, Main Pock; supposedly from the French, meaning "Crippled Hand", was a leader of the Yellow River villages of the Potawatomi Native Americans in the United States. Through his entire life, he fought against the growing strength of the United States and tried to stop the flow of settlers into the Old Northwest. He joined with Tecumseh to push the settlers south and east of the Ohio River and followed him to defeat in Canada during the War of 1812.

== Early years ==
With the Treaty of Greenville (July 1795) peace returned east of the Mississippi River. In Spanish-controlled St. Louis, however, officials had urged the various Indian groups to wage war upon the Osage in 1793. The Potawatomi had been among those to accept the offer, but though incidents of violence did take place, the Lieutenant-Governor of Spanish Illinois summed up the lackluster efforts of his various allies by stating that they "merely pretend to make effective their promises, while even showing the willingness to make peace, in order to frighten us and to attract immense presents..." By the turn of the century the few notable, trans-Mississippi raids that did take place were attributed to only two particular Potawatomi leaders: Turkey Foot of the Tippecanoe and Main Poc of the Kankakee. White settlers in eastern Missouri and southern Illinois were particularly incensed by these forays as raiding parties often pilfered horses and livestock as well as killed a number of homesteaders and travelers .

By 1805, Main Poc had become the sole documented leader of such forays. In the autumn of that year, the United States brokered a treaty with the Osage, promising to protect them from such incursions. Less than a month later, Main Poc carried out his most audacious raid yet, capturing over sixty Osage prisoners. Responding to Osage pressure, the United States did its best to purchase and recover as many of the captives as possible, most of whom had been sold to the Sauk and Mesquakies along the Mississippi in northwestern Illinois. Following the raid, Main Poc's influence in the region greatly increased. Both village chiefs and U.S. officials alike courted him in an attempt to further their own political ends. Able to support his followers upon their largess, Main Poc refrained from raiding for almost five years.

== With Tecumseh ==
When Tecumseh and his brother the Prophet sent messengers among the Potawatomi in 1807, Main Poc readily gave support. While his given name was Wenebeset ("Crafty One"), he was known as "Main Poc", meaning "Withered Hand" in French. He had a crippled left hand. All the fingers and thumb were missing. He had risen as a shaman and had visions and contact with the spirits. The fall of 1808 found Main Poc visiting the Shawnee Prophet at his village on the Auglaize River in Ohio. He went in November and spent two months among the Shawnees. Main Poc spent the winter at Fort Wayne, where he had been invited by the Indian Agent to winter. While the Americans saw this as a sign of loyalty by the Potawatomi chief, Main Poc continued to declare his independence from American demands. When Main Poc returned to his village on the Kankakee and again prepared for war against the Osage, the American Agents proposed to send Main Poc and a delegation to Washington, D.C. He was in Washington by December and met with President Thomas Jefferson. He returned home in the spring of 1809. With the depletion of the food stocks at Prophetstown, which the prophet had moved to the previous summer, the Potawatomi warriors were returning to their own villages. Main Poc did likewise and spent a quiet spring on the Kankakee.

The following year (1810), Prophetstown was again growing and Main Poc moved there in June. The combined Indian nations were planning their attacks against the American posts. Main Poc was to lead a force of Potawatomi against Fort Dearborn (Chicago).

In July 1810, a series of Potawatomi raids against the Osage increased the tension between the Americans and the Potawatomi. When Gomo of the Lake Peoria Potawatomi went to St. Louis in September to profess friendship with the Americans and to promise to restrain the Illinois Potawatomi warriors. Main Poc had spent the summer in western Illinois raiding the scattered settlements and in November led a raid against the Osage. During the raid, Main Poc was wounded and could not walk or ride. He was ferried down the Missouri and up the Mississippi to a village near Portage des Sioux, where he spent the winter of 1810–11. In April, the recovered Main Poc moved his village to Crow Prairie at the northern end of Lake Peoria. From this new village, Main Poc led raids against the American settlements and skirmished with the militia units. A delegation was sent to the Peoria villages of Gomo in an attempt to end the raids. Main Poc did not attend and the Peoria villages had not joined with Main Poc's warriors in the raids. The expedition returned south without gaining a cessation to the attacks. Instead, Main Poc journeyed north to the Rock River Sauk and then to the Kickapoo villages on the Kankakee. Obtaining their allegiance, Main Poc traveled to the British post at Amherstburg (across from Detroit) to spend the winter of 1811 in Canada.

Harrison marched on Tippecanoe during August 1812 in an attempt to end the raids on the Illinois frontier. His victory ended the Indian Confederacy. But, Main Poc remained in Canada, sending Wabameme to the Potawatomi villages around Lake Michigan preparing them for war. In March 1812, an American delegation traveled the Illinois River inviting the Potawatomi to Cahokia for a council of peace. The council achieved little as the chiefs hostile to the Americans, like Main Poc did not attend. By July, word was received among the warriors following Tecumseh that Main Poc was returning from the British with kegs of powder. Plans went forward for the destruction of Fort Dearborn. By this time, Main Poc was considered by the American military as second only to Tecumseh in influence among the pro-British warriors. Main Poc spent the summer on southern Lake Michigan, but his influence was felt as his messengers continued to counsel war among the Potawatomi villages. Main Poc and Shabbona were in Canada at the siege of Detroit, while Blackbird and Mad Sturgeon lead the attack (August 15, 1812) on Fort Dearborn (Chicago). On August 5, the Potawatomi led by Tecumseh turned back the American's at the Battle of Brownstown. Four days later, Caldwell and Main Poc at Monguaga ambushed another column sent to relieve Detroit.

Many Potawatomi joined with Tecumseh in support of the British as they retreated from Detroit into the southern Canada. They were defeated at the Battle of the Thames (October 5, 1813). Main Poc had remained near Detroit, planning to attack Governor Harrison's supply columns. When the American Brigadier General Duncan McArthur, stationed to protect Detroit and the supply route, extended a truce to the nations of the lower lakes. Harrison at first refused to let the Potawatomi join. He relented to insure peace on the frontier and Topinbee, Five Medals and Main Poc signed for the Potawatomi.

== After the Battle of the Thames ==
In summer 1814, most of the tribes of the Old Northwest, including the pro-American chiefs of the Potawatomi, signed a peace treaty with the American government. Main Poc and the other pro-British Potawatomi chiefs (Moran, Mad Sturgeon, and Chebass) refused to attend the peace conference, instead moving with their followers into northern Indiana and southeastern Michigan. Main Poc settled a new village on the Yellow River (between Knox and Plymouth). From here, he and other pro-British chieftains launched a series of raids against Fort Harrison (modern Terre Haute). The American government ordered MacArthur to raise a thousand militiamen and crush Main Poc and his allies. The Potawatomi in northern Indiana learned of these plans, and immediately called on the Potawatomi of northern Illinois and the Odawa of the Grand River to send aid. They assembled 800 warriors along the St. Joseph River (Lake Michigan) to meet MacArthur's expedition, and acquired supplies of gunpowder from British fur traders. MacArthur assembled 600 men but decided that the Potawatomi along the St. Joseph were too strong to attack. Instead, he burned the villages of some pro-American Potawatomi on the Huron River and launched a brief raid into Upper Canada. In 1815, the news arrived that the Treaty of Ghent had ended the conflict between the Americans and the British. Main Poc was at Mackinac when the British commander notified the Indian allies of the peace treaty. When invited to Spring Wells (near Detroit), to sit in a council of peace, Main Poc refused to attend. As peace came to the frontier, the mixed-blood tribal members were taking on leadership roles. Main Poc died in 1816, furthering the trend to leaders who were comfortable in both the Potawatomi villages and the American trading companies.
