= Rock Creek (Kankakee River tributary) =

- Rock Creek near its mouth

Physical characteristics
- Source
  - location: Monee Township, Will County, Illinois
  - coordinates: 41°24′14″N 87°43′51″W
- Mouth
  - location: Confluence with the Kankakee River near Bourbonnais, Illinois
  - coordinates: 41°12′12″N 87°59′10″W
  - elevation: 558 ft (170 m)
- Length: 25 mi (40 km)

Basin features
- Progression: Rock Creek → Kankakee → Illinois → Mississippi → Gulf of Mexico
- GNIS ID: 416805

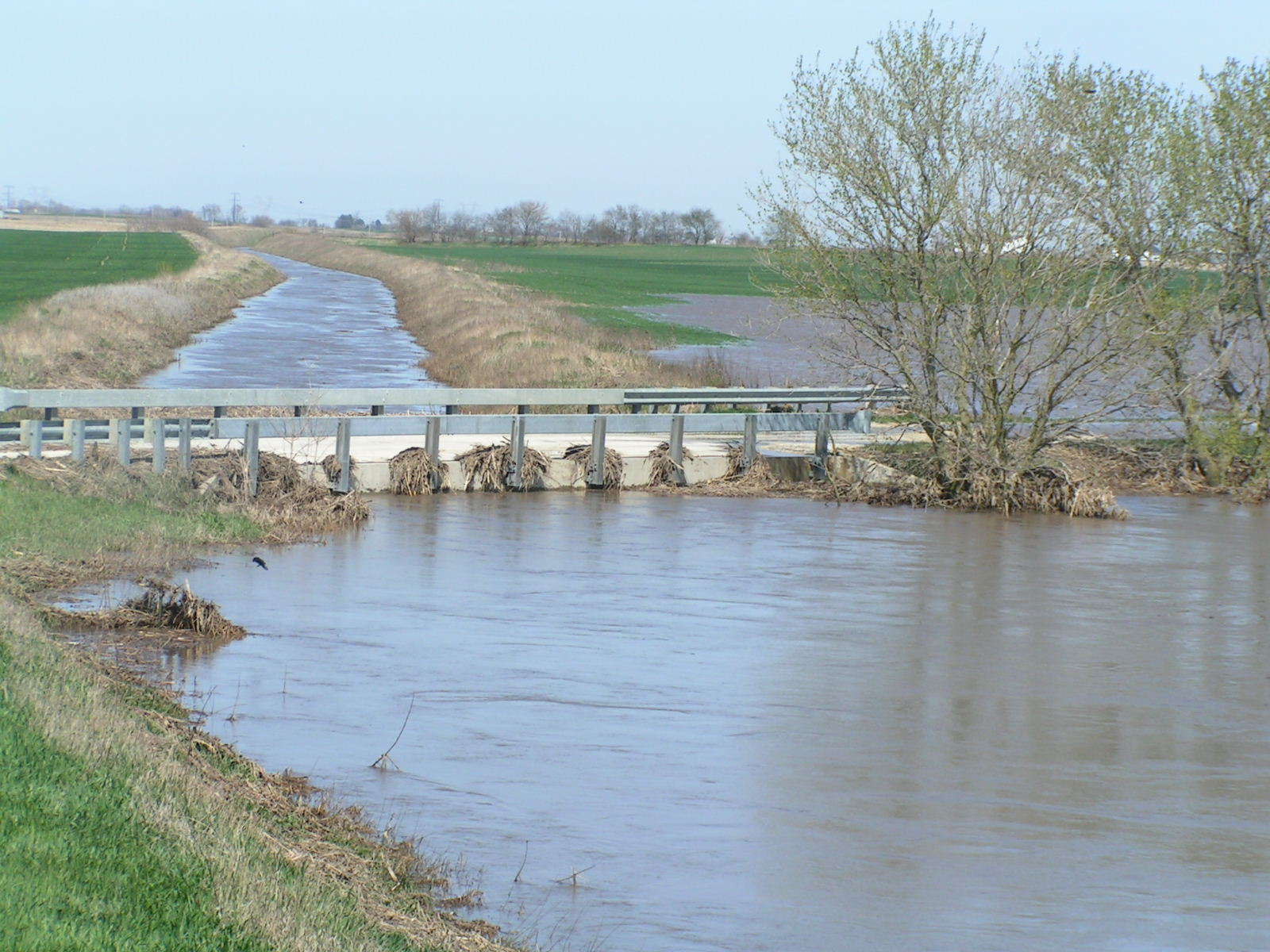
A bridge over Rock Creek northeast of Manteno, Illinois, as flood water recedes in April 2006

Rock Creek is a 24.7-mile-long (39.8 km) tributary of the Kankakee River in the U.S. state of Illinois. It empties into the Kankakee River in Kankakee River State Park, northwest of Kankakee, Illinois. It starts in higher land and then drops into the Kankakee River Valley. Because of this, the river has cut through the rock, forming a gorge, most of which is in the state park. A trail in the park follows the creek. The Rock Creek waterfall is approximately 1.5 miles (2.4 km) upstream from the main entrance of the state park and is on land owned by Camp Shaw-waw-nas-see, a private youth camp. The cliffs reach as much as 80 feet (24 m) high in the area from the park entrance to the falls.

The stream is a very popular smallmouth bass fishing destination for many northern and central area Illinois residents. Twice per year, the Illinois DNR stocks trout in the creek as well, creating an opportunity for spin or fly fishing.

== Other streams ==
The U.S. Geographic Names Information System (GNIS) shows 12 streams named Rock Creek in the state of Illinois.
