= Kankakee Fish and Wildlife Area =

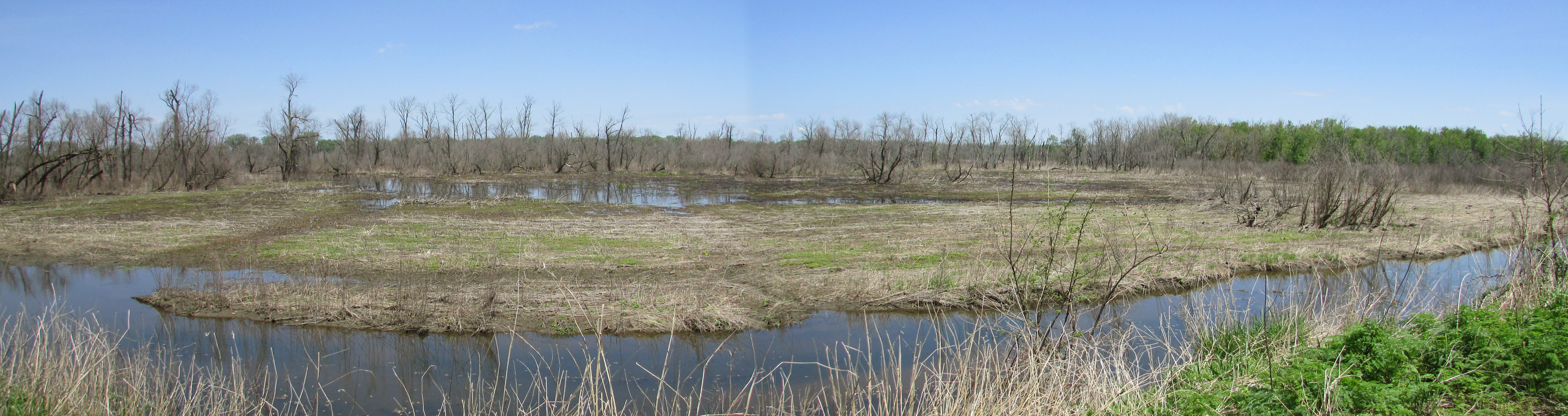
- Wetland restoration area.
- Interactive map of Kankakee Fish and Wildlife Area
- Type: Fish and Wildlife Area
- Location: Starke County USA
- Nearest city: Knox, Indiana
- Coordinates: 41°18.229′N 86°45.303′W
- Area: 4,295 acres (17.38 km^{2})
- Created: 1927
- Operator: Indiana DNR
- Features: Wildlife Viewing; Ice Fishing; Hunting; Trapping; Boat Ramp (motors permitted)

The Kankakee Fish and Wildlife Area is situated in Starke County at the junction of the Yellow River with the Kankakee River. The state purchased 2,312 acres (9.36 km^{2}) of marshland in 1927 for a Works Progress Administration (WPA) transient camp. The camp consisted of up to 400 men. After the camp closed, it was established as a game preserve. In the 1950s waterfowl management was begun. In 1982 another 1,016 acres (4.11 km^{2}) were added and in 1992 an additional 767 acres (3.10 km^{2}). The Fish and Wildlife area consist of the wetlands between the Yellow River and the Kankakee at their junction and uplands on both the north bank of the Kankakee and the south bank of the Yellow. The main entrance to the area is on Indiana State Road 39 at Indiana State Road 8.

The wildlife area is a remnant of the Grand Kankakee Marsh. The Grand Kankakee Marsh was known worldwide for its waterfowl. Stories are told of skies blackened by the wings of countless numbers of ducks and geese.

== History ==
In 1923, 2,300 acres (930 ha) of the former English Lake were acquired as a game preserve, though timber theft necessitated legal intervention. Later managed by the Division of Fish and Game as the Kankakee Fish and Wildlife Area, the preserve prohibited hunting but permitted fishing in boundary ditches. Unsuitable for agriculture, the land supported recovering populations of muskrats and prairie chickens, and planted with corn and buckwheat to sustain bird populations such as ring-necked pheasants.

In 1936, the preserve added 1,200 acres (490 ha), creating a lake and marsh that bolstered waterfowl populations, including mallards, teal, and wood ducks. The preserve currently holds 4,199 acres (1,699 ha) of habitat.

During the Great Depression, the Works Progress Administration and the Civilian Conservation Corps expanded the wetland preserves within the Kankakee Fish and Wildlife Area and also the Jasper-Pulaski Fish and Wildlife Area to restore bird habitats and historic flyways.

== Hunting ==
Kankakee Fish & Wildlife Area has hunting opportunities for deer, turkey, waterfowl, small-game, and furbearers. Call or see staff for more information.

== Fishing ==
The Kankakee Fish & Wildlife Area has two boat ramps. One in English Lake (juncture of the Yellow and Kankakee Rivers and the other on the Kankakee at Indiana State Road 39. Common fish caught in the Kankakee River include; Large mouth and Small mouth Bass, catfish, and Northern Pike. Common fish in the Yellow River are; Small mouth Bass, catfish, and Walleye. The most common fish that live in the swampy ditches adjacent to the rivers are the bowfin which can often be caught on spinnerbaits or topwater lures.

== Wildlife Watching ==
The area consist of 4,095 acres (16.57 km^{2}) of riparian woodlands, wetlands, marsh and farm land. A variety of birds can be seen in the area, including: wild turkey, ducks, geese, other waterfowl, hawks, owls, osprey, bald eagle and a wide variety of neo-tropical species.

== Department of Natural Resources ==
The Indiana Department of Natural Resources manages the area. The local office is at 4320 W Toto Rd., PO Box 77, North Judson, IN 46366, (574) 896-3522
