= Des Plaines Fish and Wildlife Area =

State park in Will County, Illinois, US

- IUCN category V (protected landscape/seascape)

- Location within Illinois Location within the United States
- Location: Will County, Illinois, USA
- Nearest city: Wilmington
- Coordinates: 41°23′36″N 88°12′36″W
- Area: 5,000 acres (2,023 ha)
- Established: 1948
- Governing body: Illinois Department of Natural Resources

Des Plaines Fish and Wildlife Area is an Illinois state park on 5,000 acres (2,023 ha) in Will County, Illinois, United States. It is located on floodplain adjacent to the confluence of its namesake the Des Plaines River and the Kankakee River to form the Illinois River.

== History ==
Prior to 1948 what is now called the Des Plaines Fish and Wildlife Area was owned by the federal government. The Illinois Department of Conservation acquired the site in 1948 and established its use as a recreation area. Additional land was accessed following the completion of Interstate 55 in the 1960s. From that time to 1975, the area was used primarily by hunters and unmanaged day use. The Division of Land Management took over the area in 1976 and since then, extensive upgrading of facilities has occurred. In recent years, more than 350,000 people annually visit Des Plaines—an area of over 5,000 acres, with approximately 200 acres of water.

== Recreation ==
=== Picnicking ===
There are available facilities along the Kankakee River or under the shelter on the banks of Milliken Lake. The sites provide tables, stoves and water. A playground area is also available at the Milliken Lake site.

=== Fishing ===
Open water and Ice fishing are popular. Milliken Lake, as well other bodies of water have panfish, catfish, and bass. The lake is stocked with catchable trout in the spring. The Kankakee River is popular with boaters for walleye and northern pike.

=== Camping ===
Camping areas were closed permanently in March 2010, due to lack of funding.

=== Boating ===
A public boat launch with 3 paved ramps is available on the Kankakee River for boating on the river or its backwaters. Motors are limited to 10 horsepower or less on the backwaters, but there are no limits on the Kankakee River. No boating is allowed on Milliken Lake.

=== Equestrian trail ===
A twelve-mile trail is open from mid April through October weather permitting. The trail hours are 6 a.m. to 10 p.m.

=== Hunting ===
Pheasant hunting is the most popular choice for sportsmen at Des Plaines, and the largest pheasant hunting (by permit only) facility in the state is located at the site. For variety, however, there are unlimited numbers of deer, rabbit, dove, and coyote. All hunters are required to have permits and check in at the site office. Waterfowl hunting is available at the nearby Will County Waterfowl Management Area, with hunting blinds being allocated via drawings.

=== Range ===
==== Hand trap range ====
Two hand trap ranges and an archery range are open to the public daily except during pheasant hunting season.

==== Shooting sports ====
In addition to the two hand trap ranges and the archery range. Des Plaines hosts three wingshooting clinics and two Hunter Safety Classes annually. The wingshooting clinics are held on the first weekend following Mother's Day (Youth and Ladies Clinics), on the first weekend in June and the third weekend in September (both are for experienced shooters); the Hunters Safety Classes are available in June and August.

== Grant Creek Prairie and Des Plaines Dolomite Prairies ==
Included within Des Plaines Fish and Wildlife Area is the 78-acre Grant Creek Prairie Nature Preserve and the 575-acre Des Plaines Dolomite Prairies Land and Water Reserve. Both contain prairie communities; the latter includes 9 acres of rare, dry-mesic dolomite prairie, constituting 50% of the remaining natural community of that type in Illinois.

== Dog training ==
The Des Plaines Fish and Wildlife Area is well known for numerous field trials and dog training events held throughout the year.

== Disabled access ==
The following programs have disabled accessibility: Hunting, Fishing, Camping, and Picnicking.
