= Kingsbury, Indiana =

Town of Kingsbury, Indiana
- Town
- Location of Kingsbury in LaPorte County, Indiana.
- Coordinates: 41°31′49″N 86°41′50″W
- Country: United States
- State: Indiana
- County: LaPorte
- Township: Washington

Area
  - Total: 0.59 sq mi (1.53 km^{2})
  - Land: 0.59 sq mi (1.53 km^{2})
  - Water: 0 sq mi (0.00 km^{2})
- Elevation: 751 ft (229 m)

Population (2020)
  - Total: 190
  - Density: 321/sq mi (123.8/km^{2})
- Time zone: UTC-6 (CST)
  - Summer (DST): UTC-5 (CDT)
- ZIP code: 46345
- Area code: 219
- FIPS code: 18-39816
- GNIS feature ID: 2397018

Kingsbury is a town in Washington Township, LaPorte County, Indiana, just northwest of the intersection of U.S. Route 35 and U.S. Route 6. The town was founded in 1835 and incorporated on March 3, 1941. During 1940 and 1941, the Kingsbury Ordnance Plant was built for use during World War II; the plant briefly reopened during the Korean War before closing permanently, and parts are now the Kingsbury Fish and Wildlife Area and the Kingsbury Industrial Park. Kingsford Heights was built as its housing. As of the 2020 census, Kingsbury had a population of 190. It is included in the Michigan City, Indiana-La Porte, Indiana Metropolitan Statistical Area. The town has its own fire department, KVFD (Kingsbury Volunteer Fire Department), and a Greek revival style First Baptist church built in 1851 with its own graveyard and Winchell Cemetery.

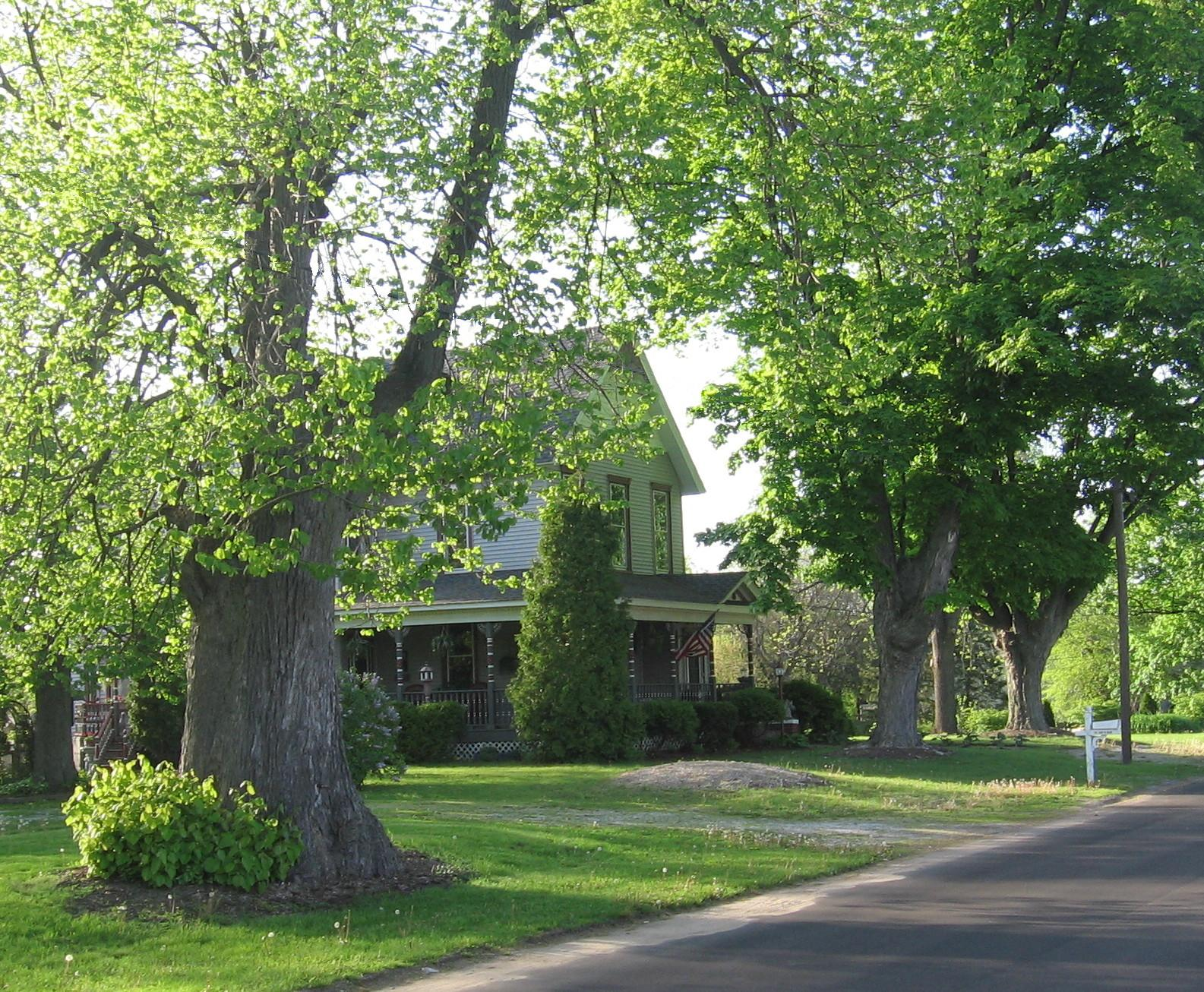
South Main Street, in Kingsbury, Indiana

== Geography ==
According to the 2010 census, Kingsbury has a total area of 0.57 square miles (1.48 km^{2}), all land.

== Demographics ==
Historical population
Census	Pop.	Note	%±
1880	154		—
1950	281		—
1960	281		0.0%
1970	314		11.7%
1980	329		4.8%
1990	258		−21.6%
2000	229		−11.2%
2010	242		5.7%
2020	190		−21.5%
U.S. Decennial Census

=== 2000 census ===
As of the census of 2000, there were 229 people, 90 households, and 68 families living in the town. The population density was 391.8 inhabitants per square mile (151.3/km^{2}). There were 94 housing units at an average density of 160.8 per square mile (62.1/km^{2}). The racial makeup of the town was 99.56% White and 0.44% Native American.

There were 90 households, out of which 25.6% had children under the age of 18 living with them, 62.2% were married couples living together, 10.0% had a female householder with no husband present, and 24.4% were non-families. 16.7% of all households were made up of individuals, and 6.7% had someone living alone who was 65 years of age or older. The average household size was 2.54 and the average family size was 2.81.

In the town, the population was spread out, with 22.7% under the age of 18, 10.0% from 18 to 24, 29.3% from 25 to 44, 23.1% from 45 to 64, and 14.8% who were 65 years of age or older. The median age was 38 years. For every 100 females, there were 81.7 males. For every 100 females age 18 and over, there were 84.4 males.

The median income for a household in the town was $50,000, and the median income for a family was $53,438. Males had a median income of $40,417 versus $22,500 for females. The per capita income for the town was $18,096. About 4.6% of families and 9.7% of the population were below the poverty line, including 10.9% of those under the age of eighteen and none of those 65 or over.

=== 2010 census ===
As of the census of 2010, there were 242 people, 91 households, and 69 families living in the town. The population density was 424.6 inhabitants per square mile (163.9/km^{2}). There were 96 housing units at an average density of 168.4 per square mile (65.0/km^{2}). The racial makeup of the town was 97.1% White, 0.4% African American, 0.4% Native American, and 2.1% from other races. Hispanic or Latino of any race were 5.4% of the population.

There were 91 households, of which 35.2% had children under the age of 18 living with them, 63.7% were married couples living together, 6.6% had a female householder with no husband present, 5.5% had a male householder with no wife present, and 24.2% were non-families. 19.8% of all households were made up of individuals, and 13.2% had someone living alone who was 65 years of age or older. The average household size was 2.66 and the average family size was 3.06.

The median age in the town was 39.8 years. 25.2% of residents were under the age of 18; 6.6% were between the ages of 18 and 24; 29.4% were from 25 to 44; 22.7% were from 45 to 64; and 16.1% were 65 years of age or older. The gender makeup of the town was 49.6% male and 50.4% female.

== Education ==
The school district is La Porte Community School Corporation. The district's sole comprehensive high school is LaPorte High School.
