= Rockville Township, Kankakee County, Illinois =

Rockville Township
- Township
- Location in Kankakee County

- Kankakee County's location in Illinois
- Coordinates: 41°15′09″N 87°56′52″W
- Country: United States
- State: Illinois
- County: Kankakee
- Established: May 9, 1853

Government
  - Supervisor: Richard Moran

Area
  - Total: 36.6 sq mi (95 km^{2})
  - Land: 36.45 sq mi (94.4 km^{2})
  - Water: 0.15 sq mi (0.39 km^{2}) 0.41%
- Elevation: 640 ft (195 m)

Population (2020)
  - Total: 756
  - Density: 20.7/sq mi (8.01/km^{2})
- Time zone: UTC-6 (CST)
  - Summer (DST): UTC-5 (CDT)
- ZIP codes: 60901, 60914, 60950
- FIPS code: 17-091-65195

Rockville Township is one of seventeen townships in Kankakee County, Illinois, USA. As of the 2020 census, its population was 756 and it contained 325 housing units. It was formerly a township of Will County until Kankakee County was created. The township's name may have been derived from a Potawatomi village known to the pioneers as "Little Rock Village."

== Geography ==
According to the 2021 census gazetteer files, Rockville Township has a total area of 36.60 square miles (94.79 km^{2}), of which 36.45 square miles (94.41 km^{2}) (or 99.59%) is land and 0.15 square miles (0.39 km^{2}) (or 0.41%) is water.

=== Unincorporated towns ===
- Deselm at 41.249476°N 87.974494°W
- Flickerville at 41.220032°N 87.956159°W

(This list is based on USGS data and may include former settlements.)

=== Adjacent townships ===
- Wilton Township, Will County (north)
- Peotone Township, Will County (northeast)
- Manteno Township (east)
- Bourbonnais Township (southeast)
- Limestone Township (south)
- Salina Township (southwest)
- Custer Township, Will County (west)
- Wesley Township, Will County (west)

=== Cemeteries ===
The township contains these two cemeteries: Blooms Grove and DeSelm.

=== Airports and landing strips ===
- Moran Landing Strip
- Neiner Airport

=== Landmarks ===
- Kankakee River State Park (north edge)
- Kankakee River State Park (north quarter)
- Kankakee River State Park (vast majority)

== Demographics ==
As of the 2020 census there were 756 people, 231 households, and 189 families residing in the township. The population density was 20.65 inhabitants per square mile (7.97/km^{2}). There were 325 housing units at an average density of 8.88 per square mile (3.43/km^{2}). The racial makeup of the township was 94.58% White, 0.66% African American, 0.00% Native American, 0.13% Asian, 0.00% Pacific Islander, 1.19% from other races, and 3.44% from two or more races. Hispanic or Latino of any race were 1.72% of the population.

There were 231 households, out of which 23.80% had children under the age of 18 living with them, 74.03% were married couples living together, 5.19% had a female householder with no spouse present, and 18.18% were non-families. 18.20% of all households were made up of individuals, and 10.00% had someone living alone who was 65 years of age or older. The average household size was 2.77 and the average family size was 3.14.

The township's age distribution consisted of 20.7% under the age of 18, 8.0% from 18 to 24, 26.3% from 25 to 44, 30.7% from 45 to 64, and 14.4% who were 65 years of age or older. The median age was 42.4 years. For every 100 females, there were 113.7 males. For every 100 females age 18 and over, there were 134.1 males.

The median income for a household in the township was $96,477, and the median income for a family was $107,292. Males had a median income of $66,667 versus $36,250 for females. The per capita income for the township was $37,269. About 3.2% of families and 3.4% of the population were below the poverty line, including 5.3% of those under age 18 and 9.8% of those age 65 or over.

Historical population
Census	Pop.	Note	%±
2000	783		—
2010	879		12.3%
2020	756		−14.0%
U.S. Decennial Census

== Government ==
The township is governed by an elected Town Board of a Supervisor and four Trustees. The Township also has an elected Assessor, Clerk, Highway Commissioner and Supervisor. The Township Garage is located on Manteno-Deselm Road, Manteno Illinois 60950

== Political districts ==
- Illinois's 11th congressional district
- State House District 79
- State Senate District 40

== Schools ==
Rockville Township used to have 2 schools. Taylor Schoolhouse was a one-room school located near Deselm which opened in 1905 and closed in 1954. Deselm School was located in Deselm and that school also closed in 1954 when the schools were consolidated into the Manteno school district.

=== School districts ===
- Manteno Community Unit School District 5
- Peotone Community Unit School District 207-U
