= Deselm, Illinois =

- Unincorporated community
- Location within Illinois Location within the United States
- Coordinates: 41°14′58″N 87°58′28″W
- Country: United States
- State: Illinois
- County: Kankakee
- Township: Rockville
- Named after: John B. Deselm
- Elevation: 682 ft (208 m)
- Time zone: UTC-6 (Central (CST))
  - Summer (DST): UTC-5 (CDT)
- Area codes: 815 & 779
- GNIS feature ID: 407148

Deselm is an unincorporated community in Kankakee County, in the U.S. state of Illinois.

== History ==
A post office was established at Deselm in 1867, and remained in operation until 1902.

John B. Deselm, the first postmaster, gave the community its name.
