= Little Rock Village =

- Village
- Location in Illinois
- Coordinates: 41°12′12″N 87°59′10″W
- Country: United States
- State: Illinois
- County: Will
- Established: Unknown

Population
  - Total: 0
- Time zone: UTC-6 (CST)
  - Summer (DST): UTC-5 (CDT)

Little Rock Village was a Native American village of the Potawatomi people located on the north bank of the Kankakee River, at a site close to the current boundary between Kankakee and Will counties of the state of Illinois in the United States. The location now lies within the present-day Kankakee River State Park, close to the mouth of Rock Creek on Kankakee River.
