= Kankakee River State Park =

State park in Illinois, USA

- IUCN category III (natural monument or feature)
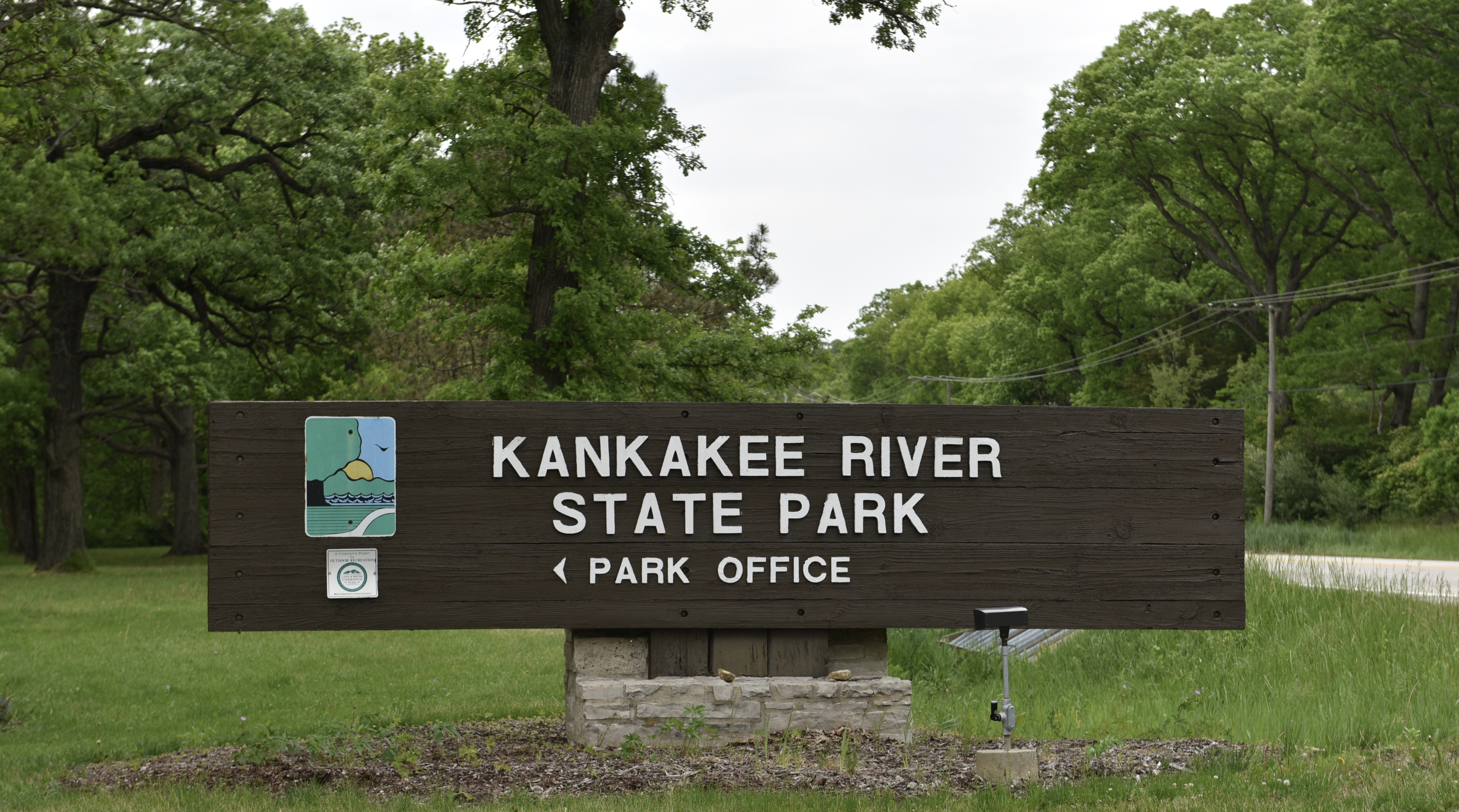
- Park entrance

- Location within Illinois Location within the United States
- Location: Kankakee and Will Counties, Illinois, USA
- Nearest city: Bourbonnais, Illinois
- Coordinates: 41°12′47″N 88°01′23″W
- Area: 4,000 acres (1,619 ha)
- Established: 1938
- Governing body: Illinois Department of Natural Resources

Kankakee River State Park is an Illinois state park on 4,000 acres (1,619 ha) primarily in Kankakee and Will Counties, Illinois, United States. Originally, 35 acres (14 ha) of land was donated by Ethel Sturges Dummer for the creation of the state park in 1938. Another 1,715 acres (694 ha) was donated by Commonwealth Edison in 1956, which again donated more land in 1989. The islands of Smith, Hoffman, Langham, and Willow are all located inside the park on the Kankakee River.

== History ==
Before the arrival of Europeans, Native Americans occupied the Kankakee River valley in the area that is now the state park. This region was historically occupied by Illini and Miami Indians in the 1670s and 1680s. By 1685 the Miami were sufficiently numerous that the Kankakee River was called the River of the Miami. Kickapoo and Mascouten also frequented the river valley in the 18th century. By the 1770s, the Council of Three Fires—the Chippewa, Ottawa and Potawatomi nations—dominated the area. The most extensive village was "Rock Village" or "Little Rock Village" inside the present-day park near the mouth of Rock Creek. In 1830 it was the site of the last great Indian Council. After 1832, the Potawatomi ceded all of their land along the Kankakee and Illinois rivers to the United States. Most Potawatomi left the area by the end of the decade, except for Chief Shaw-waw-nas-see, whose grave is commemorated by a boulder along the nature trail at Rock Creek.

Noel Le Vasseur and other fur traders, including Hubbard Chabare and Francois Bourbonnais, traded with the Potawatomi along the Kankakee and Iroquois rivers in the 1820s. When the Potawatomi left the area in 1838, Le Vasseur persuaded a number of his fellow French Canadians to emigrate from Quebec to the Bourbonnais Township area. Because of his settlement efforts, he is called "the father of Kankakee".

The Kankakee & Iroquois Navigation Company - later known as the Kankakee Company - was chartered in 1847 to provide water power and a navigable waterway from the Illinois & Michigan Canal to Warner's Landing, along the site of the present-day Warner Bridge Road. The company failed shortly after the Wabash Railroad arrived in the 1880s. At the Chippewa Campground, hand-cut limestone pillars mark where a railway bridge was to have been built for the Decatur and State Line Railroad before financiers ran out of money.

A major industry in the area in the 1890s was the Custer Bowery Amusement Park, which drew crowds from Chicago. The park was gone by the 1920s, and the river was a popular for summer cottages. In 1938 Chicago resident Ethel Sturges Dummer donated 35 acres (14 ha) of land for a state park. Commonwealth Edison turned over another 1,715 acres (694 ha) to the state in 1956. With the company's additional grants in 1989, the park now roughly totals 4,000 acres (1,619 ha).

== Camping ==
There are camping facilities located inside the park. Potawatomi Campground, offers Class A amenities with 110 sites and two Rent-a-Cabins in a wooded setting. The Chippewa Campground, offers 105 sites with Class B electric and C facilities. Reservations are taken for Kankakee River Class A, B, and C campgrounds. All campsites share a picnic table and a camp grill. Camping is only allowed in the campgrounds. The Equestrian Campground off Illinois Route 113 is open only from April 1 through October 31.basis

== Hiking ==
There are plenty of hiking trails throughout the park that go through different ecosystems and different park features. While some go along the Kankakee River, with places to sit along the river, others go into the forests or along Rock Creek, a tributary of the Kankakee River that cuts through the ground, creating a gorge with cliffs. The trails are very diverse. The site is very good for mushroom hunting.

The park's trails stretch along both sides of the river. Hiking, biking and cross-country ski trails are on the river's north side. Horse and snowmobile trails can be found on the south. A 3-mile (4.8 km) route along Rock Creek lets hikers take in the beauty of limestone canyons and a waterfall. A bicycle trail begins at Davis Creek Area and travels 10.5 miles (16.9 km) of trails in the form of a linear trail along the river and a loop in the west end of the park. When there's snow cover of 4 inches (100 mm) or more, the park is open from sunrise to sunset for snowmobiling. Directional signs for trails are posted and maps are available at the park office.

== Horseback Riding ==
There is horseback riding at the park. A 12-mile (19 km) equestrian trail is located in the wildlife management area along Route 113 and is open April 1 through October 31.

== Fishing ==
Fishing at Kankakee River State Park provides opportunities for anglers to access the Kankakee River or Rock Creek, a freestone-bottom tributary of the Kankakee River. Access to commonly targeted fish species, like bass or bluegill is available year round. Fishing by bait, spin fishing, and fly-fishing at Kankakee River State Park are popular methods. Twice a year, the Illinois DNR runs a trout stocking program, releasing fish in various lakes and ponds in the spring and fall. Prior to the official trout season opening day, a catch-and-release only period is offered to anglers looking to get an early access to the stocked trout.

== Concessions ==
There is a concession stand at Rock Creek which operates on a seasonal basis. The store offers refreshments, ice, camping supplies, firewood, and bait. It is located in the log cabin concession stand, just inside the park's main entrance. Hunting and fishing licenses are available as well.
