= LaPorte High School (Indiana) =

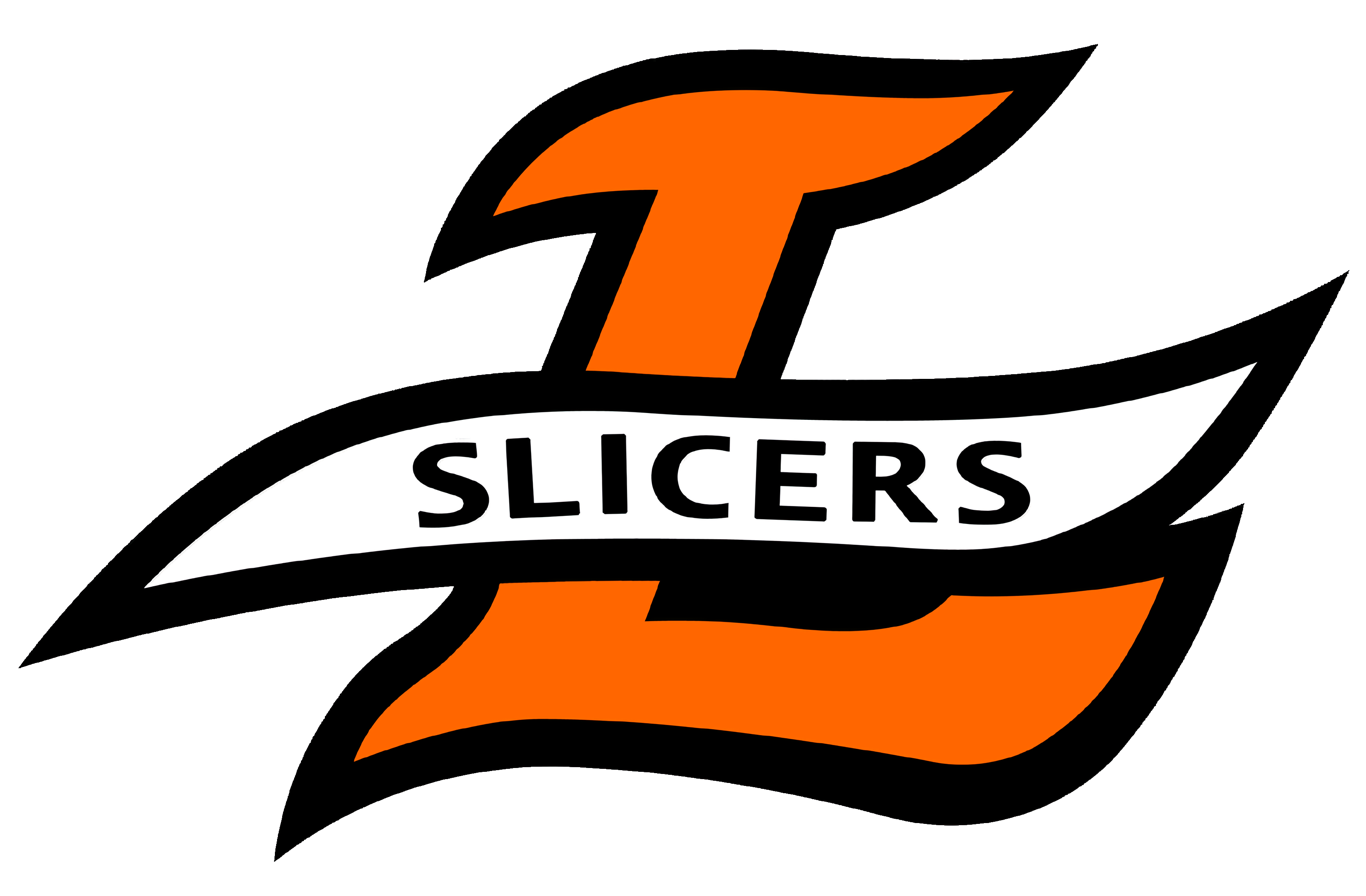

Location
- 602 F Street; LaPorte, LaPorte County, Indiana 46350; United States
- Coordinates: 41.601416°N 86.726679°W

Information
- Type: Public high school
- Motto: Once a Slicer, Always a Slicer
- Established: 1869 c.
- School district: LaPorte Community School Corporation
- Superintendent: Sandra Wood
- Principal: Scott Upp
- Teaching staff: 109.83 (FTE)
- Grades: PK, 9-12
- Enrollment: 1,807 (2024-2025)
- Student to teacher ratio: 16.45
- Colors: orange, black
- Athletics conference: Duneland Athletic Conference
- Team name: Slicers
- Rivals: Michigan City High School
- Newspaper: Slicer Newsroom
- Website: Official Website

LaPorte High School is a public high school located in LaPorte, Indiana. It is a part of the LaPorte Community School Corporation.

The school district (of which this is the sole comprehensive high school) includes most of LaPorte, as well as Kingsbury and Kingsford Heights.

== Notable alumni ==
- Dorothy Claire (American Singer)
- Miles Taylor (Security Expert)
- Ashley Hinshaw (American Actress)
- Isamu Noguchi (American Artist and Landscape Architect)
- Ron Reed (Major League Pitcher)

== See also ==
- List of high schools in Indiana
