= Yellow River (Indiana) =

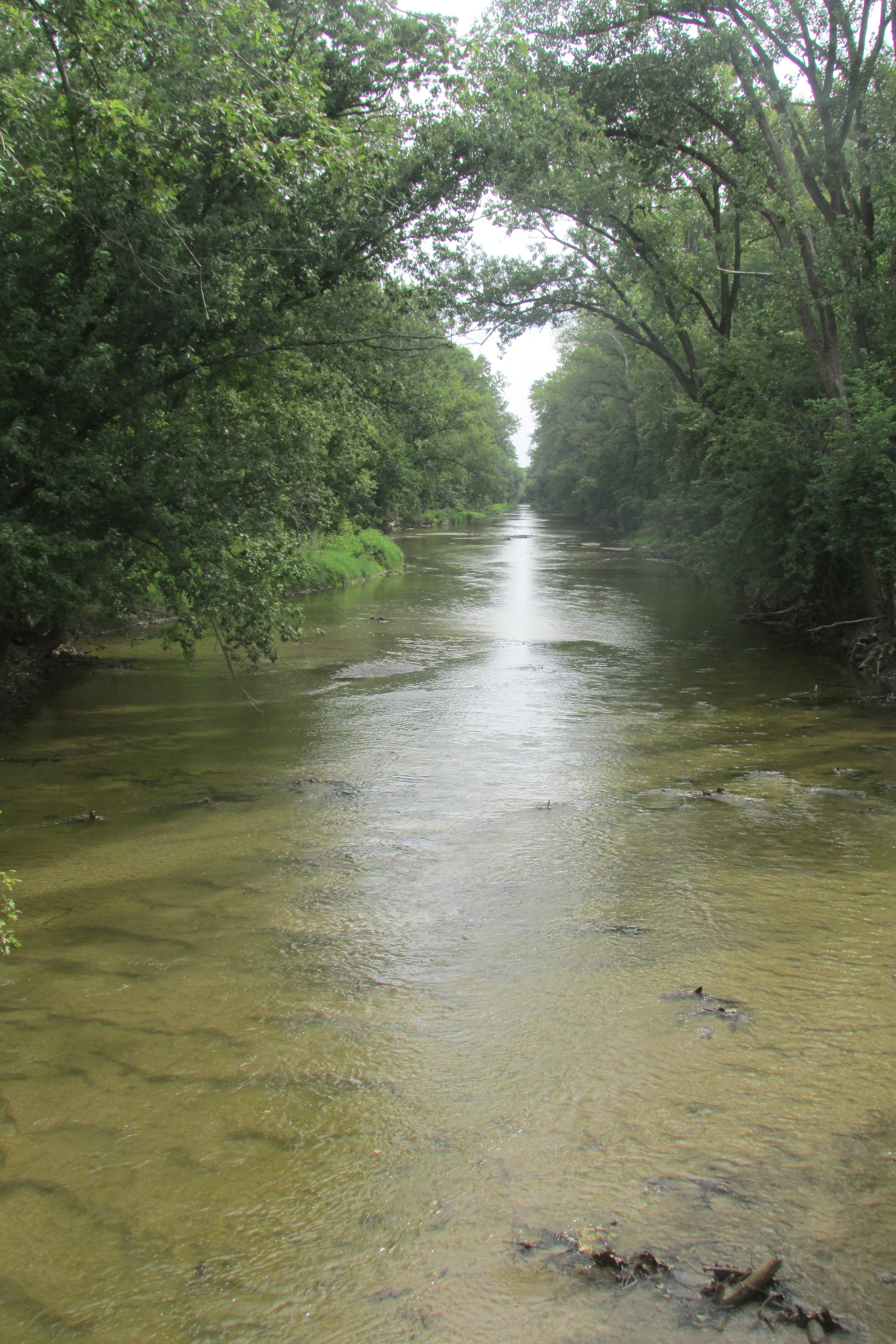
- The Yellow River got its name from the sandy bottom.

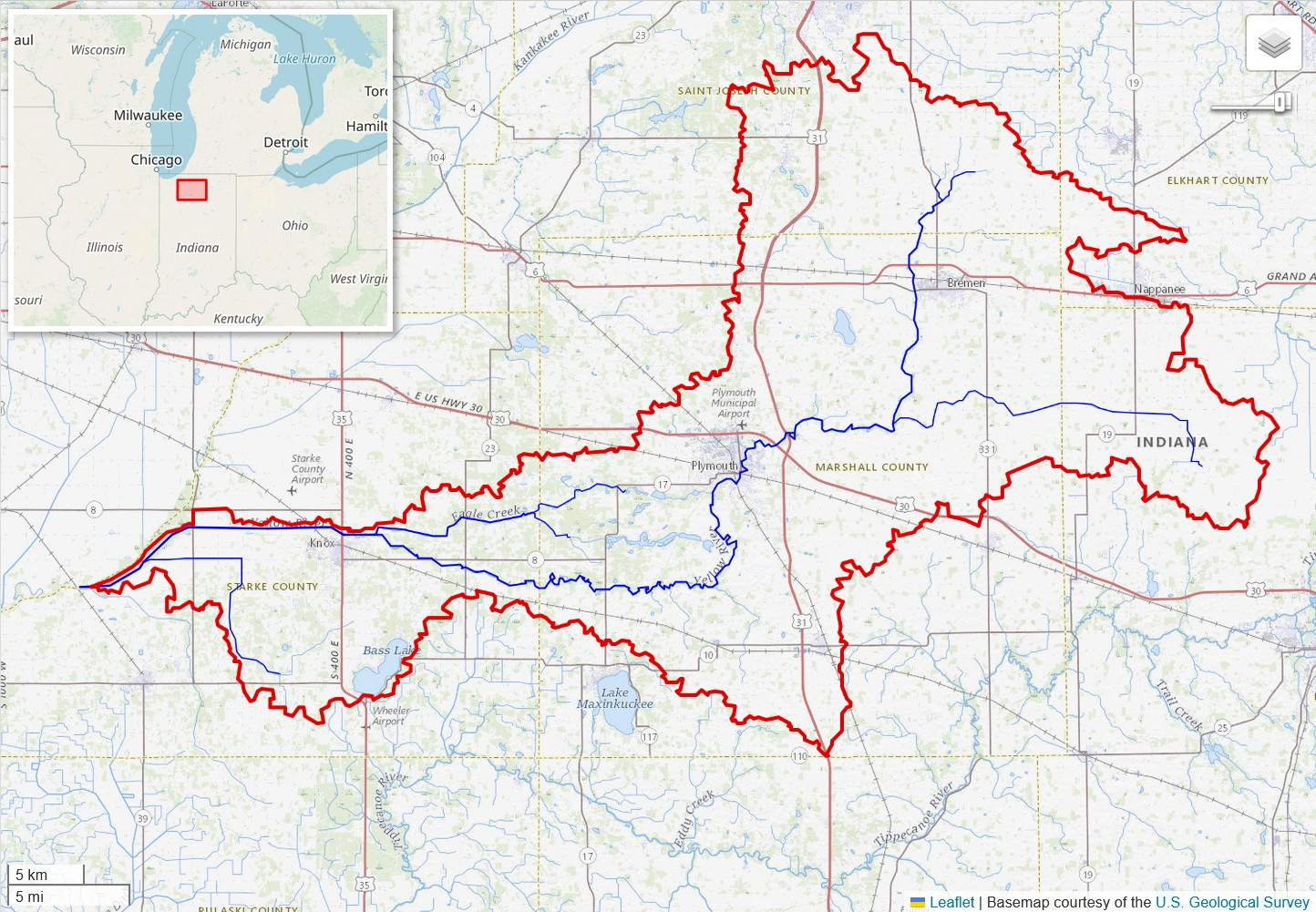
- Yellow River watershed (Interactive map)

Location
- Country: United States
- State: Indiana

Physical characteristics
- Source
  - location: St. Joseph County
  - coordinates: 41°29′54″N 86°09′08″W
  - elevation: 804 ft (245 m)
- Mouth: Kankakee River
  - location: Starke County
  - coordinates: 41°16′16″N 86°49′35″W
  - elevation: 656 ft (200 m)
- Length: 62 mi (100 km)approx.
- Basin size: 427 sq mi (1,110 km^{2})
- Discharge
  - location: mouth
  - average: 493.35 cu ft/s (13.970 m^{3}/s) (estimate)

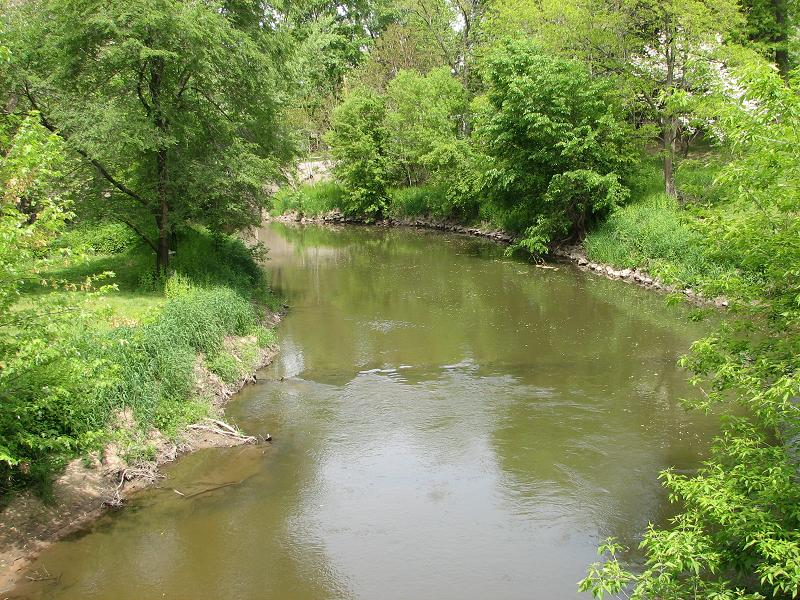
The Yellow River in Plymouth in 2006

The Yellow River is a 62.3-mile-long (100.3 km) tributary of the Kankakee River in the Central Corn Belt Plains ecoregion, located in northern Indiana in the United States. Via the Kankakee and Illinois rivers, it is part of the watershed of the Mississippi River, draining an area of 427 square miles (1,110 km^{2}).

The river's name is recorded in the Miami-Illinois language as oonsasiipi ("yellow river") and oonsaalamoonakami(i)ki ("it is yellow ocher water"), and in Potawatomi as wezawgəməg ("at the yellow water"), reflecting the river's original yellowish-brown muddy color.

== Course ==
Significant portions of the Yellow River's course have been straightened and channelized; the river's present-day course is considered to begin at a confluence of agricultural ditches in southeastern St. Joseph County, approximately 4 miles (6 km) north of the town of Bremen. The river initially flows southwardly into Marshall County, past Bremen; then generally southwestwardly, returning to its naturally winding riverbed and flowing through the city of Plymouth; and westwardly in a substantially straightened course through Starke County, past the city of Knox. It flows into the Kankakee River in southwestern Starke County, approximately 10 miles (16 km) west of Knox near the town of English Lake.

== Watershed ==
The Yellow River is bounded by the St. Joseph River of Lake Michigan on the north, flowing through Elkhart, Mishawaka, and South Bend. To the east is the Elkhart River, a branch of the St. Joseph, all flowing to Lake Michigan, through the lower lakes to the St. Lawrence River and reaching the North Atlantic. On the south and the southeast, it is bounded by the drainage of the Tippecanoe River. The Tippecanoe River flows southward into the Wabash River, emptying into the Ohio, then into the Mississippi River, expelling its waters into the Gulf of Mexico. To the southwest is the Iroquois River a tributary of the Kankakee River, as is the Yellow River. The Yellow River is the second-largest tributary of the Kankakee. The Iroquois River is larger and joins the Kankakee across the border in Illinois. The Kankakee River joins the Des Plaines River south of Joliet, Illinois, forming the Illinois River. Together they flow the length of the state of Illinois before joining the Mississippi River, north of St. Louis.

== History ==
=== Potawatomi ===
Main Poc was a warrior and chief among the Yellow River Potawatomi first coming to notice at the Treaty of Greenville (July 1795), which was to bring peace to the frontier. Within a year, Main Poc was leading raiding parties across the Mississippi into Spanish Territory. By 1804, Main Poc and Turkey Foot were raiding throughout the Midwest and deep into Tennessee and Kentucky. When they reached across the Mississippi to attack the Osage in what had become the U.S.'s Louisiana Territory, the American military called for a council. Main Poc and Turkey Foot did not attend and kept traveling out of their Yellow River communities to raid other Indian villages. Soon other Potawatomi villages were taking after Main Poc and raiding elsewhere. In 1807, Tecumseh and his brother, the prophet came to Indiana and Main Poc joined in his plans to hold back the white settlers. With Main Poc's move to Prophetstown in 1809, the Yellow River was no longer the seat of war among the Potawatomis. After the defeat of Tecumseh at the Battle of Tippecanoe and then at the Battle of the Thames (October 5, 1813), peace returned to northern Indiana. Main Poc returned to the Yellow River after the 1814 Treaty of Greenville. His new village was between Plymouth and Knox. In 1816 he died, leaving the pro-American Chiefs firmly in place.

By 1814, Menominee was a prominent leader of the Twin Lakes Potawatomi. He had become known to the Indian Agents as early as 1791 as a leader among the Twin Lakes Potawatomi. In 1820 he got Isaac McCoy, a Protestant Missionary to come to the Yellow River. Menominee was a religious chief and he planned to combine the teaching of Tecumseh and the Prophet with Roman Catholicism. He was seeking a way for his people to cope with the growing number of settlers. The Carey Mission was established on the St. Joseph River, north of the Twin Lakes in the area where Niles, Michigan now stands. In the 1830s, Carey's mission declined and was replaced by a Roman Catholic Mission. In 1833, the fathers expanded their mission to the Yellow River Potawatomi. These two communities would be the heart of the resistance to removal.

By 1830, there were three substantial Potawatomi villages on the Yellow River, each with its own chief. Notawkah (Rattlesnake) was the leader of the village east of the Yellow River, south of Plymouth. He moved to Kansas when chief Menominee refused to leave Indiana in 1837. Mackahtahmoah (Black Wolf) was chief of the western village, near the Starke and Marshall county lines. Pepinawah was another chief among these villages.

In 1832, during the Indian removal period, a group of Potawatomi chiefs signed a treaty with the U.S. government setting aside for the Potawatomi in perpetuity an area of 14,000 acres (57 km^{2}) in the vicinity of the Yellow River; this land was sold at the 1836 Treaty of Yellow River, signed by three Potawatomi chiefs, which stipulated that all Potawatomi move west of the Mississippi River within two years.

Chief Menominee refused to sign any treaty, which gave away Indian lands. Still, the land was taken by the Treaty of Tippecanoe. When the Potawatomi of Indiana were being rounded up for transportation to the west, Menominee's village became the gathering place of those who did not agree to go. When Menominee again refused to allow his village to be removed by August 6, 1838, the reservation was opened to squatters. When the Potawatomi destroyed the huts of squatters, the whites retaliated by burning the Indians cabins. In an attempt to prevent bloodshed, Governor David Wallace of Indiana authorized the enlistment of volunteers. Menominee was lured to a meeting to allow for the militia to surround his village and take the Potawatomi into custody. On September 4, 1838, the Potawatomi of Indiana began their march to Kansas, the Trail of Death. Menominee's band of 859 people were forcibly removed to Kansas in 1838, in an event known as the Potawatomi Trail of Death.

=== River engineering ===
At the time of European settlement, the area of the confluence of the Yellow and Kankakee Rivers was a densely vegetated marsh, seven miles (11 km) long, known as English Lake. The lower Yellow River was confined to a straightened channel and the wetland was drained and converted to farmland by the 1910s. A spit of land between the straightened Yellow and Kankakee channels was established by the state of Indiana as the Kankakee State Fish and Wildlife Area in 1933 and converted back to marshland.

The straightened section of the Yellow River in Starke County, which had historically been a swampy and winding stream with numerous oxbow lakes, was the subject of a 2004 effort by the United States Army Corps of Engineers to address excess accumulation of sediment in the river's streambed as a result of channelization.

== Towns and cities ==
- Bremen
- English Lake
- Knox
- Plymouth

== See also ==
- East Laporte Street Footbridge
- Kankakee River
- List of rivers in Indiana
