= LaSalle Fish and Wildlife Area =

Protected area in Indiana

- IUCN category IV (habitat/species management area)
- Location within Indiana
- Location: Lake and Newton counties, Indiana, United States
- Nearest city: Lake Village, IN
- Coordinates: 41°09′30″N 87°29′38″W
- Area: 3,797 acres (15.4 km^{2})
- Established: 1952
- Governing body: Indiana Department of Natural Resources
- Website: www.in.gov/dnr/fishwild/3088.htm

LaSalle Fish and Wildlife Area is a protected area that covers 3,797 acres (1,537 ha) dedicated to providing hunting and fishing opportunities. It is located south on County Road 650W, near Lake Village, Indiana on the Kankakee River.

== Wildlife ==
During the spring migration (March), waterfowl are at their peak abundance. Hunting is permitted during the appropriate seasons.

== Facilities ==
- Wildlife Viewing
- Picnicking
- Ice Fishing
- Hunting
- Trapping
- Dog Training Area
- Boat Ramp
