= Kingsbury Fish and Wildlife Area =

Wildlife Preserve

- IUCN category IV (habitat/species management area)
- Location within Indiana
- Location: LaPorte County, Indiana, United States
- Nearest city: Kingsbury, IN
- Coordinates: 41°29′51″N 86°34′05″W
- Area: 7,120 acres (28.8 km^{2})
- Established: 1965
- Governing body: Indiana Department of Natural Resources
- Website: www.in.gov/dnr/fishwild/3089.htm

Kingsbury Fish and Wildlife Area is a protected area that covers 7,120 acres (2,880 ha) of grasslands, wetlands, and crop fields dedicated to providing hunting and fishing opportunities. It is located south on County Road 650W, near Kingsbury, Indiana.

== History ==
Kingsbury was formerly the Kingsbury Arsenal of the U.S. Army. After the base closed in the 1960s, the land was transferred to the State of Indiana for wildlife preservation.

== Facilities ==
- Wildlife Viewing
- Picnicking
- Ice Fishing
- Hunting
- Trapping
- Shooting Range
- Archery Range
- Dog Training Area
- Boat Ramp (Electric trolling motors only)
