= Washington Township, LaPorte County, Indiana =

Washington Township
- Township
- Coordinates: 41°31′14″N 86°38′55″W
- Country: United States
- State: Indiana
- County: LaPorte

Government
  - Type: Indiana township

Area
  - Total: 26.84 sq mi (69.5 km^{2})
  - Land: 26.83 sq mi (69.5 km^{2})
  - Water: 0.01 sq mi (0.026 km^{2})
- Elevation: 738 ft (225 m)

Population (2020)
  - Total: 1,211
  - Density: 50.6/sq mi (19.5/km^{2})
- FIPS code: 18-80774
- GNIS feature ID: 454004

Washington Township is one of twenty-one townships in LaPorte County, Indiana. As of the 2020 census, its population was 1,211 (down from 1,357 at 2010) and it contained 491 housing units.

== Geography ==
According to the 2010 census, the township has a total area of 26.84 square miles (69.5 km^{2}), of which 26.83 square miles (69.5 km^{2}) (or 99.96%) is land and 0.01 square miles (0.026 km^{2}) (or 0.04%) is water.
