= Jasper-Pulaski Fish and Wildlife Area =

Hunting and fishing wildlife area in Indiana

- Interactive map of Jasper-Pulaski Fish and Wildlife Area
- Type: Fish and Wildlife Area
- Location: Jasper, Pulaski and Starke Counties, Indiana, USA
- Nearest city: Medaryville, Indiana
- Coordinates: 41°8.707′N 86°54.543′W
- Area: 8,062 acres (3,262.6 ha)
- Operator: Indiana DNR
- Other information: Facilities: Hunting; Trapping; Fishing; Ice Fishing; Shooting Range; Archery Range; Dog Training Area; Sandhill Crane Viewing Area

Jasper-Pulaski Fish and Wildlife Area is a hunting and fishing wildlife area administered by the Indiana Department of Natural Resources' Division of Fish & Wildlife. The Division of Fish & Wildlife is dedicated to providing a quality hunting and fishing area while maintaining 8,179 acres of wetland, upland and woodland game habitat.

The property's suitable habitat also provides an ideal stopover for migratory birds, such as the more than 30,000 sandhill cranes that stop during fall migration.

The area was established by the State of Indiana in 1930 to help address the loss of wildlife habitat caused by the drainage of the Grand Kankakee Marsh. By 1932, it produced 6,000 pheasants and 700 quail. During the Great Depression, the Works Progress Administration and the Civilian Conservation Corps expanded the area's wetland preserves to restore bird habitats.

The office headquarters is located Medaryville, in northwestern Indiana. The property itself spans three counties. The majority of the land is in both northwestern Pulaski County and northeastern Jasper County, with a small area of land jutting into southwestern Starke County. The property is split by time zone lines both north–south and east–west at the county lines as Jasper County and Starke County utilize Central Time whereas Pulaski County utilizes Eastern Time. Approximately 55% of the property is in the Central Time Zone and the other 45% is in the Eastern Time Zone.

The Jasper-Pulaski Shooting Range is at 4106 E. 850 N. Wheatfield, IN. Anarchery range is located on County Road 1650 W in Medaryville, just north of the Sandhill Crane Observation Area. The shooting range and the archery range are both open to the public, each with no fees and each with their own check-in areas.

In addition to state fish and wildlife laws, this property is governed by posted regulations affecting the public use of lands and facilities owned, leased or licensed by the Department of Natural Resources. Parking is available throughout the property with signage designating appropriate parking throughout the property.

== Gallery ==
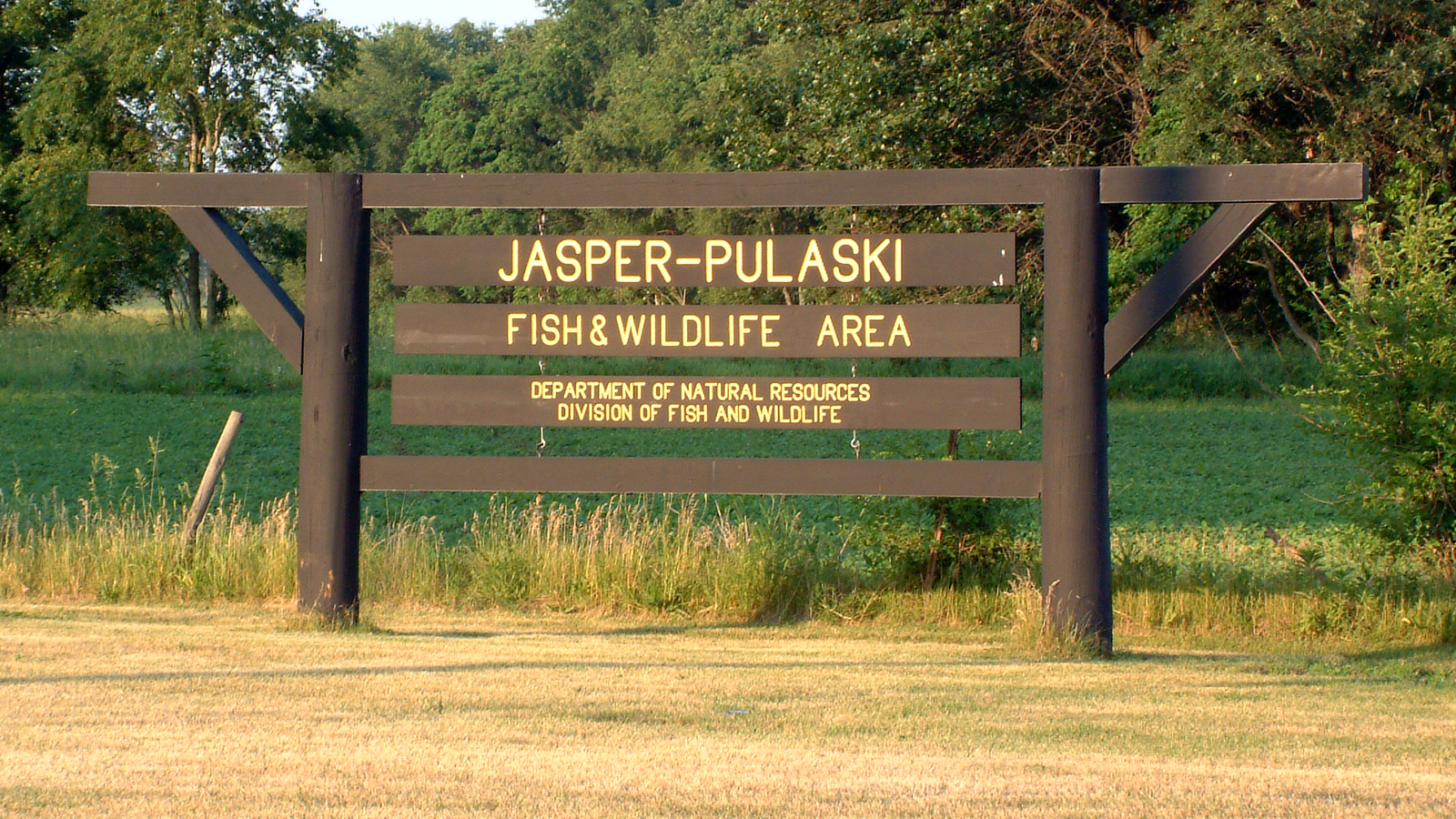
These large wooden signs at SR 143 & US Hwy 421 were taken down in the spring of 2020.

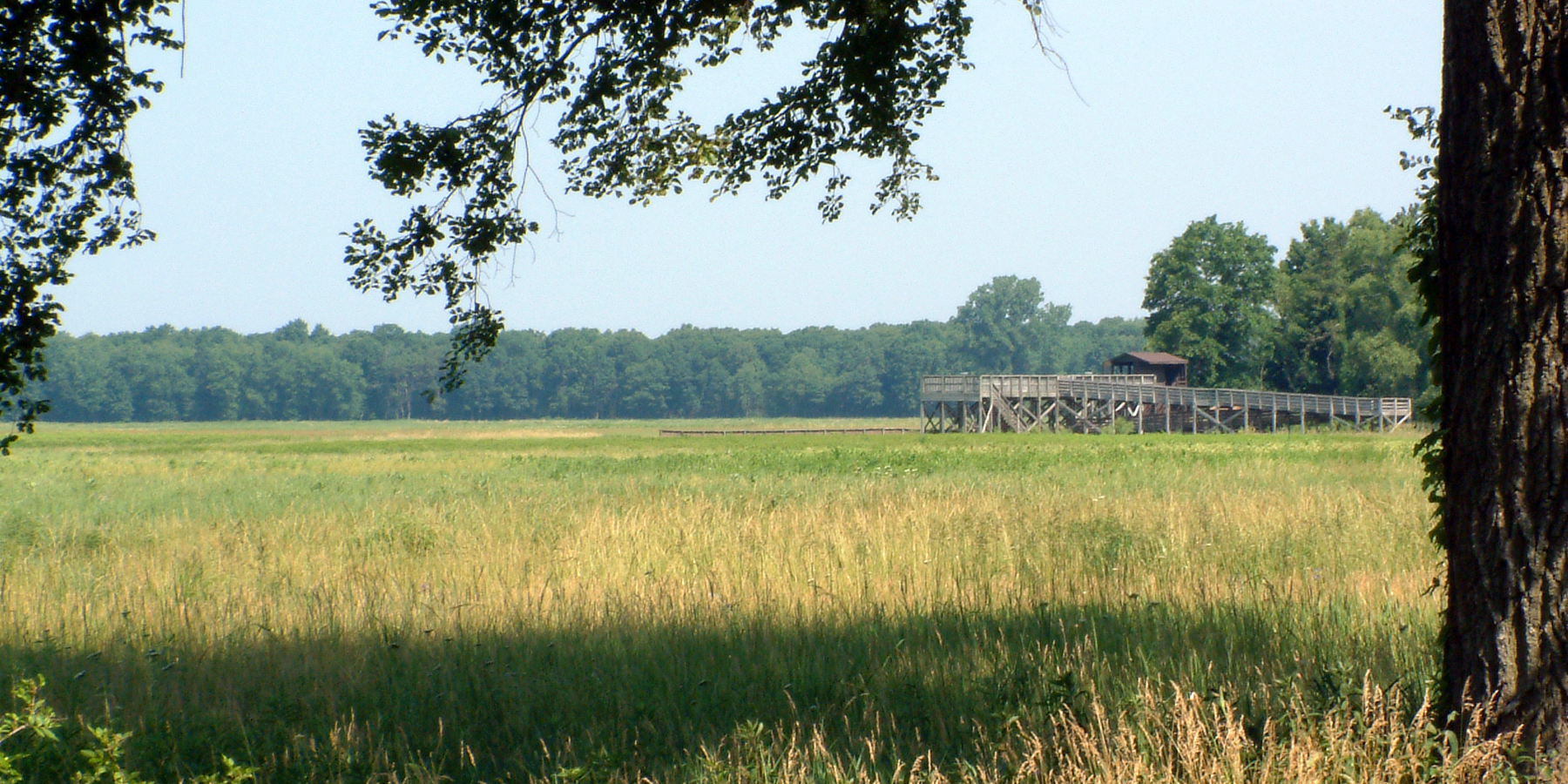
Looking toward the Sandhill Crane observation platform.

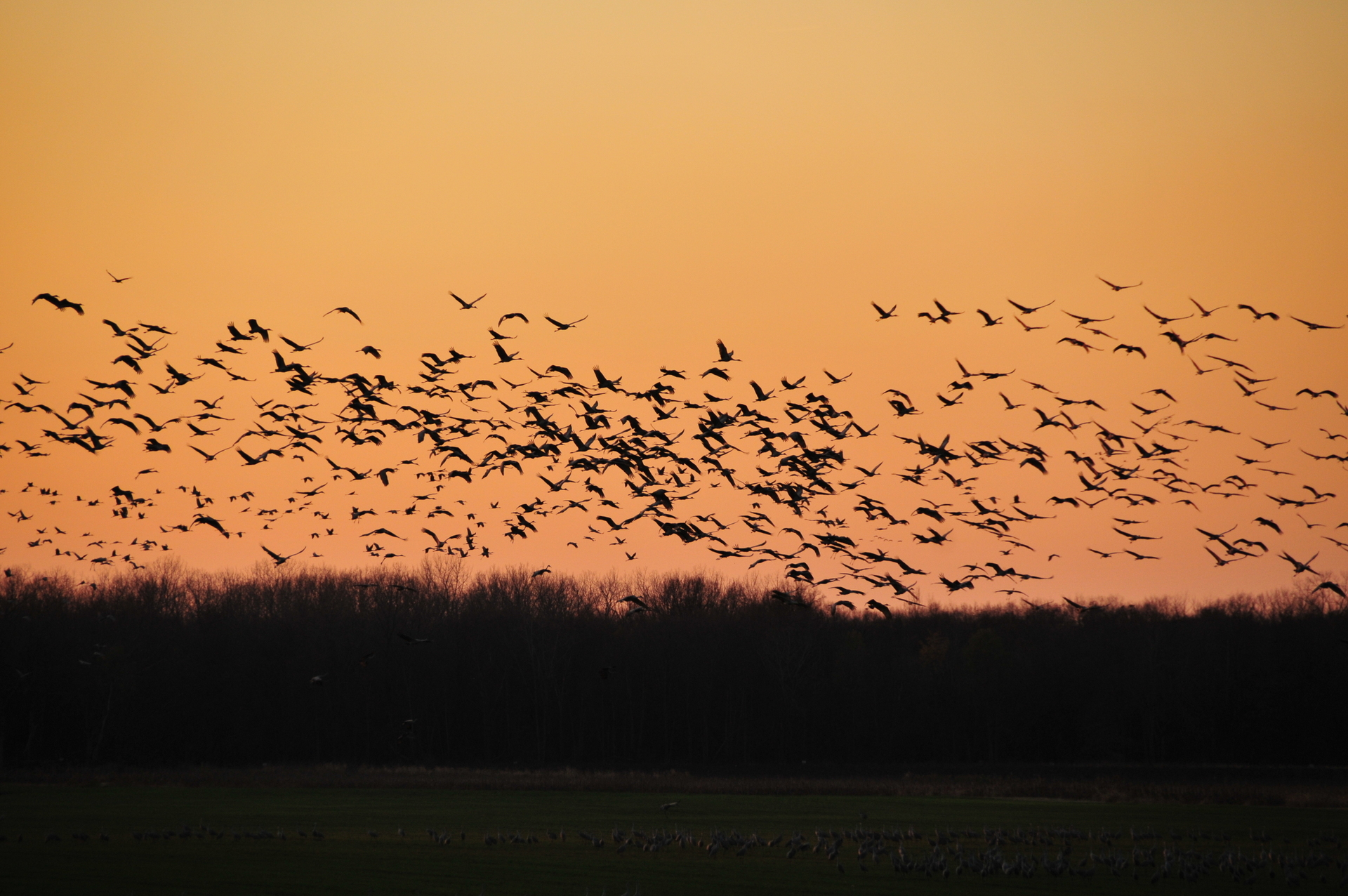

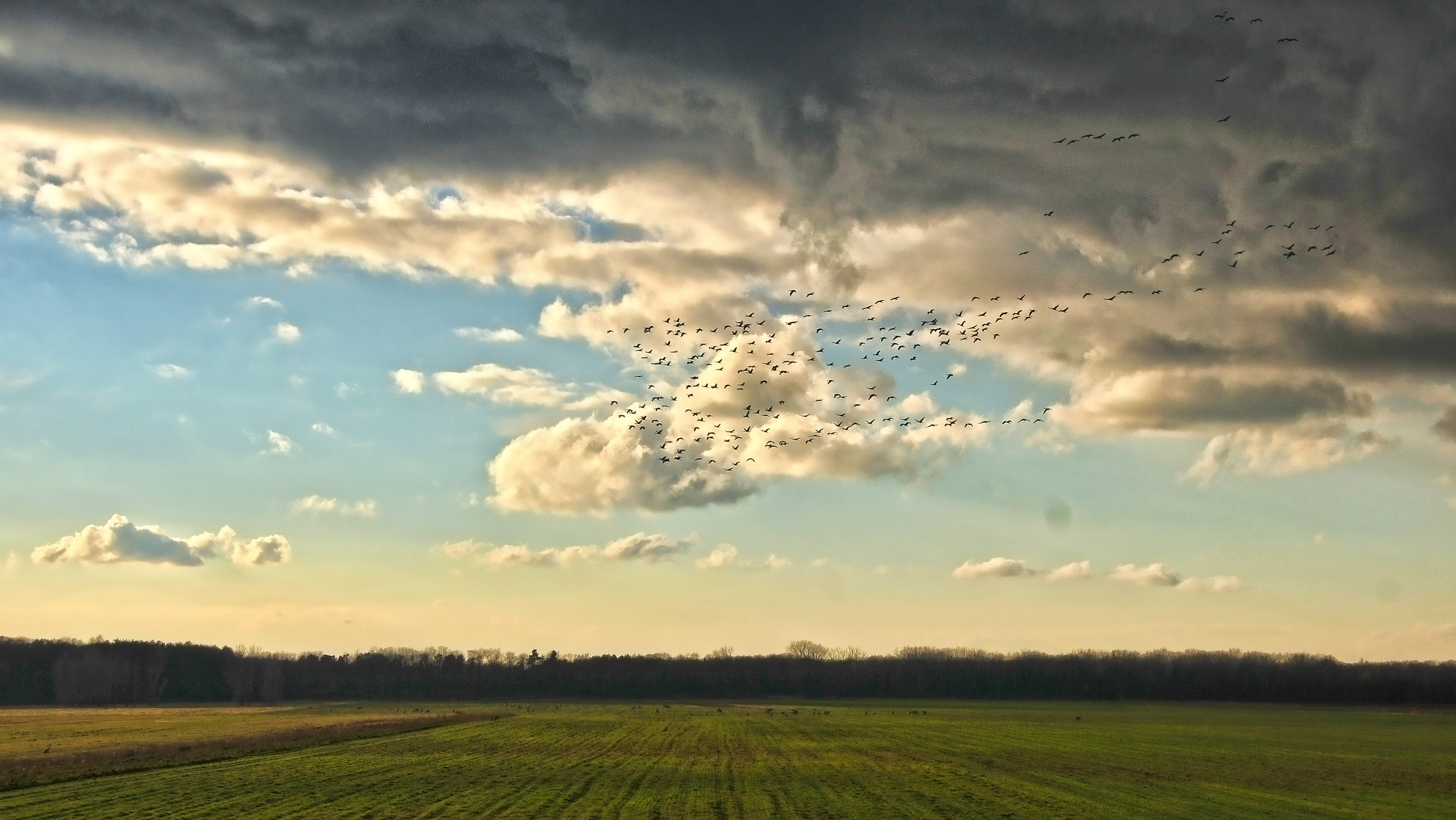

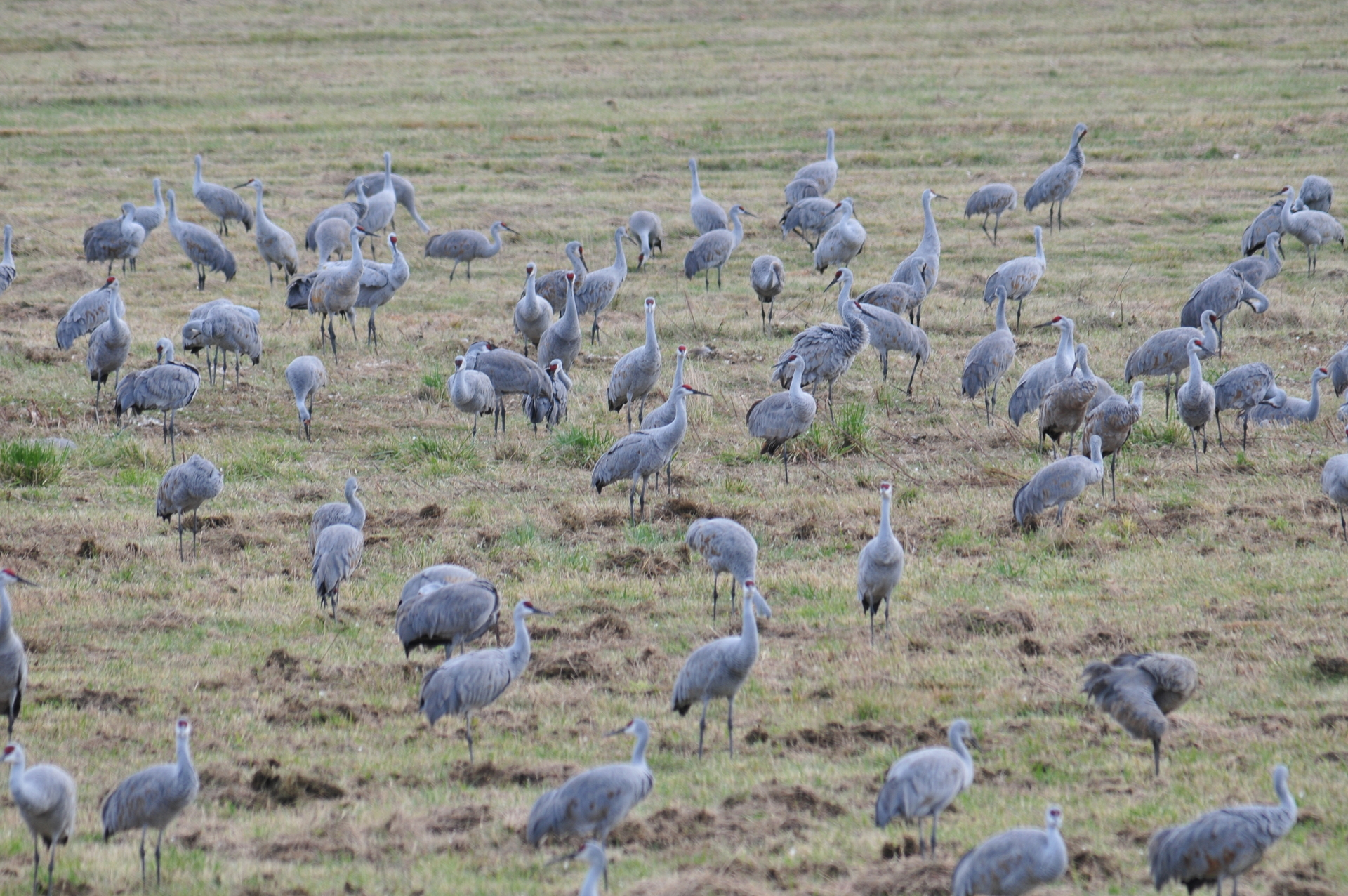

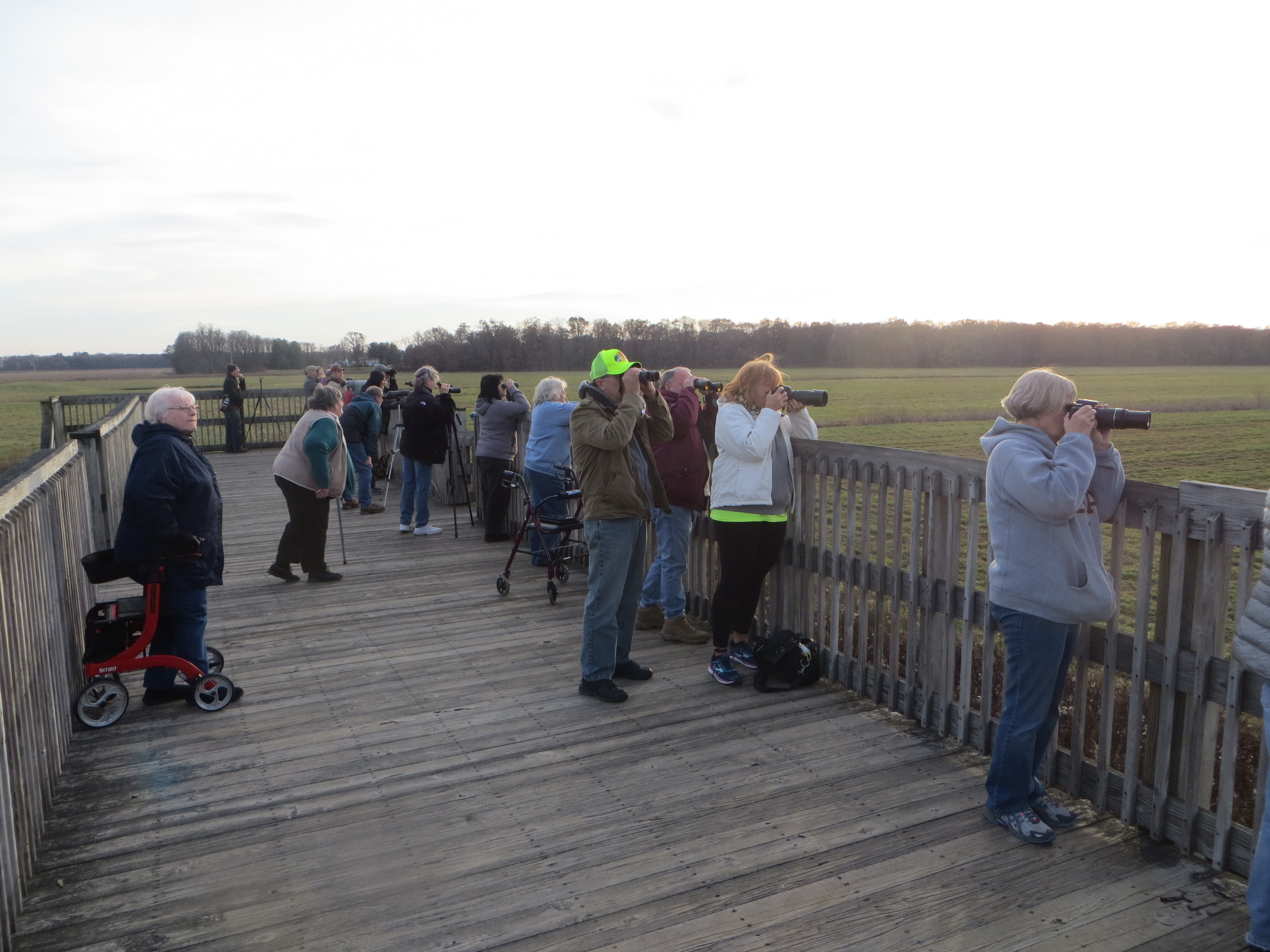
Birdwatchers on the crane observation platform
