= 1888 United States presidential election in Indiana =

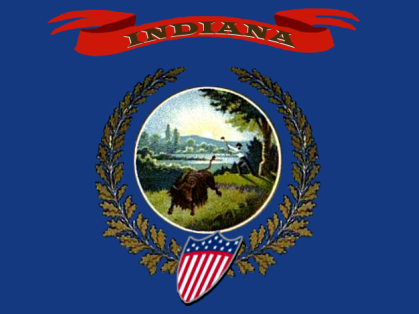
- November 6, 1888
- Turnout: 93.3% ▲1.1 pp
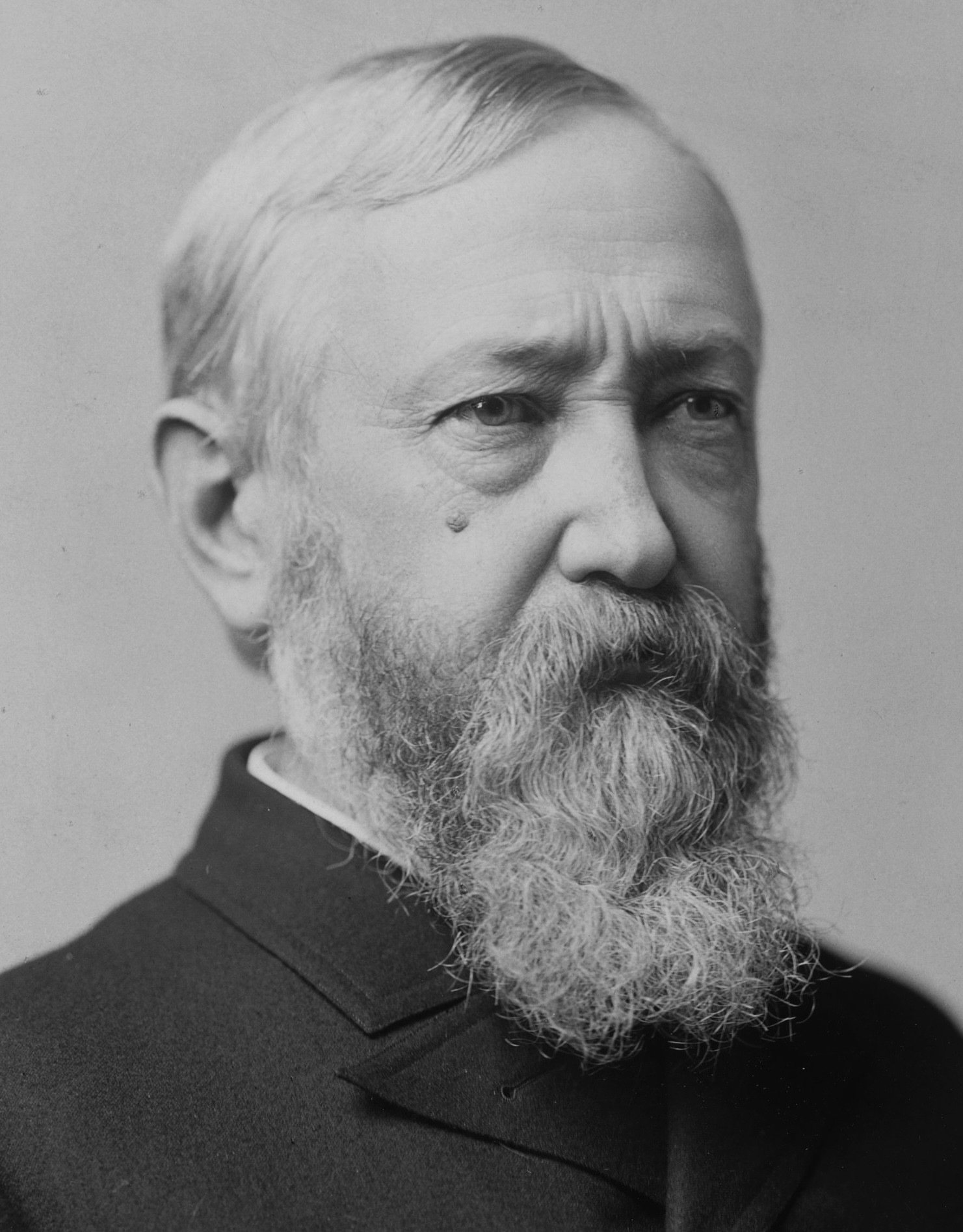

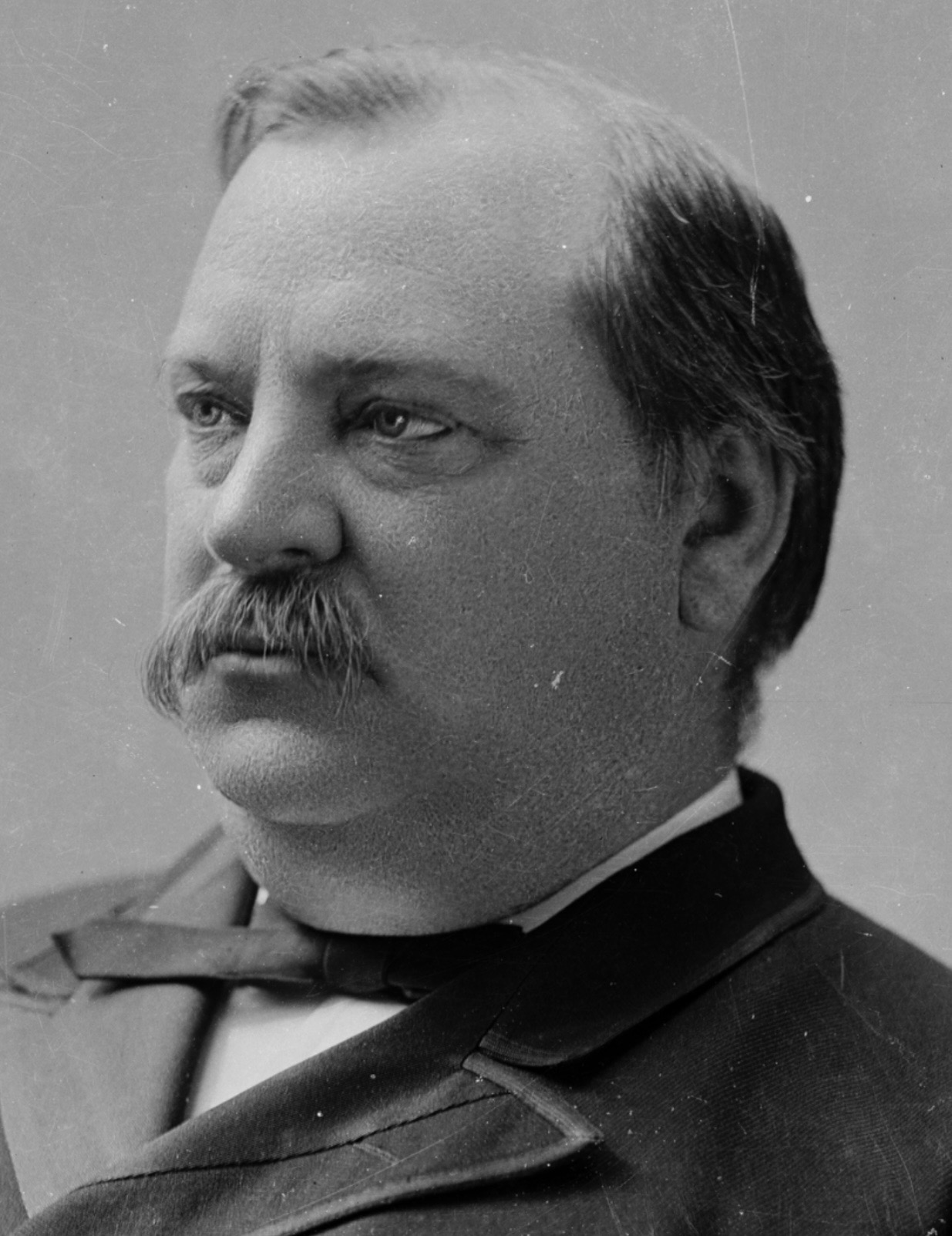
Nominee	Benjamin Harrison	Grover Cleveland
Party	Republican	Democratic
Home state	Indiana	New York
Running mate	Levi P. Morton	Allen G. Thurman
Electoral vote	15	0
Popular vote	263,361	261,009
Percentage	49.04%	48.60%
County results
Harrison
40–50%
50–60%
60–70%
Cleveland
40–50%
50–60%
60–70%
70–80%
President before election
Grover Cleveland
Democratic
Elected President
Benjamin Harrison
Republican

A presidential election was held in Indiana on November 6, 1888, as part of the 1888 United States presidential election. The Republican ticket of Indiana's own junior U.S. senator Benjamin Harrison and the former U.S. ambassador to France Levi P. Morton defeated the Democratic ticket of the incumbent president Grover Cleveland and the former U.S. senator from Ohio Allen G. Thurman. Harrison defeated Cleveland in the national election with 233 electoral votes.

This was the last presidential election held in Indiana using the party ticket system. Following this election, allegations of widespread fraud and abuse associated with the use of tickets printed and distributed by the parties led to the adoption of the Australian ballot for future contests.

== General election ==
=== Summary ===
Indiana chose 15 electors in a statewide general election. Nineteenth-century presidential elections used a form of block voting that allowed voters to modify the electoral list nominated by a political party before submitting their ballots. Because voters elected each member of the Electoral College individually, electors nominated by the same party often received differing numbers of votes as a consequence of voter rolloff, split-ticket voting, or electoral fusion. This table reflects the statewide popular vote as calculated by Walter Dean Burnham in his influential study, Presidential Ballots, 1836–1892, as corrected by the secretary of state of Indiana. Svend Petersen finds four more votes for Cleveland in Indiana.

1888 United States presidential election in Indiana (Note: Burnham finds 9,877 votes for Fisk and 2,757 votes for Streeter in Indiana; however, revised figures published by the secretary of state indicate 9,945 votes for the leading Prohibition elector, Jesse T. Hutchens, and 2,693 votes for the leading Union Labor elector, Jason H. Allen. The total number of third party votes calculated by Burnham (12,638) equals the sum of the totals for the Prohibition and Union Labor electors in the corrected official returns.)
Party	Candidate	Votes	%	±%
Republican	Benjamin Harrison Levi P. Morton	263,361	49.04	▲0.90
Democratic	Grover Cleveland Allen G. Thurman	261,009	48.60	▼0.86
Prohibition	Clinton B. Fisk John A. Brooks	9,945	1.85	▲0.06
Union Labor	Alson Streeter Charles E. Cunningham	2,693	0.50	▲0.50
Total votes		537,008	100.00	

=== Results ===
1888 United States presidential election in Indiana
Party	Electors for Candidate	Votes
Republican	Thomas H. Nelson	263,361
Republican	James M. Shackelford	263,356
Republican	Thomas J. Brooks	263,340
Republican	Cicero Buchanan	263,340
Republican	John O. Cravens	263,340
Republican	David E. Beem	263,338
Republican	John C. Chaney	263,337
Republican	Winfield T. Durbin	263,336
Republican	Leander P. Mitchell	263,335
Republican	David W. Voyles	263,334
Republican	David C. Suell	263,332
Republican	William L. Penfield	263,325
Republican	William H. Trammel	263,325
Republican	Frank Swigart	263,321
Republican	Hiram S. Biggs	263,316
Democratic	Samuel B. Vance	261,009 (Note: Corrected from first printing.)
Democratic	Cutler S. Dobbins	261,008
Democratic	John N. Turner	261,004
Democratic	Andrew G. Wood	261,004
Democratic	Nicholas Cornet	260,995
Democratic	John F. McHugh	260,991
Democratic	Thomas J. Study	260,989
Democratic	David D. Dykeman	260,988
Democratic	George H. D. Gibson	260,987
Democratic	John H. Bass	260,983
Democratic	John R. East	260,983
Democratic	David S. Gooding	260,978
Democratic	Samuel D. Puett	260,974
Democratic	Thomas R. Cobb	260,969
Democratic	John E. Lamb	260,882
Prohibition	Jesse T. Hutchens	9,945
Prohibition	Augustus Bradley	9,941
Prohibition	John Brazelton	9,941
Prohibition	Milton Hayward	9,941
Prohibition	Rena M. Julian	9,941
Prohibition	Felix McWhirter	9,941
Prohibition	Charles L. Murray	9,941
Prohibition	William M. Ross	9,941
Prohibition	James T. Williams	9,940
Prohibition	George W. Terry	9,940
Prohibition	Daniel W. Thomas	9,940
Prohibition	Calvin J. Winch	9,940
Prohibition	Henry W. Bullock	9,939
Prohibition	Leander M. Crist	9,938
Prohibition	Leroy H. Albert	9,823
Union Labor	Hugh Marlin	2,694
Union Labor	Jason H. Allen	2,693
Union Labor	James D. Hudson	2,693
Union Labor	Charlton Bull	2,692
Union Labor	Wesley Glover	2,691
Union Labor	Albert A. Bender	2,684
Union Labor	Edward Sanford	2,684
Union Labor	Claborn J. Smoot	2,670
Union Labor	John S. Bender	2,668
Union Labor	R. H. Davis	2,604
Union Labor	Moses Smith	2,585
Union Labor	Abram Williams	2,536
Union Labor	Adam C. Ford	2,605
Union Labor	William Austell	2,346
Total		≈537,008

=== Results by county ===
1888 United States presidential election in Indiana by county
County	Benjamin Harrison Republican		Grover Cleveland Democratic		Clinton B. Fisk Prohibition		Alson Streeter Union Labor		Margin		Total
County	Votes	Percent	Votes	Percent	Votes	Percent	Votes	Percent	Votes	Percent	Total
Adams	1,277	29.27%	2,936	67.29%	141	3.23%	9	0.21%	-1,659	-38.02%	4,363
Allen	5,455	35.41%	9,692	62.92%	162	1.05%	95	0.62%	-4,237	-27.51%	15,404
Bartholomew	2,742	46.27%	3,109	52.46%	69	1.16%	6	0.10%	-367	-6.19%	5,926
Benton	1,626	52.18%	1,425	45.73%	62	1.99%	3	0.10%	201	6.45%	3,116
Blackford	1,141	46.57%	1,232	50.29%	59	2.41%	18	0.73%	-91	-3.71%	2,450
Boone	3,441	48.95%	3,324	47.29%	104	1.48%	160	2.28%	117	1.66%	7,029
Brown	661	29.08%	1,538	67.66%	63	2.77%	11	0.48%	-877	-38.58%	2,273
Carroll	2,607	48.96%	2,560	48.08%	130	2.44%	28	0.53%	47	0.88%	5,325
Cass	3,822	46.34%	4,221	51.18%	162	1.96%	43	0.52%	-399	-4.84%	8,248
Clark	3,206	45.52%	3,788	53.78%	46	0.65%	3	0.04%	-582	-8.26%	7,043
Clay	3,711	48.12%	3,773	48.92%	130	1.69%	98	1.27%	-62	-0.80%	7,712
Clinton	3,519	50.50%	3,278	47.04%	137	1.97%	34	0.49%	241	3.46%	6,968
Crawford	1,445	46.54%	1,628	52.43%	22	0.71%	10	0.32%	-183	-5.89%	3,105
Daviess	2,691	49.60%	2,689	49.57%	6	0.11%	39	0.72%	2	0.04%	5,425
De Kalb	2,879	46.28%	3,160	50.80%	141	2.27%	41	0.66%	-281	-4.52%	6,221
Dearborn	2,648	42.25%	3,531	56.33%	57	0.91%	32	0.51%	-883	-14.09%	6,268
Decatur	2,663	51.86%	2,400	46.74%	67	1.30%	5	0.10%	263	5.12%	5,135
Delaware	4,227	62.23%	2,368	34.86%	181	2.66%	17	0.25%	1,859	27.37%	6,793
Dubois	1,220	28.88%	2,986	70.67%	17	0.40%	2	0.05%	-1,766	-41.80%	4,225
Elkhart	4,955	50.62%	4,464	45.61%	322	3.29%	47	0.48%	491	5.01%	9,788
Fayette	1,953	56.64%	1,471	42.66%	24	0.70%	0	0.00%	482	13.98%	3,448
Floyd	2,947	42.88%	3,824	55.65%	86	1.25%	15	0.22%	-877	-12.76%	6,872
Fountain	2,608	49.41%	2,525	47.84%	31	0.59%	114	2.16%	83	1.57%	5,278
Franklin	1,712	37.05%	2,872	62.15%	37	0.80%	0	0.00%	-1,160	-25.10%	4,621
Fulton	2,053	47.79%	2,163	50.35%	76	1.77%	4	0.09%	-110	-2.56%	4,296
Gibson	2,953	49.74%	2,721	45.83%	238	4.01%	25	0.42%	232	3.91%	5,937
Grant	3,929	53.87%	2,990	41.00%	373	5.11%	1	0.01%	939	12.88%	7,293
Greene	2,934	51.96%	2,659	47.09%	36	0.64%	18	0.32%	275	4.87%	5,647
Hamilton	3,599	56.04%	2,412	37.56%	390	6.07%	21	0.33%	1,187	18.48%	6,422
Hancock	1,986	44.68%	2,376	53.45%	75	1.69%	8	0.18%	-390	-8.77%	4,445
Harrison	2,133	44.76%	2,529	53.07%	26	0.55%	77	1.62%	-396	-8.31%	4,765
Hendricks	3,297	58.62%	2,083	37.04%	241	4.29%	3	0.05%	1,214	21.59%	5,624
Henry	3,849	60.07%	2,277	35.54%	230	3.59%	51	0.80%	1,572	24.52%	6,407
Howard	3,604	58.87%	2,202	35.97%	227	3.71%	89	1.45%	1,402	22.90%	6,122
Huntington	3,559	49.23%	3,481	48.15%	186	2.57%	3	0.04%	78	1.08%	7,229
Jackson	2,263	40.89%	3,235	58.45%	19	0.34%	18	0.33%	-972	-17.56%	5,535
Jasper	1,604	59.30%	1,003	37.08%	78	2.88%	20	0.74%	601	22.22%	2,705
Jay	2,811	48.42%	2,741	47.22%	181	3.12%	72	1.24%	70	1.20%	5,805
Jefferson	3,321	54.87%	2,700	44.61%	31	0.51%	0	0.00%	621	10.26%	6,052
Jennings	2,057	55.55%	1,598	43.15%	25	0.68%	23	0.62%	459	12.40%	3,703
Johnson	2,168	43.45%	2,594	51.98%	66	1.32%	162	3.25%	-426	-8.54%	4,990
Knox	2,922	43.57%	3,621	53.99%	161	2.40%	3	0.04%	-699	-10.42%	6,707
Kosciusko	4,147	55.81%	3,081	41.46%	197	2.65%	6	0.08%	1,066	14.35%	7,431
La Porte	3,722	44.11%	4,607	54.60%	93	1.10%	16	0.19%	-885	-10.49%	8,438
Lagrange	2,262	57.32%	1,516	38.42%	133	3.37%	35	0.89%	746	18.91%	3,946
Lake	2,543	54.21%	2,068	44.08%	77	1.64%	3	0.06%	475	10.13%	4,691
Lawrence	2,256	55.24%	1,814	44.42%	9	0.22%	5	0.12%	442	10.82%	4,084
Madison	3,436	45.26%	3,928	51.74%	199	2.62%	29	0.38%	-492	-6.48%	7,592
Marion	17,139	48.82%	17,515	49.89%	399	1.14%	57	0.16%	-376	-1.07%	35,110
Marshall	2,582	43.70%	3,188	53.96%	101	1.71%	37	0.63%	-606	-10.26%	5,908
Martin	1,391	46.99%	1,558	52.64%	8	0.27%	3	0.10%	-167	-5.64%	2,960
Miami	3,042	45.30%	3,492	52.00%	145	2.16%	36	0.54%	-450	-6.70%	6,715
Monroe	2,054	51.50%	1,815	45.51%	84	2.11%	35	0.88%	239	5.99%	3,988
Montgomery	4,011	50.82%	3,763	47.68%	89	1.13%	29	0.37%	248	3.14%	7,892
Morgan	2,500	53.58%	2,077	44.51%	76	1.63%	13	0.28%	423	9.07%	4,666
Newton	1,283	57.66%	860	38.65%	68	3.06%	14	0.63%	423	19.01%	2,225
Noble	3,026	49.16%	2,979	48.39%	137	2.23%	14	0.23%	47	0.76%	6,156
Ohio	726	55.25%	585	44.52%	2	0.15%	1	0.08%	141	10.73%	1,314
Orange	1,779	51.67%	1,654	48.04%	10	0.29%	0	0.00%	125	3.63%	3,443
Owen	1,632	45.08%	1,918	52.98%	70	1.93%	0	0.00%	-286	-7.90%	3,620
Parke	2,764	53.28%	2,159	41.62%	178	3.43%	87	1.68%	605	11.66%	5,188
Perry	1,974	49.54%	2,007	50.36%	3	0.08%	1	0.03%	-33	-0.83%	3,985
Pike	2,197	50.02%	2,098	47.77%	19	0.43%	78	1.78%	99	2.25%	4,392
Porter	2,427	52.82%	2,018	43.92%	143	3.11%	7	0.15%	409	8.90%	4,595
Posey	2,369	45.70%	2,684	51.77%	99	1.91%	32	0.62%	-315	-6.08%	5,184
Pulaski	1,223	44.95%	1,446	53.14%	37	1.36%	15	0.55%	-223	-8.20%	2,721
Putnam	2,570	45.12%	3,016	52.95%	96	1.69%	14	0.25%	-446	-7.83%	5,696
Randolph	4,629	65.11%	2,256	31.73%	180	2.53%	45	0.63%	2,373	33.38%	7,110
Ripley	2,404	49.77%	2,381	49.30%	40	0.83%	5	0.10%	23	0.48%	4,830
Rush	2,713	52.46%	2,292	44.32%	146	2.82%	21	0.41%	421	8.14%	5,172
Scott	743	41.28%	1,030	57.22%	27	1.50%	0	0.00%	-287	-15.94%	1,800
Shelby	2,877	44.41%	3,409	52.62%	180	2.78%	12	0.19%	-532	-8.21%	6,478
Spencer	2,733	50.22%	2,685	49.34%	20	0.37%	4	0.07%	48	0.88%	5,442
St. Joseph	4,929	47.40%	5,257	50.56%	198	1.90%	14	0.13%	-328	-3.15%	10,398
Starke	834	47.23%	904	51.19%	26	1.47%	2	0.11%	-70	-3.96%	1,766
Steuben	2,352	61.12%	1,348	35.03%	118	3.07%	30	0.78%	1,004	26.09%	3,848
Sullivan	1,902	35.56%	3,382	63.24%	38	0.71%	26	0.49%	-1,480	-27.67%	5,348
Switzerland	1,560	47.87%	1,637	50.23%	5	0.15%	57	1.75%	-77	-2.36%	3,259
Tippecanoe	5,072	53.39%	4,281	45.06%	120	1.26%	27	0.28%	791	8.33%	9,500
Tipton	2,042	44.93%	2,370	52.14%	109	2.40%	24	0.53%	-328	-7.21%	4,545
Union	1,108	54.74%	868	42.89%	42	2.08%	6	0.30%	240	11.86%	2,024
Vanderburgh	6,027	50.23%	5,889	49.08%	65	0.54%	17	0.14%	138	1.15%	11,998
Vermillion	1,730	52.36%	1,438	43.52%	49	1.48%	87	2.63%	292	8.84%	3,304
Vigo	6,273	49.84%	6,102	48.48%	51	0.40%	160	1.27%	171	1.36%	12,586
Wabash	3,986	58.41%	2,555	37.44%	261	3.82%	22	0.32%	1,431	20.97%	6,824
Warren	1,847	63.32%	1,017	34.86%	38	1.30%	15	0.51%	830	28.45%	2,917
Warrick	2,361	47.05%	2,557	50.96%	62	1.24%	38	0.76%	-196	-3.91%	5,018
Washington	1,847	43.38%	2,389	56.12%	14	0.33%	8	0.19%	-542	-12.74%	4,258
Wayne	6,138	60.91%	3,653	36.25%	266	2.64%	20	0.20%	2,485	24.66%	10,077
Wells	1,926	37.17%	2,942	56.77%	286	5.52%	28	0.54%	-1,016	-19.61%	5,182
White	1,942	48.01%	2,017	49.86%	69	1.71%	17	0.42%	-75	-1.85%	4,045
Whitley	2,133	46.18%	2,325	50.34%	148	3.20%	13	0.28%	-192	-4.16%	4,619
Totals	263,361	49.04%	261,009	48.60%	9,945	1.85%	2,693	0.50%	2,352	0.44%	537,008

== See also ==
- United States presidential elections in Indiana

== Bibliography ==
- Burnham, Walter Dean (1955). Presidential Ballots, 1836–1892. Baltimore: Johns Hopkins Press.
- Griffin, Charles F. (1888). "Abstract of Vote Polled for Presidential Electors [...]". Biennial Report of Charles F. Griffin, Secretary of State of the State of Indiana [...]. Indianapolis.
- La Follette, Robert (June 1928). "The Adoption of the Australian Ballot in Indiana". Indiana Magazine of History. 24 (2): 105–20.
- Madison, James H. (1986). The Indiana Way: A State History. Bloomington: Indiana University Press.
- Petersen, Svend (1963). A Statistical History of the American Presidential Elections. New York: Frederick Ungar Publishing Company. LCCN 62-21786.
