= David Worth =

David Worth may refer to:

- David Worth (cinematographer) (1940–2026), American cinematographer and director
- David Worth Clark (1902–1955), US politician
- David W. Dennis (1912–1999), US politician
- David W. Bagley (1883–1960), US Navy admiral
- David Worth, a fictional character in the film Cube
