= Floyd Fithian =

American politician (1928–2003)

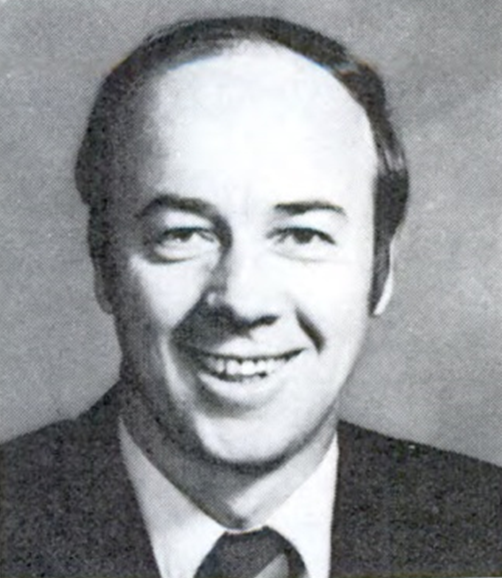

Member of the U.S. House of Representatives from Indiana's 2nd district
- In office January 3, 1975 – January 3, 1983
- Preceded by: Earl Landgrebe
- Succeeded by: Philip Sharp

Personal details
- Born: Floyd James Fithian; November 3, 1928 Vesta, Nebraska, U.S.
- Died: June 27, 2003 (aged 74) Annandale, Virginia, U.S.
- Resting place: Arlington National Cemetery
- Party: Democratic
- Spouse: Marjorie Heim
- Children: 3
- Education: Peru State College (BA); University of Nebraska (PhD)

Military service
- Allegiance: United States
- Branch/service: United States Navy; United States Navy Reserve
- Years of service: 1951–1955 (active duty); 1955–1971 (reserve duty)
- Rank: commander

Floyd James Fithian (November 3, 1928 – June 27, 2003) was an American educator and politician who served as a United States representative from Indiana as a Democrat. He was one of the forty nine Watergate Babies who won election to the House of Representatives in the wake of the Watergate scandal during the 1974 House elections with Fithian himself defeating Earl Landgrebe, who became infamous for his stalwart defense of President Richard Nixon. He was one of the fourteen members of the House Select Committee on Assassinations (HSCA) and believed that the Kennedy assassination in 1963 was orchestrated by members of organized crime.

== Early life ==
Floyd James Fithian was born in Vesta, Nebraska on November 3, 1928, and graduated from Vesta High School in 1947. In 1951, he became the first in his family to graduate from college when he received a Bachelor of Arts degree from Peru State College in Peru, Nebraska. He enlisted into the United States Navy in the same year and rose to the rank of lieutenant by the time he left in 1955. However, he continued to serve in the United States Navy Reserve, retiring in 1971 as a commander.

While in the navy, Fithian was able to attend the University of Nebraska, where he received his Master of Arts in 1955 and, after teaching at a high school from 1956 to 1959, a Ph.D. in American history in 1964 from the same institution. He taught briefly at Nebraska Wesleyan University and moved to Lafayette, Indiana in 1964 to become an associate professor of history at Purdue University. During his time at Purdue, he managed and operated a small farm in Tippecanoe County.

== Career ==
=== Early politics ===
During the 1968 presidential election he served as an associate Tippecanoe County coordinator for Robert Kennedy's presidential campaign. Afterwards he served as an associate Tippecanoe County coordinator for Birch Bayh's reelection campaign in Indiana's Senate race.

During the 1970 midterm elections he served as Tippecanoe County coordinator for Philip A. Sprague's house campaign against incumbent Republican Earl Landgrebe and as president of the 2nd District Win-Dems organization. Landgrebe narrowly defeated Sprague in the general election by only 1,204 votes, but he was the first Democratic congressional nominee to win Tippecanoe County since the 1930s. He was also selected to be one of the Democratic nominees for Tippecanoe County's three council seats by the county Democratic Central Committee, but came in fourth place.

=== United States House of Representatives ===
Fithian ran for Indiana's Second Congressional District during the 1972 elections and won the Democratic nomination. In the general election Landgrebe easily defeated him by riding off of the coattails of Richard Nixon's landslide victory in the 1972 presidential election and in Indiana where he received 66.1% of the vote statewide against George McGovern and received 72,000 more votes than Landgrebe in the second congressional district.

During the Watergate scandal Landgrebe was a stalwart defender of Nixon, explaining his refusal to listen to or read the transcript of the "smoking gun" tape that was released on August 5, 1974, and documented Nixon's complicity in the Watergate coverup, by stating, "Don't confuse me with the facts. I've got a closed mind. I will not vote for impeachment. I'm going to stick with my president even if he and I have to be taken out of this building and shot." Landgrebe received a massive backlash from voters in his district for his support of Nixon and was resoundingly defeated in the 1974 election in a rematch with Fithian. Fithian easily defeated Landgrebe in a landslide with 101,856 votes to 64,950 votes becoming the first Democratic candidate to win in Indiana's Second Congressional district since George R. Durgan in the 1932 elections when the Democrats also saw a landslide victory nationally.

In the 1976 elections the Indiana Republican Party ran a slate of candidates to defeat Fithian in the general election and retake the formerly strong Republican seat and chose Assistant Secretary of Agriculture William Erwin out of a five-man primary. However, Fithian won reelection with 54.6% of the vote against Erwin. In the 1978 elections Fithian saw his second-largest margin of victory, behind his victory against Landgrebe in 1974 due to the Watergate scandal hurting Republicans, due to Republicans running Jay Philip Oppenheim, a failed primary candidate in the district from the 1976 attempt to unseat Fithian, who had little name recognition and with William Costas, a Republican turned independent, taking votes from Oppenhiem gave Fithian a 20.3% margin of victory. Despite the Republicans performing well nationally in the 1980 elections and in Indiana, Fithian was able to win reelection by 8%.

In 1975 he introduced a balanced budget constitutional amendment, but it failed to gain any traction. In 1977 he supported the Torrijos–Carter Treaties which would give control of the Panama Canal to Panama in 1999 despite the majority of his district being against it. In 1976 he sent a letter to Secretary of Defense Donald Rumsfeld asking him to demand former Air Force Undersecretary James W. Plummer's resignation as executive vice president of Lockheed Corporation due to the conflict of interests that would be created. In 1982 he reintroduced the Equal Rights Amendment which had failed to be ratified by 38 states before its deadline, but it failed to pass.

During his tenure, Fithian served on the House Small Business Committee, the House Committee on Foreign Affairs, the House Committee on Agriculture and the House Committee on Government Operations where he served on the House Select Committee on Assassinations to investigate the assassination of Martin Luther King Jr.

=== 1982 U.S. Senate election ===
In 1982 Indiana lost a congressional district after the 1980 Census. Fithian's district was split between three more conservative districts. Fithian criticized the reapportionment and brought up that according to the apportionment formula Indiana was entitled to 10.574 congressional districts and New Mexico was entitled to 2.505 congressional districts yet despite the Indianan figure being higher Indiana was losing a district and New Mexico was gaining a district.

On July 13, 1981, Fithian announced that he would retire from the House and would not seek reelection in either the 3rd, 5th, or 7th congressional districts or challenge Senator Richard Lugar and would instead run for Secretary of State. However, on February 16, 1982, he announced that he would seek the Democratic nomination for Senator to challenge Lugar in the 1982 election. In the Democratic primary he faced Indiana State Senator Michael Kendall, who he earlier encouraged to run for the Senate who he defeated with 59% of the vote.

On November 2, 1982, he was defeated by Lugar who won with 54% of the vote against Fithian's 46% and won by 149,901 votes.

=== Post-House career ===
After his defeat he served as Chief of Staff for Illinois Senator Paul Simon from 1983 to 1992, and worked as the campaign manager for Simon's 1988 presidential campaign. Fithian also worked for Senator Lloyd Bentsen as the finance director when he was the head of the Democratic Senatorial Campaign Committee from 1983 to 1985. After working for Simon, he joined the Department of Agriculture working as Secretary of the Farm Credit Administration. In 1991 Oliver Stone's JFK, a political thriller based on the investigation into the Kennedy assassination by Jim Garrison, to critical acclaim although it was criticized for its historical inaccuracies and Floyd criticized the film for its manipulation of the past. On March 14, 2003, he joined seventy two other former congressmembers and signed a letter asking President George W. Bush and Prime Minister Tony Blair to give more time to the United Nations inspectors in Iraq.

On June 27, 2003, Fithian died at his retirement home in Annandale, Virginia after suffering from Parkinson's disease and was interred in Arlington National Cemetery.

== Electoral history ==
Floyd Fithian electoral history

1972 Indiana Second Congressional District election
Party	Candidate	Votes	%	±%
Republican	Earl Landgrebe (incumbent)	110,406	54.7%	+4.3%
Democratic	Floyd Fithian	91,533	45.3%	−4.3%
Total votes		201,939	100.0%	

1974 Indiana Second Congressional District election
Party	Candidate	Votes	%	±%
Democratic	Floyd Fithian	101,856	61.1%	+15.7%
Republican	Earl Landgrebe (incumbent)	64,950	38.9%	−15.3%
Total votes		166,806	100.0%	

1976 Indiana Second Congressional District election
Party	Candidate	Votes	%	±%
Democratic	Floyd Fithian (incumbent)	117,617	54.6%	−6.3%
Republican	William Erwin	95,605	44.5%	+5.6%
American	James Hensley Logan	1,623	0.8%	+0.8%
Total votes		214,845	100.0%	

1978 Indiana Second Congressional District election
Party	Candidate	Votes	%	±%
Democratic	Floyd Fithian (incumbent)	82,402	56.5%	+1.8%
Republican	Jay Philip Oppenheim	52,842	36.3%	−8.3%
Independent	William Costas	9,368	6.4%	+6.4%
American	James Hensley Logan	1,166	0.8%	+0.0%
Total votes		145,778	100.0%	

1980 Indiana Second Congressional District election
Party	Candidate	Votes	%	±%
Democratic	Floyd Fithian (incumbent)	122,326	54.1%	−2.5%
Republican	Ernest Niemeyer	103,957	45.9%	+9.7%
Total votes		226,283	100.0%	

1982 Indiana Senate election
Primary election
Party	Candidate	Votes	%
Democratic	Floyd Fithian	262,644	59.5%
Democratic	Michael Kendall	178,702	40.5%
Total votes		441,346	100.0%
General election
Republican	Richard Lugar (incumbent)	978,301	53.8%
Democratic	Floyd Fithian	828,400	45.6%
American	Raymond James	10,586	0.6%
Total votes		1,817,287	100.0%

Party political offices
Preceded by Vance Hartke	Democratic nominee for U.S. Senator from Indiana (Class 1); 1982	Succeeded by Jack Wickes
U.S. House of Representatives
Preceded by Earl F. Landgrebe	U.S. Representative of Indiana's 2nd congressional district 1975–1983	Succeeded by Philip R. Sharp
