= Earl Landgrebe =

American politician (1916–1986)

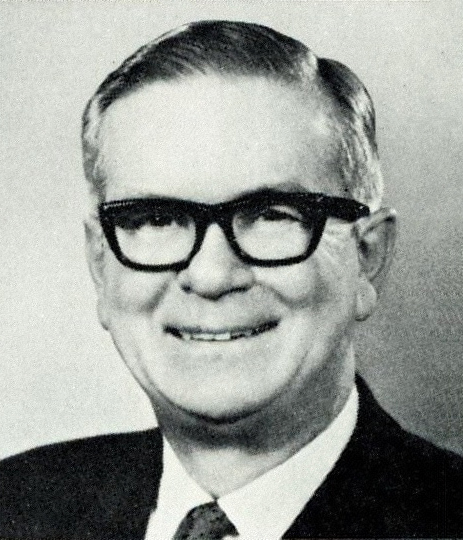

Member of the U.S. House of Representatives from Indiana's 2nd district
- In office January 3, 1969 – January 3, 1975
- Preceded by: Charles A. Halleck
- Succeeded by: Floyd Fithian

Member of the Indiana Senate from Jasper County, Newton County, Porter County and Pulaski County
- In office January 1, 1959 – August 30, 1968
- Preceded by: John Wilson Van Ness
- Succeeded by: Charles Borromeo Kleinkort

Personal details
- Born: Earl Fredrick Landgrebe; January 21, 1916 Valparaiso, Indiana, U.S.
- Died: June 29, 1986 (aged 70) Valparaiso, Indiana, U.S.
- Resting place: Blachly Cemetery, Valparaiso, Indiana, U.S.
- Party: Republican
- Spouse: Helen Lucille Field (m. 1936)
- Children: 2
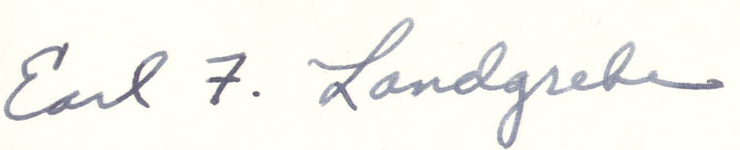
- Signature

Earl Fredrick Landgrebe (January 21, 1916 – June 29, 1986) was an American politician and businessman who served as a Republican senator in the Indiana Senate and member of the United States House of Representatives. During the Watergate scandal he defended President Richard Nixon, which cost him his seat in the 1974 congressional election.

In spite of his defense of Nixon during Watergate, Landgrebe was criticized throughout his House career by his primary opponents for not being supportive enough of Nixon, only voting with other Republicans slightly over 50% of the time, and for his frequent absences and nay votes in the state senate and House of Representatives.

== Early life ==
Earl Fredrick Landgrebe was born on January 21, 1916, in Valparaiso, Indiana, to Benna Marie Broderman and Edward William Landgrebe, a grocery store owner who later served as Porter County's assessor. Landgrebe attended Wheeler High School near Valparaiso. He married Helen Lucille Field on July 12, 1936, and had two sons with her.

On June 9, 1943, he founded a transportation business, Landgrebe Motor Transport, with one truck using $31028 in savings and would go on to grow his business to one hundred employees. In 1957, he was elected as president of Valparaiso's Chamber of commerce and was succeeded by Al Williamson following his election to the state senate in 1958.

== Career ==
=== State Senate ===
On March 21, 1958, Landgrebe filed to run in the Republican primary to succeed retiring incumbent John Wilson Van Ness for the Indiana Senate seat from Jasper County, Newton County, Porter County and Pulaski County and defeated Mayor John E. Wiggins and William A. Woodworth. In the general election, he defeated Democratic nominee Maurice Mason. During his tenure Landgrebe served on the Elections, Financial Institutions, Transportation, and Benevolent and Penal Institutions committees. In 1961, he introduced the bill to create the Indiana Port Authority to oversee the creation of seaports along Lake Michigan. During the 1960 presidential election, Landgrebe supported vice president Richard Nixon and on April 21, 1960, he was appointed as the Porter County chairman in the Indiana Committee for Nixon by Porter County Republican Chairman Bill Conover.

In 1962, the United States Supreme Court ruled in Baker v. Carr that the 14th Amendment applied to state apportionment and that federal courts are open to lawsuits challenging state legislative districts leading to further lawsuits over redistricting. After Reynolds v. Sims the Indiana state legislature created a bill to reappropriate the districts and Landgrebe was the only Republican to vote against it alongside twenty-two Democrats, causing the bill to not pass.

Later in 1962, Landgrebe announced that he would seek reelection and won the Republican nomination without opposition. He later defeated Democratic nominee Ted Savich in the general election. On March 4, 1966, he announced that he would seek reelection to a third term. State representative Robert D. Anderson mounted a primary challenge against him, but Landgrebe narrowly won the Republican nomination with 4,617 votes to Anderson's 4,232 votes. In the general election, Landgrebe easily defeated Democratic nominee Richard Glen Percifield with 22,070 votes to 13,300 votes.

On March 6, 1964, he announced his intention to seek the Republican nomination for Governor of Indiana, but was overshadowed by other candidates in the race that included Lieutenant Governor Richard O. Ristine, State Treasurer Robert E. Hughes, and Secretary of State Charles O. Hendricks and during balloting at the Republican state convention, he came in last place out of seven candidates, with only one delegate compared to Richard O. Ristine's 1,212 delegates.

In 1965, he was reassigned Senate committee positions and was placed onto the Judiciary B, Legislative Apportionment, Public Safety, and Transportation senate committees, but Landgrebe had little power on the apportionment committee due to eight of the eleven members being Democrats. In 1967, Landgrebe was reassigned to the Labor, Roads, and Transportation senate committees.

=== House of Representatives ===
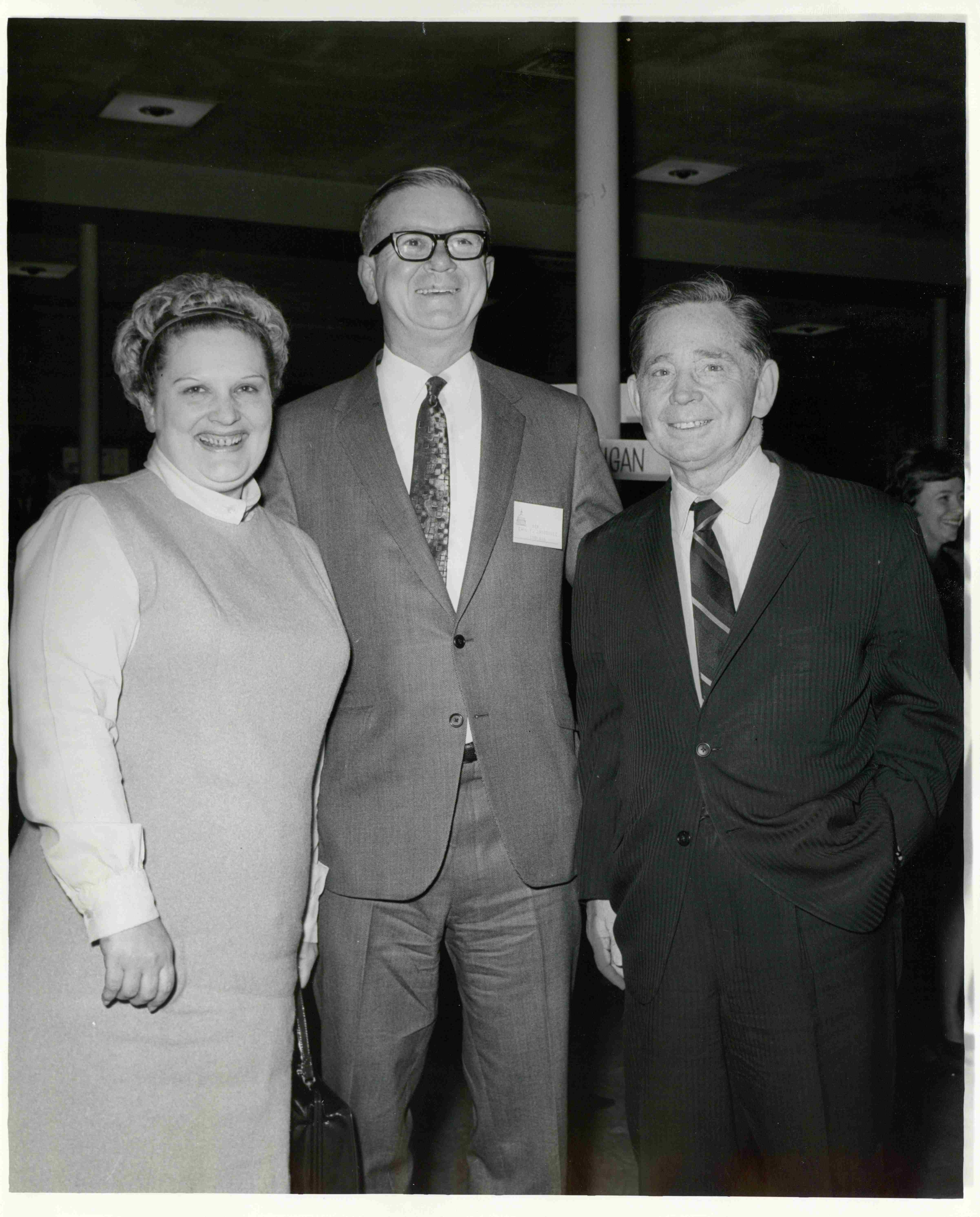
Landgrebe with Speaker Carl Albert

Landgrebe's service in the state senate ended in 1968 when he won election to the United States House of Representatives. On March 1, 1968, he announced his intention to run for the Republican nomination for Indiana's Second Congressional District to succeed Charles A. Halleck who was retiring. Landgrebe won the Republican nomination following a primary recount with a plurality of 21.76% and only eighty votes more than Olyer U. Sullivan. He represented Indiana's 2nd congressional district during the 91st, 92nd and 93rd sessions of congress and was a member of the Education and Labor Committee and a ranking minority member on the Subcommittee on Government Operations and the Subcommittee on Agricultural Labor.

In 1970, Albert Harrigan, who was a candidate in the 1968 primary, and Donald W. Blue, the mayor of Lafayette, announced that they would challenge Landgrebe for the Republican nomination. Landgrebe was criticized by Blue and Harrigan for missing multiple votes and not being supportive enough of Nixon. He received his largest amount of support throughout his House career in the 1970 primary with 56.48% of the vote with the rest being divided between Harrigan and Blue. The Democratic Party fared well nationally during the 1970 House elections and Landgrebe narrowly held onto his seat, by only 1,204 votes against Phillip Sprague. During the campaign, Landgrebe spent $39,334 and Sprague spent $57,918.

On March 23, 1971, the House of Representatives voted on the proposed Twenty-sixth Amendment, which lowered the voting age from twenty-one to eighteen years old, which easily passed with 401 in favor and 19 against. Landgrebe did not participate in the vote on the amendment, but in the past he had stated he was against lowering the voting age, as the votes of 18 year olds would dilute the votes of older voters.

On November 9, 1971, Richard Boehning, the House Majority Leader of the Indiana House of Representatives, announced that he would challenge Landgrebe for the Republican nomination, later citing his narrow victory in 1970 and for not joining the Committee for the Re-Election of the President. During the primary, Landgrebe received the endorsement of fifty-one members of the House of Representatives. However, David W. Dennis was the only member of the Indiana state delegation to endorse him and Charles A. Halleck, who had served in the district before Landgrebe and House Majority and Minority Leader, gave his endorsement to Boehning. Landgrebe narrowly defeated Boehning, with 34,813 votes for 54.20% against his adversary's 29,417 votes for 45.80% of the vote. In the general election, he easily defeated Purdue University professor Floyd Fithian by riding off the coattails of Richard Nixon's landslide victory in the 1972 presidential election and in Indiana, where Nixon received 66.11% of the vote statewide against George McGovern and received 76,000 more votes than Landgrebe in the second congressional district.

Landgrebe gained a reputation in Congress as a "colorful loner" with a unique brand of conservatism. He criticized Lyndon B. Johnson for reducing bombardment of North Vietnam in 1968 and initially supported the United States' invasion of Cambodia ordered by Nixon, but later came out against it and would rather have had the United States invade North Vietnam. In 1972, Landgrebe was arrested during an official visit to the Soviet Union to observe their education facilities, due to him distributing Bibles, which he did as he was a devout Lutheran. In 1973, he became ill and was treated at Walter Reed National Military Medical Center for ten days, during which Nixon visited him.

=== Watergate ===
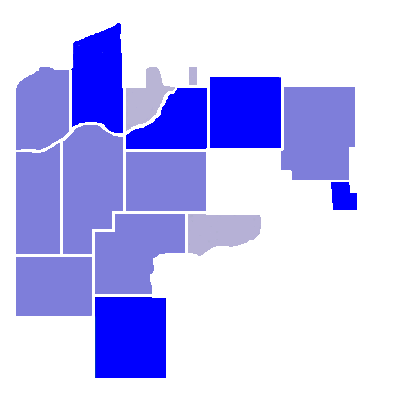
1974 Indiana's 2nd congressional district election county results Fithian 55%< Fithian 60%< Fithian 70%<

Landgrebe was a stalwart defender of President Nixon throughout the Watergate scandal and during the Nixon impeachment hearings. When the House of Representatives voted to begin the impeachment hearings, 410 voted in favor and Landgrebe was one of the four who voted against. Even after the transcript of the "smoking gun" tape was released on August 5, 1974, documenting Nixon's complicity in the Watergate coverup, Landgrebe remained loyal and refused to listen to the tapes or read the transcripts. When asked about the damning tape transcript and the resultant rapid collapse of support for the president among Republicans in Congress and the likelihood that Nixon would be impeached, he said: "Don't confuse me with the facts. I've got a closed mind. I will not vote for impeachment. I'm going to stick with my president even if he and I have to be taken out of this building and shot." On August 8, 1974, when Nixon gave his televised resignation speech Landgrebe was one of 42 people in the White House during it. When the House of Representatives voted to accept the committee's report following Nixon's resignation, the vote was 412 in favor and 3 against; the three opposed were Landgrebe, Otto Passman, and Sonny Montgomery. When the House voted on former New York Governor Nelson Rockefeller's confirmation as vice president to President Gerald Ford, he was one of 30 Republicans to vote against him due to his "extreme liberalism".

Landgrebe was named as one of the top "Ten Dumbest Congressmen" by New Times alongside Senators William L. Scott and Roman Hruska and Representatives William A. Barrett, Harold Donohue, Floyd Spence, Harold L. Runnels, John Rarick, and Joseph J. Maraziti. Landgrebe received a massive backlash from voters in his district for his support of Nixon and was resoundingly defeated in the 1974 election, although this was the only time in his House career that he did not face a primary challenge. In the election, Landgrebe lost to Democratic nominee Floyd Fithian and only received 64,950 votes to Fithian's 101,856 votes (38.94% vs. 61.06% respectively).

Landgrebe continued to support Nixon for the rest of his life, saying in a 1984 interview, "Show me an impeachable offense ... Compare it to the wonderful things for this country this man had done". In 2019, Jake Tapper compared Senator Lindsey Graham to Landgrebe over his position on Trump's actions in Ukraine and the Congressional impeachment inquiry into it.

== Later life ==
After his defeat, Earl Landgrebe returned to his home in Valparaiso where he owned and managed his transportation business. In February 1980, the Machinist Union was on strike at the Union Rolls Corporation in Valparaiso, Indiana. In the past he would personally deliver through the picket line such as in 1961 when as a state senator he made a delivery to a pool company plant that was experiencing a strike. The former congressman personally confronted picketers with a tractor trailer this time as well and on February 13, he completed two trips into the Union Rolls plant to pick up and haul away merchandise. Both times, the Union unsuccessfully tried to prevent his entrance into the plant, but on a third trip later that day, he was unable as union members surrounded the truck and swung clubs which broke mirrors and shattered glass. Landgrebe was showered with broken glass and a local sheriff had to break up the incident.

=== Death and burial ===
On June 29, 1986, Landgrebe died at home from a heart attack at age 70 and was buried in Blanchly Cemetery. Richard Nixon released a statement praising him for his loyal support, and sent a representative to the funeral.

== Political positions ==
=== Foreign policy ===
Landgrebe stated that the Warsaw Pact invasion of Czechoslovakia was proof that the Cold War could not be 'thawed'. When the USS Pueblo was captured by North Korea in 1968 he supported sending a forty eight hour ultimatum that would threaten nuclear warfare unless all of the Americans were returned. In 1972 the House of Representatives voted to approve the Strategic Arms Limitation Talks treaty between the United States and the Soviet Union that had a "freeze" on offensive missiles for five years. The vote in the House was 329 in favor and 7 against with Landgrebe as one of the seven nays.

He opposed the continuation of the Vietnam War, but only supported ending it with an American victory and during his 1968 House campaign he supported ending all foreign aid to North Vietnam. He initially supported the invasion of Cambodia, but later criticized it and instead supported a direct invasion of North Vietnam. He supported Nixon's Peace with Honor plan and cited his ending of the wars in Southeast Asia as one of the reasons he remained loyal to Nixon during the Watergate scandal.

He was opposed to any change of the military draft age and stated that the only ones in favor of it were draft dodgers.

=== Domestic issues ===
While a member of the Indiana state senate Landgrebe supported right to work laws and voted against a law that would have made racial segregation in state public schools illegal. Landgrebe was against Indiana's state Civil Rights Commission and stated that "if we need a 12-man commission to protect the rights of Negroes, who represent maybe 12 percent of our state population, then why not have a much bigger group to see that the Negroes don't discriminate against us?" He also described himself as a law and order politician and criticized the United States Supreme Court for its ruling on law enforcement subjects.

He was against the legalization of drugs and supported giving the death penalty to non-addicted drug dealers. He supported the "Dangerous Substances Bill" which gave drug dealers sentences from five years to life imprisonment and a mandatory fine of $50,000.

In 1972, he refused to answer a survey conducted by consumer activist Ralph Nader on the United States Congress and referred to him as an "upshot Johnny-comelately" despite multiple attempts by Nader representatives to convince him to take the survey.

== Electoral history ==
Earl Landgrebe electoral history

1968 Indiana Second Congressional District Republican Primary
Party	Candidate	Votes	%
Republican	Earl Landgrebe	12,493	21.76%
Republican	Olyer U. Sullivan	12,413	21.62%
Republican	Quentin A. Blachly	8,946	15.58%
Republican	Albert Harrigan	5,871	10.22%
Republican	Ernest Niemeyer	4,993	8.70%
Republican	Robert R. Becker	4,415	7.69%
Republican	Thomas Thorson	4,255	7.41%
Republican	Joe Weinberg	1,738	3.03%
Republican	Edwin C. Gutwein	1,701	2.96%
Republican	John Curtis Wood	597	1.04%
Total votes		57,422	100.00%

1968 Indiana Second Congressional District election
Party	Candidate	Votes	%	±%
Republican	Earl Landgrebe	104,238	55.06%	−1.03%
Democratic	Edward F. Kelly	85,084	44.94%	+1.03%
Total votes		189,322	100.00%	

1970 Indiana Second Congressional District Republican Primary
Party	Candidate	Votes	%	±%
Republican	Earl Landgrebe (incumbent)	27,205	56.48%	+34.72%
Republican	Albert Harrigan	10,954	22.74%	+12.52%
Republican	Donald W. Blue	10,005	20.77%	
Total votes		48,164	100.00%	

1970 Indiana Second Congressional District election
Party	Candidate	Votes	%	±%
Republican	Earl Landgrebe (incumbent)	79,163	50.38%	−4.68%
Democratic	Phillip Sprague	77,959	49.62%	+4.68%
Total votes		157,122	100.00%	

1972 Indiana Second Congressional District Republican Primary
Party	Candidate	Votes	%	±%
Republican	Earl Landgrebe (incumbent)	34,813	54.20%	−2.28%
Republican	Richard Boehning	29,417	45.80%	
Total votes		64,230	100.00%	

1972 Indiana Second Congressional District election
Party	Candidate	Votes	%	±%
Republican	Earl Landgrebe (incumbent)	110,406	54.67%	+4.29%
Democratic	Floyd Fithian	91,533	45.33%	−4.29%
Total votes		201,939	100.00%	

1974 Indiana Second Congressional District election
Party	Candidate	Votes	%	±%
Democratic	Floyd Fithian	101,856	61.06%	+15.73%
Republican	Earl Landgrebe (incumbent)	64,950	38.94%	−15.73%
Total votes		166,806	100.00%	

U.S. House of Representatives
Preceded by Charles A. Halleck	U.S. Representative of Indiana's 2nd Congressional District; 1969–1975	Succeeded by Floyd Fithian
