= Robert W. Miers =

American politician (1848–1930)

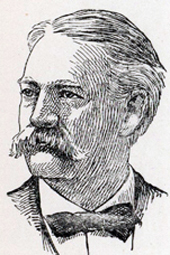
- Engraving of Miers

Personal details
- Born: Robert Walter Miers; January 27, 1848 near Greensburg, Indiana, U.S.
- Died: February 20, 1930 (aged 82) Martinsville, Indiana, U.S.
- Resting place: Rosehill Cemetery; Bloomington, Indiana, U.S.
- Party: Democratic
- Education: Indiana University; Indiana University Maurer School of Law
- Occupation: Politician; judge; lawyer

Robert Walter Miers (January 27, 1848 – February 20, 1930) was a U.S. representative from Indiana.

== Early life ==
Robert Walter Miers was born on January 27, 1848, near Greensburg, Indiana. Miers attended the common schools. He was graduated from the academic department of Indiana University Bloomington in 1870 and from its law department in 1871. He was admitted to the bar in April 1872 and commenced practice in Bloomington, Indiana.

== Career ==
Miers served as prosecuting attorney for the tenth judicial circuit of Indiana from 1875 to 1879. He served as member of the State house of representatives in 1879, and was a member of the board of trustees of Indiana University from 1879 to 1897. He was appointed judge of the tenth judicial circuit of Indiana in 1883, elected in 1884 and again in 1890, and served until September 1896, when he resigned to become a candidate for Congress. He was an unsuccessful Democratic nominee for Indiana Secretary of State in 1886 and in 1888.

Miers was elected as a Democrat to the Fifty-fifth and to the three succeeding Congresses (March 4, 1897 – March 3, 1905). He was an unsuccessful candidate for reelection in 1904 to the Fifty-ninth Congress. He resumed the practice of law.

Miers was again elected judge of the tenth circuit of Indiana on November 3, 1914, and served until November 22, 1920. He continued the practice of law in Bloomington, Indiana, until 1928.

== Personal life ==
Miers died while on a visit in Martinsville, Indiana, on February 20, 1930. He was interred in Rosehill Cemetery in Bloomington, Indiana.

U.S. House of Representatives
Preceded by Alexander M. Hardy	Member of the U.S. House of Representatives from Indiana's 2nd congressional district 1897-1905	Succeeded by John C. Chaney
