= John Ewing (Indiana politician) =

American politician

Member of the U.S. House of Representatives from Indiana's 2nd district
- In office March 4, 1837 – March 3, 1839
- Preceded by: John W. Davis
- Succeeded by: John W. Davis

Member of the U.S. House of Representatives from Indiana's 2nd district
- In office March 4, 1833 – March 3, 1835
- Preceded by: John Carr
- Succeeded by: John W. Davis

Personal details
- Born: May 19, 1789 County Cork, Ireland
- Died: April 6, 1858 (aged 68)
- Party: Whig
- Other political affiliations: Anti-Jacksonian (before 1837)

Military service
- Rank: Lieutenant colonel

John Ewing (May 19, 1789 – April 6, 1858) was a member of the United States House of Representatives from Indiana.

== Early life ==
He was born in County Cork, Ireland. As a child his family moved to the United States and settled in Baltimore, Maryland. In 1813 he moved to Vincennes, Indiana. He was involved in both business and in publishing a local paper.

== Judicial career ==
From 1816 until 1820 he was an Associate Justice of the Circuit Court of Knox County, Indiana. He resigned from this post in 1820. In both 1816 and 1821, he ran unsuccessfully for the Indiana State Senate.

In 1825 he was appointed a lieutenant colonel of the State Militia. He also began serving in the Indiana Senate that year. He continued to serve in the State Senate until 1833 when he was elected to the United States Congress.

Six candidates vied for the seat he won, with only 20.94% of the vote. He only led his closest opponent by two votes. At this point he is most often identified as an anti-Jacksonian.

He was also elected to the congress that convened in 1837, this time as a Whig, and with a greater percentage of the votes cast.

U.S. House of Representatives
Preceded by John Carr	Member of the U.S. House of Representatives from Indiana's 2nd congressional district 1833-1835	Succeeded by John Wesley Davis
Preceded by John Wesley Davis	Member of the U.S. House of Representatives from Indiana's 2nd congressional district 1837-1839	Succeeded by John Wesley Davis
