= 1982 United States Senate election in Indiana =

- November 2, 1982
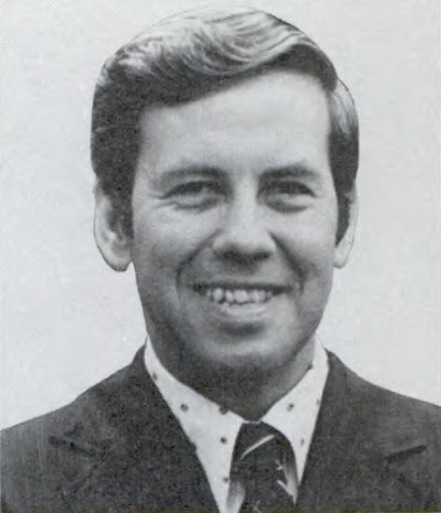

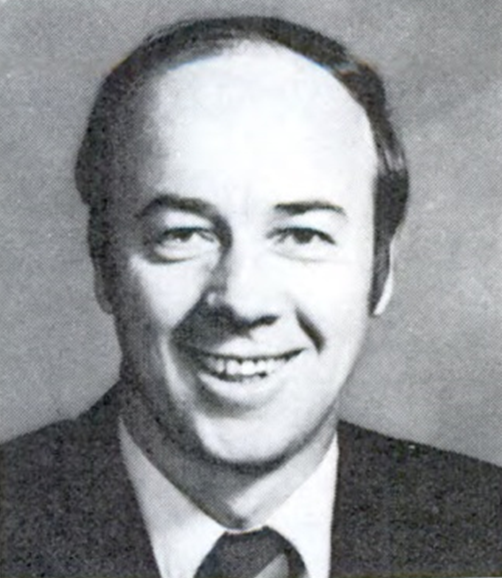
Nominee	Richard Lugar	Floyd Fithian
Party	Republican	Democratic
Popular vote	978,301	828,400
Percentage	53.83%	45.58%
- County results Lugar: 40–50% 50–60% 60–70% 70–80% Fithian: 40–50% 50–60% 60–70%
U.S. senator before election
Richard Lugar
Republican
Elected U.S. Senator
Richard Lugar
Republican

The 1982 United States Senate election in Indiana was held on November 2, 1982. Incumbent Republican United States Senator Richard Lugar faced Democratic United States Representative Floyd Fithian in the general election. Lugar won with a margin of 54% of the vote, compared to Fithian's 46%. This was Lugar's closest election out of his 6 senate elections for the class 1 seat.

== Republican primary ==
=== Candidates ===
- Richard Lugar, incumbent U.S. Senator

=== Results ===
Incumbent United States Senator Richard Lugar won the Republican nomination in an uncontested primary on May 4, 1982.

Republican primary results
Party	Candidate	Votes	%
Republican	Richard Lugar (Incumbent)	498,248	100
Total votes		498,248	

== Democratic primary ==
=== Candidates ===
- Floyd Fithian, U.S. Representative from Tippecanoe County
- Michael Kendall, State Senator from Jasper

=== Campaign ===
After the 1980 Census, the Indiana General Assembly redistricted Indiana's congressional districts, pushing Democratic representative Floyd Fithian's district into more conservative territory. After redistricting, Fithian, the three term incumbent of Indiana's 2nd congressional district, decided to run for Secretary of State of Indiana, but withdrew from the primary to ultimately run for the United States Senate. He challenged fellow Democrat and one term Indiana State Senator Michael Kendall of Jasper, Indiana, who Fithian earlier encouraged to run for the Senate. Kendall, who represented Indiana's 47th Senate district and formed the Notre Dame Students for Robert F. Kennedy organization during the 1968 presidential election, was seen a young progressive alternative to Fithian, who he called the "ideological twin of Richard Lugar." After the bitterly contested primary, Fithian prevailed over Kendall, winning with 59% of the vote.

=== Results ===
Democratic primary results
Party	Candidate	Votes	%
Democratic	Floyd Fithian	262,644	59.5
Democratic	Michael Kendall	178,702	40.5
Total votes		441,346	100

== General election ==
In the general election, Lugar faced Fithian and American Party candidate Raymond James.

On November 2, 1982, Lugar defeated Fithian and James in the general election, winning 74 of Indiana's 93 counties.

United States Senate election in Indiana, 1982
Party	Candidate	Votes	%
Republican	Richard Lugar (Incumbent)	978,301	53.8
Democratic	Floyd Fithian	828,400	45.6
American	Raymond James	10,568	0.6
Republican hold			

== See also ==
- 1982 United States Senate elections
- 1982 United States House of Representatives elections in Indiana
