= William A. Cullop =

American politician

William Cullop
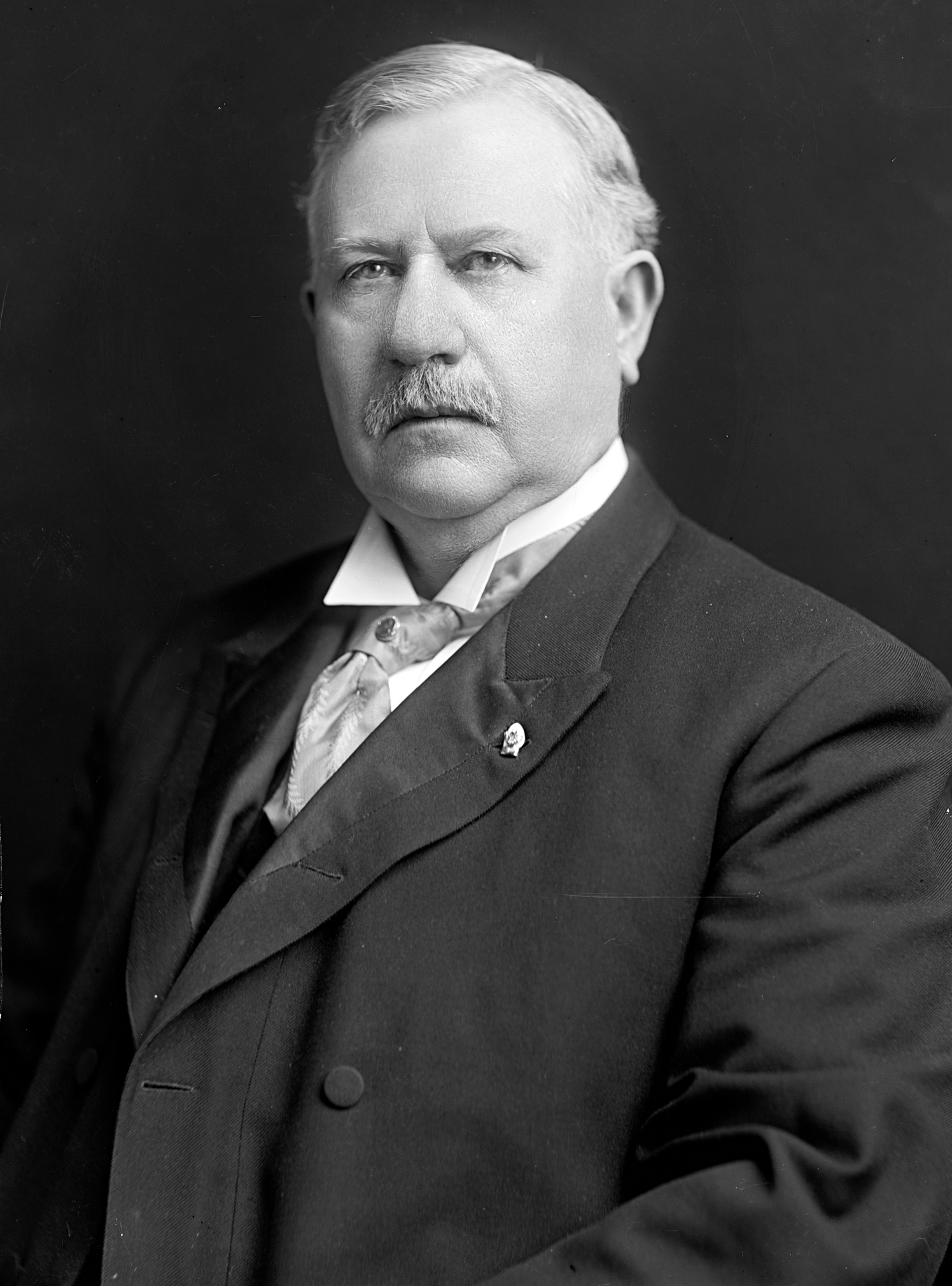

Member of the U.S. House of Representatives from Indiana's 2nd district
- In office March 4, 1909 – March 4, 1917
- Preceded by: John C. Chaney
- Succeeded by: Oscar E. Bland

Personal details
- Born: March 28, 1853 Oaktown, Indiana, US
- Died: October 9, 1927 (aged 74) Vincennes, Indiana, US
- Party: Democratic
- Education: Hanover College
- Profession: Attorney

William Allen Cullop (March 28, 1853 – October 9, 1927) was an American lawyer, educator, and politician who served four terms as a U.S. representative from Indiana from 1909 to 1917.

== Biography ==
Born near Oaktown, Indiana, Cullop attended the common schools. He attended Hanover College from August 1870 until June 1878, majoring in law. After graduating from law school, Cullop worked as a professor at Vincennes University from 1879 to 1880. He was admitted to the bar in 1881 and commenced practice in Vincennes, Indiana. He served as prosecuting attorney of the Twelfth Judicial Circuit from 1883 to 1886. He served as a member of the Insian House of Representatives from 1891 to 1893. He was a delegate to the Democratic National Conventions in 1892 and 1896.

=== Congress ===
Cullop was elected as a Democrat to the Sixty-first and the three succeeding Congresses (March 4, 1909 – March 3, 1917). He was an unsuccessful candidate for renomination in 1916. He was an unsuccessful candidate for the Democratic nomination for United States Senator in 1926.

=== Later career and death ===
He resumed law practice and was also interested in various business enterprises. He died in Vincennes, Indiana, on October 9, 1927. He was interred in Greenlawn Cemetery.

U.S. House of Representatives
Preceded by John C. Chaney	Member of the U.S. House of Representatives from Indiana's 2nd congressional district 1909-1917	Succeeded by Oscar E. Bland
