= John L. Bretz =

American politician

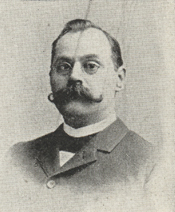

Member of the U.S. House of Representatives from Indiana's 2nd district
- In office March 4, 1891 – March 3, 1895
- Preceded by: John H. O'Neall
- Succeeded by: Alexander M. Hardy

Personal details
- Born: John Lewis Bretz; September 21, 1852 Near Huntingburg, Indiana, U.S.
- Died: December 25, 1920 (aged 68) Tonopah, Nevada, U.S.
- Resting place: Tonopah Cemetery
- Party: Democratic

John Lewis Bretz (September 21, 1852 – December 25, 1920) was an American lawyer and politician who served two terms as a U.S. representative from Indiana from 1891 to 1895.

== Biography ==
Born near Huntingburg, Indiana, Bretz attended the country schools and Huntingburg High School. He taught school 1876–1880. He studied law, and was graduated from the Cincinnati Law School in 1880. He was admitted to the bar and commenced practice in Jasper, Indiana. He served as prosecuting attorney of the eleventh judicial circuit 1884–1890.

=== Congress ===
Bretz was elected as a Democrat to the Fifty-second and Fifty-third Congresses (March 4, 1891 – March 3, 1895). He was an unsuccessful candidate for reelection in 1894 to the Fifty-fourth Congress.

=== Later career ===
He served as judge of the circuit court of Pike and Dubois Counties from 1895 until his death. He served as delegate to the Democratic National Convention in 1900.

=== Death and burial ===
He died in Jasper, Indiana, December 25, 1920. He was interred in Fairmount Cemetery, Huntingburg, Indiana.

U.S. House of Representatives
Preceded by John H. O'Neall	Member of the U.S. House of Representatives from Indiana's 2nd congressional district 1891-1895	Succeeded by Alexander M. Hardy
