= John H. O'Neall =

American politician

John O'Neall
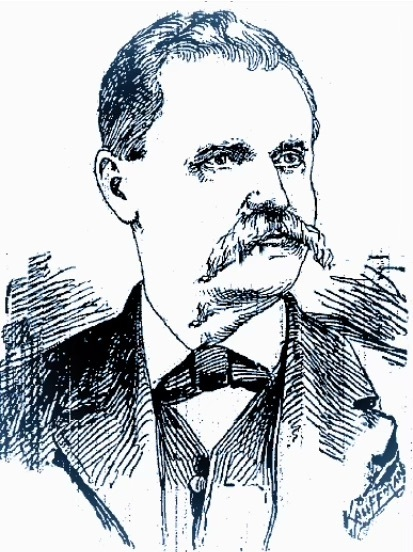

Member of the U.S. House of Representatives from Indiana's 2nd district
- In office March 4, 1887 – March 3, 1891
- Preceded by: Thomas R. Cobb
- Succeeded by: John L. Bretz

Personal details
- Born: October 30, 1838 Newberry, South Carolina, U.S.
- Died: July 15, 1907 (aged 68) Washington, Indiana, U.S
- Party: Democratic
- Education: Indiana University Bloomington; University of Michigan

John Henry O'Neall (October 30, 1838 – July 15, 1907) was an American lawyer and politician who served two terms as a U.S. representative from Indiana from 1887 to 1891.

== Biography ==
Born in Newberry, South Carolina, O'Neall was left an orphan at eight years of age and was raised by his grandfather, who lived in Daviess County, Indiana. He attended country schools and graduated from Indiana University Bloomington in 1862. He then graduated from the law department of the University of Michigan at Ann Arbor in 1864.

He was admitted to the bar the same year and practiced in Terre Haute, Indiana and later in Washington, Indiana. He served in the State legislature in 1866. He was appointed prosecuting attorney for the eleventh judicial circuit in 1873.

O'Neall was elected to the office in 1874, but resigned before his term was completed.

== Congress ==
O'Neall was elected as a Democrat to the Fiftieth and Fifty-first Congresses (March 4, 1887 – March 3, 1891). He was not a candidate for renomination in 1890.

== Later career and death ==
He resumed the practice of law in Washington, Indiana. School trustee of Washington for fifteen years. He served as delegate to the Democratic National Convention in 1896. City attorney of Washington 1899–1907. Organized the Federal Trust Co. in 1899 and was its president until 1902, when it was made a national bank. He died in Washington, Indiana, July 15, 1907. He was interred in St. John's Cemetery.

U.S. House of Representatives
Preceded by Thomas R. Cobb	Member of the U.S. House of Representatives from Indiana's 2nd congressional district 1887-1891	Succeeded by John L. Bretz
