= Alexander M. Hardy =

American politician (1847–1927)

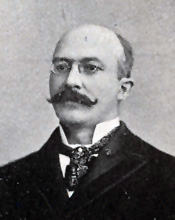

Member of the U.S. House of Representatives from Indiana's 2nd district
- In office March 4, 1895 – March 3, 1897
- Preceded by: John L. Bretz
- Succeeded by: Robert W. Miers

Personal details
- Born: December 16, 1847 Simcoe, Norfolk County, Ontario, Canada
- Died: August 31, 1927 (aged 79) Tonopah, Nevada, U.S.
- Resting place: Tonopah Cemetery.
- Party: Republican

Alexander Merrill Hardy (December 16, 1847 – August 31, 1927) was an American lawyer and politician who served one term as a U.S. representative from Indiana from 1895 to 1897.

== Biography ==
Born in Simcoe, Norfolk County, Ontario, Canada, Hardy pursued a college course and studied law. He came to the United States in 1864, taking a commercial course at Eastman College, Poughkeepsie, New York. He went to New Orleans in 1869, where he engaged in newspaper work until 1873, when he moved to Natchez, Mississippi. He conducted a Republican newspaper until 1877. He served as collector of the port of Natchez under appointment of President Grant. He moved to Washington, Indiana, in 1884. He was admitted to the bar in 1884 and commenced practice in Terre Haute, Indiana.

== Congress ==
Hardy was elected as a Republican to the Fifty-fourth Congress (March 4, 1895 – March 3, 1897). He was an unsuccessful candidate for reelection in 1896 to the Fifty-fifth Congress.

== Later career and death ==
He resumed the practice of law in Washington, Indiana. He moved to Los Angeles, California, in 1904 and continued the practice of law. He moved to Searchlight, Nevada, thence to Salt Lake City, Utah, and finally settled in Tonopah, Nevada, in 1914 and engaged in the practice of his profession. He was also interested in mining. He died in Tonopah, Nevada, on August 31, 1927, and was interred in Tonopah Cemetery.

U.S. House of Representatives
Preceded by John L. Bretz	Member of the U.S. House of Representatives from Indiana's 2nd congressional district 1895-1897	Succeeded by Robert W. Miers
