= Richard Boehning =

American politician (born 1937)

Indiana House of Representatives Majority Floor Leader
- In office November 27, 1968 – 1972

State Representative from Tippecanoe County
- In office 1966–1972 Serving with Frances Gaylord

Personal details
- Born: July 2, 1937 (age 89) Rensselaer, Indiana, U.S.
- Party: Republican
- Spouse: Phyllis Albrecht Gutwein (m. 1957; died 2015)
- Children: 5
- Education: Indiana University Bloomington; Indiana University School of Law

Richard A. Boehning ((pronounced ben-ing) born July 2, 1937) was an American politician and businessman who served as a state representative and state House Majority Floor Leader as a Republican.

== Life ==
Richard A. Boehning was born on July 2, 1937, in Rensselaer, Indiana, and attended Francesville High School.

In 1957 he married Phyllis Albrecht Gutwein whom he would later have five children with and who would serve on the Lafayette City Council from 1984 to 1999. In 1959 he graduated from Indiana University Bloomington with a Bachelor of Science degree and graduated from the Indiana University School of Law in 1961. In 1961 he became a precinct committeeman in Francesville and in 1964 he was appointed as Lafayette's city attorney by Mayor Donald W. Blue.

On March 7, 1966, he announced that he would run for the Republican nomination for state representative from Tippecanoe County. On May 3, 1966, he and Frances Gaylord won the top two Republican primary and both received the Republican nomination and both went on to win in the general election against Democratic nominees Harry A. Fink and Robert L. Huffman. In the 1967 session he served as chairman of the Cities and Towns House committee and served as a member on the Judiciary and Natural Resources and Conservation committees.

On November 27, 1968, he was elected as House Majority Floor Leader after defeating four other candidates on the third ballot with 36 out of 71 votes. On January 13, 1971, he introduced a constitutional amendment to Indiana's constitution that would lower the voting age from 21 years old to 18 years old two months ahead of the federal 26th Amendment.

He considered running in the Republican primary against Representative Earl Landgrebe in the Second Congressional District during the 1970 election, but later chose not to. On November 9, 1971, Boehning announced that he would challenge Landgrebe for the Republican nomination in Indiana's Second Congressional District later citing Landgrebe's narrow victory in 1970 and him being the only member of Indiana's Republican delegation to refuse to join the Indiana section of the Committee for the Re-Election of the President. During the primary Charles A. Halleck, who had served in the district before Landgrebe and House Majority and Minority Leader, gave his endorsement to Boehning. Landgrebe narrowly defeated Boehning with 34,813 votes for 54.20% against his 29,417 votes for 45.80% of the vote.

== Electoral history ==
Richard Boehning electoral history

1966 Indiana Tippecanoe County State Representative election
Primary election
| Party | Candidate | Votes | % |
|---|---|---|---|
| Republican | Frances Gaylord | 5,186 | 27.35% |
| Republican | Richard Boehning | 4,104 | 21.64% |
| Republican | Hal L. Force | 2,998 | 15.81% |
| Republican | Bruce Osborn | 2,611 | 13.77% |
| Republican | Kenneth L. Thayer | 2,507 | 13.22% |
| Republican | William German | 1,557 | 8.21% |
| Total votes | | 18,963 | 100.00% |
General election
| Republican | Richard Boehning | 19,555 | 32.11% |
| Republican | Frances Gaylord | 19,361 | 31.79% |
| Democratic | Robert L. Huffman | 11,058 | 18.16% |
| Democratic | Harry A. Fink | 10,921 | 17.93% |
| Total votes | | 60,895 | 100.00% |

1972 Indiana Second Congressional District Republican Primary
| Party | Candidate | Votes | % | ±% |
|---|---|---|---|---|
| Republican | Earl Landgrebe | 34,813 | 54.20% | −2.28% |
| Republican | Richard Boehning | 29,417 | 45.80% | N/A |
| Total votes | | 64,230 | 100.00% | |
