= Oscar E. Bland =

American politician and jurist (1877–1951)

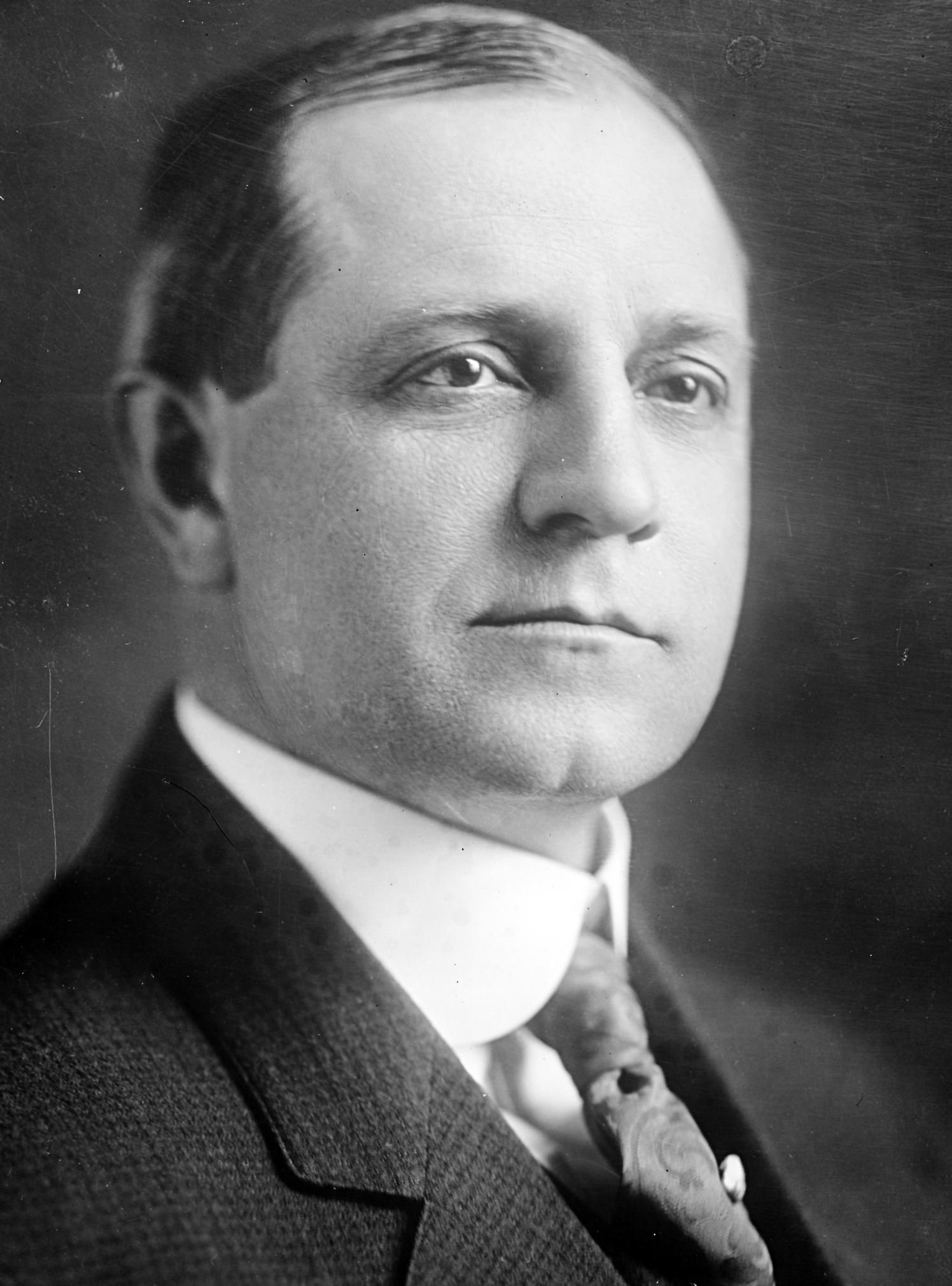

Associate Judge of the United States Court of Customs and Patent Appeals
- In office March 3, 1923 – December 1, 1947
- Appointed by: Warren G. Harding
- Preceded by: Marion De Vries
- Succeeded by: Noble J. Johnson

Member of the U.S. House of Representatives from Indiana's 2nd district
- In office March 4, 1917 – March 3, 1923
- Preceded by: William A. Cullop
- Succeeded by: Arthur H. Greenwood

Member of the Indiana Senate
- In office 1907-1909

Personal details
- Born: Oscar Edward Bland; November 21, 1877 Bloomfield, Indiana, U.S.
- Died: August 3, 1951 (aged 73) Washington, D.C., U.S.
- Resting place: Fort Lincoln Cemetery; Washington, D.C.
- Party: Republican
- Education: Valparaiso University; Indiana University Bloomington read law

Oscar Edward Bland (November 21, 1877 – August 3, 1951) was a United States representative from Indiana and an associate judge of the United States Court of Customs and Patent Appeals.

== Education and career ==
Born near Bloomfield, Indiana, Bland attended the public schools, Northern Indiana Normal School (now Valparaiso University) and Indiana University Bloomington. He taught school for three years. He read law and was admitted to the bar in 1901 and commenced practice in Linton, Indiana.

=== State Senate ===
He served as member of the Indiana Senate from 1907 to 1909.

== Congressional service ==
Bland was an unsuccessful Republican candidate for election to Congress in 1910, 1912, and 1914. He finally prevailed in the election of 1916, and was elected as a Republican to the United States House of Representatives of the 65th, 66th and 67th United States Congresses, serving from March 4, 1917, to March 3, 1923. He served as Chairman of the Committee on Industrial Arts and Expositions in the 66th and 67th Congresses. He was an unsuccessful candidate for reelection in 1922 to the 68th United States Congress.

== Federal judicial service ==
Bland was nominated by President Warren G. Harding on March 2, 1923, to an Associate Judge seat on the United States Court of Customs Appeals (United States Court of Customs and Patent Appeals from March 2, 1929) vacated by Associate Judge Marion De Vries. He was confirmed by the United States Senate on March 3, 1923, and received his commission the same day. His service terminated on December 1, 1947, due to his retirement.

== Later career and death ==
Following his retirement from the federal bench, Bland resumed the private practice of law in Washington, D.C., where he died August 3, 1951, at the age of 73. He was interred in Fort Lincoln Cemetery in Washington, D.C.

== Sources ==
- United States Congress. "Oscar E. Bland (id: B000542)". Biographical Directory of the United States Congress.
- "Bland, Oscar Edward - Federal Judicial Center". www.fjc.gov.

U.S. House of Representatives
Preceded by William A. Cullop	Member of the United States House of Representatives from Indiana's 2nd congressional district 1917–1923	Succeeded by Arthur H. Greenwood
Preceded by J. Campbell Cantrill	Chairman of the House Industrial Expositions Committee; 1919–1923	Succeeded by Daniel A. Reed
Legal offices
Preceded by Marion De Vries	Associate Judge of the United States Court of Customs and Patent Appeals; 1923–1947	Succeeded by Noble J. Johnson
