= Indiana's 2nd congressional district =

U.S. House district for Indiana

Coordinates: 41°30′N 86°0′W

- Interactive map of district boundaries since January 3, 2023
- Representative: Rudy Yakym; R–Granger
- Area: 3,679 mi^{2} (9,530 km^{2})
- Distribution: 72.90% urban; 27.10% rural
- Population (2025): 748,236
- Median household income: $70,380
- Ethnicity: 75.9% White; 11.3% Hispanic; 6.6% Black; 4.0% Two or more races; 1.5% Asian; 0.7% other
- Cook PVI: R+13

Indiana's 2nd congressional district is an electoral district for the U.S. Congress in Northern Indiana. It includes South Bend, Elkhart, and Warsaw.

Prior to 2002, the 2nd congressional district covered east central Indiana, including most of the territory now in the 6th district. However, following the 2000 U.S. census redistricting, the district was moved to replace most of what had been the 3rd district.

On November 8, 2022, Republican candidate Rudy Yakym won both the general election and the special election to complete the rest of incumbent representative Jackie Walorski's term after Walorski died in a car accident August 3, 2022.

== Recent election results from statewide races ==
| Year | Office | Results |
|---|---|---|
| 2008 | President | McCain 50% - 48% |
| 2012 | President | Romney 58% - 42% |
| 2012 | Senate | Donnelly 48% - 47% |
| 2012 | Governor | Pence 52% - 45% |
| 2016 | President | Trump 59% - 34% |
| 2016 | Senate | Young 54% - 40% |
| 2016 | Governor | Holcomb 55% - 42% |
| 2016 | Attorney General | Hill 68% - 32% |
| 2018 | Senate | Braun 52% - 44% |
| 2020 | President | Trump 60% - 38% |
| 2020 | Governor | Holcomb 59% - 30% |
| 2020 | Attorney General | Rokita 62% - 38% |
| 2022 | Senate | Young 65% - 32% |
| 2022 | Treasurer | Elliott 66% - 34% |
| 2022 | Auditor | Klutz 65% - 32% |
| 2022 | Secretary of State | Morales 61% - 35% |
| 2024 | President | Trump 62% - 36% |
| 2024 | Senate | Banks 63% - 35% |
| 2024 | Governor | Braun 58% - 37% |
| 2024 | Attorney General | Rokita 63% - 37% |

== Composition ==
For the 118th and successive Congresses (based on redistricting following the 2020 census), the district contains all or portions of the following counties and townships:

Cass County (9)

Adams, Bethlehem, Clay, Deer Creek (part; also 4th), Harrison, Jackson, Miami, Tipton, Washington (part; also 4th)

Elkhart County (16)

All 16 townships

Fulton County (8)

All eight townships

Kosciusko County (14)

Clay, Etna, Franklin, Harrison, Jackson, Jefferson, Lake, Monroe, Plain, Prairie, Scott, Seward, Van Buren, Wayne (part, also 3rd; includes Warsaw and Winona Lake)

LaPorte County (16)

Cass, Center (part, also 1st; includes part of La Porte), Clinton, Dewey, Galena, Hanna, Hudson, Johnson, Kankakee, Lincoln, Noble, Pleasant, Prairie, Union, Washington, Wills

Marshall County (10)

All 10 townships

Miami County (14)

All 14 townships

Pulaski County (12)

All 12 townships

St. Joseph County (13)

All 13 townships

Starke County (9)

All nine townships

Wabash County (7)

All seven townships

== List of members representing the district ==
| Member | Party | Years | Cong ress | Electoral history | Location |
|---|---|---|---|---|---|
District created March 4, 1823
| Jonathan Jennings (Charlestown) | Democratic- Republican | March 4, 1823 – March 3, 1825 | 18th 19th 20th 21st | Redistricted from the at-large district and re-elected in 1822. Re-elected in 1824. Re-elected in 1826. Re-elected in 1828. Lost re-election. | 1823–1833; Bartholomew, Clark, Crawford, Floyd, Harrison, Jackson, Jefferson, Jennings, Marion, Scott, Shelby, and Washington counties |
| Jonathan Jennings (Charlestown) | Anti- Jacksonian | March 4, 1825 – March 3, 1831 | 18th 19th 20th 21st | Redistricted from the at-large district and re-elected in 1822. Re-elected in 1824. Re-elected in 1826. Re-elected in 1828. Lost re-election. | 1823–1833; Bartholomew, Clark, Crawford, Floyd, Harrison, Jackson, Jefferson, Jennings, Marion, Scott, Shelby, and Washington counties |
| John Carr (Charlestown) | Jacksonian | March 4, 1831 – March 3, 1833 | 22nd | Elected in 1831. Redistricted to the 3rd district. | 1823–1833; Bartholomew, Clark, Crawford, Floyd, Harrison, Jackson, Jefferson, Jennings, Marion, Scott, Shelby, and Washington counties |
| John Ewing (Vincennes) | Anti- Jacksonian | March 4, 1833 – March 3, 1835 | 23rd | Elected in 1833. Lost re-election. | 1833–1843 [data missing] |
| John W. Davis (Carlisle) | Jacksonian | March 4, 1835 – March 3, 1837 | 24th | Elected in 1835. Retired. | 1833–1843 [data missing] |
| John Ewing (Vincennes) | Whig | March 4, 1837 – March 3, 1839 | 25th | Elected in 1837. Lost re-election. | 1833–1843 [data missing] |
| John W. Davis (Carlisle) | Democratic | March 4, 1839 – March 3, 1841 | 26th | Elected in 1839. Lost renomination. | 1833–1843 [data missing] |
| Richard W. Thompson (Bedford) | Whig | March 4, 1841 – March 3, 1843 | 27th | Elected in 1841. Retired. | 1833–1843 [data missing] |
| Thomas J. Henley (New Washington) | Democratic | March 4, 1843 – March 3, 1849 | 28th 29th 30th | Elected in 1843. Re-elected in 1845. Re-elected in 1847. Retired. | 1843–1853 [data missing] |
| Cyrus L. Dunham (Salem) | Democratic | March 4, 1849 – March 3, 1853 | 31st 32nd | Elected in 1849. Re-elected in 1851. Redistricted to the 3rd district. | 1843–1853 [data missing] |
| William H. English (Lexington) | Democratic | March 4, 1853 – March 3, 1861 | 33rd 34th 35th 36th | Elected in 1852. Re-elected in 1854. Re-elected in 1856. Re-elected in 1858. Retired. | 1853–1863 [data missing] |
| James A. Cravens (Hardinsburg) | Democratic | March 4, 1861 – March 3, 1865 | 37th 38th | Elected in 1860. Re-elected in 1862. Retired. | [data missing] |
| Michael C. Kerr (New Albany) | Democratic | March 4, 1865 – March 3, 1873 | 39th 40th 41st 42nd | Elected in 1864. Re-elected in 1866. Re-elected in 1868. Re-elected in 1870. Sought election in the at-large district and lost re-election. | [data missing] |
| Simeon K. Wolfe (New Albany) | Democratic | March 4, 1873 – March 3, 1875 | 43rd | Elected in 1872. Retired. | [data missing] |
| James D. Williams (Wheatland) | Democratic | March 4, 1875 – December 1, 1876 | 44th | Elected in 1874. Retired to run for Governor of Indiana and resigned when elected. | [data missing] |
| Vacant | | December 1, 1876 – December 5, 1876 | 44th | | [data missing] |
| Andrew Humphreys (Linton) | Democratic | December 5, 1876 – March 3, 1877 | 44th | Elected to finish Williams's term. Was not candidate for full term. | [data missing] |
| Thomas R. Cobb (Vincennes) | Democratic | March 4, 1877 – March 3, 1887 | 45th 46th 47th 48th 49th | Elected in 1876. Re-elected in 1878. Re-elected in 1880. Re-elected in 1882. Re-elected in 1884. Retired. | [data missing] |
| John H. O'Neall (Washington) | Democratic | March 4, 1887 – March 3, 1891 | 50th 51st | Elected in 1886. Re-elected in 1888. Retired. | [data missing] |
| John L. Bretz (Jasper) | Democratic | March 4, 1891 – March 3, 1895 | 52nd 53rd | Elected in 1890. Re-elected in 1892. Lost re-election. | [data missing] |
| Alexander M. Hardy (Washington) | Republican | March 4, 1895 – March 3, 1897 | 54th | Elected in 1894. Lost re-election. | [data missing] |
| Robert W. Miers (Bloomington) | Democratic | March 4, 1897 – March 3, 1905 | 55th 56th 57th 58th | Elected in 1896. Re-elected in 1898. Re-elected in 1900. Re-elected in 1902. Lost re-election. | [data missing] |
| John C. Chaney (Sullivan) | Republican | March 4, 1905 – March 3, 1909 | 59th 60th | Elected in 1904. Re-elected in 1906. Lost re-election. | [data missing] |
| William A. Cullop (Vincennes) | Democratic | March 4, 1909 – March 3, 1917 | 61st 62nd 63rd 64th | Elected in 1908. Re-elected in 1910. Re-elected in 1912. Re-elected in 1914. Lost re-election. | [data missing] |
| Oscar E. Bland (Linton) | Republican | March 4, 1917 – March 3, 1923 | 65th 66th 67th | Elected in 1916. Re-elected in 1918. Re-elected in 1920. Lost re-election. | [data missing] |
| Arthur H. Greenwood (Washington) | Democratic | March 4, 1923 – March 3, 1933 | 68th 69th 70th 71st 72nd | Elected in 1922. Re-elected in 1924. Re-elected in 1926. Re-elected in 1928. Re-elected in 1930. Redistricted to the 7th district. | [data missing] |
| George R. Durgan (Lafayette) | Democratic | March 4, 1933 – January 3, 1935 | 73rd | Elected in 1932. Lost re-election. | [data missing] |
| Vacant | | January 3, 1935 – January 29, 1935 | 74th | Member-elect Frederick Landis died November 15, 1934. | [data missing] |
| Charles A. Halleck (Rensselaer) | Republican | January 29, 1935 – January 3, 1969 | 74th 75th 76th 77th 78th 79th 80th 81st 82nd 83rd 84th 85th 86th 87th 88th 89th 90th | Elected to finish Landis's term. Re-elected in 1936. Re-elected in 1938. Re-elected in 1940. Re-elected in 1942. Re-elected in 1944. Re-elected in 1946. Re-elected in 1948. Re-elected in 1950. Re-elected in 1952. Re-elected in 1954. Re-elected in 1956. Re-elected in 1958. Re-elected in 1960. Re-elected in 1962. Re-elected in 1964. Re-elected in 1966. Retired. | [data missing] |
| Earl F. Landgrebe (Valparaiso) | Republican | January 3, 1969 – January 3, 1975 | 91st 92nd 93rd | Elected in 1968. Re-elected in 1970. Re-elected in 1972. Lost re-election. | [data missing] |
| Floyd Fithian (Lafayette) | Democratic | January 3, 1975 – January 3, 1983 | 94th 95th 96th 97th | Elected in 1974. Re-elected in 1976. Re-elected in 1978. Re-elected in 1980. Redistricted to the 7th district and retired to run for U.S. Senator. | [data missing] |
| Philip Sharp (Muncie) | Democratic | January 3, 1983 – January 3, 1995 | 98th 99th 100th 101st 102nd 103rd | Redistricted from the 10th district and re-elected in 1982. Re-elected in 1984. Re-elected in 1986. Re-elected in 1988. Re-elected in 1990. Re-elected in 1992. Retired. | [data missing] |
| David McIntosh (Muncie) | Republican | January 3, 1995 – January 3, 2001 | 104th 105th 106th | Elected in 1994. Re-elected in 1996. Re-elected in 1998. Retired to run for Governor of Indiana. | [data missing] |
| Mike Pence (Edinburgh) | Republican | January 3, 2001 – January 3, 2003 | 107th | Elected in 2000. Redistricted to the 6th district. | [data missing] |
| Chris Chocola (Bristol) | Republican | January 3, 2003 – January 3, 2007 | 108th 109th | Elected in 2002. Re-elected in 2004. Lost re-election. | 2003–2013 |
| Joe Donnelly (Granger) | Democratic | January 3, 2007 – January 3, 2013 | 110th 111th 112th | Elected in 2006. Re-elected in 2008. Re-elected in 2010. Retired to run for U.S. Senator. | 2003–2013 |
| Jackie Walorski (Elkhart) | Republican | January 3, 2013 – August 3, 2022 | 113th 114th 115th 116th 117th | Elected in 2012. Re-elected in 2014. Re-elected in 2016. Re-elected in 2018. Re-elected in 2020. Ran for re-election, but died. | 2013–2023 |
| Vacant | | August 3, 2022 – November 14, 2022 | 117th | | 2013–2023 |
| Rudy Yakym (Granger) | Republican | November 14, 2022 – present | 117th 118th 119th | Elected to finish Walorski's term. Elected to full term in 2022. Re-elected in 2024. Re-elected in 2026. | 2013–2023 |
| Rudy Yakym (Granger) | Republican | November 14, 2022 – present | 117th 118th 119th | Elected to finish Walorski's term. Elected to full term in 2022. Re-elected in 2024. Re-elected in 2026. | 2023–present |

== Election results ==
=== 2002 ===
Indiana's 2nd Congressional District election (2002)
| Party | Candidate | Votes | % |
|---|---|---|---|
| Republican | Chris Chocola | 95,081 | 50.45 |
| Democratic | Jill Long Thompson | 86,253 | 45.77 |
| Libertarian | Sharon Metheny | 7,112 | 3.77 |
| Total votes | | 188,446 | 100.00 |
| Turnout | | | |
| Republican hold | | | |

=== 2004 ===
Indiana's 2nd Congressional District election (2004)
| Party | Candidate | Votes | % |
|---|---|---|---|
| Republican | Chris Chocola (incumbent) | 140,496 | 54.17 |
| Democratic | Joe Donnelly | 115,513 | 44.54 |
| Libertarian | Douglas Barnes | 3,346 | 1.29 |
| Total votes | | 259,355 | 100.00 |
| Turnout | | | |
| Republican hold | | | |

=== 2006 ===
Indiana's 2nd Congressional District election (2006)
| Party | Candidate | Votes | % |
|---|---|---|---|
| Democratic | Joe Donnelly | 103,561 | 53.98 |
| Republican | Chris Chocola (incumbent) | 88,300 | 46.02 |
| Total votes | | 191,861 | 100.00 |
| Turnout | | | |
| Democratic gain from Republican | | | |

=== 2008 ===
Indiana's 2nd Congressional District election (2008)
| Party | Candidate | Votes | % |
|---|---|---|---|
| Democratic | Joe Donnelly (incumbent) | 187,416 | 67.09 |
| Republican | Luke Puckett | 84,455 | 30.23 |
| Libertarian | Mark Vogel | 7,475 | 2.68 |
| Total votes | | 279,346 | 100.00 |
| Turnout | | | |
| Democratic hold | | | |

=== 2010 ===
Indiana's 2nd Congressional District election (2010)
| Party | Candidate | Votes | % |
|---|---|---|---|
| Democratic | Joe Donnelly (incumbent) | 91,341 | 48.18 |
| Republican | Jackie Walorski | 88,803 | 46.84 |
| Libertarian | Mark Vogel | 9,447 | 4.98 |
| Total votes | | 189,591 | 100.00 |
| Turnout | | | |
| Democratic hold | | | |

=== 2012 ===
Indiana's 2nd Congressional District election (2012)
| Party | Candidate | Votes | % |
|---|---|---|---|
| Republican | Jackie Walorski | 134,033 | 49.01 |
| Democratic | Brendan Mullen | 130,113 | 47.58 |
| Libertarian | Joe Ruiz | 9,326 | 3.41 |
| Independent | Kenneth R. Lunce, Jr. | 3 | 0.00 |
| Total votes | | 273,475 | 100.00 |
| Turnout | | | 56 |
| Republican gain from Democratic | | | |

=== 2014 ===
Indiana's 2nd Congressional District election (2014)
| Party | Candidate | Votes | % |
|---|---|---|---|
| Republican | Jackie Walorski (incumbent) | 85,583 | 58.94 |
| Democratic | Joseph Gerard Bock | 55,590 | 38.29 |
| Libertarian | Jeff Petermann | 4,027 | 2.77 |
| Total votes | | 145,200 | 100.00 |
| Turnout | | | 29 |
| Republican hold | | | |

=== 2016 ===
Indiana's 2nd Congressional District election (2016)
| Party | Candidate | Votes | % |
|---|---|---|---|
| Republican | Jackie Walorski (incumbent) | 164,355 | 59.26 |
| Democratic | Lynn Coleman | 102,401 | 36.92 |
| Libertarian | Ron Cenkush | 10,601 | 3.82 |
| Total votes | | 277,357 | 100.00 |
| Turnout | | | 54 |
| Republican hold | | | |

=== 2018 ===
Indiana's 2nd Congressional District election (2018)
| Party | Candidate | Votes | % |
|---|---|---|---|
| Republican | Jackie Walorski (incumbent) | 125,499 | 54.8 |
| Democratic | Mel Hall | 103,363 | 45.2 |
| No party | Richard Wolf (Write-in) | 27 | 0.0 |
| Total votes | | 228,889 | 100.00 |
| Turnout | | | |
| Republican hold | | | |

=== 2020 ===
Indiana's 2nd congressional district, 2020
| Party | Candidate | Votes | % |
|---|---|---|---|
| Republican | Jackie Walorski (incumbent) | 183,601 | 61.5 |
| Democratic | Pat Hackett | 114,967 | 38.5 |
| Total votes | | 298,568 | 100.0 |
| Republican hold | | | |

=== 2022 ===
Indiana's 2nd congressional district special election, 2022
| Party | Candidate | Votes | % |
|---|---|---|---|
| Republican | Rudy Yakym | 118,997 | 63.3 |
| Democratic | Paul Steury | 62,792 | 33.4 |
| Libertarian | William Henry | 6,101 | 3.2 |
| Write-in | Marla Godette | 143 | 0.1 |
| Total votes | | 188,033 | 100.0 |
| Republican hold | | | |

Indiana's 2nd congressional district, 2022
| Party | Candidate | Votes | % |
|---|---|---|---|
| Republican | Rudy Yakym | 125,222 | 64.6 |
| Democratic | Paul Steury | 62,726 | 32.4 |
| Libertarian | William Henry | 5,782 | 3.0 |
| Total votes | | 193,730 | 100.0 |
| Republican hold | | | |

=== 2024 ===
Indiana's 2nd congressional district, 2024
| Party | Candidate | Votes | % |
|---|---|---|---|
| Republican | Rudy Yakym | 172,467 | 62.7 |
| Democratic | Lori Camp | 101,962 | 34.4 |
| Libertarian | William Henry | 7,795 | 2.6 |
| Total votes | | 261,027 | 99.9 |
| Republican hold | | | |

== See also ==
- Indiana's congressional districts
- List of United States congressional districts
