= Philip Sharp (politician) =

American politician

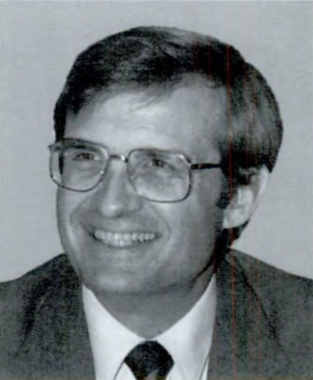

Member of the U.S. House of Representatives from Indiana
- In office January 3, 1975 – January 3, 1995
- Preceded by: David W. Dennis
- Succeeded by: David McIntosh
- Constituency: 10th district (1975–1983); 2nd district (1983–1995)

Personal details
- Born: Philip Riley Sharp; July 15, 1942 (age 84) Baltimore, Maryland, U.S.
- Party: Democratic
- Education: DePauw University; Georgetown University (BA, MA, PhD); Exeter College, Oxford

Philip Riley Sharp (born July 15, 1942) is an American politician and nonprofit executive who served ten terms in the United States House of Representatives as a Democratic representative from Indiana from 1975 to 1995.

In his 1988 and 1990 congressional elections, Sharp defeated future U.S. Vice President Mike Pence.

== Early life and education ==
Sharp was born in Baltimore, Maryland, in 1942. He grew up in Elwood, Indiana. After graduating as a valedictorian from Wendell Willkie High School in 1960, he attended DePauw University in 1961. He then transferred and graduated cum laude from the Edmund A. Walsh School of Foreign Service at Georgetown University in 1964.

In 1966, he enrolled in graduate courses at Exeter College, Oxford University in 1966 before returning to Georgetown University to earn his Ph.D. in 1974. Between 1967 and in 1974, he taught political science as an assistant professor, and later associate professor, at Ball State University.

== Career ==
Between 1964 and 1969, he served as a Legislative Aide to Democratic senator Vance Hartke. His first attempts at elected office came in 1970 and 1972, when he was the Democratic candidate for Indiana's 10th congressional district.

=== Tenure in Congress ===
In 1974, Sharp was elected to the House of Representatives as part of the "Watergate Babies" cohort, 47 new Democrats elected in the aftermath of the scandals that drove President Richard Nixon from office.

During his years in Congress, Sharp participated in the passage of major energy legislation. As chairman of the Energy and Power Subcommittee, he played key roles in the 1990 Clean Air Act Amendments and the 1992 Energy Policy Act. He was a member of the National Research Council Committee on Effectiveness and Impact of Corporate Average Fuel Economy (CAFE) Standards, which issued its major report in 2001. He also chaired the Secretary of Energy's Electric Systems Reliability Task Force, which issued its major report in 1998.

Sharp chose not to seek re-election in the 1994 elections, and was succeeded by Republican David M. McIntosh.

== Later years ==
Sharp went on to serve as director of the Institute of Politics at Harvard University's John F. Kennedy School of Government. In 2005, he became president of the nonpartisan think tank Resources for the Future in Washington, D.C.

Sharp also served on the board of directors of the Duke Energy Corporation, as vice chair on the board of the Energy Foundation, and as chair of board of ecoAmerica. He is the congressional chair for the National Commission on Energy Policy, is a member of The National Academies’ Committee on America's Climate Choices and the Blue Ribbon Commission on America's Nuclear Future. Before joining RFF, Sharp was senior policy advisor of the Washington, D.C.–based law and public policy firm Van Ness Feldman.

== Honors ==
Sharp received honorary degrees from DePauw University in 1986 and Ball State University in 1997. For his work on energy issues while in Congress, Sharp became in 2016 the second recipient of the James R. Schlesinger Medal for Energy Security, an honor given by the U.S. Department of Energy.

U.S. House of Representatives
Preceded by David W. Dennis	Member of the U.S. House of Representatives from Indiana's 10th congressional district 1975–1983	Succeeded by Andrew Jacobs Jr.
Preceded by Floyd Fithian	Member of the U.S. House of Representatives from Indiana's 2nd congressional district 1983–1995	Succeeded by David McIntosh
U.S. order of precedence (ceremonial)
Preceded by Jim McCrery as Former U.S. Representative	Order of precedence of the United States as Former U.S. Representative	Succeeded by Don Manzullo as Former U.S. Representative
