= Vesta, Nebraska =

- Unincorporated community
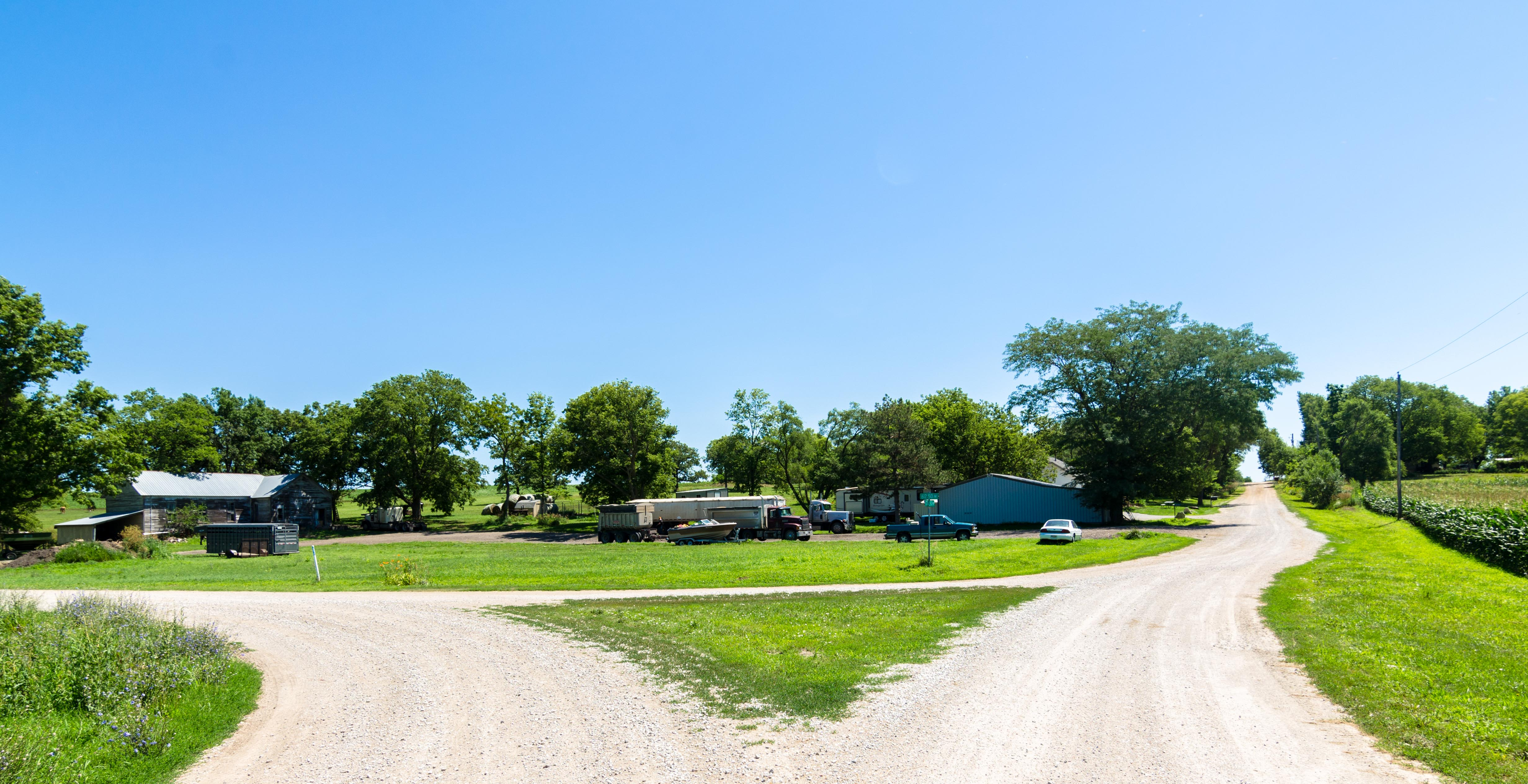
- Gravel Streets in Vesta

- Location within the state of Nebraska
- Coordinates: 40°21′23″N 96°20′15″W
- Country: United States
- State: Nebraska
- County: Johnson
- Elevation: 1,230 ft (370 m)
- Time zone: UTC-6 (Central (CST))
  - Summer (DST): UTC-5 (CDT)
- ZIP code: 68380
- FIPS code: 31-50600
- GNIS feature ID: 834377

Vesta is an unincorporated community in Johnson County, Nebraska, United States.

== History ==
A schoolteacher named Vesta after a former student in Massachusetts.
