= Thomas R. Cobb =

American politician

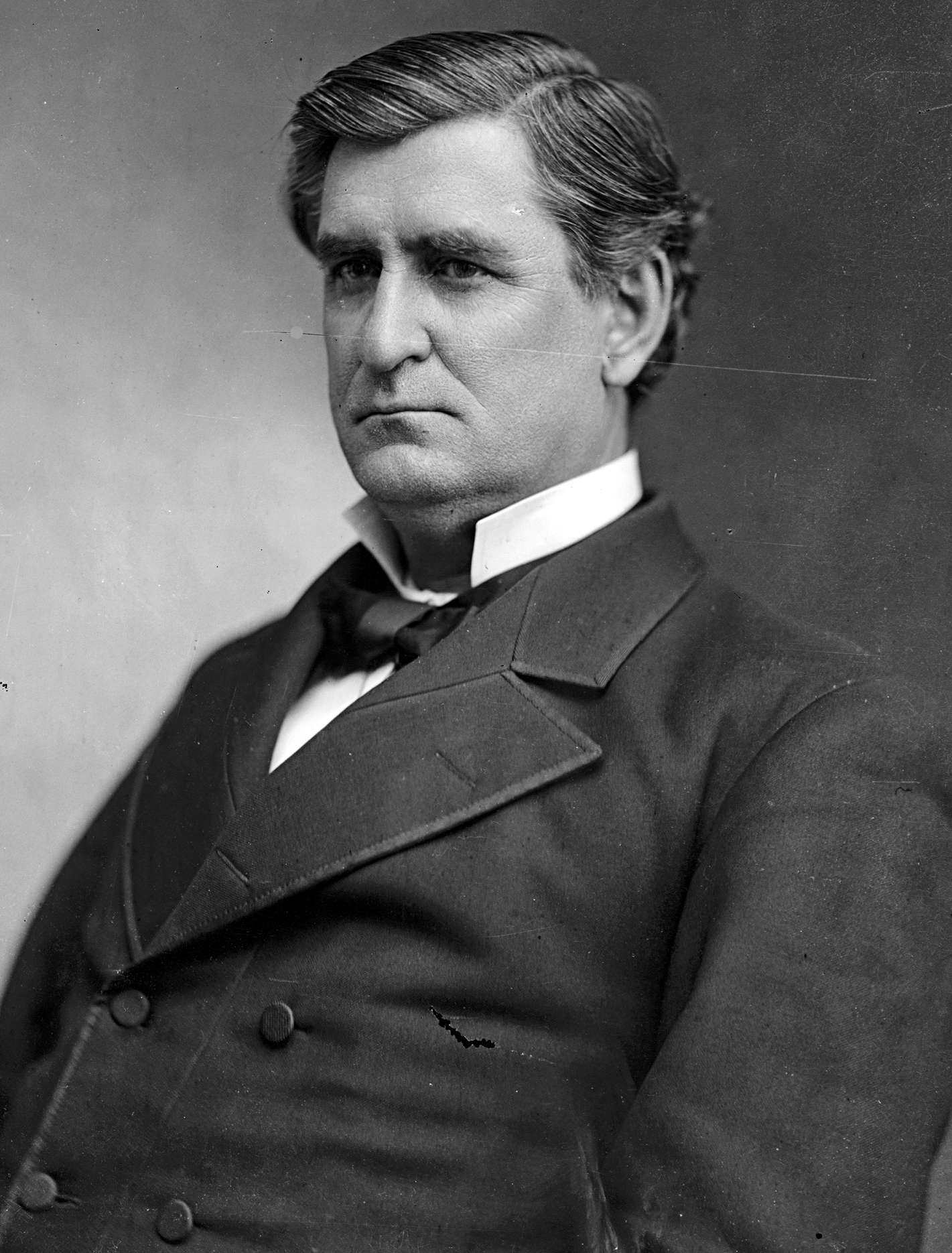

Member of the U.S. House of Representatives from Indiana's 2nd district
- In office March 4, 1877 – March 3, 1887
- Preceded by: Andrew Humphreys
- Succeeded by: John H. O'Neall

Personal details
- Born: Thomas Reed Cobb; July 2, 1828 Springville, Lawrence County, Indiana, U.S.
- Died: June 23, 1892 (aged 63) Vincennes, Indiana, U.S.
- Resting place: Old Vincennes Cemetery
- Party: Democratic
- Education: Indiana University Bloomington

Thomas Reed Cobb (July 2, 1828 – June 23, 1892) was an American lawyer and politician who served five terms as a U.S. representative from Indiana from 1877 to 1887.

== Biography ==
Born in Springville, Lawrence County, Indiana, Cobb attended Indiana University Bloomington. He studied law. He was admitted to the bar in 1851 and commenced practice in Bedford, Indiana. He was commissioned as major of the Indiana Militia in 1852. He moved to Vincennes, Indiana, in 1867. He served as member of the State senate from 1858 until 1866 and as president of the Democratic State convention in 1876. He served as delegate to the Democratic National Convention in 1876.

=== Congress ===
Cobb was elected as a Democrat to the Forty-fifth and to the four succeeding Congresses (March 4, 1877 – March 3, 1887). He served as chairman of the Committee on Mileage (Forty-fifth and Forty-sixth Congresses), Committee on Public Lands (Forty-eighth and Forty-ninth Congresses). He was not a candidate for renomination in 1886.

=== Later career and death ===
He resumed the practice of law and also engaged in agricultural pursuits. He died in Vincennes, Indiana, June 23, 1892. He was interred in Old Vincennes Cemetery.

U.S. House of Representatives
Preceded by Andrew Humphreys	Member of the U.S. House of Representatives from Indiana's 2nd congressional district 1877-1887	Succeeded by John H. O'Neall
