= John C. Chaney =

American politician from Indiana

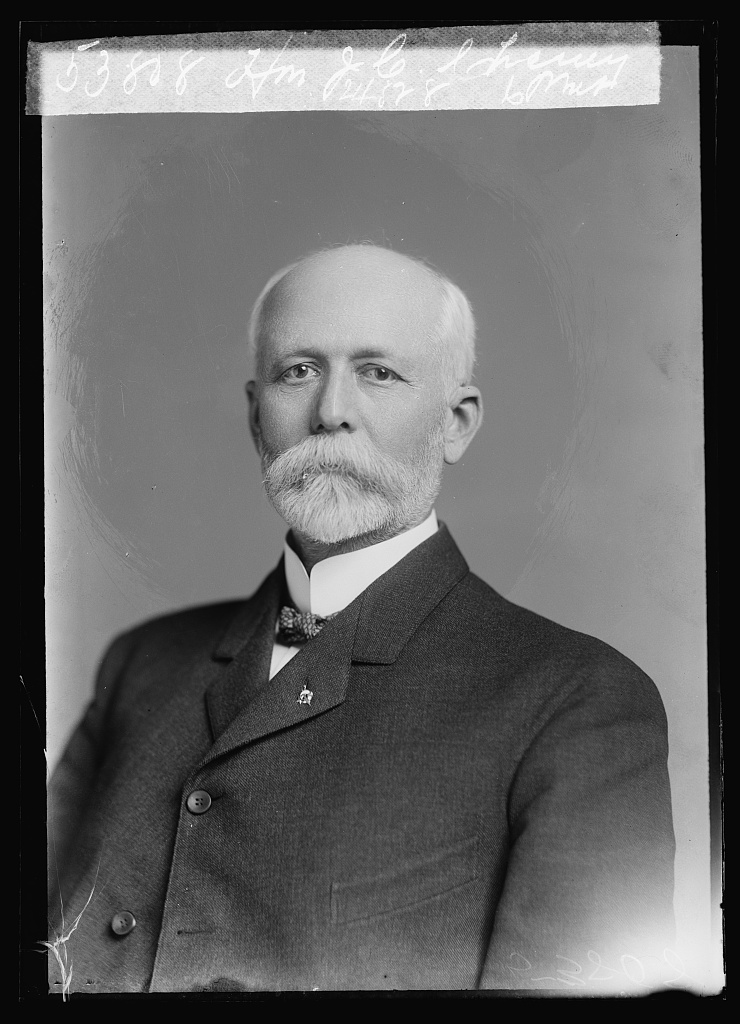
- Chaney photographed by C. M. Bell Studio
- Born: John Crawford Chaney; February 1, 1853; Lisbon, Ohio, US
- Died: April 26, 1940 (aged 87); Sullivan, Indiana, US
- Resting place: Center Ridge Cemetery; 39.0929°N 87.4214°W
- Education: Law Degree from Cincinnati University (1882)
- Occupation: Lawyer
- Known for: US Representative
- Political party: Republican

John Crawford Chaney (February 1, 1853 – April 26, 1940) was an American lawyer and politician who served two terms as a U.S. representative from Indiana from 1905 to 1909.

== Early life ==
Chaney was born near Lisbon, Ohio in 1854, and later moved to Lafayette Township, Indiana, with his parents, who settled on a farm near Fort Wayne. He attended the common schools, graduating first from Ascension Seminary, Farmersburg, Indiana, in 1874 and later from the Terre Haute Commercial College.

He taught school and served as superintendent of schools for five years before graduating from the law school of Cincinnati University in June 1882.

== Career ==
Chaney was admitted to the bar in 1883 and commenced practice in Sullivan, Indiana. He served as a member of the state central committee from the second district in 1884 and 1885. In July 1889, he was appointed by President Harrison as assistant to the Attorney General in the Department of Justice, serving in that position until August 1893, when he resigned and resumed the practice of law.

Chaney was elected as a Republican to the Fifty-ninth and Sixtieth Congresses (March 4, 1905 – March 3, 1909) for Indiana's 2nd congressional district. He was an unsuccessful candidate for reelection in 1908 to the Sixty-first Congress.

After leaving the House, he continued the practice of law in Sullivan, Indiana.

== Personal life ==
Chaney died on April 26, 1940, in Sullivan, Indiana. He was interred in Center Ridge Cemetery.

U.S. House of Representatives
Preceded by Robert W. Miers	Representative; Indiana's 2nd congressional district Fifty-ninth and Sixtieth Congresses; 1905 – 1909	Succeeded by William A. Cullop
