= David W. Dennis =

American politician

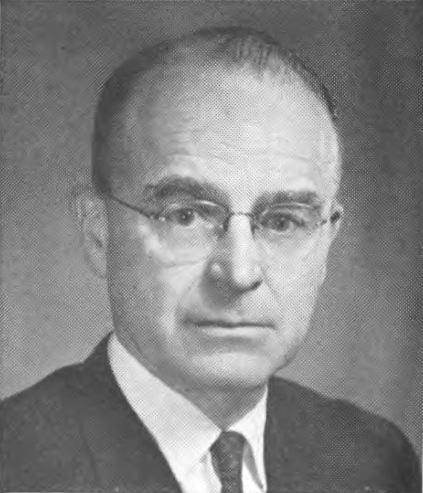

Member of the U.S. House of Representatives from Indiana's 10th district
- In office January 3, 1969 – January 3, 1975
- Preceded by: Constituency Established
- Succeeded by: Philip R. Sharp

Member of the Indiana House of Representatives from Wayne County and Union County

Member of the Indiana House of Representatives from Indiana
- In office November 5, 1952 – November 5, 1958
- Preceded by: Multi-member district
- Succeeded by: Multi-member district

Member of the Indiana House of Representatives from Wayne County
- In office November 6, 1946 – November 3, 1948
- Preceded by: Multi-member district
- Succeeded by: Multi-member district

Personal details
- Born: David Worth Dennis II; June 7, 1912 Washington, D.C., U.S.
- Died: January 6, 1999 (aged 86) Richmond, Indiana, U.S.
- Party: Republican

David Worth Dennis II (June 7, 1912 – January 6, 1999) was an American attorney and Republican United States Representative from Indiana from 1969 to 1975.

== Early life and education ==
He was born in Washington, D.C., and was named for his grandfather, David Worth Dennis who had been a professor at Earlham College in Richmond, Indiana. His father, William Cullen Dennis was president of Earlham College. He graduated from Sidwell Friends School in 1929 and earned an A.B. degree from Earlham College in 1933. He also received an LL.B. (now J.D.) from Harvard Law School in 1936. He was admitted to the bar in 1935 and commenced practice in Richmond, Indiana in 1936.

== Political career ==
Dennis served as the prosecuting attorney for Wayne County, Indiana from 1939 to 1943. He enlisted in the United States Army and served from 1944 to 1946. He was commissioned a first lieutenant, JAG department, and served in the Pacific Theater. He was elected state representative from Wayne County to the Indiana General Assembly and served 1947–1949. He was also a joint State representative from Wayne and Union Counties from 1953 to 1959.

=== Congress ===
He was elected as a Republican to the Ninety-first Congress and reelected twice (January 3, 1969 – January 3, 1975). Dennis was a staunch defender of President Richard M. Nixon during the Watergate scandal. As a member of the House Judiciary Committee, Dennis was in the minority voting to oppose impeachment of the president in 1974. However, when the "smoking gun" tape was released, Dennis said he would vote to impeach for obstruction of justice, as did all nine Republicans on the committee who had previously opposed impeachment. Dennis said that Nixon "destroyed his credibility" by withholding the tape for so long.

He was defeated for reelection that same year by Democrat Phil Sharp.

=== Later career and death ===
He resumed the practice of law until his death in Richmond in 1999.

U.S. House of Representatives
Preceded by Richard L. Roudebush	Member of the U.S. House of Representatives from Indiana's 10th congressional district 1969 – 1975	Succeeded by Phillip R. Sharp
