= Smoke ring (disambiguation) =

A smoke ring is a visible vortex ring formed by smoke in a clear atmosphere.

Smoke ring(s) may also refer to:

== Music ==
- Smoke Rings (album), a compilation of Swing-era recordings, from Victor Records, 1944

=== Bands ===
- The Smoke Ring (band), a 1960s American rock group

=== Songs ===
- "Smoke Rings", a song by Gene Gifford and Ned Washington that was the theme of the Casa Loma Orchestra, 1932
- "Smoke Rings", a 1973 song by David Wiffen off the album Coast to Coast Fever
- "Smoke Rings", a 1986 song and single by Laurie Anderson from the soundtrack for the movie Home of the Brave
- "Smoke Rings", a 1987 single by SLAB!
- "Smoke RingS", a 1989 song by Winter Hours (band)
- "Smoke Rings", a song by Hurricane #1, a B-side of the single "Step into My World", 1997
- "Smoke Rings", a song by k.d. lang from Drag, 1997
- "Smoke Rings", a song by Photek from Modus Operandi, 1997
- "Smoke Rings", a 2004 song by Ian Broudie off the album Tales Told
- "Smokerings", a 1988 song by Screaming Trees off the album Invisible Lantern

== People, animals, figures, characters ==
- Leif Anderson or "Smoke Rings" (1925–1999), Swedish radio presenter
- Smoke Ring, a racehorse, winner of the 1965 Great Northern Steeplechase

== Literature ==
- The Smoke Ring (novel), by Larry Niven, 1987
- Smoke Ring. The Politics of Tobacco, a 1985 book by Peter Taylor (journalist)

== Other uses ==
- Smoke ring (cooking), in barbecue, a characteristic of some smoked meats
- Newmarket Smoke Rings, Newmarket, Ontario, Canada; former name of the Newmarket Hurricanes junior-A ice hockey team
- "Smoke Rings", a 1922 stage revue written by Wal Pink

== See also ==
- "Rings of Smoke", Pat Rooney's Vaudeville act, starring Jill Rainsford
- "Rings of Smoke", a short story by Stan Ageira
- Smoke (disambiguation)
- Ring (disambiguation)
