= List of short-story authors =

This is a list of published short-story authors.

== A–B ==
- Sait Faik Abasıyanık (1906–1954)
- Mazhar Abro (born 1971)
- Chinua Achebe (1930–2013)
- Mirza Adeeb (1914–1999)
- Pilar Adón (born 1971)
- Stan Ageira (born 1961)
- Ama Ata Aidoo (1940–2023)
- Ryūnosuke Akutagawa (1892–1927)
- Sholem Aleichem (1859–1916)
- Sherman Alexie (born 1966)
- Syed Mujtaba Ali (1904–1974)
- Steve Almond (born 1966)
- Martin Amis (1949–2023)
- Poul Anderson (1926–2001)
- Sherwood Anderson (1876–1941)
- Leonid Andreyev (1871–1919)
- Núria Añó (born 1973)
- Jacob M. Appel (born 1973)
- Max Apple (born 1941)
- Helena Araújo Ortiz (1934–2015)
- Isaac Asimov (1920–1992)
- Michael "Atters" Attree (born 1965)
- Margaret Atwood (born 1939)
- Isaac Babel (1894–1940)
- Latifa Baka (born 1964)
- Julia K. Wetherill Baker (1858–1931)
- Manik Bandopadhyay (1908–1956)
- Tarasankar Bandyopadhyay (1898–1971)
- Christine Barkhuizen le Roux (1959–2020)
- José Baroja (born 1983)
- Andrea Barrett (born 1964)
- Lynne Barrett (born 1950)
- John Barth (1930–2024)
- Donald Barthelme (1931–1989)
- Subimal Basak (born 1939)
- Charles Baxter (born 1947)
- Ann Beattie (born 1947)
- Elizabeth Whitfield Croom Bellamy (1837–1900)
- Pinckney Benedict (born 1964)
- Aimee Bender (born 1969)
- Abdelmajid Benjelloun (1919–1981)
- Arnold Bennett (1867–1931)
- Stefano Benni (1947–2025)
- Mohammed Berrada (born 1938)
- Wendell Berry (born 1934)
- Eva Best (1851–1925)
- Ambrose Bierce (1842–c. 1914)
- Jennie M. Bingham (1859–1933)
- Michael Bishop (1945–2023)
- Terry Bisson (1942–2024)
- Korban Blake
- Robert Bloch (1917–1994)
- Annie R. Blount (1839–unknown)
- Ruskin Bond (born 1934)
- Leslie Bonnet (1902–1985)
- Jorge Luis Borges (1899–1986)
- Ahmed Bouzfour (born 1945)
- Ben Bova (1932–2020)
- T. C. Boyle (born 1948)
- Leigh Brackett (1915–1978)
- Ray Bradbury (1920–2012)
- Richard Brautigan (1935–1984)
- Radovan Brenkus (born 1974)
- Maeve Brennan (1917–1993)
- Besmilr Brigham (1913–2000)
- Kevin Brockmeier (born 1974)
- Fredric Brown (1906–1972)
- Mary K. Buck (1849–1901)
- Lois McMaster Bujold (born 1949)
- Charles Bukowski (1920–1994)
- Ivan Bunin (1870–1953)
- Robert Olen Butler (born 1945)
- Dino Buzzati (1906–1972)

== C–D ==
- Morley Callaghan (1903–1990)
- Italo Calvino (1923–1985)
- Ramsey Campbell (born 1946)
- Albert Camus (1913–1960)
- Kevin Canty (born 1953)
- Ron Carlson (born 1947)
- Angela Carter (1940–1992)
- Raymond Carver (1938–1988)
- Michael Chabon (born 1963)
- Dan Chaon (born 1964)
- Katharine Hopkins Chapman (1870/72/73–1930)
- Faustin Charles (born 1944)
- Sarat Chandra Chattopadhyay (1876–1938)
- John Cheever (1912–1982)
- Anton Chekhov (1860–1904)
- Ted Chiang (born 1967)
- Emelie C. S. Chilton (1838–1864)
- Kate Chopin (1850–1904)
- Malay Roy Choudhury (1939–2023)
- Mohamed Choukri (1935–2003)
- Agatha Christie (1890–1976)
- Felicia Buttz Clark (1862–1931)
- Brian Cleeve (1921–2003)
- Wanda Coleman (1946–2013)
- John Collier (1901–1980)
- Aaron Cometbus (born 1968)
- Richard Connell (1893–1949)
- Frank Conroy (1936–2005)
- Carolyn Cooke (born 1964)
- J. California Cooper (1931–2014)
- Robert Coover (1932–2024)
- Julio Cortázar (1914–1984)
- Cola Barr Craig (1861–1930)
- Stephen Crane (1871–1900)
- A. J. Cronin (1896–1981)
- Catherine Crowe (1800–1876)
- Anne Virginia Culbertson (1857–1918)
- Roald Dahl (1916–1990)
- Edwidge Danticat (born 1969)
- Manoj Das (1934–2021)
- Avram Davidson (1923–1993)
- Peter Ho Davies (born 1966)
- Amparo Dávila (1928–2020)
- Lydia Davis (born 1947)
- Nalini Prava Deka (1944–2014)
- Leoncio P. Deriada (1938–2019)
- Tibor Déry (1894–1977)
- Paul Di Filippo (born 1954)
- Junot Díaz (born 1968)
- Philip K. Dick (1928–1982)
- Isak Dinesen (1885–1962)
- Chitra Banerjee Divakaruni (born 1956)
- Arthur Conan Doyle (1859–1930)
- Andre Dubus (1936–1999)
- Guadalupe Dueñas (1910–2002)
- Andy Duncan (born 1964)
- Stuart Dybek (born 1942)

== E–F ==
- C. M. Eddy, Jr. (1896–1967)
- Dave Eggers (born 1970)
- Deborah Eisenberg (born 1945)
- Youssouf Amine Elalamy (born 1961)
- Harlan Ellison (1934–2018)
- Louise Erdrich (born 1954)
- Ana Estrella Santos (born 20th century)
- Jeffrey Eugenides (born 1960)
- F. Scott Fitzgerald (1896–1940)
- Rubem Fonseca (1925–2020)
- John M. Ford (1957–2006)
- Richard Ford (born 1944)
- Thelma Forshaw (1923–1995)
- Eugie Foster (born 1971)
- Janet Frame (1924–2004)
- Golda Fried (born 1972)
- Jacques Futrelle (1875–1912)

== G–H ==
- Neil Gaiman (born 1960)
- Mary Gaitskill (born 1954)
- Aleksandra Gajewska (born 1971)
- Stephen Gallagher (born 1954)
- Mavis Gallant (1922–2014)
- Paul Gallico (1897–1976)
- John Galt (1779–1839)
- Gabriel García Márquez (1928–2014)
- Helen Garner (born 1942)
- William H. Gass (1924–2017)
- Tim Gautreaux (born 1947)
- Eleanor Churchill Gibbs (1840–1925)
- William Gibson (born 1948)
- Abelard Giza (born 1980)
- Nikolai Gogol (1809–1852)
- Nadine Gordimer (1923–2014)
- Elizabeth Graver (born 1964)
- Ben K. Green (1912–1974)
- Frances Nimmo Greene (1867–1937)
- Graham Greene (1904–1991)
- Davis Grubb (1919–1980)
- Richard Guest (born 1967)
- Aaron Gwyn (born 1972)
- Hubert Haddad (born 1947)
- Per Hallström (1866–1960)
- Edmond Hamilton (1904–1977)
- Barry Hannah (1942–2010)
- Ethel Hillyer Harris (1859–1931)
- Bret Harte (1836–1902)
- Peter Härtling (1933–2017)
- Nathaniel Hawthorne (1804–1864)
- Victor Heck (born 1967)
- Robert A. Heinlein, (1907–1988)
- Ernest Hemingway (1899–1961)
- Amy Hempel (born 1951)
- O. Henry (1862–1910)
- Hans Herbjørnsrud (1938–2023)
- Patricia Highsmith (1921–1995)
- Tobias Hill (born 1970)
- E. T. A. Hoffmann (1776–1822)
- Hugh Hood (1928–2000)
- Rhys Hughes (born 1966)
- Zora Neale Hurston (1891–1960)
- Aamer Hussein (born 1955)
- Aldous Huxley (1894–1963)
- Hwang Sun-wŏn (1915–2000)

== I–J ==
- Yusuf Idris (1927–1991)
- Washington Irving (1783–1859)
- Fríða Ísberg (born 1992)
- Mazhar ul Islam (born 1949)
- Shirley Jackson (1916–1965)
- M. R. James (1862–1936)
- Barbara Jenkins (born 1941)
- Sarah Orne Jewett (1849–1909)
- Denis Johnson (1949–2017)
- Electa Amanda Wright Johnson (1938–1929)
- Edward P. Jones (born 1951)
- Thom Jones (1945–2016)
- James Joyce (1882–1941)

== K–L ==
- Franz Kafka (1883–1924)
- Wladimir Kaminer (born 1967)
- Driss El Khouri (1939–2022)
- Stephen King (born 1947)
- Rudyard Kipling (1865–1936)
- Phil Klay (born 1983)
- Heinrich von Kleist (1777–1811)
- R. A. Lafferty (1914–2002)
- Jhumpa Lahiri (born 1967)
- Lori L. Lake (born 1960)
- Geoffrey A. Landis (born 1955)
- Helen Langworthy (1899–1991)
- Joe R. Lansdale (born 1951)
- Ring Lardner (1885–1933)
- D. H. Lawrence (1885–1930)
- Henry Lawson (1867–1922)
- Ursula K. Le Guin (1929–2018)
- Murray Leinster (1896–1975)
- Doris Lessing (1919–2013)
- Primo Levi (1919–1987)
- Robert Levin (born 1939)
- Norman Levine (1923–2005)
- William Levy (1939–2019)
- Thomas Ligotti (born 1951)
- Tao Lin (born 1983)
- Kelly Link (born 1969)
- Jack London (1876–1916)
- Luis López Nieves (born 1950)
- H. P. Lovecraft (1890–1937)
- Earl Lovelace (born 1935)
- Fitz Hugh Ludlow (1836–1870)
- Anne Bozeman Lyon (1860–1936)

== M–N ==
- Darko Macan (born 1966)
- John D. MacDonald (1916–1986)
- Della Campbell MacLeod (ca. 1884 – ?)
- Ian R. MacLeod (born 1956)
- Naguib Mahfouz (1911–2006)
- Jennifer Nansubuga Makumbi (born 1967)
- Bernard Malamud (1914–1986)
- Barry N. Malzberg (1939–2024)
- Andreas Mand (born 1959)
- Katherine Mansfield (1888–1923)
- Valerie Martin (born 1948)
- Bobbie Ann Mason (born 1942)
- W. Somerset Maugham (1874–1965)
- Guy de Maupassant (1850–1893)
- Julian May (1931–2017)
- Cormac McCarthy (1933–2023)
- Angel Leigh McCoy (born 1962)
- Annie Virginia McCracken (1868–1892?)
- John McGahern (1934–2006)
- Thomas McGuane (born 1939)
- Florence Percy McIntyre (1852–1923)
- Reginald McKnight (born 1956)
- Georgie A. Hulse McLeod (1827–1890)
- Herman Melville (1819–1891)
- Holdemar Menezes (1921–1996)
- William Michaelian (born 1956)
- Steven Millhauser (born 1943)
- Marijane Minaberri (1926–2017)
- Edward Page Mitchell (1852–1927)
- Lorrie Moore (born 1957)
- Mary McGarry Morris (born 1943)
- Honoré Willsie Morrow (1880–1940)
- Bharati Mukherjee (1940–2017)
- Alice Munro (1931–2024)
- H. H. Munro ('Saki') (1870–1916)
- Beverle Graves Myers (born 1951)
- R. K. Narayan (1906–2001)
- John Neal (1793–1876)

== O–R ==
- Joyce Carol Oates (born 1938)
- Patrick O'Brian (1914–2000), born Richard Patrick Russ
- Tim O'Brien (born 1946)
- Joe M. O'Connell (born 1959)
- Flannery O'Connor (1925–1964)
- Frank O'Connor (1903–1966)
- Liam O'Flaherty (1896–1984)
- John O'Hara (1905–1970)
- Brian O'Nolan (1911–1966)
- Rodrigues Ottolengui (1861–1937)
- Gwendolen Overton (1874/76–1958)
- Grace Paley (1922–2007)
- Dorothy Parker (1893–1967)
- Dave Pelzer (born 1960)
- Lyudmila Petrushevskaya (born 1938)
- Jayne Anne Phillips (born 1952)
- Luigi Pirandello (1867–1936)
- James Plunkett (1920–2003)
- Edgar Allan Poe (1809–1849)
- Eileen Pollack (born 1956)
- Neal Pollack (born 1970)
- Andrew J. Porter
- Katherine Anne Porter (1890–1980)
- Rebecca N. Porter (1883–1963)
- William Sydney Porter, pen name O. Henry (1862–1910)
- Erin Pringle (born 1981)
- Annie Proulx (born 1935)
- Bolesław Prus (1847–1912)
- James Purdy (1914–2009)
- Indra Bahadur Rai (1927–2018)
- Emma May Alexander Reinertsen (1853–1920)
- Susanne Ringell (born 1955)
- James Robison (born 1946)
- Radoslav Rochallyi (born 1980)
- José Luis Rodríguez Pittí (born 1971)
- Judi Rohrig (born 20th century)
- Philip Roth (1933–2018)
- Samir Roychoudhury (1933–2016)
- Damon Runyon (1884–1947)
- Karen Russell (born 1981)

== S–T ==
- Sarojini Sahoo (born 1956)
- Widad Sakakini (1913–1991)
- "Saki" (H. H. Munro) (1870–1916)
- J. D. Salinger (1919–2010)
- James Salter (1925–2015)
- Sérgio Sant'Anna (1941–2020)
- Jean-Paul Sartre (1905–1980)
- John L. Saul (born 1948)
- George Saunders (born 1958)
- Mary Stebbins Savage (1850–1915)
- Daniel Scott (born 1963)
- Will Scott (1893−1964)
- Sanu Sharma
- Robert Sheckley (1928–2005)
- Mary Shelley (1797–1851)
- Lucius Shepard (1947–2014)
- Hilda Siller (1861–1945)
- Robert Silverberg (born 1935)
- Mona Simpson (born 1957)
- Isaac Bashevis Singer (1902–1991)
- Jaspreet Singh (born 1969)
- George Singleton (born 1958)
- Clark Ashton Smith (1893–1961)
- Dag Solstad (1941–2025)
- Gary Soto (born 1952)
- Robin Spriggs (born 1974)
- Jean Stafford (1915–1979)
- Wallace Stegner (1909–1993)
- Bruce Sterling (born 1954)
- Frank R. Stockton (1834–1902)
- Louise Stockton (1838–1914)
- Charles Stross (born 1964)
- Theodore Sturgeon (1918–1985)
- Michael Swanwick (born 1950)
- Anastasia Syromyatnikova (1915–1997)
- Rabindranath Tagore (1861–1941)
- Zakaria Tamer (born 1931)
- Peter Taylor (1917–1994)
- Angeline Teal (1842–1913)
- William Tenn (pseudonym of Philip Klass) (1920–2010)
- Adeline Margaret Tesky (1855–1924)
- Melanie Rae Thon (born 1957)
- Lisa Tolliver
- Aleksey Nikolayevich Tolstoy (1883–1945)
- Leo Tolstoy (1828–1910)
- William Trevor (1928–2016)
- Eugenia Triantafyllou
- Sergio Troncoso (born 1961)
- Judy Troy (born 1951)
- Ivan Turgenev (1818–1883)
- Harry Turtledove (born 1949)
- Mark Twain (1835–1910)

== U–Z ==
- Kavisekhara Dr Umar Alisha (1885–1945)
- John Updike (1932–2009)
- Andrew Vachss (1942–2021)
- Anne Valente (born 1982)
- Jeff VanderMeer (born 1968)
- Voltaire (1694–1778)
- Kurt Vonnegut (1922–2007)
- Eli Waldron (1916–1980)
- Howard Waldrop (1946–2024)
- David Foster Wallace
- Robert Walser (1878–1956)
- Marion E. Warner (1839–1918)
- Manly Wade Wellman (1903–1986)
- Eudora Welty (1909–2001)
- Jessamyn West (1902–1984)
- Edith Wharton (1862–1937)
- Edmund White (1940–2025)
- Christopher Willard (born 1960)
- D. Harlan Wilson (born 1971)
- Annie Steger Winston (1862–1927)
- P. G. Wodehouse (1881–1975)
- Gene Wolfe (1931–2019)
- Tobias Wolff (born 1945)
- Kirby Wright
- Mary Tappan Wright (1851–1917)
- Richard Yates (1926–1992)
- Marguerite Yourcenar (1903–1987)
- Mohamed Zafzaf (1942–2001)
- Gloria Zamacois (1897–1946)
- Gul M. Zhowandai(1905–1988)
- Aleksandar Žiljak (born 1963)
- Stefan Zweig (1881–1942)

== See also ==
- Lists of writers
