= Tefft =

Tefft may refer to:

- Tefft (surname)
- Tefft, Indiana
- Tefft-Steadman House
