= COVID-19 pandemic in Indiana =

- Disease: COVID-19
- Pathogen: SARS-CoV-2
- Location: Indiana, U.S.
- Index case: Indianapolis
- Arrival date: March 5, 2020 (1st positive March 6)
- Confirmed cases: 619,995
- Hospitalized cases: 1,915 (current)
- Critical cases: 420
- Ventilator cases: 232
- Deaths: 27,981

Government website
- www.in.gov/coronavirus/ backontrack.in.gov

The COVID-19 pandemic reached the U.S. state of Indiana on March 5, 2020, and was confirmed on March 6. As of July 12, 2021, the Indiana State Department of Health (ISDH) had confirmed 757,904 cases in the state and 13,496 deaths. As of July 3, 2020, all 92 counties had reported at least 10 cases with Pike County being the last to surpass this threshold.

As of July 12, 2021, approximately 2.91 million Indiana residents were fully vaccinated, or about 43.2 percent of the population.

== Timeline ==
=== March 2020 ===
On March 6, Indiana health officials announced the first confirmed case of COVID-19 in Indiana, and Governor Eric Holcomb declared a public health emergency in the state. The first case was a Marion County (Indianapolis) resident who had attended the BioGen conference in Boston.

On March 16, the first death from COVID-19 was announced. Governor Holcomb also ordered all bars, restaurants, and nightclubs to close to in-house patrons; only take-out would be permitted.

On March 19, Governor Holcomb announced numerous actions in response to the pandemic. These included the following:

- The State of Emergency was to be extended for another 30 days beyond its previously scheduled expiration of April 5.
- All K-12 schools (both public and private) were to remain closed until at least May 1, and all state-mandated standardized tests were canceled.
- An Executive Order prohibiting evictions and foreclosures was issued. Utilities were prohibited from disconnecting services.
- Extensions for paying income taxes (to July 15) and property taxes (60 days beyond May 11) were granted.

On March 20, Marion County had its second death, making three for the state.

On March 21, the fourth death occurred in the state, in Muncie (Delaware County). Three additional deaths occurred on March 22, one each in Scott, Marion, and Allen Counties.

On March 23, Governor Holcomb issued a 'stay at home' order effective March 25 through April 7. He put the following restrictions in place:

- Public gatherings were limited to 10 people
- Non-essential businesses were ordered to close or allow for remote work. Some examples of businesses closed included hair and nail salons, entertainment venues, theaters, and fitness centers.
- Essential businesses included grocery stores, pharmacies, home improvement stores, auto repairs, medical providers, gas stations, pet care, trades, and professional services like accountants and law offices.
- Penalties for violating the order could include a fine of up to $1,000 and 180 days in jail, though the Governor was vague about how enforcement would work and said police would not pull over motorists.

Governor Holcomb issued additional executive orders closing many state government offices, extending state-issued licenses and permits 60 days, and giving the Indiana Alcohol and Tobacco commission the authority to suspend or revoke liquor licenses for establishments that were not complying with a previous directive to engage in carryout sales only.

On March 26, eight residents and two staff members of a Johnson County, Indiana senior home tested positive for COVID-19.

The spike in deaths on March 31 also includes some deaths from previous days. Reporting of those deaths had been delayed pending tests confirming COVID-19.

For the month of March, Indiana had 123 deaths from COVID-19, all from the second half of the month, and 2,560 cases. Marion County had the most cases at 1,117, but cases were reported in 83 of Indiana's 92 counties. A total of 14,375 tests were conducted.

Due to delays in receiving test results, March death totals were gradually revised upward in later months. The first deaths, two, were actually on March 9, and the total number of deaths in March was 214. (Each date's report is actually from the previous date ending at 11:59 pm.)

=== April 2020 ===
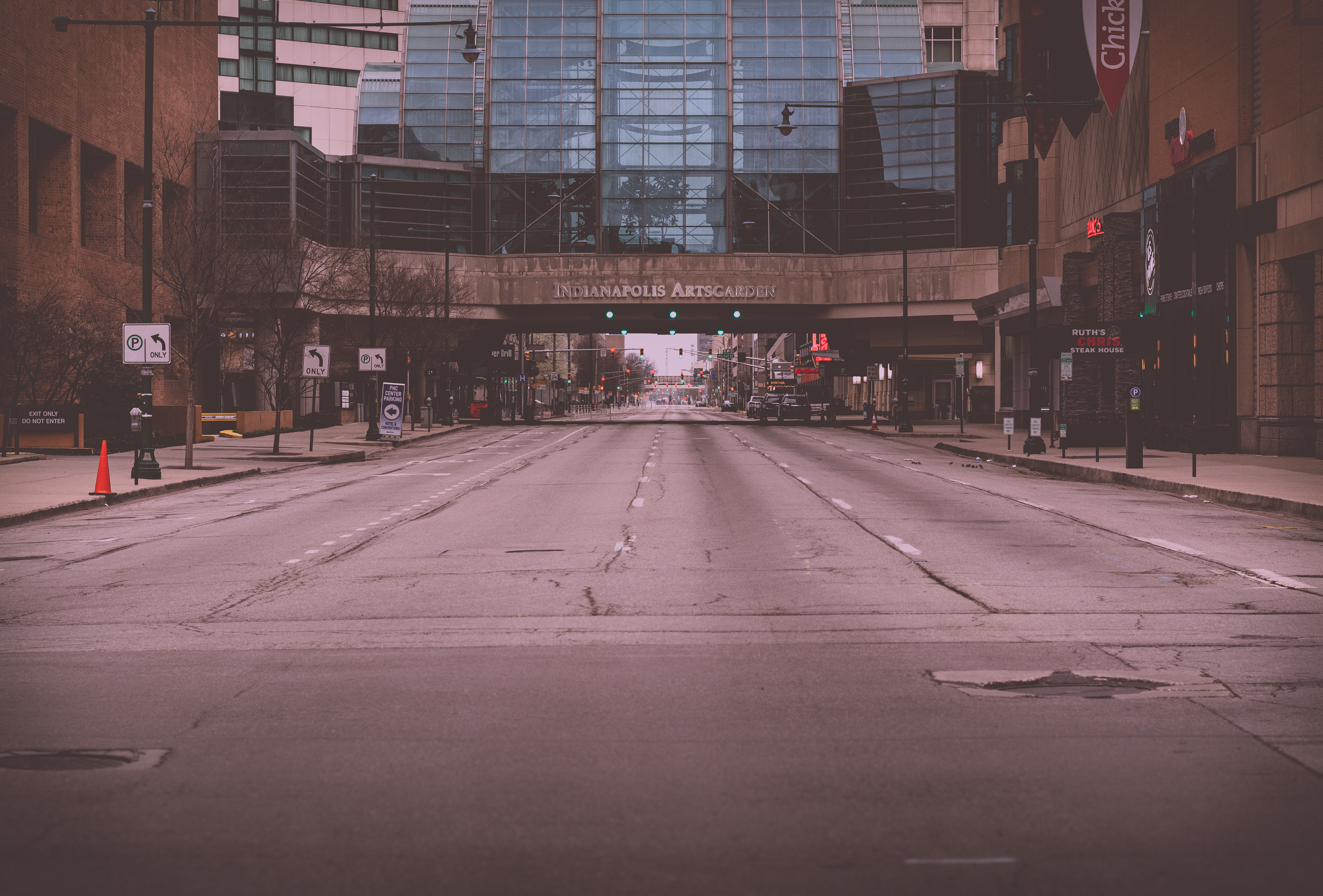
Illinois Street in downtown Indianapolis under stay-at-home orders, April 5, 2020.

On April 1, Marion County extended their stay-at-home order until May 1 and closed all golf courses (effective April 3).

On April 2, Indiana Superintendent of Public Instruction, Dr. Jennifer McCormick, announced that all K-12 schools would provide remote instruction for the remainder of the 2019–2020 school year. The new order also permitted them to conclude the school year once they had provided 20 days of remote learning after April 2 (meaning the school year could end as soon as May 1), even if school had not met for 160 days.

On April 3, Governor Holcomb extended the stay-at-home order by two weeks, to April 20, and the state public health emergency by 30 days, to May 3.

On April 12, cases were reported in all 92 of Indiana's counties.

On April 17, Governor Holcomb announced that the stay-at home order would be extended on April 20 to May 1.

On April 17, Hundreds gather & protest outside of the Governor's Mansion on Meridian Street protesting the stay at home Executive Order.

On April 20, a second protest took place at the Indiana Statehouse in preparation of the larger planned protest for May 1, 2020, stoking the ire of Indiana Governor Eric Holcomb

On April 27, 65 positive cases had been confirmed at a nursing home in Clarksville.

=== May 2020 ===
State of Indiana Executive Order 20-26: Roadmap to Reopen Indiana

On May 1, Governor Holcomb announced a five-stage plan detailing the gradual reopening of business sectors in Indiana, with the final stage, completely reopening the state without restrictions, culminating on July 4. The previous statewide lock down was retroactively deemed Stage One. Stage Two began on May 4, with retail and commercial businesses operating at 50% capacity and mall common areas restricted to 25% capacity. A week after entering Stage 2, restaurants can open at 50% capacity for dine-in service and personal services can be performed by appointment only. Remote work was encouraged where possible.

Bars, gyms, entertainment events and venues such as zoos, concert halls, movie theaters, bowling alleys, amusement parks, playgrounds, adult day cares, casinos, community swimming pools and camps are not open during Stage 2. However, churches will reopen on May 8. Religious services were specifically exempted from the 25-person rule.

Additional restrictions remained in place for the three hardest-hit counties: Cass County, Lake County, and Marion County.

The continued progression of the plan is contingent on 4 guiding principles:

- "The number of hospitalized COVID-19 patients statewide has decreased for 14 days."
- "The state retains the ability to test all Hoosiers who are COVID-19 symptomatic, as well as healthcare workers, essential workers, first responders, and others as delineated on the ISDH website."
- "The state retains its surge capacity for critical care beds and ventilators."
- "Health officials have systems in place to contact all individuals who test positive for COVID-19 and complete contact tracing."

On May 2, a photo of Governor Eric Holcomb violating his own recommendation to wear a mask and his Executive Order mandating social distancing goes viral on social media.

=== June 2020 ===
On June 3, Governor Holcomb issued Executive Order 20–30, extending the public health disaster emergency declaration to July 4.

=== July 2020 ===
On July 22, Indiana Governor Eric Holcomb announces that he plans to issue a mask mandate with criminal penalties.

On July 22, Indiana Attorney General Curtis Hill warns that Governor Holcomb has no authority to enact a mask mandate with criminal penalties.

On July 23, Sheriffs from four Indiana counties: Sullivan, Hamilton, Delaware and Johnson announce that they will not enforce the governor's edict as he has no authority to create legislation and has refused to call in the Indiana General Assembly into a Special Session to draft a legitimate bill.

On July 24, Governor Eric Holcomb issues an Executive Order implementing a statewide mask mandate that will go into effect on July 27, 2020, but relented and removed the criminal penalties for disobedience.

On July 29, Governor Holcomb is caught violating his own mask mandate & social distancing executive order.

=== August 2020 ===
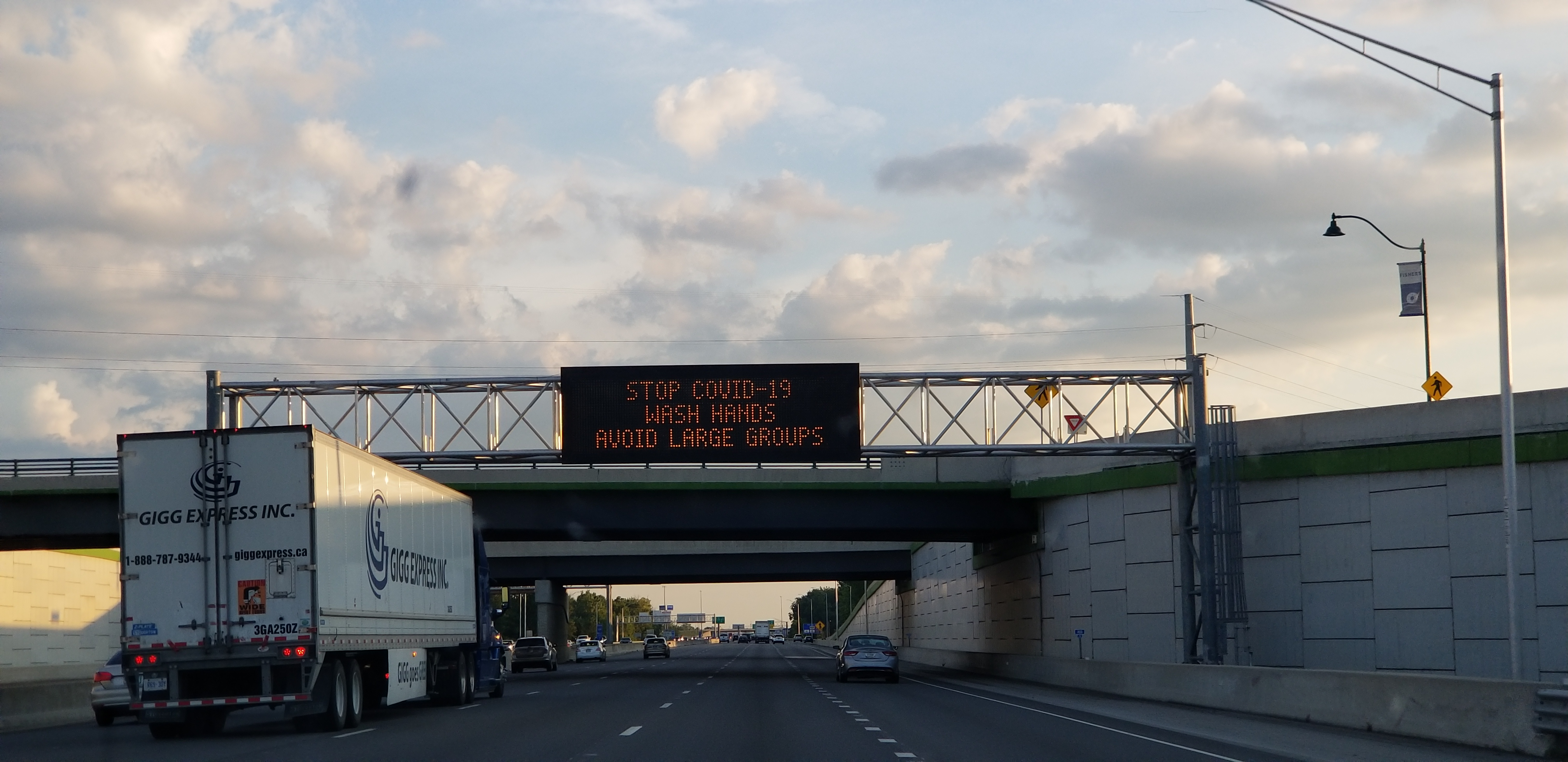
A variable-message sign over Interstate 69 in Fishers displays information about how to protect oneself from COVID-19, August 22, 2020.

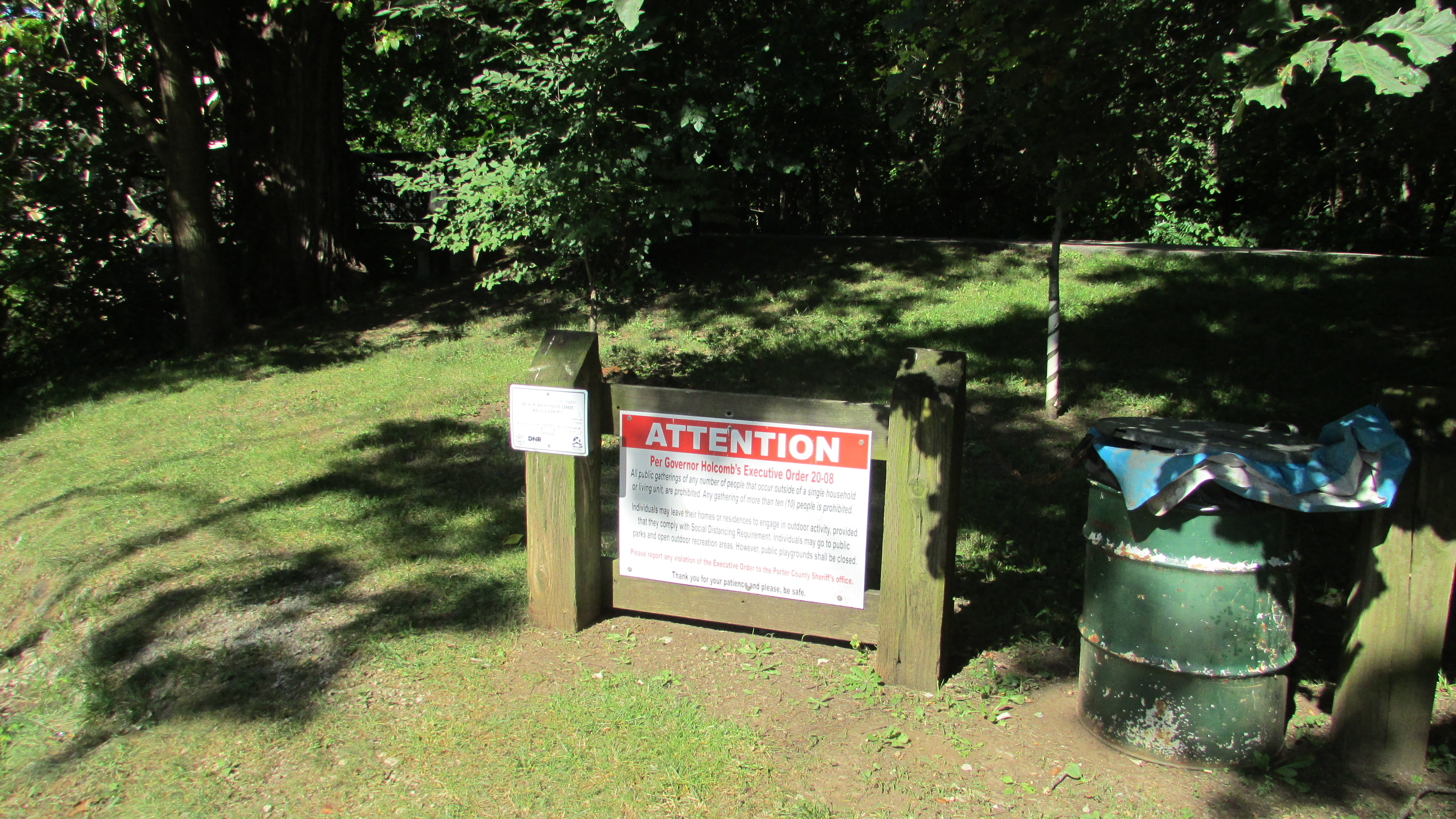
A sign in Dunns Bridge County Park, warning people against gathering in violation of Governor Holcomb's order.

Not long after public schools reopened (for the first time since March), one student and one school staff member tested positive for COVID-19. The student tested positive on the first day of class. The student was isolated in the school clinic under the "Positive COVID-19 Test Protocol". Nurses began contact tracing procedures. Under the protocol, close contacts are expected to quarantine for 14 days before they can return to school.

Staff and students who test positive can return to school after a 10-day isolation period if they have been non-symptomatic for 72 hours.

Between August 8 and August 25, the University of Notre Dame had a total of 408 confirmed positive cases. One of Notre Dame's student newspapers, The Observer, published a front-page editorial titled, "Don't Make Us Write Obituaries". In-person classes for undergraduates were canceled for two weeks. Students were not sent home.

On August 20, Purdue University suspended a cooperative house and 36 students for attending an off-campus party.

On August 28, Wabash County Council unanimously passes a resolution in support of fully reopening the state as small businesses are being permanently damaged & bankrupted; several reports on social media report that there is no enforcement of social distancing, mask mandates or occupancy restrictions within Wabash County, Indiana.

=== September 2020 ===
On September 1, 30 out of 40 fraternities and sororities at Indiana University Bloomington were quarantined. The test positivity rate was 8.1% among students living in fraternity and sorority housing, and 1.63% among students living in residence halls. An outbreak of 14 cases was announced at Wabash College. The number of confirmed cases at Notre Dame was 577.

On September 2, Notre Dame had put security personnel at its off-campus COVID-19 quarantine and isolation sites, because some students had been leaving their quarantine locations. Classes resumed at Notre Dame, with the goal of phasing in all classes for in-person instruction by September 7. Indiana University recommended that all 40 Greek life houses be closed.

=== January 2021 ===
On January 11, a confirmed case of a new, more contagious SARS-CoV-2 variant from the United Kingdom was reported in Indiana.

=== July 2021 ===
As of July 29, Indiana's vaccination rate was only 44%, far short of the 70 to 85 percent needed to slow transmission. On July 20, US District Judge Damon R. Leichty upheld an Indiana University policy requiring that students receive COVID-19 vaccinations by August 15, if they wished to return to campus for the fall semester.

The Delta variant accounted for 86.7% of positive tests in Indiana during July. Hospitals reported 33% of ICU beds and 78% of ventilators were available, compared with 41% ICU beds and 41% ventilators in April 2020.

=== August 2021 ===
On August 12, Justice Amy Coney Barrett denied a challenge directed to her in regard to Indiana University's vaccine mandate, with no noted dissent from the other justices. This marked the first legal test of COVID-19 vaccine mandates before the Supreme Court.

== Impact on sports ==
=== National Basketball Association ===
On March 12, the National Basketball Association announced the season would be suspended for 30 days, affecting the Indiana Pacers. On June 4, the NBA announced a preliminary plan to restart the season on July 31 with 22 teams, including the Pacers, playing all the remaining games at Walt Disney World Resort. Teams would also practice and be housed there for the remainder of the season.

=== Women's National Basketball Association ===
On June 15, the Women's National Basketball Association announced plans to start the delayed 2020 season in late July, playing a 22-game season followed by traditional playoffs at IMG Academy in Bradenton, Florida. Under the plan, all WNBA teams (including the Indiana Fever) would practice and be housed at IMG Academy for the entire season and would play all games without fans in attendance.

=== National Collegiate Athletic Association ===
On March 12, the National Collegiate Athletic Association, headquartered in Indianapolis, canceled all winter and spring tournaments, most notably the Division I men's and women's basketball tournaments, affecting colleges and universities statewide. The announcement came as men's basketball teams from Michigan and Rutgers were warming up on-court at Bankers Life Fieldhouse for the third game of the Big Ten men's basketball tournament.

=== Auto racing ===
On March 26, the IndyCar Series announced that the 2020 Indianapolis 500 would be held on August 24, 2020—marking the first time since the race resumed in 1946, after the conclusion of World War II, that it was not held on Memorial Day weekend. Indianapolis Motor Speedway's road course race, the GMR Grand Prix, was held on July 4, 2020, during the NASCAR Cup Series' Brickyard 400 race weekend, as part of a double-header with the NASCAR Xfinity Series' Pennzoil 150, all of them held behind closed doors. IndyCar had delayed the start of the 2020 season due to the pandemic.

New IndyCar and IMS owner Roger Penske disclosed in June that he preferred the 500 to be run with spectators in attendance (in order to showcase renovations made to the facility after he took ownership), and that he would be open to postponing the event to October if it cannot be held with fans in August. On June 26, IndyCar announced that the 500 would be held in August with spectators, with capacity capped at half. On August 4, the IMS announced that the race will be held without spectators.

=== Indiana High School Athletic Association ===
On April 2, the Indiana High School Athletic Association announced the cancellation of all spring sports tournament series events for the 2019–20 school year. This decision ultimately ended the Big Eight Conference prematurely.

== Impact on other events ==
On March 20, 2020, Governor Holcomb issued Executive Order 20–07, postponing the 2020 Indiana primary election, originally scheduled for May 5, to June 2.

On May 19, 2020, Gen Con organizers cancelled the 2020 Gen Con, converting 2020 registrations into registrations for Gen Con 2021 on August 5–8, 2021.

On June 4, 2020, the Indiana State Fair was cancelled, having originally been scheduled for August 7 to August 23.

== See also ==
- Timeline of the COVID-19 pandemic in the United States
- COVID-19 pandemic in the United States – for impact on the country
- COVID-19 pandemic – for impact on other countries
- COVID-19 at the University of Notre Dame – for impact on the University of Notre Dame, which is located in South Bend, Indiana
