= Genesee Wesleyan Seminary =

Defunct seminary in Lima, New. York

The Genesee Wesleyan Seminary was the name of two institutions located on the same site in Lima, New York.

The Genesee Wesleyan Seminary was founded in 1831 by the Genesee Annual Conference of the Methodist Episcopal Church after the Conference appointed a committee for to establish the seminary in 1829. In 1849 there was a substantive attempt to upgrade the institution to a truly college-level entity and Genesee College was created to replace the seminary. By the end of the Civil War, changes in regional economic patterns towards rail lines and away from canals made the location at Lima seem unfavorable, and plans by civic leaders in Syracuse for a new university in that city led to the removal of Genesee College to Syracuse in 1870, where it became the basis of Syracuse University.

The Genesee Wesleyan Seminary remained opened at Lima until 1941. Although vacant through the war years of World War II, in 1947 a new Genesee Junior College opened on the grounds in 1947, again under the auspices of the Methodist Episcopal Church. This junior college closed in 1951 and the Elim Bible College has operated on the grounds since that time. Two seminary buildings were listed on the National Register of Historic Places in 1976.

== History ==
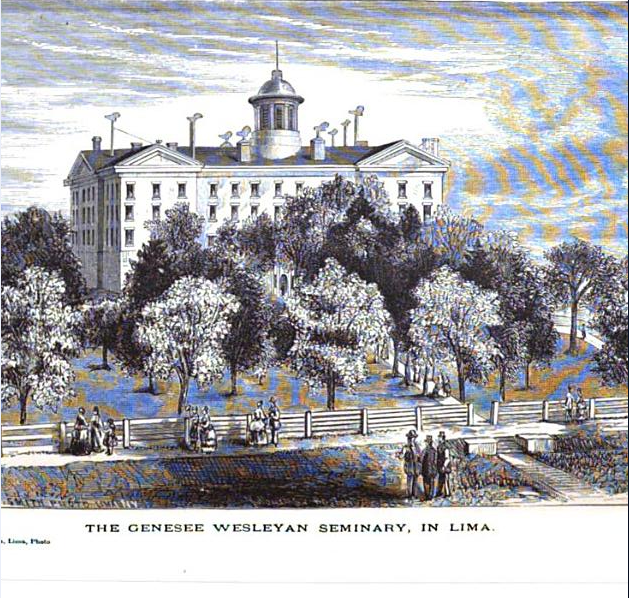
The Seminary depicted in 1870

The Rev. Dr. Samuel Luckey was elected the first Principal of the Genesee Wesleyan Seminary, upon which he was transferred from the New York Annual Conference of the Methodist Episcopal Church to its Genesee Conference. He remained in this office until 1836, when he was elected by the Methodist Episcopal General Conference as the Editor of The Christian Advocate and Journal, an important denominational periodical.

Opening in 1831, there were 341 students the first year. The Agents of the seminary solicited funds for the erection of handsome buildings.

Under the administrations of the Rev. Schuyler Seager, the seminary grew. Seager was born 8 July 1807 in Simsbury, Connecticut. He joined the Genesee Conference in 1833. He graduated from Wesleyan University in 1836. That same year he was appointed Teacher of Moral Science and Belles-Lettres in the Genesee Wesleyan Seminary. He became Principal of the seminary in 1837. He entered pastoral ministry in 1844 and then returned to the seminary in 1854, again as Principal. In 1856-57 he was made Principal of the Genesee Model School in Lima, New York, an offshoot of the seminary. Maria Hyde Hibbard served as Preceptor.

Joseph Cummings was appointed President of Genesee in 1854, a position he held until 1857.

After the removal of Genesee College, Genesee Wesleyan seminary flourished under the presidency of the Rev. G.H. Bridgeman, as reported by Bishop Simpson. At that time, it had large and commodious buildings and all the facilities of a first-class seminary. The institution did not survive the early World War II years.

=== Notable alumni ===
- Anna Smeed Benjamin, social reformer
- Adolphus W. Burtt, South Dakota Attorney General
- George H. Durand, served in the United States Congress for the state of Michigan.
- Mary Galentine Fenner, poet and litterateur
- Charles Henry Fowler, President of Northwestern University from 1873–1876.
- Merton W. Herrick, member of the Wisconsin State Assembly.
- Kenneth Keating, US Senator and ambassador
- Henry A. Patterson, member of the Wisconsin State Assembly.
- Henry Jarvis Raymond, journalist and politician who was a founder of The New York Times
- Sarah Amelia Scull, Greek scholar and author of Greek Mythology Systematized, who became one of the leading Greek scholars in the world during her time. and Catalogue on Greek Art.

== Genesee College ==
In 1850 it was resolved to enlarge the institution from a seminary into a college or to connect a college with the seminary. The Rev. Dr. Benjamin Franklin Tefft was elected President of this endeavor. The name was to be Genesee College. However, the location was thought by many not to be sufficiently central in local economic transportation networks. It was resolved, therefore, to remove the college to Syracuse, New York, where it became the nucleus of Syracuse University. The college, its libraries, its students and faculty, and the college's two fraternity chapters all relocated to Syracuse.

=== Notable alumni ===
- Belva Ann Lockwood (October 24, 1830 – May 19, 1917) was an American attorney, politician, educator and author.
- Martha Van Marter (1839-1931), editor and writer
