= Kankakee Township, Indiana =

Kankakee Township is the name of two townships in the U.S. state of Indiana:

- Kankakee Township, Jasper County, Indiana
- Kankakee Township, LaPorte County, Indiana
