= Kankakee Township =

Kankakee Township may refer to:

- Kankakee Township, Kankakee County, Illinois
- Kankakee Township, Jasper County, Indiana
- Kankakee Township, LaPorte County, Indiana
