= Genesee College =

Former college in Lima, New York

Genesee College was founded as the Genesee Wesleyan Seminary, in 1831, by the Methodist Episcopal Church. The college was located in Lima, New York, and eventually relocated to Syracuse, becoming Syracuse University.

== Genesee Wesleyan Seminary ==
In 1831, the Genesee Wesleyan Seminary was founded in Lima, south of Rochester, by the Genesee Annual Conference of the Methodist Episcopal Church. The Rev. Dr. Samuel Luckey was elected the first principal of the seminary, and was transferred from the New York Annual Conference to the Genesee Conference of the M.E. Church . He remained in office until 1836, when he was elected as editor of The Christian Advocate and Journal, an important periodical for the M.E. General Conference.

In 1850, it was resolved to enlarge the institution from a seminary into a college, or to connect a college with the seminary. The Rev. Dr. Benjamin Franklin Tefft was elected President of this endeavor. The name was chosen as Genesee College. However, the location was thought by many not to be sufficiently central. Its difficulties were compounded by the next set of technological changes: the railroad that displaced the Erie Canal as the region's economic engine bypassed Lima completely. In 1866, after several hard years, the trustees of the struggling college decided to seek a locale whose economic and transportation advantages could provide a better base of support. As Genesee College began looking for a new home, the bustling community of Syracuse, ninety miles to the east, was engaged in a search of its own. The rail age had expanded the prosperity brought by the Erie Canal, and the city was booming, but its citizens yearned for something more:

"What gives to Oxford and Cambridge, England, to Edinburgh, Scotland, to New Haven, Connecticut, their most illustrious names abroad?" asked one local writer. "Their Universities," he answered. "Syracuse has all the advantages: business, social, and religious – let her add the educational and she adds to her reputation, her desirability."

After a year of dispute between the Methodist ministers, Lima and contending cities across the state, it was resolved to remove the college to Syracuse, New York. In 1869, Genesee College obtained New York State approval to move to Syracuse, but Lima got a court injunction to block the move, and Genesee stayed in Lima until it was dissolved in 1875. At its founding on March 24, 1870, the state of New York granted the university its charter independent of Genesee College. The university opened in September 1871. The college, its libraries, the students and faculty, and the college's two secret societies all relocated to Syracuse. Two buildings of the seminary and college were listed on the National Register of Historic Places in 1976.

== Notable faculty and graduates ==
- Anna Smeed Benjamin (1834–1924), social reformer
- John E. Bennett (1833–1893), served on both the Arkansas Supreme Court and the South Dakota Supreme Court
- Joseph Cummings, President of Genesee
- J. W. Eddy (1832–1916), builder of the Angels Flight funicular railway in Los Angeles, California
- George B. Goodwin, Wisconsin legislator and attorney
- Elias DeWitt Huntley, graduate, professor of ancient languages; later president of Lawrence University; Chaplain of the Senate
- Belva Ann Lockwood (1830–1917), attorney, politician, educator and author
- Ellen Sergeant Rude (1838-1916), writer, poet, and temperance reformer
- Joel Dorman Steele (1836-1886), educator and author
- Benjamin Franklin Tefft, President of Genesee
- Adeline Margaret Tesky (1855–1924), novelist and short story writer
- Edward C. Walker, N.Y. state legislator and attorney
- Sultan bin Salman bin Abdulaziz Al Saud, Second son of King Salman of Saudi Arabia
