= Charles Henry Fowler =

Canadian-American journalist and bishop (1837–1908)

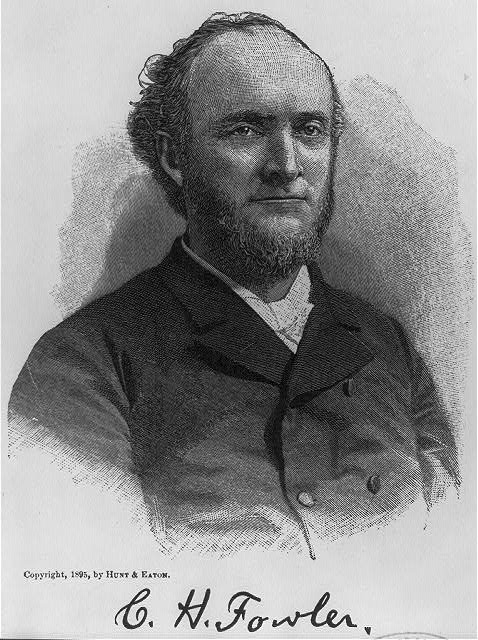

4th President of Northwestern University
- In office 1872–1876
- Preceded by: Erastus Otis Haven
- Succeeded by: Joseph Cummings; Oliver Marcy (acting)

Personal details
- Born: August 11, 1837 Burford Ontario, Canada
- Died: March 20, 1908 (aged 70) New York City, New York
- Spouse: Esther Ann Warner (1837-1866) m. 1863; Myra Amanda Hitchcock (1842-1918) m. 1868
- Education: Genesee Wesleyan Seminary
- Profession: Educator

Charles Henry Fowler (August 11, 1837 – March 20, 1908) was a Canadian-American bishop of the Methodist Episcopal Church (elected in 1884) who served as the 4th president of Northwestern University from 1872 to 1876.

== Early life ==
Charles was born in Burford Ontario, Canada. At the age of four he was taken to Illinois, United States. Charles spent some time at the Rock River Seminary in Illinois. Then he entered the Genesee Wesleyan Seminary at Lima, Livingston County, New York (which became Syracuse University), graduating in 1859. He received the honors of his class and had been the student of another President of Northwestern University, Joseph Cummings, who taught at the seminary from 1854–1867. He matriculated at the Garrett Biblical Institute (connected to Northwestern University) in Evanston, Illinois, from which he graduated in 1861.

At one time he was engaged to Frances E. Willard, famous suffragist and first dean of women of Northwestern University. Their split eventually resulted in her ouster from that position by Fowler.

== Ordained ministry ==
The Rev. Fowler joined the Rock River Annual Conference in 1861. He served in the pastorate for twelve years, all in the city of Chicago. He collected US$40,000 in Eastern cities for the relief of Chicago's churches following the Great Chicago Fire. In 1872, the Rev. Dr. Fowler became the president of Northwestern University in Evanston, having declined this same position in 1861. Four years later he was made Editor of the Christian Advocate based in New York City, an important Methodist periodical of that day. In 1880, he was elected missionary secretary of his denomination. In 1884, he was elected to the episcopacy by the General Conference of the M.E. Church. During a large part of his episcopal service his residence was in San Francisco.

== Founding the College of Puget Sound ==
Dr. Fowler was also the main founder of the College of Puget Sound (now the University of Puget Sound). He came up with the idea while in Tacoma, Washington for a Methodist conference.

== Founding universities in China ==
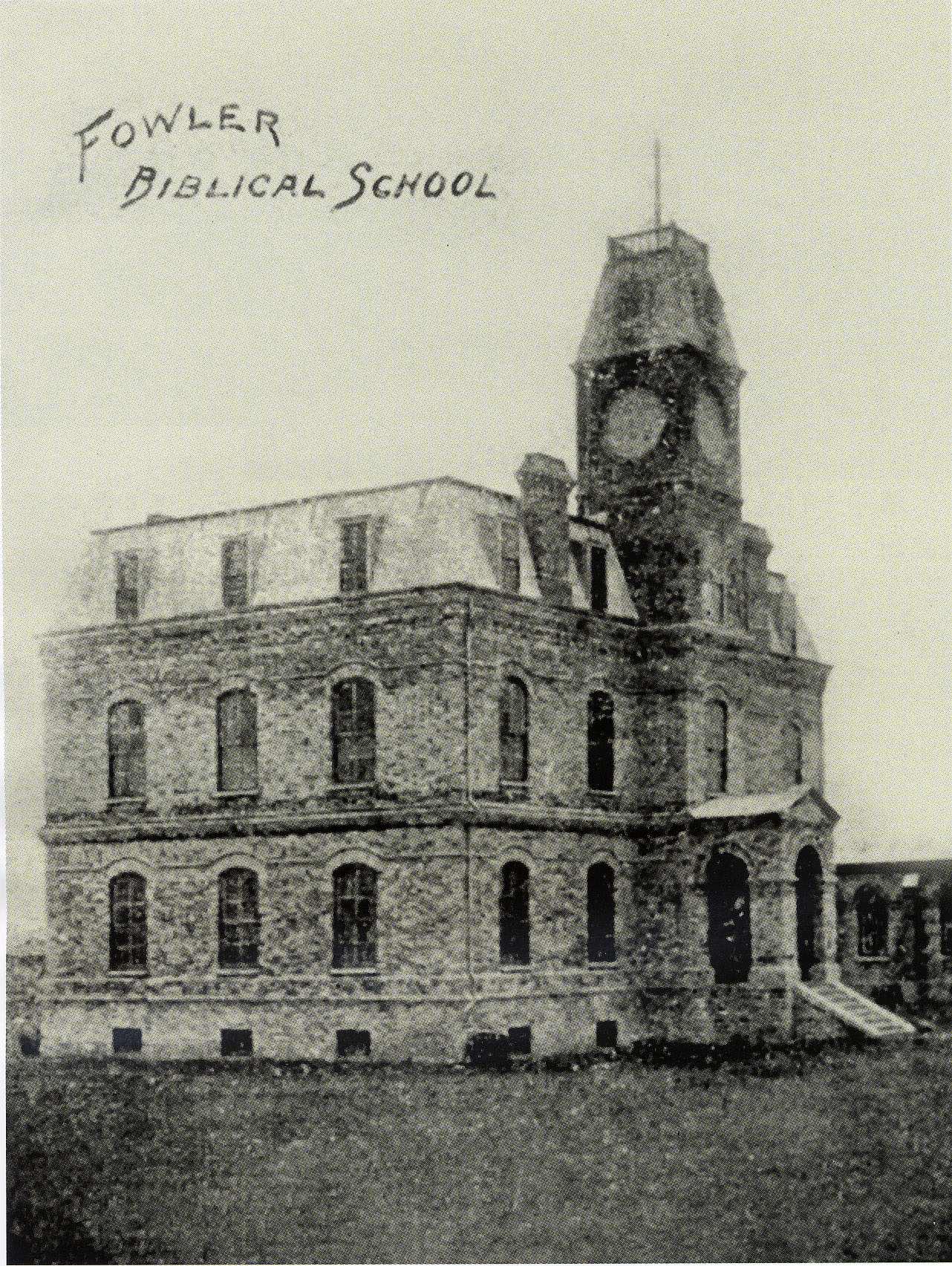
Fowler Biblical School in Nanjing (in Jinling High School now).

Dr. Fowler was the founder of Yenching University and University of Nanking in China.

== See also ==
- List of bishops of the United Methodist Church
- List of Northwestern University presidents
