= Anna Smeed Benjamin =

American social reformer and activist

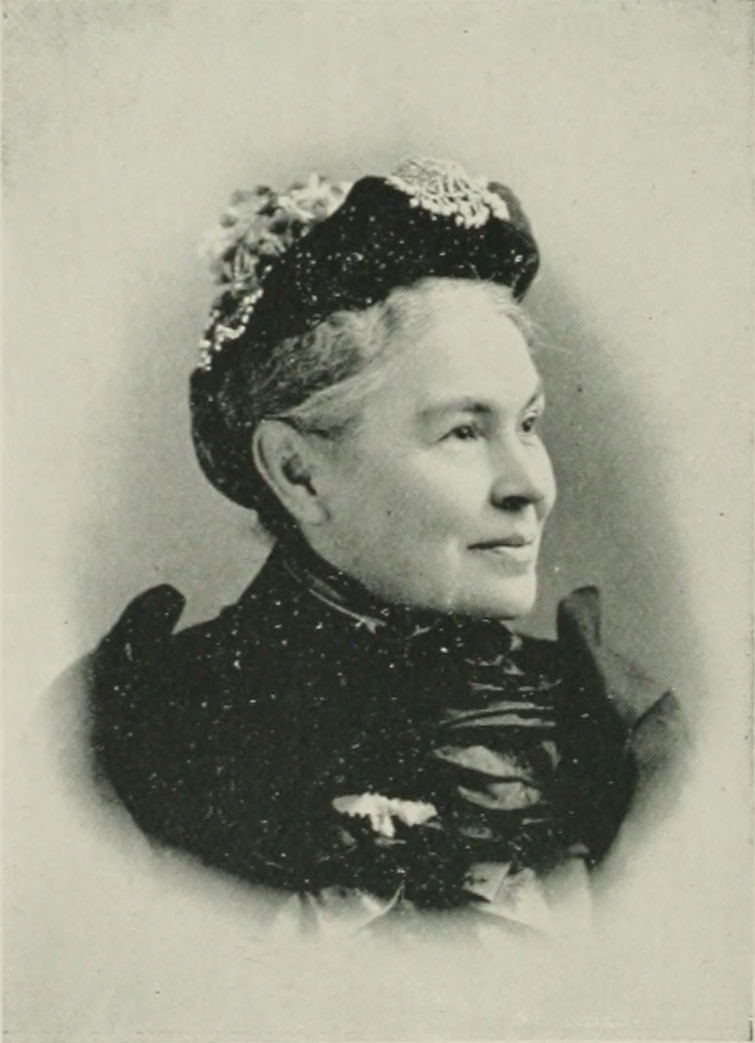
- "A Woman of the Century"
- Born: Anna Smeed; November 28, 1834 near Lockport, Niagara County, New York, U.S.
- Died: June 1, 1924; Grand Rapids, Michigan, U.S.
- Occupation(s): social reformer and activist
- Organization: Woman's Christian Temperance Union
- Movement: Temperance movement in the United States

Anna Smeed Benjamin (née, Smeed; November 28, 1834 – June 1, 1924) was an American social reformer and activist involved in the temperance movement. After being drawn into the work of the Woman's Foreign Missionary Society of the Methodist Episcopal Church, she joined the temperance cause, becoming one of its best known orators. A skilled parliamentarian, in 1887, she was elected National Superintendent of the department of parliamentary uses in the Woman's Christian Temperance Union (WCTU). In this role, she issued a series of "Parliamentary Studies". The drills which she conducted in WCTU "School of Methods" and elsewhere were popular and well attended by both men and women. For ten years, she served as president of the Michigan state WCTU.

== Early life and education ==
Anna Smeed was born near Lockport, Niagara County, New York, November 28, 1834. Her parents were Elon Smeed (b. 1812) and Katherine (Lockrin) Smeed (b. 1813). Each of them was the oldest child of their respective families. Both lost their fathers at an early age. Industrious, energetic and self-reliant in a remarkable degree, a clear sense of right with an almost morbid conscientiousness characterized both. All those traits were markedly developed in their daughter, who, too, was the oldest child. Anna's siblings were Caroline, Sarah, and Albert.

She was educated in the Union School, Lockport, in Genesee Wesleyan Seminary, and in Genesee College, now Syracuse University. In each of those institutions she ranked among the first in her classes.

== Career ==
Benjamin was drawn into the work of the Woman's Foreign Missionary Society of the Methodist Episcopal Church. From that, she passed into the WCTU, founded in 1874 in Ohio as the systematized form of the Women's Crusade. In that community, her abilities at once marked her as a leader. Suffering from a morbid shyness since childhood, she sought to work in obscurity, but circumstances pushed her to the platform. At the convention held in Grand Rapids, Michigan, in 1874, she was made chair of a committee to draft a constitution and by-laws for the newly organized Woman's Christian Temperance Union of the Fifth Congressional District, later becoming president of that body, and continuing in office for 35 years.

She became the superintendent of the national department of parliamentary usage, and the drills which she conducted in the WCTU's "School of Methods". They were also attended by hundreds of men and women at the Chautauquas, where Benjamin had charge; these drills met an ever increasing need and were among the most popular meetings held.

A convincing speaker and a skilled parliamentarian, Benjamin became one of the leaders in State and national WCTU work. She was elected president of the WCTU for the fifth district of Michigan for thirteen consecutive years, and built up temperance interests in the "Bay View Assembly", until that summer camp became a model for others. For ten years, she served as president of the Michigan state WCTU.

== Personal life ==
In 1855, she married George W. Benjamin (1828-1894), a business man. They had one child, a son, Glen (1868-1928).

For years, she suffered from neuralgia.

Anna Smeed Benjamin died at Grand Rapids, Michigan, June 1, 1924.
