= Dunns Bridge, Indiana =

- Unincorporated community
- Location within Indiana Location within the United States
- Coordinates: 41°13′10″N 86°58′09″W
- Country: United States
- State: Indiana
- County: Jasper
- Township: Kankakee
- Elevation: 659 ft (201 m)
- ZIP code: 46347
- FIPS code: 18-19144
- GNIS feature ID: 433800

Dunns Bridge is an unincorporated community in Kankakee Township, Jasper County, Indiana, United States. It sits along the Kankakee River at the south end of two bridges over the river, connecting Jasper and Porter counties. The historic Dunns Bridge lies just west of a modern bridge that carries Porter County Road 500 East and Jasper County Road 400 East over the Kankakee.

The bridge and community are 10 miles (16 km) southeast of the town of Kouts and 6 miles (10 km) northeast of the town of Wheatfield. The bridge lies 2 miles (3 km) north of Tefft, Indiana, which was formerly known as Dunnville. Both the town and the community around the bridge, formally known as Dunn's Original KKK Pleasure Resort, were laid out by Isaac D. Dunn.

== Historic bridge ==
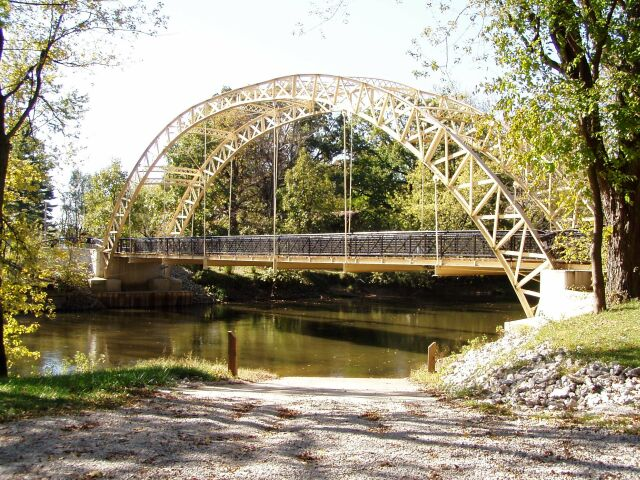

Dunns Bridge is located at 41°13′10″N 86°58′09″W. The bridge is rumored to be built at least partially from materials obtained from the original Ferris wheel at the 1893 World's Columbian Exposition in Chicago. The current maintainers of the bridge, the Porter County Parks Department, state only that it is "built from parts of a building from the 1893 Chicago World's Fair." Upon a cursory look at the lack of parallelness of the tops of the arches (flattening), the Ferris Wheel heritage is impossible. More likely, the arches may have been salvaged from a building at that exposition and the general similarity to a wheel was noted and the misinformation took root as legend.

There are four small sections, two at each end, that appear to be ornamental. These smaller sections have the right radius for a ferris wheel. The radius and arch shape match that of Machinery Hall or Electricity Hall from the Exposition. Machinery Hall burned and the steel was sold as scrap at about the time the bridge was built.

The bridge was renovated in 2003, winning a state award for the engineering work involved.
