= Ellen Sergeant Rude =

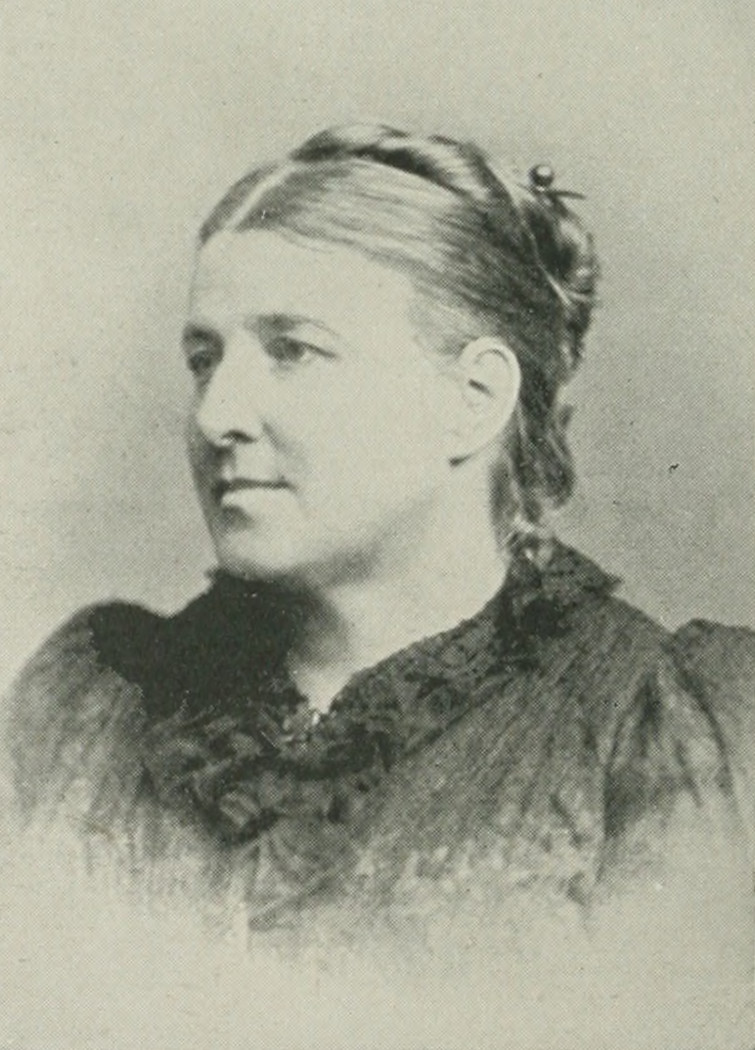
- Portrait from A Woman of the Century (Photo by W. A. Cox, St. Augustine, Fla., 1891)
- Born: Ellen Maria Sergeant; March 17, 1838; Sodus, New York, U.S.
- Died: June 21, 1916 (aged 78); Sodus, New York
- Other name: Mrs. B. C. Rude
- Education: Genesee College
- Occupations: writer; poet; temperance advocate
- Organizations: International Organisation of Good Templars; Woman's Christian Temperance Union
- Notable work: Magnolia Leaves; Two Legends
- Title: President, Allegany County WCTU
- Term: 1880-81
- Movement: temperance movement
- Spouse: Benton Clark Rude (m. 1859; died 1906)
- Children: 1

Signature
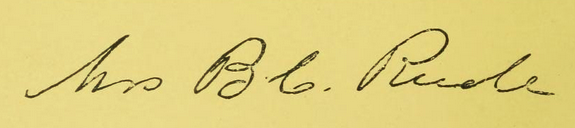

Ellen Sergeant Rude (née, Sergeant; pen name, Mrs. B. C. Rude; March 17, 1838 – June 21, 1916) was an American author, poet, and temperance advocate. While involved in the temperance movement, she was affiliated with the International Organisation of Good Templars (IOGT) and the Woman's Christian Temperance Union (WCTU).

== Early life and education ==
Ellen Maria Sergeant was born in Sodus, New York, March 17, 1838. Her paternal grandmother was a Harkness, and her maternal grandmother was one of the pioneer women of the West. Her mother, Emeline L. (nee Chapman) (1817-1839), died while she was an infant, and the daughter was reared by the father, William Sergeant. Ellen had two older siblings, Emeline (b. 1835) and Hannah (b. 1837).

Her first regular instruction was in the district school at Sodus, where, under the guidance of Lewis H. Clark, an ambitious student and teacher, she received a strong impulse to study. Her school education was completed at Genesee College, in Lima, New York, where she met B. C. Rude, whom she afterward married. In college, she was considered gifted, especially in composition.

In 1876, she received an M.A. degree, causa honoris, from Syracuse University.

== Career ==
Rude wrote much, both in prose and verse, for publication. Her sketches in the Rural New Yorker and Arthur's Home Magazine first brought her to notice. She won a prize for a temperance story from the Temperance Patriot. The Sunday-school Advocate and Well-Spring published many of her stories for children.

In 1859, she married Benton Clark Rude (1837-1906). He was born in Livingston County, New York in 1836. He graduated from Genesee College in 1858, and taught school three years. He read law from 1859 to 1862. In 1863, he engaged in the practice of his profession in Almond, New York where the family remained till 1867, when they removed to Wellsville, New York. From 1873 to 1875, he edited the Reporter.

In March 1868, an IOGT. lodge was organized in Wellsville, New York, with Mr. and Mrs. Rude both named as charter members, and Mrs. Rude named as a charter officer. She was the first woman chosen to the office of Worthy Chief Templar by the Order of Good Templars of New York state. She made her first public address in the State lodge of Good Templars in Rochester, New York and was immediately placed on the board of managers of that order. At the 1869 Board meeting of the IOGT, State of New York, Rude was elected as an officer alongside her sister, Mrs. M. B. Dickinson (who subsequently became Mrs. M. B. O'Donnell).

Magnolia leaves

Two legends

The Women's Crusade was inaugurated at Fredonia, New York , December 15, 1873, and the WCTU was the outgrowth. At the convention called in Syracuse, New York, October 14, 1874, where the state organization was effected, Allegany County was represented by Mrs. Rude of Wellsville, New York, her name appearing as chair of a committee to draft a memorial to President Grant and Governor John Adams Dix. At a temperance convention held in the old academy at Friendship, July 1879, Rude asked all women who were interested to meet her at a stated time in one of the recitation rooms; 25 or 30 responded. After explaining the object and methods of the organization, and urging its benefits as she could so well do, remarks were made by others, and a motion to organize a WCTU prevailed. The first meeting was called in connection with a temperance convention held at Andover, January 28, 1880. 15 names were added to the membership. Articles of constitution were presented by Rude, and adopted. It was known as the Allegany County Woman's Temperance Union. At the first executive committee, Mrs. Rude represented Wellsville. Rude served as president of the Allegany County WCTU in 1880-81. She was made a member of the board of managers of the first State WCTU, established in Syracuse, New York and was one of a committee sent from that convention to appeal to the New York State Legislature in Albany for temperance laws.

Encouraged by her success, and cordially seconded by her indulgent husband, there seemed nothing to hinder her from doing more work on behalf of the temperance movement, but returning home one night to find her only child lying dangerously ill, she canceled all engagements, and abandoned public speaking, although repeatedly urged to again enter the field.

For a few years, she lived in St. Augustine, Florida, during which time she published a volume of poems entitled Magnolia Leaves (Buffalo, 1890). Some of the choicest poems in the Arbor Day Manual were written by her. She contributed to the Magazine of Poetry as well as writing other poems and short stories.

== Personal life ==
In later life, she lived in Duluth, Minnesota, where her husband and only son were engaged in the law field.

Ellen Sergeant Rude died in Sodus, New York, June 21, 1916.

== Selected works ==
=== By Mrs. B. C. Rude ===
- Magnolia Leaves: Poems (Charles Wells Moulton, 1891) (text)
- Two Legends: A Souvenir of Sodus Bay (Mills bros.' publishing house, 1900) (text)
