= Tefft (surname) =

Tefft is a surname. Notable people with the surname include:

- Benjamin Franklin Tefft (1813–1885), American Methodist minister and diplomat
- Charles Tefft (1874–1951), American sculptor
- John F. Tefft (born 1949), American diplomat
- Thomas Alexander Tefft (1826–1859), American architect
