= Sarah Amelia Scull =

American educator and writer

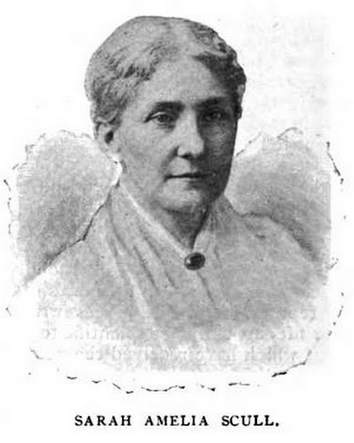
Sarah Amelia Scull, from an 1895 publication.

Sarah Amelia Scull (November 25, 1834 – February 14, 1913) was an American educator and writer, author of Greek Mythology Systematized (1880) and Illustrations of Greek Mythology and Greek Art (1890).

== Early life ==
Sarah Amelia Scull was born in Bushnell's Basin, New York and raised in Smethport, Pennsylvania, the daughter of Paul Ebenezer Scull and Rhoda Tyler Scull. She attended Genesee Wesleyan Seminary in Lima, New York.

== Career ==
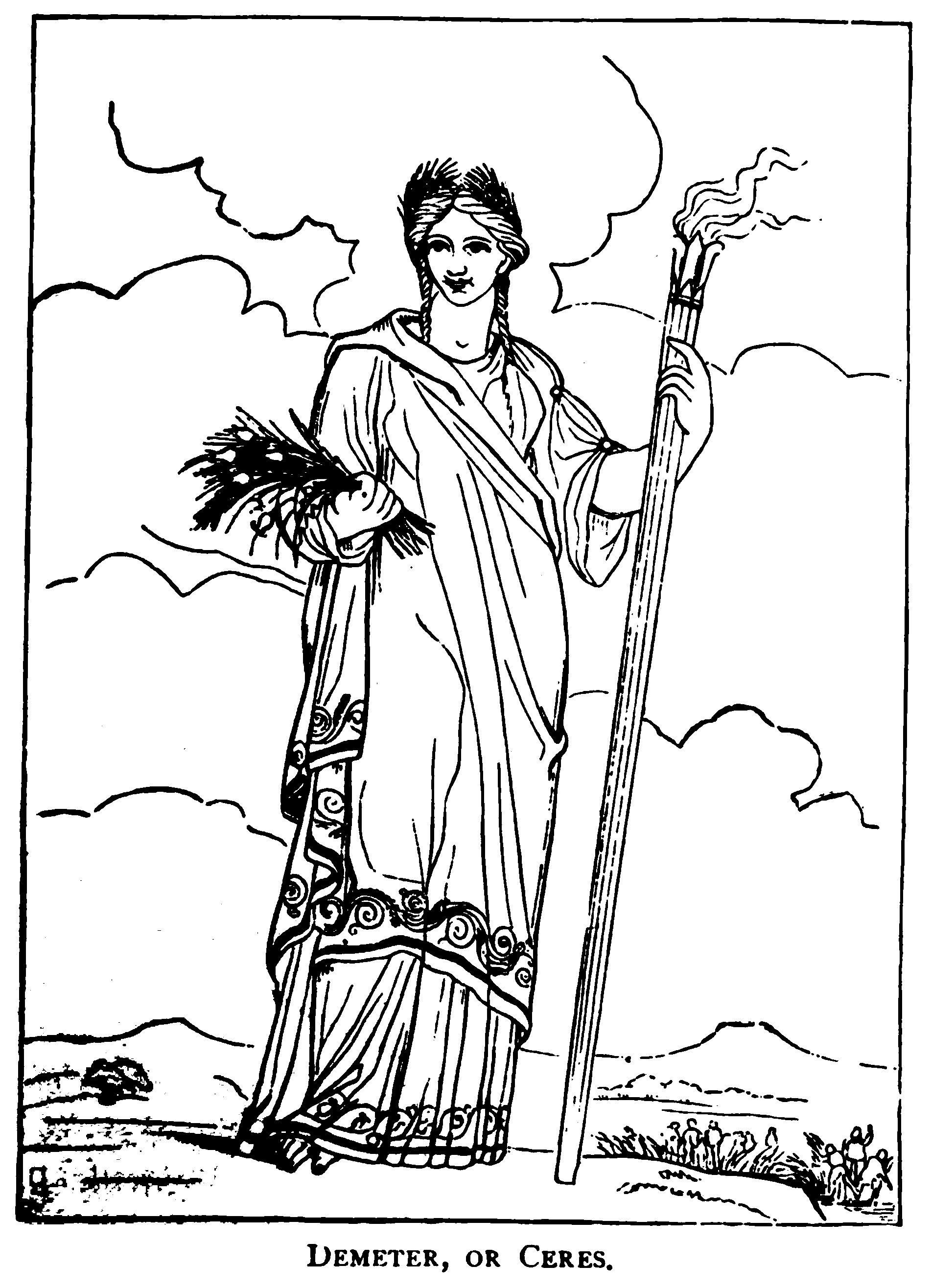
Demeter, or Ceres; an illustration from Scull's Greek Mythology Systematized (1880)

Scull taught at the Pittsburgh Female College in Meadville, Pennsylvania from 1860 to 1866, and at the Chestnut Street Seminary in Philadelphia. She and two other women teachers opened the short-lived Logan Square Seminary in Philadelphia. She became vice-principal of Mount Vernon Seminary in Washington, D.C. after it was founded in 1875. She was also first corresponding secretary of the Women's Anthropological Society.

Scull wrote Greek Mythology Systematized (1880) from her studies and reading on the topic. From her base in Washington, she traveled to Greece in 1886, studying and touring and taking over 500 photographs of scenery, people, architectural ruins and statues. She published the photos as Illustrations of Greek mythology and Greek art (1890). "Because this age is one of financial estimates and enterprises," Scull wrote of her work, "so much the more is there imperative need that we cultivate in every direction, and by every method, power to apprehend and appreciate the precious values of spirit, truth-seeking and beauty-loving."

Scull was listed among the directors of the Washington Archaeological Society for 1895–1897. She was a member of "The Literary", a literary club in Washington. In 1884 the Wesleyan Female College awarded her an honorary doctorate for her scholarship.

== Personal life ==
Scull died from injuries sustained in a house fire in 1913, aged 78 years. An unfinished manuscript on Greek history, a project she had been writing for many years, was lost in the fire with her.
