= Elizabeth Eunice Smith Marcy =

American author, activist and social reformer

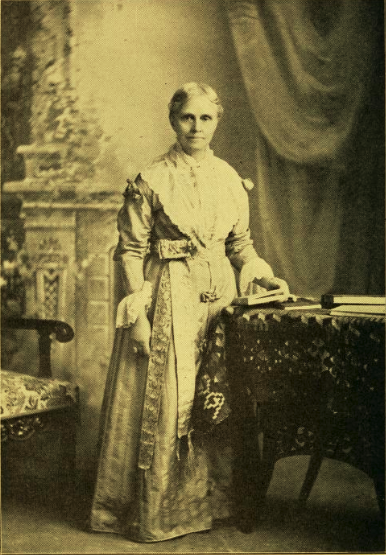
- Born: Elizabeth Eunice Smith; December 22, 1821; East Hampton, Connecticut, U.S.
- Died: January 26, 1911 (aged 89); Evanston, Illinois, U.S.
- Education: Wilbraham Wesleyan Academy
- Occupations: author; activist; social reformer
- Spouse: Oliver Marcy (m. 1847)
- Children: 4
- Relatives: Elder William Brewster; Stephen Hopkins; Elder John Strong

Signature
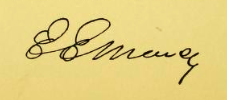

Elizabeth Eunice Smith Marcy (née, Smith; December 22, 1821 – January 26, 1911) was an American author, activist, and social reformer of the long nineteenth century. She was known for her missionary, temperance, and philanthropic work.

== Early life and education ==
Elizabeth Eunice Smith was born in East Hampton, Connecticut, December 22, 1821. She is of Mayflower stock on both sides of her family, tracing her lineage in direct descent from Elder William Brewster and Stephen Hopkins of Mayflower days. Marcy's life, up to the time of her young womanhood, was spent in her home in East Hampton in the atmosphere of a thrifty New Englandfamily. Nathaniel Clark Smith, her father, was respected in the community. He was Justice of the Peace, Selectman, Notary Public and represented his town in the Legislature for several sessions. His family was directly traceable to the famous Eastham Colony, the first exodus from Plymouth, about 1644. Her mother, Charlotte (Strong) Smith, was a lineal descendant, in the seventh generation, from Elder John Strong of England, who came to the United States in 1630.

Marcy was given the usual opportunities for education in the public schools, afterwards in private schools, and still later, in the Wilbraham Wesleyan Academy, all contributing to her training, after which she had further developing in the experience of teaching. She was of artistic temperament and did creditable work in this line as an amateur beginning at a very early age to copy simple designs.

== Career ==
She married Professor Oliver Marcy July 2, 1847, at which time he was a teacher in the Wilbraham Academy. The Marcy's had four children: Annie (b. 1851), Edwin (b. 1854), Frederic (b. 1856), and Maude (b. 1862). In 1862, Professor and Mrs. Marcy came to Evanston, Illinois, he having accepted a professorship in Northwestern University, with which institution he was identified until his death in 1899.

Marcy's passion for helpfulness found expression in her alliance with the Woman's Foreign and Woman's Home Missionary societies of the Methodist Episcopal Church, in both of which she was a charter member. Marcy, by pen and voice, was a recognized leader. As a sort of corollary to her work with the Woman's Home Missionary Society, Marcy undertook to found what is known as the Elizabeth E. Marcy Home in one of the destitute sections of Chicago. The home was conducted as a type of religious settlement. Marcy was also one of the founders of the Woman's Christian Temperance Union (WCTU). She was a member of the Daughters of the American Revolution, being entitled to this order by the service of her paternal grandfather, Sparrow Smith. She was also eligible to membership in the Colonial Dames, having for her progenitor on her mother's side Josiah Cook. She is also by lineal descent from the signers of the original Compact of the Pilgrim Fathers, a member of the Society of the Women of the Mayflower of the State of Illinois.

Marcy's contributions of the press were numerous. In prose, they were chiefly in the direction of her philanthropic work, some of them being of such importance as to warrange their distribution by tens of thousands in pamphlet form. In verse, Marcy was less prolific but not less successful. She excelled as a writer of occasional hymns and songs. One of her hymns, originally contributed to the Hymnal of the Methodist Episcopal Church, was taken up by other hymnals and sung by congregations all over the world.

== Personal life ==
She died at her home in Evanston, January 26, 1911, after a short illness of pneumonia. She was third in a family of eleven children, of whom three brothers and one sister survived her.

== Selected works ==
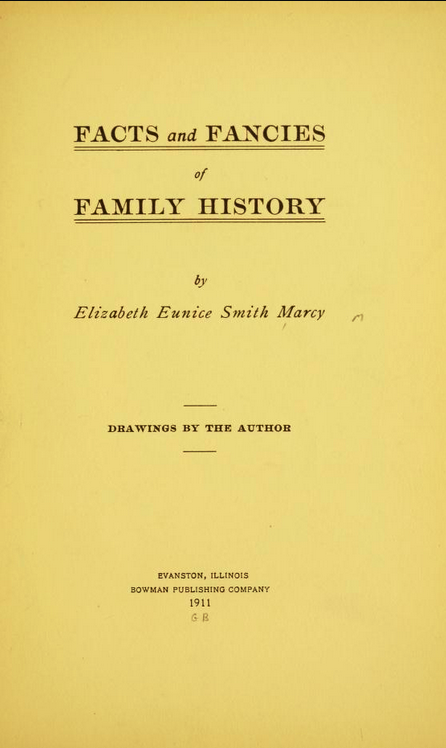
Facts and fancies of family history (1911)

- Facts and Fancies of Family History, 1911
