= Mary Galentine Fenner =

American poet (1839–1903)

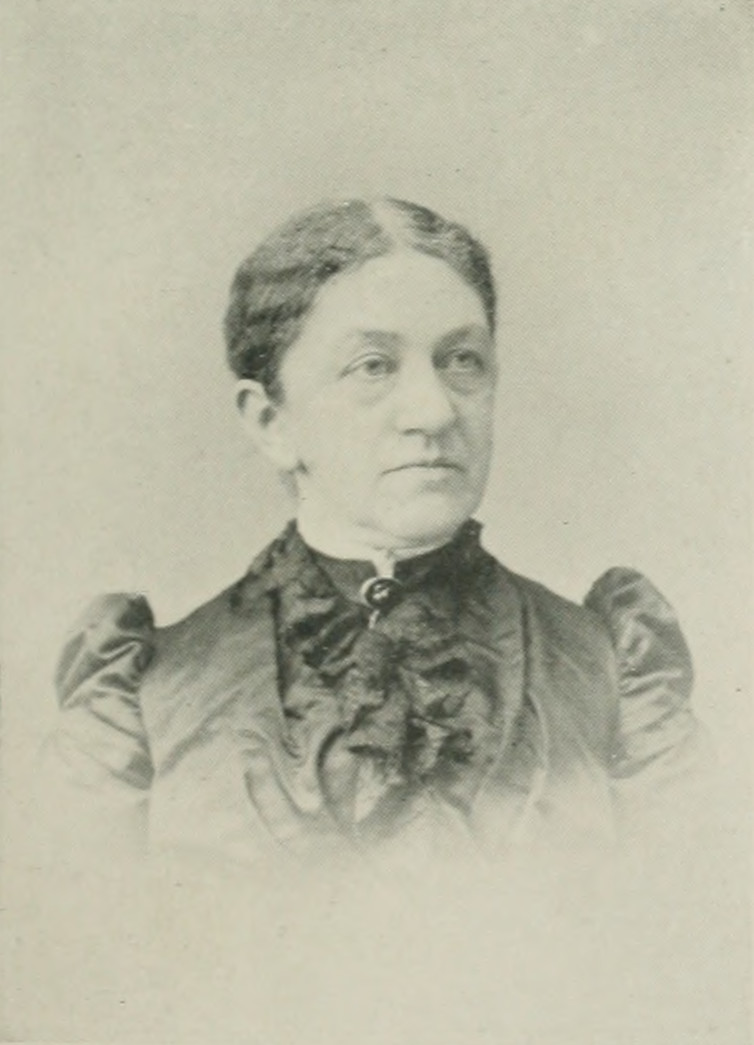
- Photo in A Woman of the Century
- Born: Mary A. Galentine; May 17, 1839; Rush, New York, U.S.
- Died: July 10, 1903 (aged 64); Ovid, New York, U.S.
- Resting place: Evergreen Lawn Cemetery, Akron, New York, U.S.
- Education: Genesee Wesleyan Seminary
- Occupations: poet; litterateur
- Spouse: Francis Drake Fenner (m. 1861; died 1894)

Mary Galentine Fenner (née, Galentine; May 17, 1839 - July 10, 1903) was an American poet and litterateur. She wrote for the Rural New Yorker before becoming a prolific versifier. She was also involved in the temperance and suffrage movements.

== Early life and education ==
Mary A. Galentine was born in Rush, New York, May 17, 1839. Her grandparents were among the first settlers of the Genesee Valley and traced their lineage back to Hollanders. Her father, John Galentine, was a native of Monroe County, then Ontario County, New York born 1803, was a leading man in Monroe County for many years, serving as Justice of Peace and Deputy Sheriff. In early life, he worked on a farm, but later helped to construct the Erie Canal. His wife was Isabel Stull, daughter of Jacob Stull, one of the earliest settlers of Western New York. Fenner had three siblings, Edwin J., Augusta Jane, and Jacob S.

Fenner was educated in Genesee Wesleyan Seminary, Lima, New York. Among her school essays are several written in blank verse. She was graduated in 1861.

== Career ==
At a very early age, Fenner wrote for the Rural New Yorker. Her first published poem, "In Memoriam," dedicated to her mother on the anniversary of her father's death, in 1873, was written while she could not raise her head from her pillow. She subsequently became a prolific versifier, who published one volume of poems.

== Personal life ==
Fenner married Rev. Francis Drake Fenner (1832-1894) on July 24, 1861, one month after completing her studies at Genesee Wesleyan Seminary. They had three children. Francis was a graduate of University of Rochester and Rochester Theological Seminary (now Colgate Rochester Crozer Divinity School). Affiliated with the Seneca Baptist Association, he served as pastor of Baptist churches in Ovid Centre, New York, 1864–07; Jordan, New York, 1807–71; Parma, New York, 1871–74; Ovid Centre, 1874–78; Somerset, New York, 1873–83; and Royalton, New York, 1883. By 1893, they were living in North Manlius, New York, where he had a parish.

After Fenner was widowed in 1894, she moved to Jordan, New York. She died at Ovid, Seneca County, New York, July 10, 1903, and was buried at Evergreen Lawn Cemetery, Akron, New York.

== Works ==
- Poems
