= Oliver Marcy =

American academic

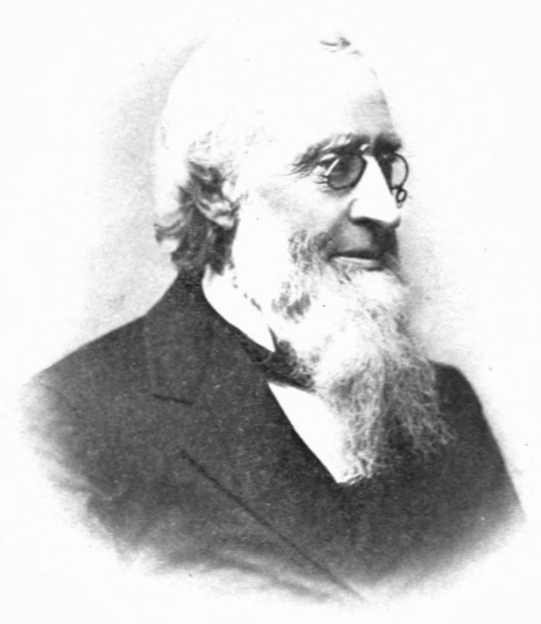

Acting President of Northwestern University
- In office 1890–1890
- Preceded by: Joseph Cummings
- Succeeded by: Henry Wade Rogers
- In office 1876–1881
- Preceded by: Charles Henry Fowler
- Succeeded by: Joseph Cummings

Personal details
- Born: February 13, 1820 Colrain, Massachusetts, US
- Died: March 19, 1899 (aged 79) Evanston, Illinois, US
- Spouse: Elizabeth Eunice Smith (m. 1874)
- Education: Wesleyan Academy; Wesleyan University
- Occupation: Educator

Oliver Marcy (February 13, 1820 – March 19, 1899) was an American academic who served as acting president of Northwestern University twice, first from 1876 to 1881, and then again in 1890.

== Early life and education ==
Oliver Marcy was born in Colrain, Massachusetts on February 13, 1820, the seventh of 11 children. He attended Wesleyan Academy and graduated from Wesleyan University in 1846. After graduation, he worked as a teacher at Wilbraham & Monson Academy, called Wesleyan Academy during his time, from 1846 until leaving to become a professor in 1862.

== Career ==
He became professor of natural science at Northwestern University in 1862 and taught there for 37 years and held a number of faculty posts.

Marcy established the Northwestern University Museum of Natural History and served as its curator from 1871 to his death. He also held several administrative positions at Northwestern. He was Dean of the College of Technology from 1873 to 1876 and Dean of the College of Liberal Arts from 1890 to 1899. Twice he served as Acting President of the University, from 1876 to 1881 and again from May to September 1890.

== Personal life ==
Marcy married Elizabeth Eunice Smith in 1874. They had four children of whom only one, Annie, survived. Mrs. Marcy was very active in temperance causes and Methodist social work; Chicago's Methodist-sponsored settlement house, the Marcy Center, was named in her honor.

== Death ==
Marcy died at his home in Evanston, Illinois on March 19, 1899. He and his wife are buried at Woodland Dell Cemetery in Wilbraham, Massachusetts.
