= Smoke ring (cooking) =

Food characteristic of smoked meats

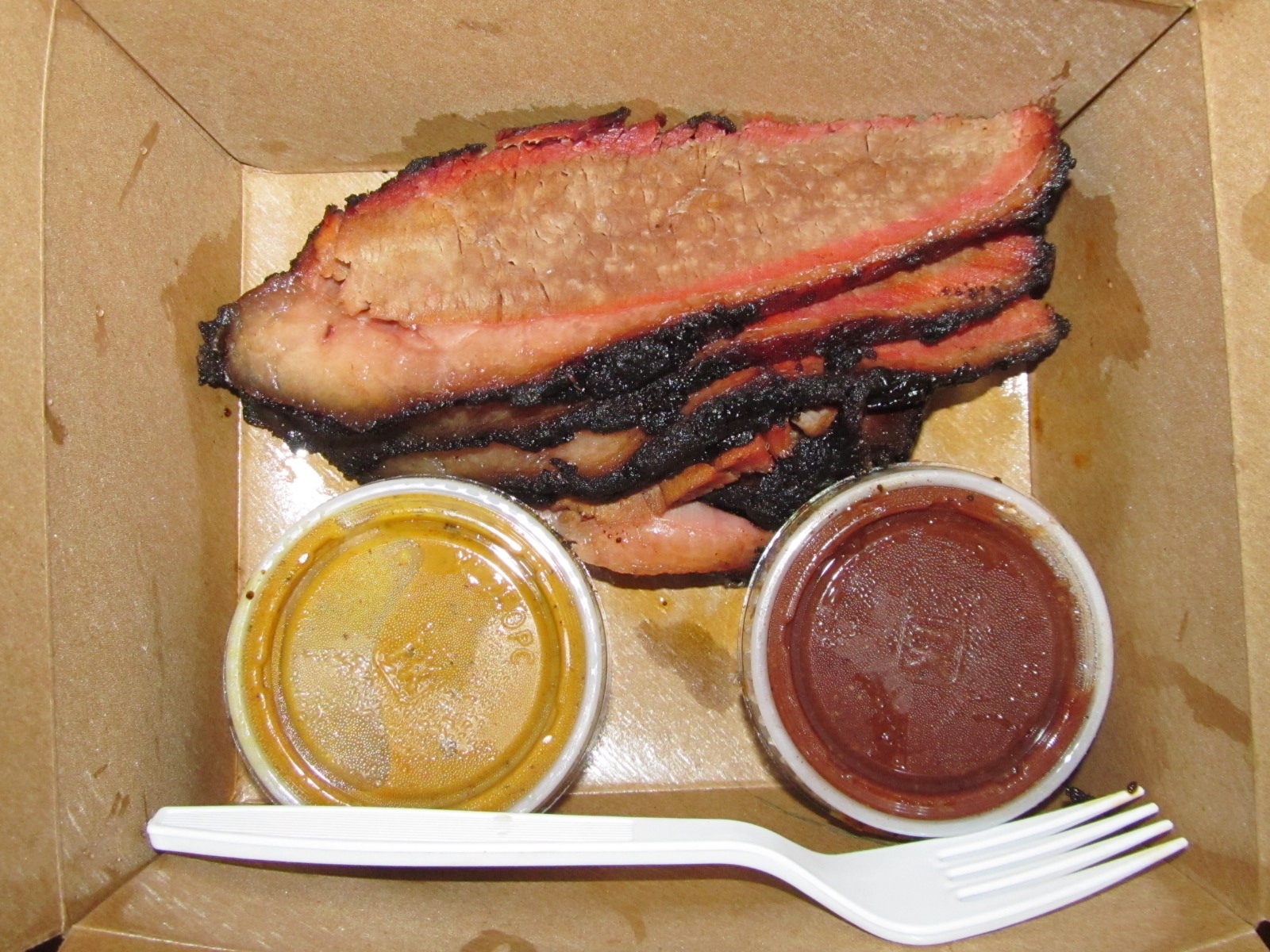
Smoke ring (pink-red) on brisket

A smoke ring is a region of pink colored meat in the outermost 8-10 millimeters of smoked meats. It is usually seen on smoked chicken, pork, and beef. It is widely considered to be a desirable characteristic of barbecue.

== Occurrence ==
The pinkish color in meat is typically due to the presence of a compound called myoglobin. Myoglobin typically darkens and turns brown when heated above a certain temperature. This is why the perimeter of a cooked steak is darker in color than the red inside, as the lower temperature of the middle of the steak was too low to cause the myoglobin to lose its pigment.

When smoking meat slowly, a different process occurs than in other cooking methods. Organic fuels such as wood and charcoal, when burned, produce nitrogen dioxide (NO_{2}) gas. When this gas dissolves into the meat, it reacts with the hydrogen molecules and becomes nitric oxide (NO). The NO combined with the myoglobin forms a stable pink molecule that does not denature in the heat. The depth of the smoke ring is determined by how far the smoke can permeate into the meat.

=== In a smoker ===
There are several considerations when smoking meat that will determine the extent at which a smoke ring will form. However, the most important factor is the fuel source and that source's production of NO_{2}. The highest concentrations of atmospheric NO_{2} can be achieved in a smoker through the utilization of charcoal briquets, or wood fires; both of which are capable of producing up to 200ppm (parts per million) NO_{2} in the cooking chamber. It has been suggested that greener woods produce more NO_{2}, but are less suitable for cooking.

Cooking "low and slow" is said to be key in the development of a smoke ring. This methodology, often cooking at temperatures between 225–250 °F (107–121 °C) for long periods of time, allows smoke to penetrate the meat and react with the myoglobin before the temperature causes a reaction with it causing it to darken. For this reason, keeping the exterior of the meat moist via basting or spritzing is often recommended.

=== Artificially ===
Methods exist to achieve a smoke ring on cooked meats that can be achieved outside of a smoker (or utilized when a propane or electric smoker are used). Marinating or soaking meats in curing salts is one methodology to cure the exterior layers of meat (in similar fashion to how a ham is cured) and cause the perimeter of the meat to remain pink throughout the cooking process.

== See also ==
- List of smoked foods
