= Adeline Margaret Tesky =

Canadian novelist

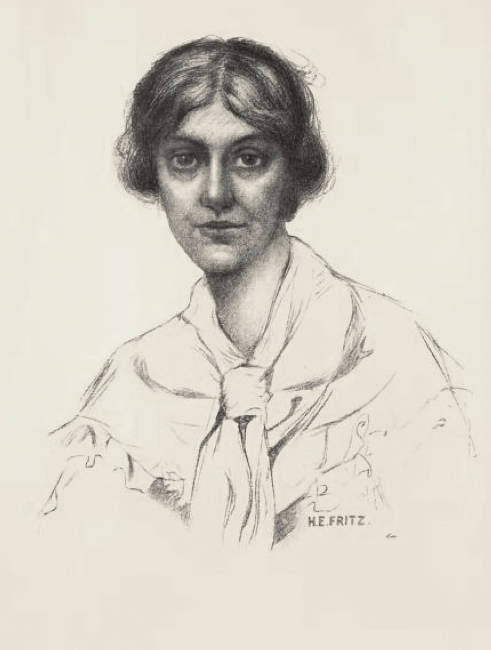
- Born: Appleton, Canada West
- Occupations: novelist, short-story writer
- Writing career
- Pen name: Adeline Margaret Tesky

Adeline Margaret Tesky (c. 1855 - 21 March 1924) was a Canadian novelist and short story writer.

== Biography ==
Tesky was born in Appleton, a community within the town of Mississippi Mills, Ontario. Her father was Thomas Appleton Tesky a farmer, and her mother was Elisabeth Kerfoot. She attended Genesee College in Lima, New York. She remained single throughout her life. Tesky died of a stroke on March 21, 1924.

== Career ==
Starting in 1900, Tesky taught for two years at Alma Ladies' College in St. Thomas, Ontario. She then became a full-time writer, writing seven novels between 1901 and 1913. Tesky also contributed a number of short stories and poems to various magazines and publications. Her stories regarding rural, farm life are in the style of the kailyard school.

== Bibliography ==
- Where the Sugar Maple Grows (1901)
- The Village Artist (1905)
- Alexander McBain, B.A., Prince in Pernury (1906)
- A Little Child Shall Lead Them (1911)
- The Yellow Pearl: a Story of the East and the West (1911)
- The Little Celestial (1912)
- Candlelight Days (1913)

== Sources ==
- McMullen & Campbell, 'New Women: Short Stories by Canadian Women', 1900-1920 (1991), pp. 19–20
- Sandy Campbell, 'Change and the Kailyard: The Fiction of Adeline M. Teskey', Canadian Literature 127 (Winter 1990): 189-93
- Morgan, Henry, 'Canadian Men and Women of the Time' (1912)
- 'Woman's Who's Who of America (1914–15)'
- Watters, 'Checklist of Canadian Literature...1620-1960' (1970), p. 405
