= Tefft, Indiana =

- Unincorporated community
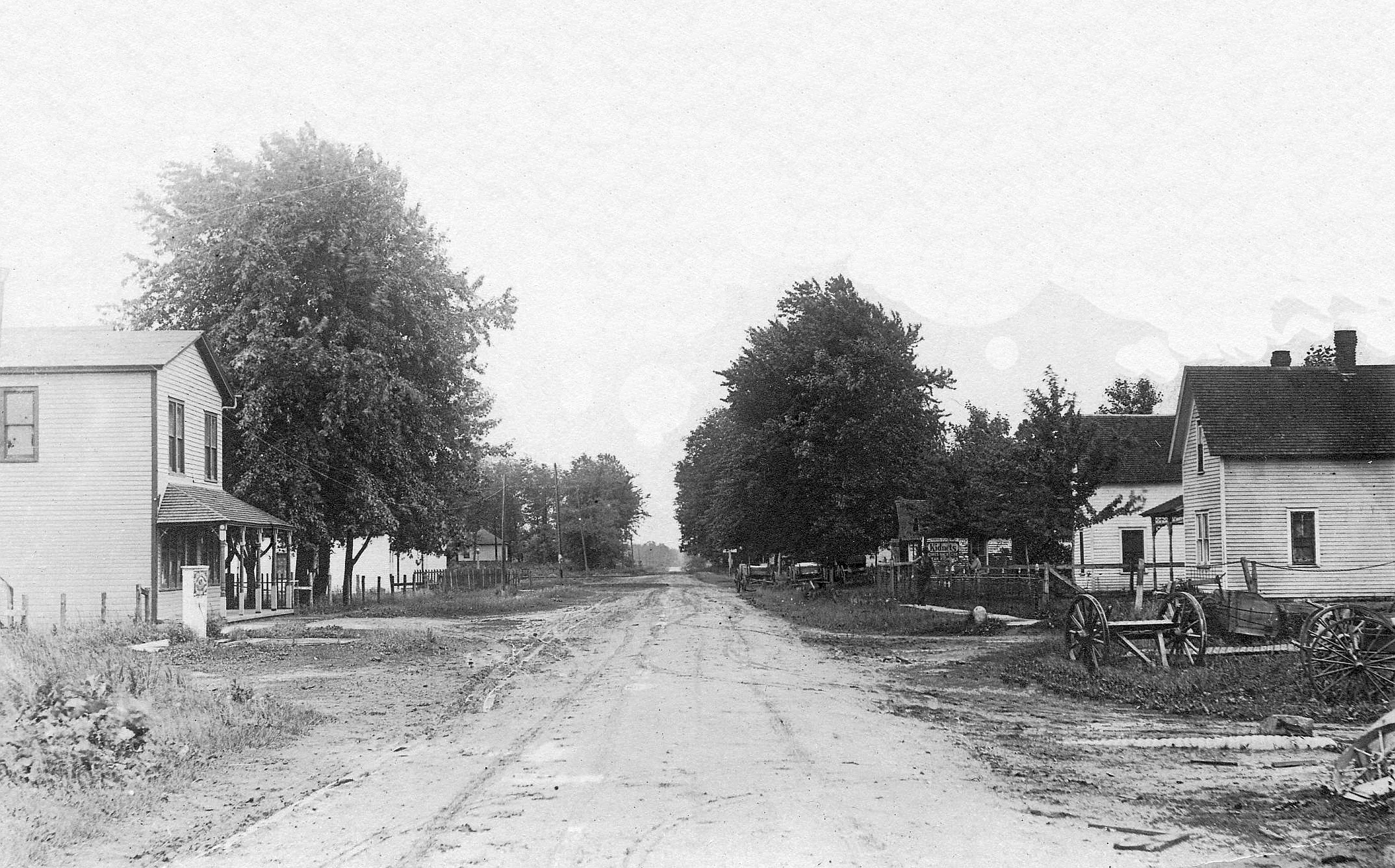
- Tefft c. 1910

- Location within Indiana Location within the United States
- Coordinates: 41°11′37″N 86°58′06″W
- Country: United States
- State: Indiana
- County: Jasper
- Township: Kankakee
- Elevation: 673 ft (205 m)
- ZIP code: 46380
- FIPS code: 18-75230
- GNIS feature ID: 444624

Tefft is an unincorporated community in Kankakee Township, Jasper County, Indiana, United States.

== History ==
Tefft was platted by Isaac Dunn in 1884, and named Dunnville. The name, however, became confused with Danville so Dunnville was renamed Tefft after Dunn's brother-in-law, Dr. Benjamin Franklin Tefft. Dunn also laid out a subdivision, Dunn's Original KKK Pleasure Resort, 2 miles (3 km) north of town, and was responsible for constructing Dunn's Bridge over the Kankakee River.

A post office was established at Tefft in 1883, and remained in operation until it was discontinued in 2003.
