= Joseph Cummings =

American academic (1817–1890)

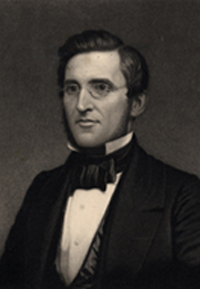

5th President of Wesleyan University
- In office 1857–1875
- Preceded by: Augustus W. Smith
- Succeeded by: Cyrus D. Foss

5th President of Northwestern University
- In office 1881–1890
- Preceded by: Charles Henry Fowler; Oliver Marcy (acting)
- Succeeded by: Henry Wade Rogers; Oliver Marcy (acting)

Personal details
- Born: March 3, 1817 Falmouth, Maine
- Died: May 7, 1890 (aged 73) Evanston, Illinois
- Resting place: Rosehill Cemetery
- Spouse: Deborah Haskell Cummings (m. 1843)
- Children: Mary Cummings; Alice Cummings
- Education: Wesleyan University
- Profession: Educator

Joseph Cummings (March 3, 1817 – May 7, 1890) was an American academic who served as the 5th president of Wesleyan University from 1857 to 1875, the 5th president of Northwestern University from 1881 to 1890, and the president of Genesee College (the predecessor of Syracuse University) from 1854 to 1857.

== Early life ==
Joseph Cummings was born on March 3, 1817, in Falmouth, Maine, to Reverend Cyrus Cummings, a Methodist minister, and his wife Elizabeth. Following in the footsteps of his father, Cummings devoted his early life to education and the promotion of Methodism. He worked to furnish the funds for his attendance at the Maine Wesleyan Seminary in preparation for his matriculation at Wesleyan University in Middletown, Connecticut in 1836. At Wesleyan, he was a member of the Eclectic Society of Phi Nu Theta, a fraternity founded at Wesleyan in part by Clark Titus Hinman, the first President of Northwestern University. After graduating from Wesleyan in 1840, Cummings was called to many teaching positions around New England, including the Amenia Seminary in Dutchess County, New York (1840–1843). Erastus Otis Haven, another President of Northwestern University (1869–1872) taught at the Amenia Seminary just three years after Cummings left the seminary. After he finished his time at Amenia, Cummings married Deborah Haskell (1816–1900) in 1843, with whom he adopted two daughters.

== College presidencies ==
In 1854, Cummings was appointed President of Genesee College in Lima, New York (now Syracuse University), a position he kept for three years until being called to the presidency of his alma mater, Wesleyan University, in 1857. Cummings taught moral and mental philosophy while at Wesleyan, which allowed him to mix his two greatest preoccupations, teaching and preaching. "Cummings' Wesleyan presidency spanned the Civil War, during which 133 students left Wesleyan to join the Union Army, and several others left to join the Confederate Army. Despite this disruption, Cummings supervised the construction of several buildings, including Rich Library (now the Patricelli '92 Theatre), Memorial Chapel, and Orange Judd Hall. He also enlarged the school's curriculum - particularly in the natural sciences - and oversaw the admission of women, a policy maintained until 1909." Although he stayed on at Wesleyan as a teacher until 1878, Cummings relinquished the presidency of the university in 1875 so he could focus more on his preaching. He took up full-time preaching again in 1878 and continued to travel the country giving sermons until he was asked to become the President of Northwestern University in Evanston, Illinois in 1881.

=== Northwestern University ===
Cummings' time at Northwestern (1881–1890) was marked by expansion of the campus, construction of many new buildings, and a greater level of financial solvency than Northwestern had previously known. Cummings was able to increase faculty salaries, pay off Northwestern's debt, and add new buildings to the Evanston campus (e.g. Fayerweather Hall of Science in 1881, Dearborn Observatory in 1889, and Hatfield House, a dormitory for men, in 1890). He was a noted teacher. Charles Henry Fowler, another President of Northwestern, had been his student at Genesee College, and a number of Northwestern professors—including Robert Cumnock and Herbert Fisk studied with or under him at Wesleyan.

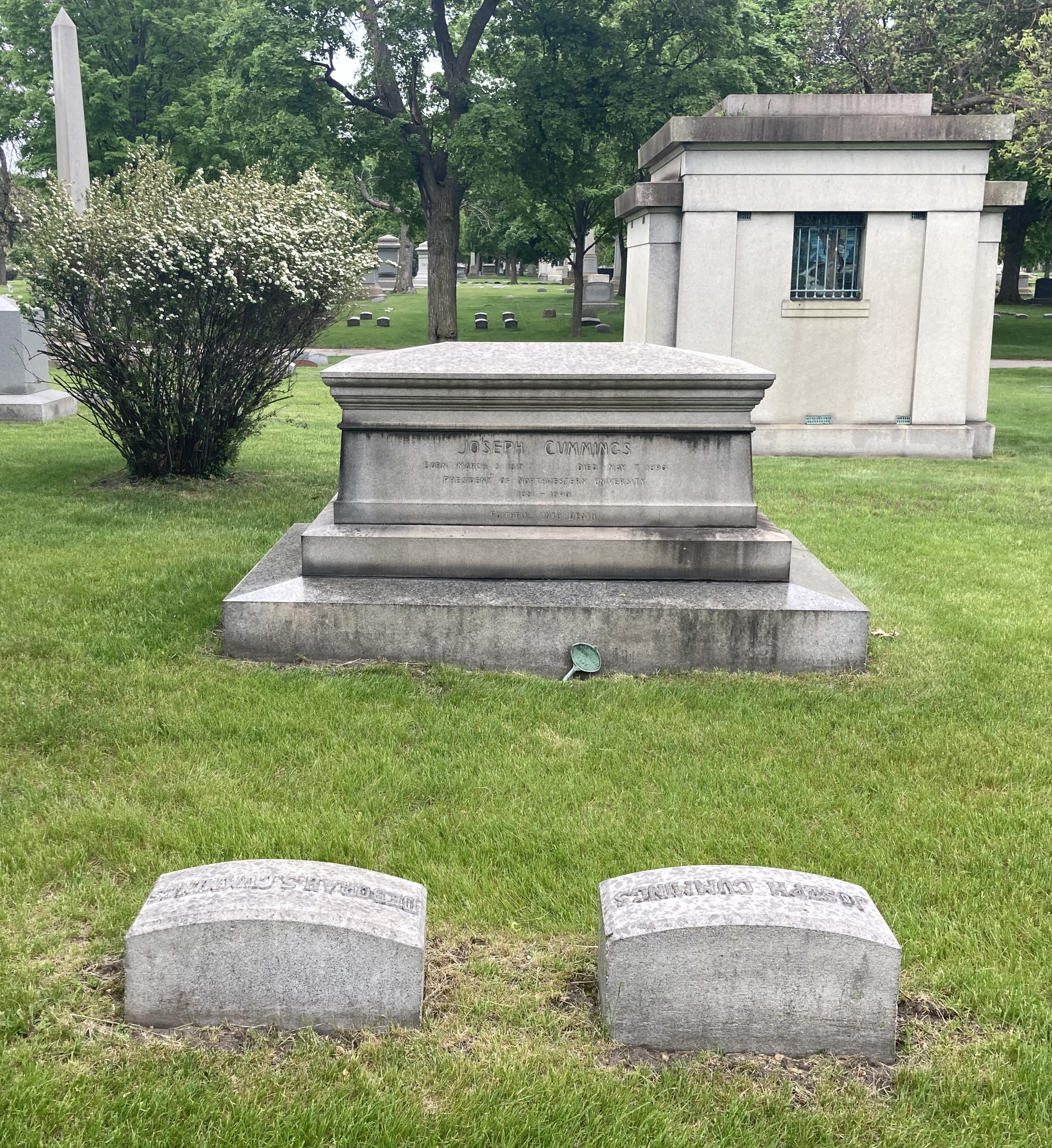
Cummings' grave at Rosehill Cemetery

During his lifetime, Cummings was widely recognized as a preeminent Methodist scholar and pastor, which is evident from the numerous honorary degrees he received for his good works. He was granted an honorary D.D. from Wesleyan University in 1854, another from Harvard College in 1861, and an L.L.D. from Northwestern University in 1866. When Cummings died on May 7, 1890, his funeral was well attended by prominent educators and ministers, and the eulogies given on his behalf were bound. He was survived by his wife, Deborah, who remained a trustee of Northwestern University until her death in 1900, and his two adoptive daughters, Mary (born in 1846) and Alice (1856–1932). Daniel Bonbright, Northwestern's Latin professor from 1856 to 1912 and President from 1900 to 1902, married Alice Cummings in 1890, and it was in their house that Joseph Cummings died.

Joseph Cummings and his wife Deborah Cummings are buried in Rosehill Cemetery in Chicago, Illinois.
