= Stan Ageira =

Indian novelist

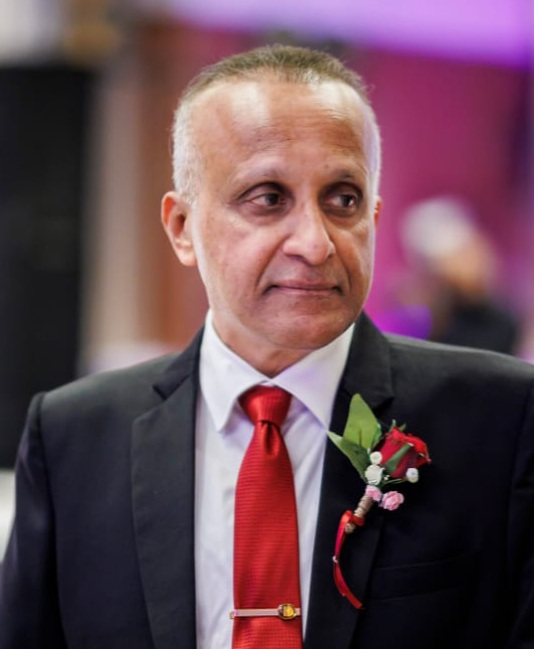
Stan Ageira (2022)

Stan Ageira (born 3 May 1961) is a writer from Mulki, a town near Mangalore, Karnataka, India. He is a popular Konkani language writer. He started writing at an early age of 14. He has written over 250 short stories and 18 novels in Konkani.

== Early life ==
Ageira is well known in the field of Konkani literature. His first short story was published in 1975. when he was barely 14. To date he has written over 250 short stories and 18 novels in Konkani. His father, the late Sgt. Ligoury Ageira, served the Indian Air Force for 35 years. Ageira was born and brought up in Mulki with his primary education was completed in Bethany convent, high school from Government Junior College, B.Com from Mysore University and MBA from IBAM New Delhi. He began his professional career in sales with Godrej Soaps Mumbai Branch in the early eighties before moving to Dubai in the 1990. Presently he is working and living in Dubai with his wife, Yvonne, and children, Sean and Elton.

== Literary works ==
Ageria was first recognized in the Konkani literary scene when he published Nalisay in 1983, and Asadhya. He has been recognized and presented awards from Goa Konkani Bhasha Mandal, Konkani Kutam Bahrain-2011, Daiji-Dubai 2014 Literary Award and Konkani Sahitya Academy, Karnataka for his novels. His novel Hi Moji Dhavnim won an AIKWO Award in 2014. He has published work to his credit in Konkani, Kannada and English. His Konkani column "Bindaas" in daijiworld.com was popular with Konkani readers. His collection of short stories in Konkani, Tambdi Mirsaang, published in 2006, was selected for the Karnataka Konkani Sahitya Academy Award. He is recipient of Dr.TMA PAI appreciation Award from Manipal for his anthology of short stories 'Cathillaacho Anamik' for the year 2021. His Devanagari‑script short‑story anthology 'Dhampallim Gaditham' received the Goa Academy Award for 2025. His short stories have been published in magazines like Woman's Era and Alive, published from New Delhi. He was awarded as the Konkani Story writer of 2008 by daaiz.com, a web portal which promotes Konkani literature. His short stories in English are also available in www.daijiworld.com's specially dedicated column under "Red Chillis."

On 20 March 2025, Ageria appeared on Daijiworld TV, on “Don Ghadi – Khushen Kadi Special with Stan Ageira”.

Current Project as Author and Screenwriter:

- The Black Magic (Feature Film, In Development)
- 90 Minutes (Feature Film, In Development)
- The Dark Past (Feature Film, In Development)

Book in English:

- Tea, Coffee, and Cheesecake

Published by Raider Publishing International (2010)

Selected short stories by Stan Ageira in English:

- "The Sugarcane Story"
- "The Goof-up"
- "Diamond Necklace"
- "Democracy v. Country"
- "A Perfect Funeral"
- "Three Women"
- "The Missing Money"
- "The Windfall"
- "Hit and Run Case"
- "Cash Van Robbery"
- "Prime Minister's Wife"
- "Anonymous from Cathill"
- "Red Chillis!"
