= Benjamin Franklin Tefft =

American diplomat

Benjamin Franklin Tefft (1813–1885) was an American Methodist minister, author, newspaper editor, and diplomat. As the American Consul in Stockholm, Sweden during the US Civil War, he encouraged and facilitated Swedish emigration to the United States, particularly his native state of Maine. This eventually resulted, for example, in the founding of the northern Maine immigrant community of New Sweden and its satellite Stockholm, Maine.

Tefft was born in Floyd, New York and attended Wesleyan University in Connecticut, graduating in 1835. In 1839-41, and again in 1858-61, he served as a Methodist pastor in Bangor, Maine, and later briefly in Portland. In between Tefft became a professor of Greek and Latin at DePauw University in Indiana, and then president of Genesee College in New York, which later became Syracuse University. The town of Tefft, Indiana was named for him.

== Consul in Stockholm ==
Tefft was appointed U.S. Consul in Stockholm in 1861 and Acting U.S. Minister to Sweden in 1862. It was largely through Tefft's influence and that of fellow Maine native and U.S. Consul in Gothenburg, Sweden, William W. Thomas, Jr., that beginning in 1864, a small portion of the soon-to-be-large Swedish migration to North America was directed to Maine. Tefft's lobbying resulted in the first grants by a state legislature in the United States designed to attract Scandinavian immigrants. Following the war Thomas would head a Maine immigration bureau and personally oversee the founding of the community of New Sweden. In the eyes of Tefft, Thomas, and the Maine politicians who voted subsidies to settle them, Swedish immigrants were a potential demographic buffer against the Catholic Irish and Francophone populations of Maine at a time when English and American immigration to the state had stopped. This Protestant and Nordic 'buffer' never materialized, however, as the Swedish colony remained relatively small and isolated, and many of its members ultimately intermarried with Maine's French and Irish populations. Tefft also served as immigration agent (while still U.S. Consul) for Lake Superior copper mining companies who also desired Scandinavian settlers. Tefft's son George V. Tefft eventually took over the Stockholm consulate as Tefft devoted increasing energy to private interests related to immigration.

== Later career ==
Tefft had returned to Bangor, Maine by 1873, where he edited the newspaper The Northern Border and continued a literary career that had begun in 1847 with the book Prison Life, and continued with Hungary and Kossuth in 1852 and Webster and his Masterpieces (a biography of Daniel Webster) in 1854. His major postwar book was Evolution and Christianity of 1885. Tefft's grandson Charles Eugene (1874-1951, b. in Brewer, Maine, a suburb of Bangor) would become a noted sculptor, some of whose bronze statues still decorate Bangor's parks.
