= Kankakee Township, Jasper County, Indiana =

Kankakee Township
- Township
- Location in Jasper County
- Coordinates: 41°12′18″N 86°59′52″W
- Country: United States
- State: Indiana
- County: Jasper

Government
  - Type: Indiana township

Area
  - Total: 25.97 sq mi (67.3 km^{2})
  - Land: 25.27 sq mi (65.4 km^{2})
  - Water: 0.7 sq mi (1.8 km^{2}) 2.70%
- Elevation: 663 ft (202 m)

Population (2020)
  - Total: 913
  - Density: 39.1/sq mi (15.1/km^{2})
- GNIS feature ID: 0453520

Kankakee Township is one of thirteen townships in Jasper County, Indiana, United States. As of the 2020 census, its population was 913 (down from 988 at 2010) and it contained 354 housing units.

Kankakee Township was established in 1856.

== Geography ==
According to the 2010 census, the township has a total area of 25.97 square miles (67.3 km^{2}), of which 25.27 square miles (65.4 km^{2}) (or 97.30%) is land and 0.7 square miles (1.8 km^{2}) (or 2.70%) is water.

=== Unincorporated towns ===
- Tefft

=== Adjacent townships ===
- Pleasant Township, Porter County (north)
- Dewey Township, LaPorte County (northeast)
- Railroad Township, Starke County (east)
- Cass Township, Pulaski County (southeast)
- Walker Township (southwest)
- Wheatfield Township (west)

=== Major highways ===
- Indiana State Road 10
- Indiana State Road 49

== Education ==
Kankakee Township residents are eligible to obtain a free library card from the Jasper County Public Library.

Kankakee Valley schools serve township residentshttps://kv.k12.in.us/en-US
