= Grand Kankakee Marsh =

Wetland in Indiana and Illinois, United States

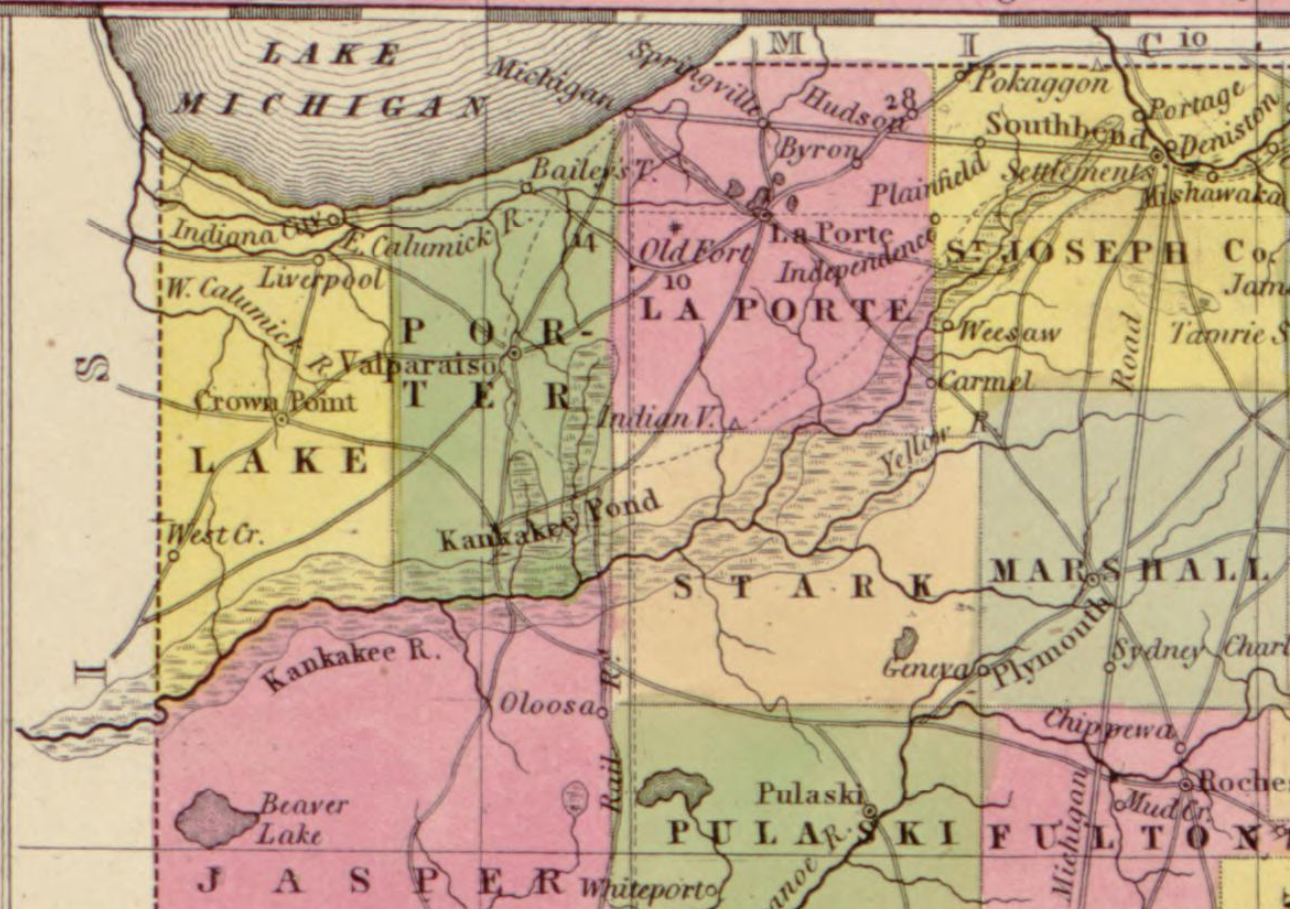
- The marsh depicted on an 1849 map of Indiana
- Interactive map of Grand Kankakee Marsh
- Location: Northern Indiana and Northern Illinois, US
- Coordinates: 41°17′48″N 86°46′05″W
- Max. length: 90 miles (140 km)
- Max. width: 20 miles (32 km)

The Grand Kankakee Marsh (or Great Kankakee Marsh or Kankakee Marsh) of northern Indiana and northern Illinois was one of the largest wetlands and freshwater marshes in the contiguous United States, and was frequently referred to as "The Everglades of the North". The marsh was formed by melting glaciers during the Late Pleistocene, approximately 13,000 to 16,000 Years Before Present (YBP). It was the home of Indigenous nations for thousands of years until the Indian Removal Act in the 19th century.

The marsh existed within the Kankakee River drainage basin's 5,165 square miles (13,380 km^{2}). Its estimated size ranged between 400,000 acres (160,000 ha) to over 1 million acres (404,686 ha) across 1,600 square miles (4,100 km^{2}), and its main tributary, the Kankakee, was over 240 miles (390 km) long with over 2,000 meander bends. Its flat elevation of 1.3 feet per mile (0.25 m/km) maintained the land wet most of the year.

The Kankakee Marsh was a mosaic of marsh, swamp, bog, fen, forest, prairie, wet meadow, oak savanna, and barren vegetation. Countless fish, reptiles, amphibians, insects, invertebrates, birds, and semi-aquatic mammals inhabited the marsh. Its habitats consisted of vast, open stretches of shallow water with island ridges, aquatic plants (e.g., cattails, wild rice), shrubs (e.g., willows, dogwoods), and trees (e.g., maples, oaks). Notable features included English Lake, formed by the confluence of the Kankakee and Yellow rivers, and Beaver Lake, the largest lake in Indiana until the 1880s. The marsh provided spawning grounds for fish from the Illinois River.

American settlers, syndicates, land speculators, and the Indiana General Assembly gradually destroyed the marsh between 1882 and 1917 by channelizing rivers and streams. The Kankakee River became one of the largest drainage ditches in the U.S. The draining of the marsh turned it into a major agricultural region, enabling its nine counties in 2022 to generate over $1.6 billion from crop revenues and over $847 million from livestock revenues.

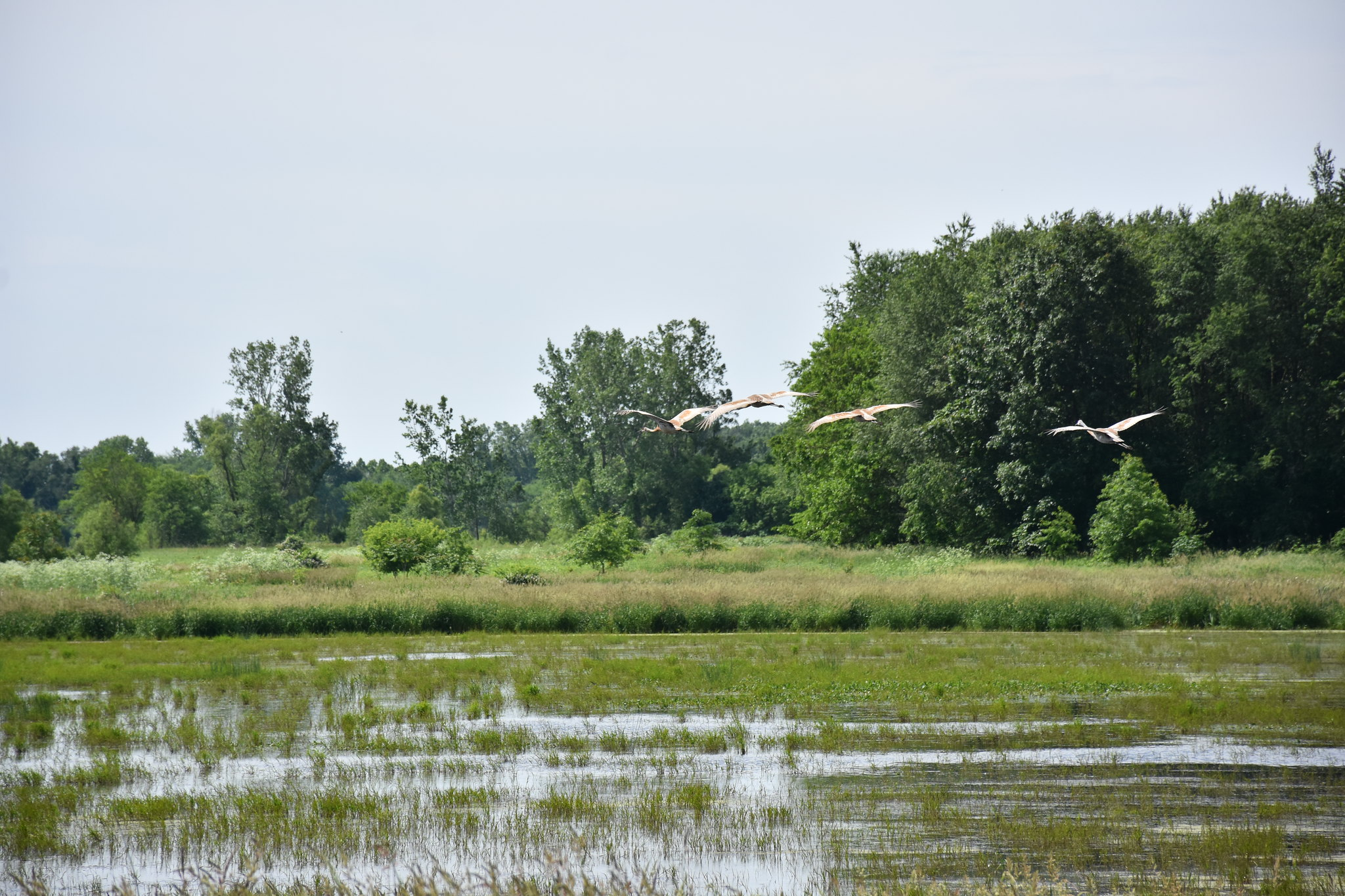
A former Kankakee Marsh wetland restored by the Pokagon Band of Potawatomi Indians. Bird populations used to be so numerous in the marsh that they would darken the sky. The total destruction of the marsh caused the loss of one-fifth of the migratory bird population of the United States.

The channelization of the Kankakee River has caused serious environmental issues over the last century, including floods and erosion. Siltation, suspended solids, nutrient pollution from farm runoff, and other issues have degraded water quality, requiring state and community partnerships to invest millions of dollars in soil and water conservation and stabilization programs. Extreme fluctuations in high and low flow water levels have degraded the environment and reduced wildlife habitat, causing significant biodiversity loss.

The destruction of the Grand Kankakee Marsh contributed to Indiana's total wetland losses of 87%. Its history exemplifies how Indigenous peoples were forcibly removed and ecosystems destroyed for development. The marsh's history of destruction is similar to that of Tulare Lake in California, and the Great Black Swamp in Indiana, Ohio, and Michigan. Scientific understanding about wetland ecology has grown since the 1970s, increasing public attention on the economic, environmental, and public health values of wetlands like the Grand Kankakee Marsh. This attention has contributed to important policies on wetland conservation (both American and international), natural resource management, wildlife conservation, and global efforts to prevent forced Indigenous removal, pollution, resource depletion, environmental degradation, ecocide, ecosystem collapse, and extinction caused by humans.

== Natural history of the marsh ==
=== Geology and hydrology ===
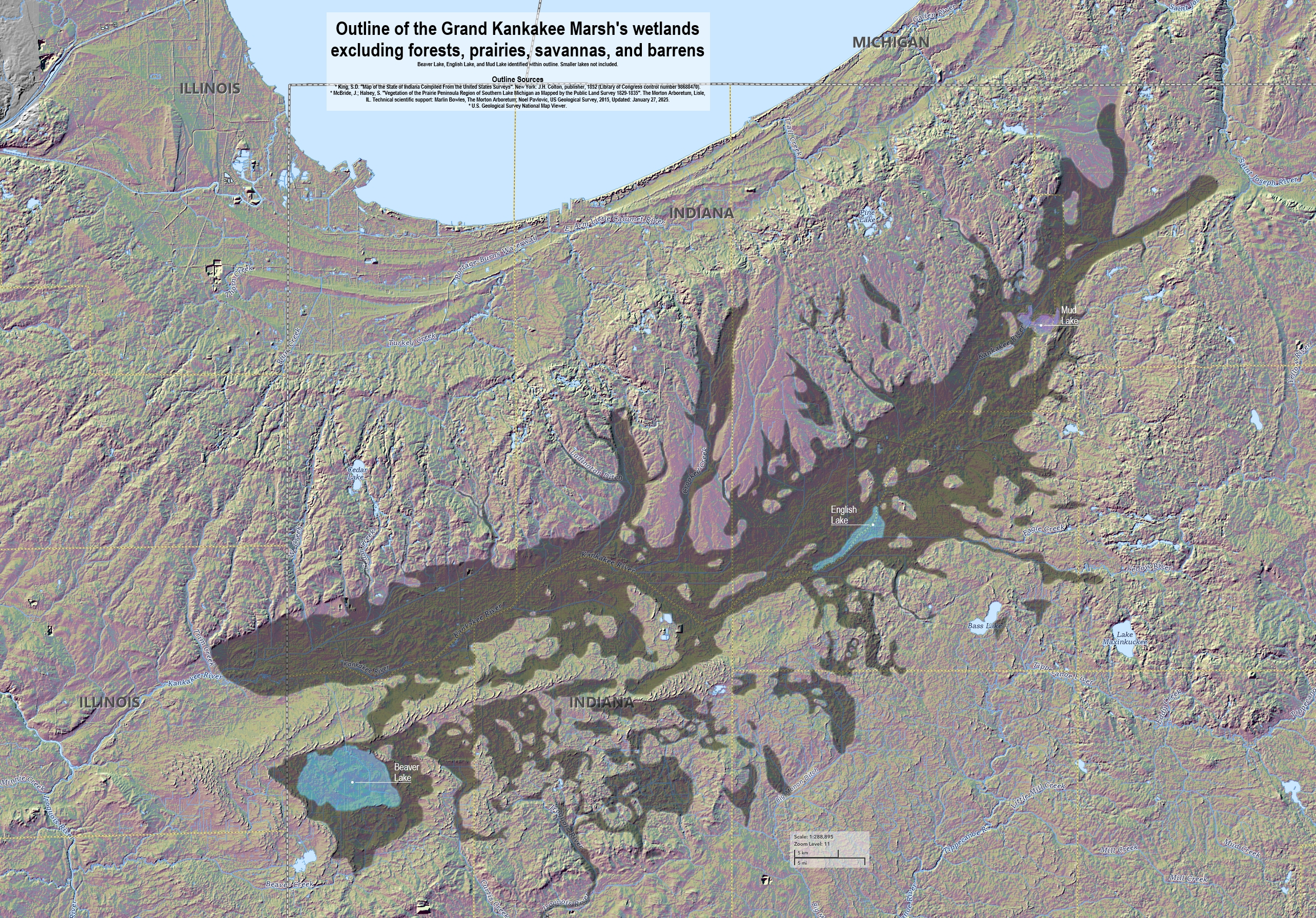
A Lidar-based DEM showing the Kankakee Marsh's terrain, shaped by the Laurentide ice sheet. The marsh existed on the drained Kankakee Outwash Plain and lacustrine plain, between the gravel-depositing Valparaiso, Iroquois, and Maxinkuckee Moraines.

The Grand Kankakee Marsh developed on the till plains and moraines left by the retreating Laurentide ice sheet in northern Indiana and northern Illinois following the Last Glacial Maximum 24,000 Years Before Present (or YBP). During the Late Wisconsin Episode's Woodfordian Substage (20,000–14,000 YBP), deposits of diamicton, limestone, shale, and dolomite fragments across the Kankakee till plains resulted in silt clay-loam to clay soils. The Kankakee River Basin's bedrock is primarily Silurian and Devonian. Freshwater flows through dolomite and limestone Silurian-Devonian aquifers within the Kankakee Arch.

The Kankakee Torrent (19,000 YBP) occurred when the ice sheet discharged large volumes of meltwater. This mega-flood deeply eroded earlier valley deposits of clay, silt, gravel, and sand, depositing thick outwash later reworked by wind, along with sand from the Valparaiso Moraine, into aeolian dunes. The torrent also redirected the Illinois River and formed Lake Chicago (14,000–11,000 YBP), which developed between the ice and the Valparaiso Moraine as the Lake Michigan ice lobe retreated.

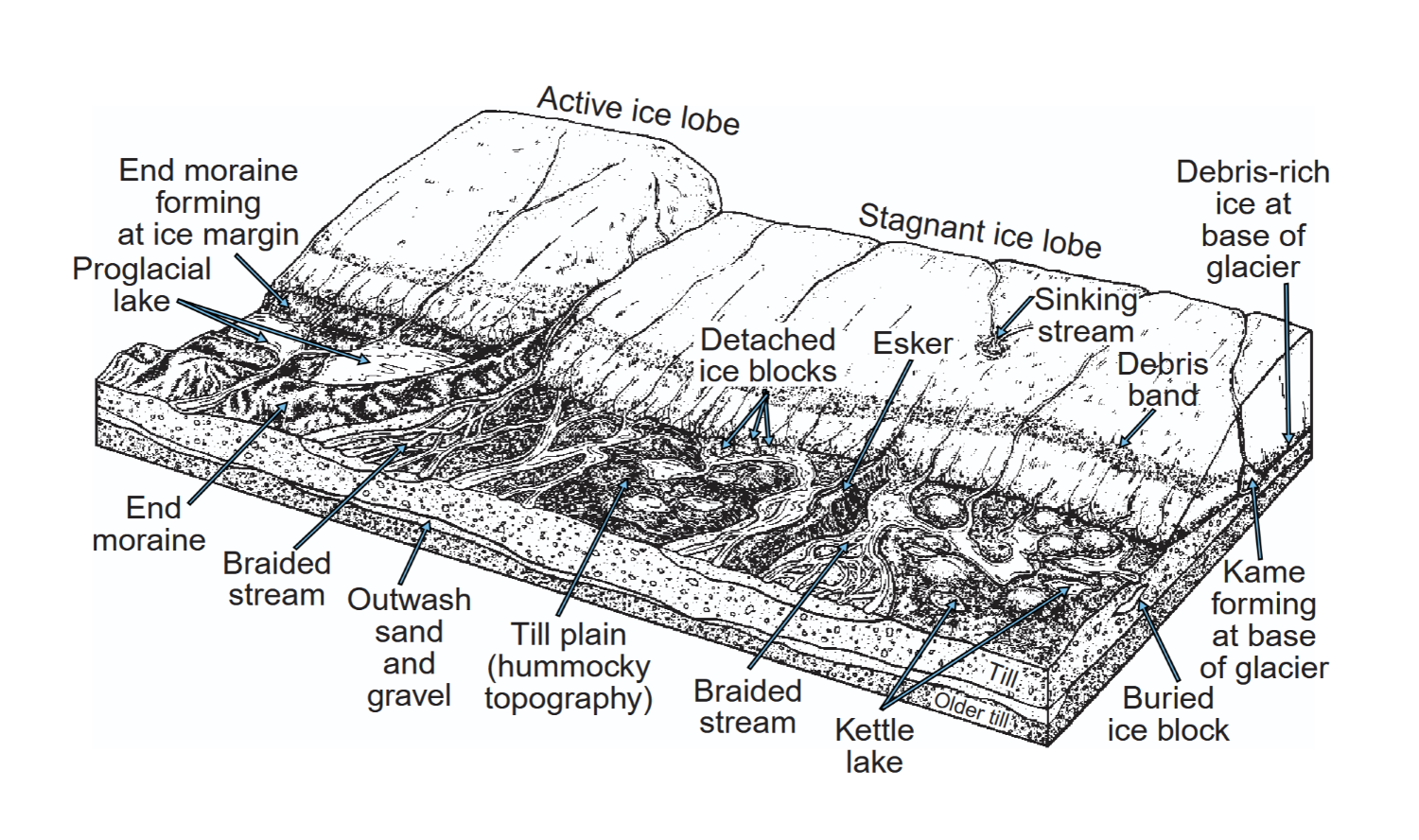
How a melting glacier shapes a moraine, a lacustrine plain, a proglacial lake, and other landforms. Lake Chicago, Lake Kankakee, and the Kankakee Marsh developed from these geological features.

Lake Kankakee developed within the Kankakee valley 14,000 YBP, likely consisting of a shallow lake or a series of wetlands. Its sand dune region covered 3,000 square miles (7,800 km^{2}), with water levels reaching 40 feet (12 m) above the present-day Kankakee River.

Isosatic rebound caused the Earth's crust to uplift, draining the Great Lakes until 3,000 YBP. The natural draining of Lake Kankakee exposed a nearly flat bedrock surface covered by thin Pleistocene drift, with outwash sand and gravel prevailing over lacustrine deposits.

Peat formed in glacial lake basins, between sand dunes, and within ancient meander channels and kettles. Sand and gravel beds formed aquifers as modern soil developed 14,000–13,000 YBP.

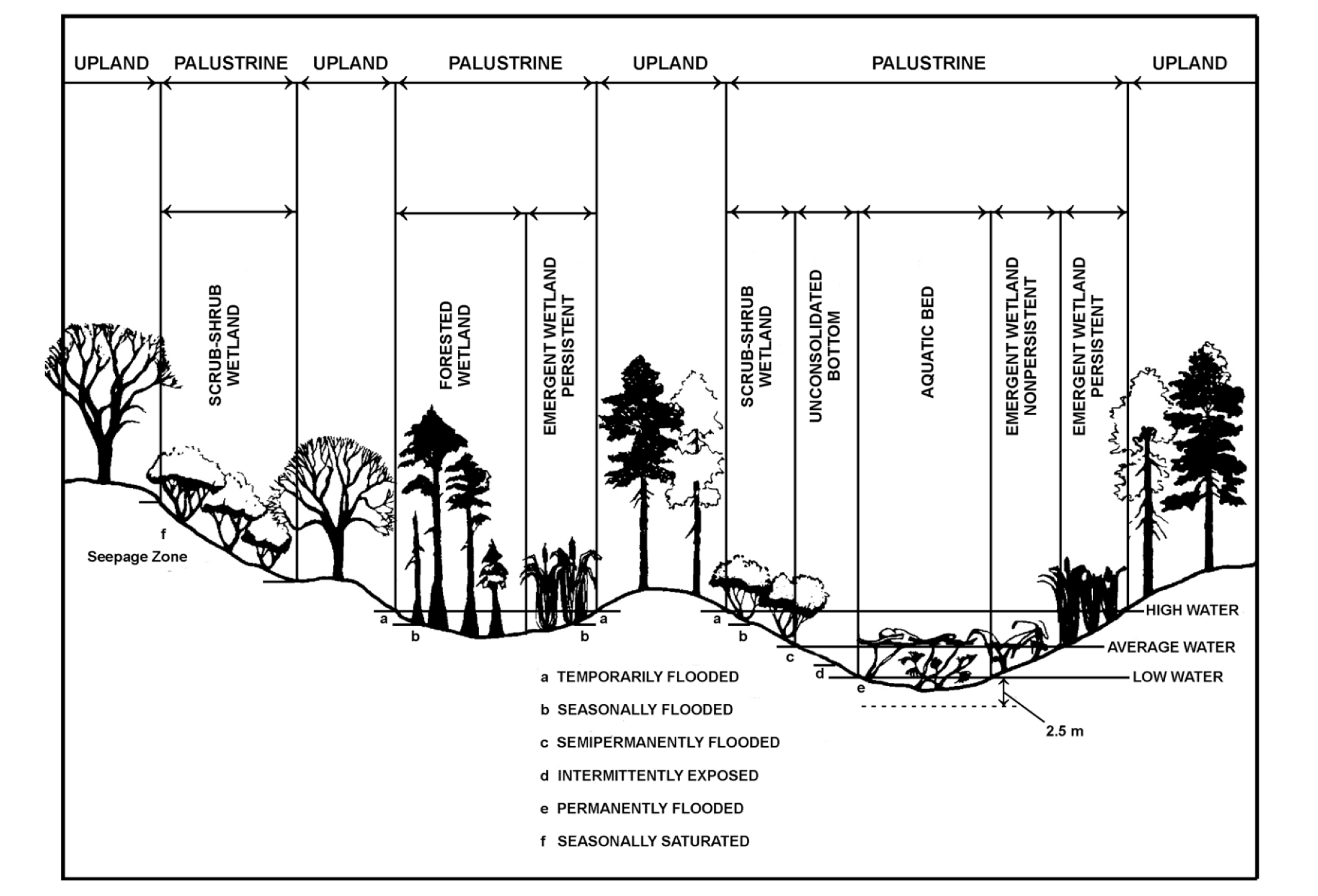
How terrain impacts wetlands. A glacier shaped the Kankakee Marsh's terrain, which developed wetlands, forests, prairies, and savannas.

The 8.2-kiloyear event, a rapid drop in global temperatures, induced two phases of wind-blown loess deposition across northern Indiana and northeast Ohio from 8,950 to 8,005 YBP. Loess was rich with freshwater fossil shells. Marl deposits consisted of shells from Physa, Planorbis, Unio, and other mollusk species. Drift levels vary by county, reaching depths of up to 38 feet (12 m). Blue glacial till existed 10–40 feet (3.0–12.2 m) below the sand.

The Kankakee Marsh's headwaters featured knob and kettle topography. Higher elevations contained organic-rich lacustrine deposits of muck, gravel, marl, and peat, while lower elevations toward the Illinois border exhibited sand-gravel alluvium and glaciofluvial valley trains. These trains comprised stratified loamy to coarse sand and gravel, often surmounted by aeolian dunes of well-sorted fine sand. Yellow River's confluence with the Kankakee, forming English Lake, contained fine, yellow sand.

A Lidar DEM of Beaver Lake circa 1800s. It was Indiana's largest lake and located within the Kankakee Marsh. Bogus Island, in Beaver Lake's center, was covered with black cherry, and the surrounding marshes and sand ridges consisted of oak groves and prickly pear cacti.

Other major lakes in the marsh included Mud Lake (St. Joseph, LaPorte counties) and Beaver Lake (Newton County). Beaver Lake was Indiana's largest lake and measured 7 miles (11 km) long, 5 miles (8.0 km) wide, and 6–9 feet (1.8–2.7 m) deep, and covered 40,000 acres (16,000 ha) with wetlands.

Sand ridges and hills formed irregular belts 1–2 miles (1.6–3.2 km) wide and 10–40 feet (3.0–12.2 m) high, creating islands across the undulating landscape.

Near the Illinois border and Beaver Lake, limestone thickens and creates a ledge in the Kankakee River at Momence. This ledge was considered to be a natural dam, backing up river waters and facilitating the development of marsh soils with minerals and trace elements.

Historians noted how the meandering Kankakee River "writhed and twisted and turned back upon itself in a series of startling zigzag movements" across 300 miles (480 km). Father Stephen Badin documented over 2,000 meander bends along the 240-mile (390 km) stretch from South Bend to Momence. An engineering survey in 1871 also confirmed 2,000 river bends. Oxbow lakes formed by the river's meander bends became wetlands or filled with silt.

A 1981 geological study confirmed the Kankakee River's meandering length was 250 miles (400 km), with elevation dropping from over 700 feet (210 m) at the headwaters to 600 feet (180 m) at the Illinois border.

The Kankakee River's average speed was approximately 1.5 miles per hour (2.4 km/h), allowing terrace swamps to form. Deep gravel deposits in sand and till caused streams to flow sluggishly.

Historical size estimates of the Kankakee Marsh range from 400,000 acres (160,000 ha) to over 1 million acres (404,686 ha). Its small islands were 1–3 acres (0.40–1.21 ha), its flat elevation was 5–18 inches per mile (7.9–28.4 cm/km), and its floodplain was 85 miles (137 km) long and 3–5 miles (4.8–8.0 km) wide under 1–5 feet (0.30–1.52 m) of water. Spring floods caused the marsh to expand 1–5 miles (1.6–8 km) from the Kankakee River for eight to nine months annually. Other estimates of the marsh's width were 20 miles (32 km).

Sandy deposits dominated the marsh, with localized exposures of boulder clay and glacial till along the borders of Starke and Jasper counties. These clay deposits formed basins for small lakes, such as English Lake at the confluence of the Kankakee and Yellow Rivers.

The Kankakee riverbed consisted primarily of sand and gravel. Water hardness levels were over 300 ppm (mg/L) within the Kankakee River's overflow boundaries. The waters of its adjacent tributaries, including the Yellow and Tippecanoe rivers, were described as clear and pure. The waters contained iron and other minerals. Wetlands contained carbonic acid, producing calcareous and chalybeate springs, and forming calcareous tufa and bog iron.

=== Fossils ===
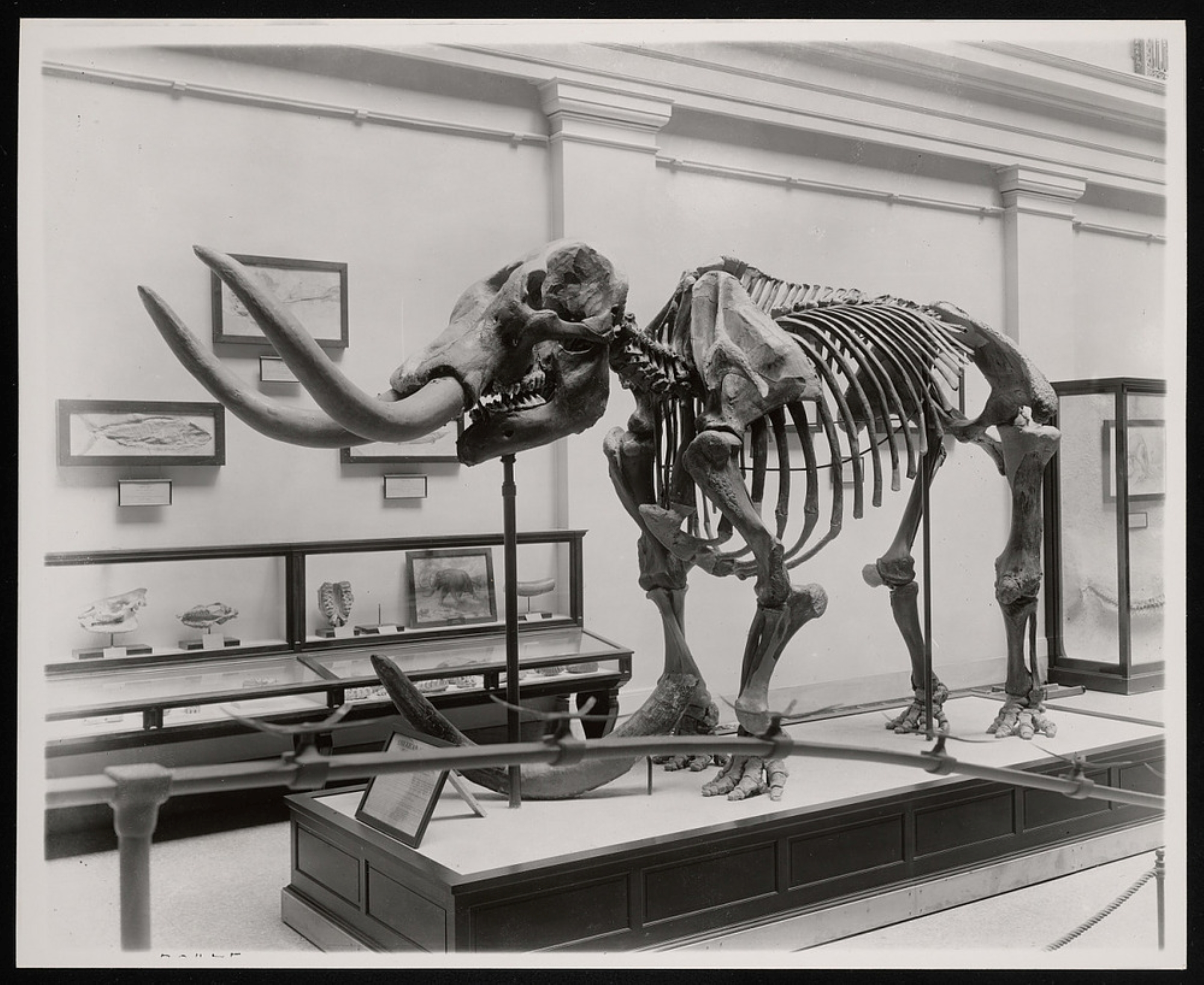
In 1915, the Smithsonian collected a complete mastodon skeleton from the Kankakee Marsh.

During the 19th and 20th centuries, Late Pleistocene and early Holocene fossils discovered in the marsh included deer, elk, woodland muskox, horse, and mastodon. Muck, marl, and peat deposits preserved fossils of the extinct stag-moose.

In 1870, mastodon and muskox fossils were reportedly discovered during the draining of Beaver Lake. Mastodon fossils were discovered in the Kankakee Marsh within St. Joseph and Porter counties. Mastodon fossils were also found in the 19th century within the Kankakee Marsh in Porter County, near Hebron and Kouts.

Other notable fossils included woolly mammoth and giant beaver. Giant beavers were the marsh's ecosystem engineers until their extinction 10,000 YBP.

=== Climate and biodiversity ===
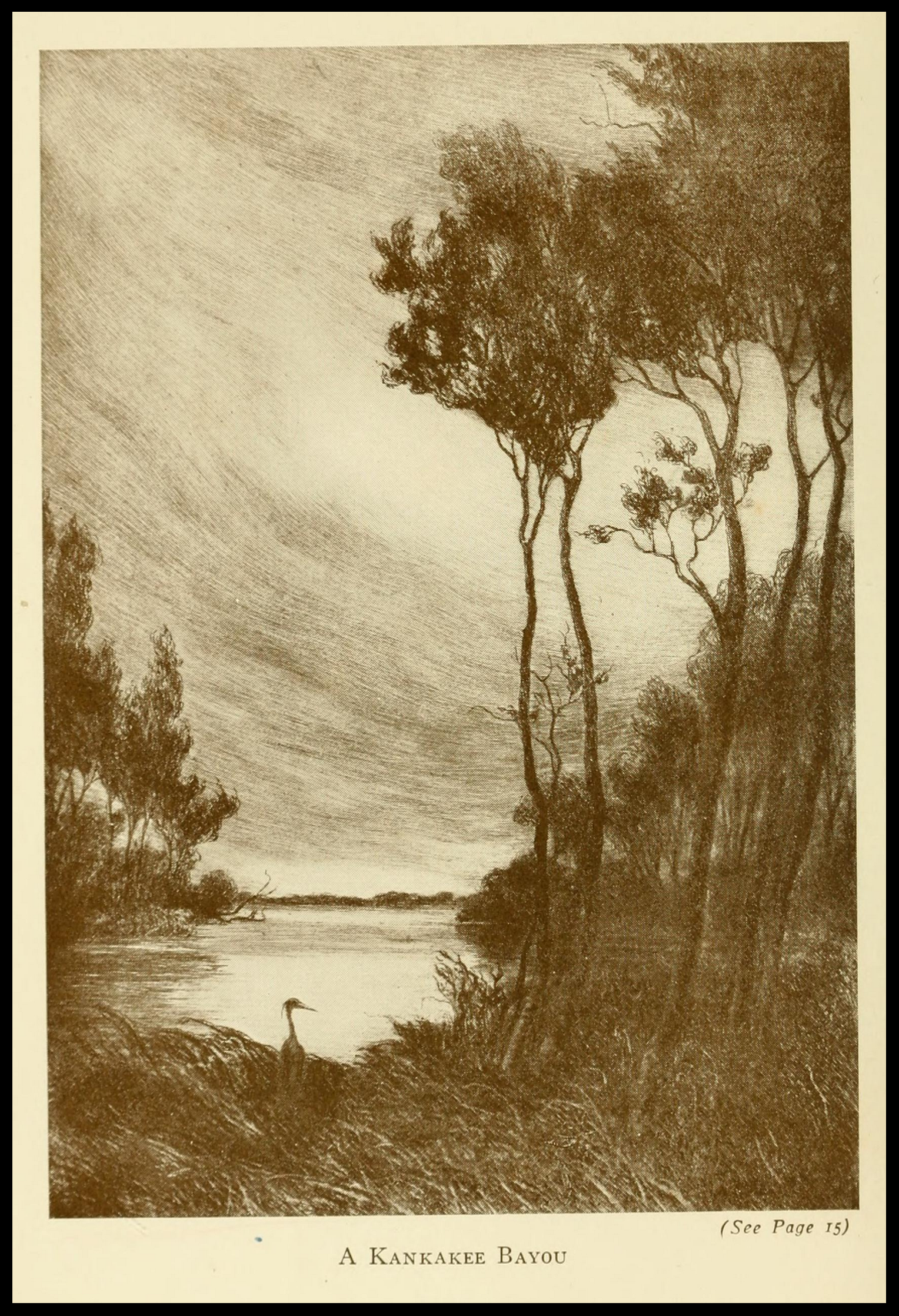
The Kankakee Marsh was home to a rich variety of vegetation and wildlife until the early 20th century.

Prior to modern Anthropogenic climate change, the Kankakee Marsh's paleoclimate was impacted by forces such as Milankovitch cycles, continental drift, and ocean currents. Proglacial lakes also influenced climate patterns as winds interacted with changing lake surfaces 14,200–10,500 YBP.

The Kankakee valley experienced arid conditions during the Bølling–Allerød Interstadial (14,690–12,890 YBP) and the Younger Dryas (12,900–11,700 YBP). Around 11,000 YBP, the climate transitioned from boreal to temperate. This shifted postglacial vegetation from open spruce forest-tundra to temperate deciduous forests, with deciduous trees supplanting conifers on the till plains by 9,800 YBP, followed by the development of open oak woodlands 8,000–4,000 YBP. Flora migrated through land connections, waterways, wind dispersal, or avian vectors.

By 6,000 YBP, precipitation and summer temperatures reached modern levels; by 3,000 YBP, northern hardwood forests, including oak-hickory, sugar maple, and beech were firmly established.

Early Holocene warming trends caused wildfires that triggered grassland expansion from central Illinois and Indiana toward Lake Michigan, though the Kankakee Marsh's wetlands served as a firebreak. Fires destroyed protective vegetation on sand dunes, leaving them vulnerable to wind erosion until vegetation regrowth stabilized shifting sand ridges. The first French explorers witnessed natural wildfires and fires set by Indigenous peoples for land modification in 1679.

The marsh persisted in a humid region east of the Mississippi, with its summer isothermal position placing it within the Dfa climate type of the Köppen system. The region has been described as a "Banana Belt", due to milder winters compared to surrounding areas. North of the Kankakee River featured high-moisture winds. In the 1830s, extreme winters and unseasonable colds killed wildlife and buried the region in deep snow, challenging early settlement.

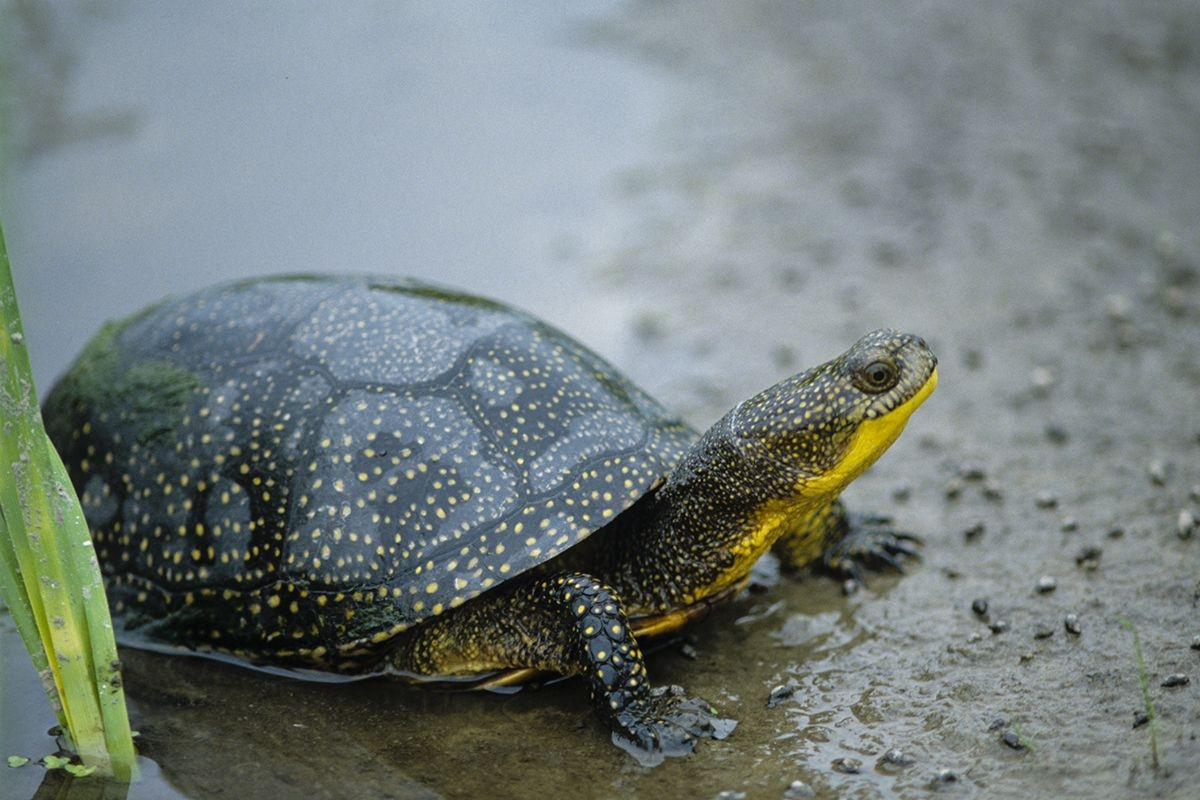
English Lake fostered Blanding's turtle (seen here), Eastern massasauga, Eastern glass lizard, and other reptiles.

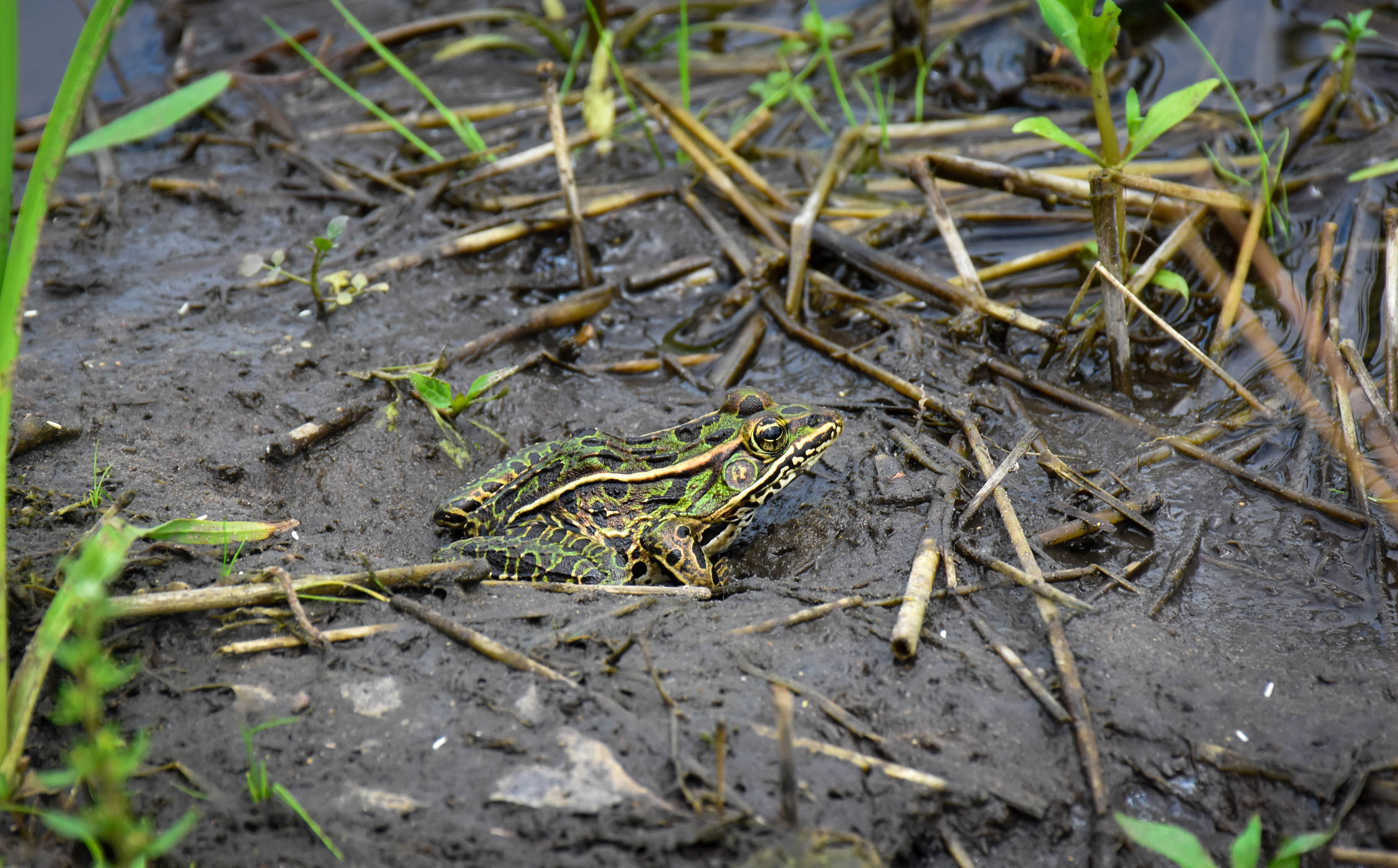
A northern leopard frog in a Starke County wetland. Oliver Perry Hay regarded it as the "commonest, best known, and most beautiful frog."

The Kankakee River's meandering floodplain created biodiverse ecosystems, including oxbow lakes and freshwater marshes with aquatic plants. It contained forested swamps, shrub swamps, alkaline fens, sphagnum bogs, vernal pools, wet meadows, and sloughs. River banks were very low and consisted of sand dominated by trees and vegetation. Prairies, oak savannas and barren vegetation prevailed in the marsh's headwaters.

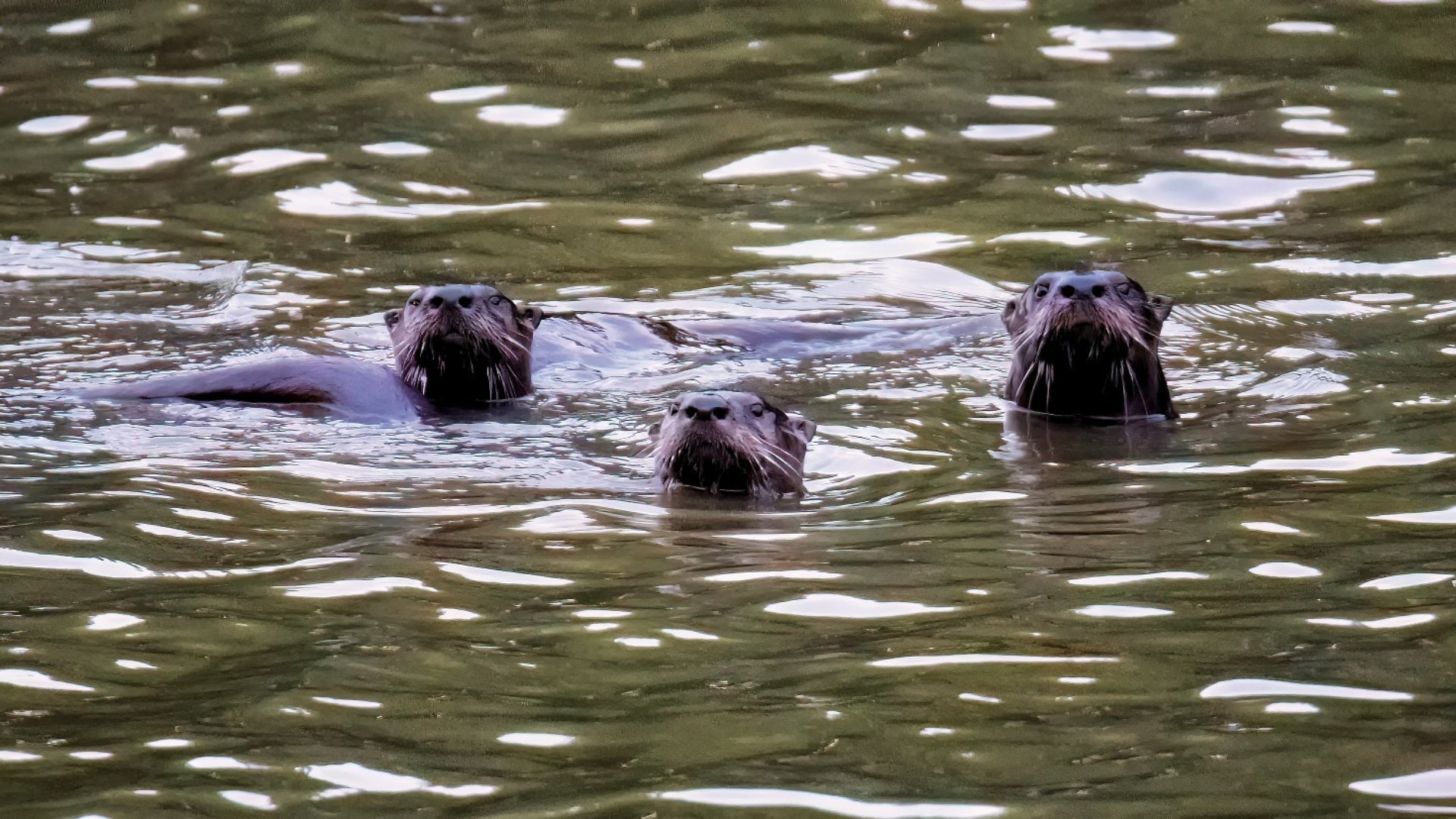
Otters thrived in the Kankakee Marsh, along with red squirrels, eastern meadow voles, prairie cottontails, and other mammals.

Shoreline fens and bogs would tremble the trees when humans walked across them. These floating peat mats provided critical nesting habitat for birds such as the pied-billed grebe.

Emerging sand ridges formed islands ranging 3–20 acres (1.2–8.1 ha), and rising 10–20 feet (3.0–6.1 m) above the wetlands. Other islands were a quarter-mile to one-and-a-half miles long. Islands lacked deep organic muck, resulting in stable, mineral-rich soils, and supported Fox grapes, wild plum, and star-flowered Solomon's seal. Localized acidic patches supported acid-tolerant (ericaceuous) plants.

Tamarack, hardwoods (e.g., oaks, maples), and shrubs (e.g., willows) existed in the marsh. Flora included black walnut, sloughgrass, red cedar, and Michigan lily.

Historic mammals observed in the marsh included coyote, eastern wolf, cougar, bobcat, gopher, beaver, muskrat, porcupine, and buffalo. Elk populations dwindled by the early 19th century.

Mollusks indicated healthy ecosystems in the marsh. In 1899, 63 different mollusk species were identified by geologists. Snails included Stagnicola reflexa and Lymnaea stagnalis, clams included Sphaerium and Pisidium, and mussels included Truncilla truncata (formerly Plagiola elegans) and Lampsilis alatus.

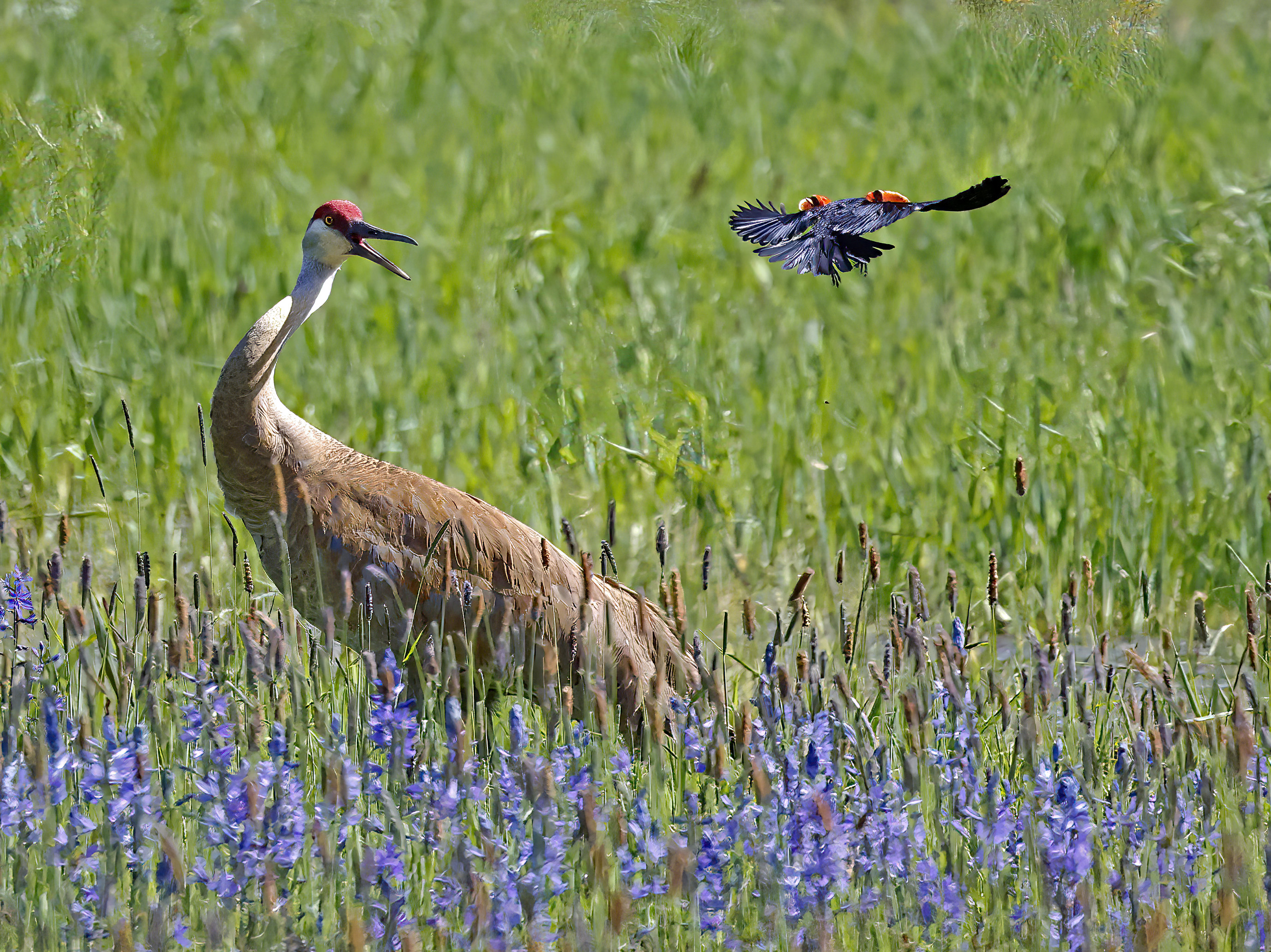
A sandhill crane and a red-winged blackbird. Sandhill cranes and whooping cranes resided in the marsh from spring to fall. Hunters called English Lake "Crane Heaven" and southeastern Lake County "Cranetown", due to their very large crane populations. Hunters observed great blue herons, black-crowned night herons, and American egrets in these areas.

Burrowing crayfish aerated wetland soils and cycled nutrients underground. The marsh's abundant fish species included green sunfish, rock bass, warmouth, and shortnose gar. Insects, including striped sedge grasshopper and oblong leaf-winged katydid, were key food sources for birds in the marsh.

Nineteenth century historians, naturalists, and hunters recorded over 225 bird species in the marsh, including permanent residents, seasonal visitors, and migratory birds. They included the prothonotary warbler, the most abundant summer species. Common species included large swarms of red-winged blackbird in grassy marshes, American golden plover in wet meadows, killdeer in dry prairies, Wilson's phalarope in marshes, American woodcock in open and forested bogs, and also American white ibis, whooping crane, and king rail. Prairie chickens bred in the wide, grassy wetlands.

Black terns were summer residents. Merganser, duck, wigeon, mallard, teal, and other waterfowl also resided in the marsh. Goldeneye and Canadian geese would remain in the marsh during winter. Yellowlegs visited the marsh during migration from their South American non-breeding sites. Wetlands such as English Lake nourished waterfowl with acorns, wild rice, and smartweed, among other marsh roots and grasses. Birds of prey, such as the bald eagle, lived regularly within the marsh and English Lake.

One of the most notable animals of the Kankakee Marsh was the passenger pigeon, which would block out the sun when they flew in flocks. One account recalled the species flying over Lake County, describing millions of birds foraging in woods and fields, and flying at all heights, darkening the sky "as if an eclipse were on."

== Human history of the marsh ==
=== Indigenous nations of the Kankakee Marsh region ===
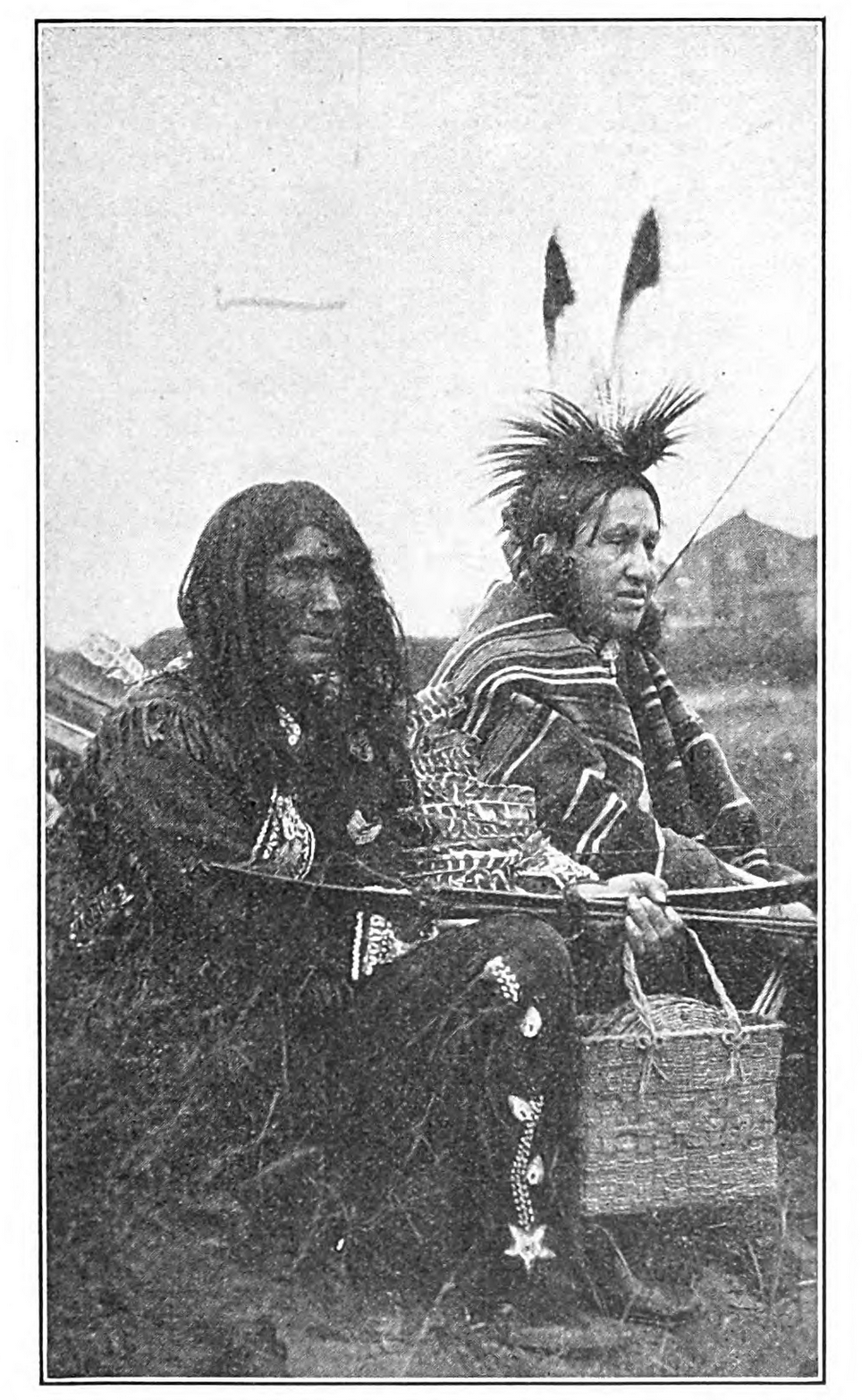
Haudenosaunee (left) and Potawatomi (right) men near the Kankakee Marsh

Evidence suggests the first Indigenous peoples, whom archaeologists call Paleo-Indians, lived in northern Ohio at least from 13,738 to 13,435 years Before Present (or YBP), and Clovis culture lived in southwest Michigan 13,000 YBP. Indiana's archaeological history dates to 10,400 YBP. The Collier Lodge site near the Kankakee River, in Porter and Jasper counties, contains artifacts spanning the last 11,000 years.

The history of Indigenous peoples (Native Americans, American Indians) in northern Indiana is marked by dramatic shifts in ecology and climate during the Late Pleistocene and early Holocene. Following the Younger Dryas, a warming period 10,800 to 10,000 YBP triggered conifer forests to transition to deciduous forests. Indigenous peoples migrated to wetlands created from drained proglacial lakes for more consistent resources. They hunted between the Great Black Swamp in northeastern Indiana and the Grand Kankakee Marsh. By 8,000 to 1,000 YBP, modern climate values slowly prevailed as contemporary flora and fauna emerged.

The Kankakee Marsh offered hunting and fishing, places for villages, and protection from enemies. Archaeological evidence in middens reveal pottery, arrow points, and the bones of animals early Indigenous people consumed (e.g., fish, turtle, deer, beaver, birds, and bears). The Griesmer site in Lake County by the Kankakee River contains artifacts from 2,100 years BCE to 1,500 CE.

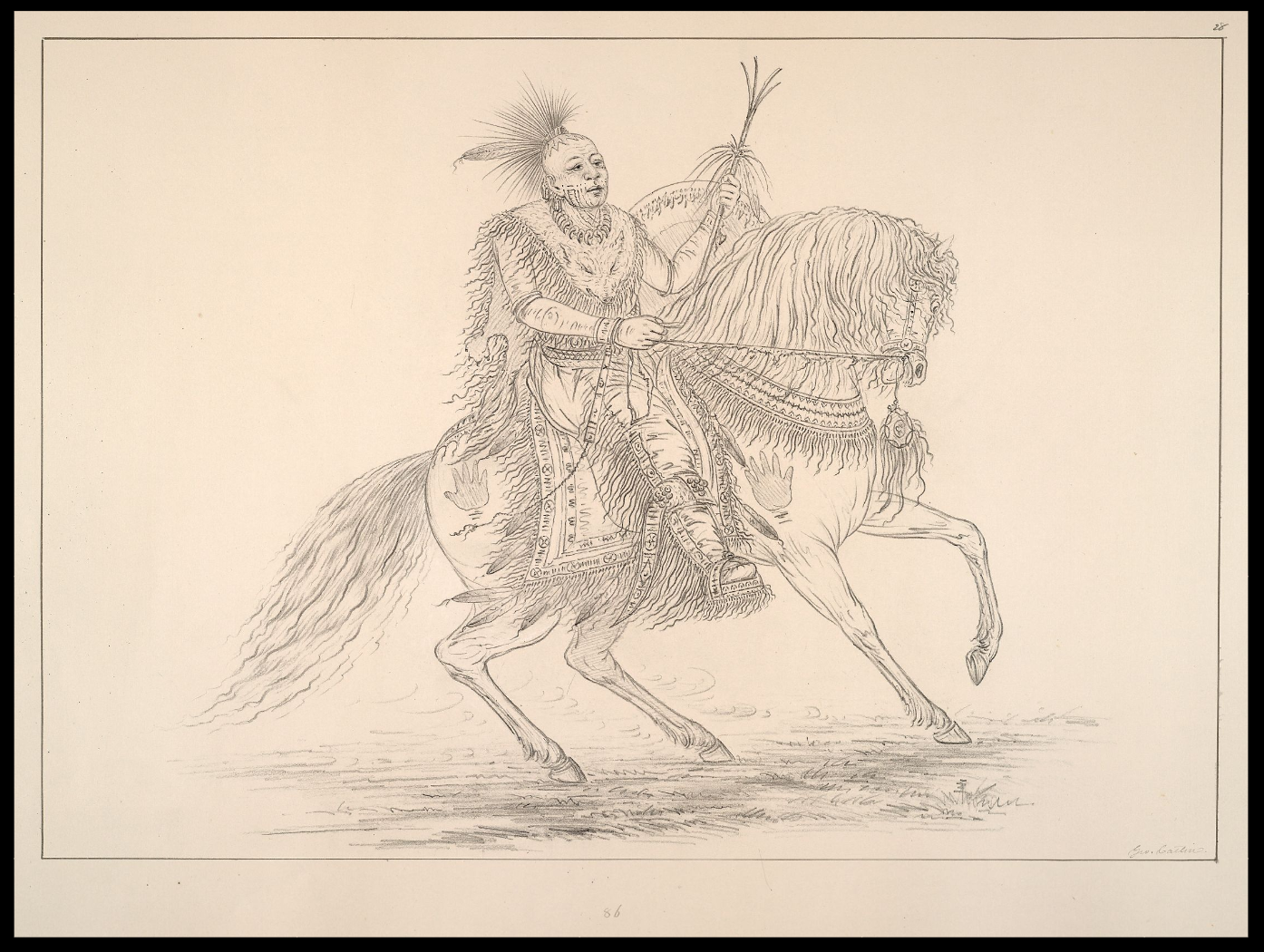
A Sauk drawn by George Catlin. The Great Sauk Trail traversed areas north of the Kankakee Marsh. After contact with Europeans, Indigenous peoples used horses within the marsh.

The Kankakee Marsh was home to the Kaskaskia, Kickapoo, Lenape, Mascouten, Meskwaki, Peoria, Piankeshaw, Potawatomi, Shawnee, Wea, and Miami. The Miami trace their origins to the mouth of the St. Joseph River in Lake Michigan, called Saakiiweeyonki, the "Coming Out Place". Languages consisted of Eastern Algonquian, Central Algonquian, and Siouan. Oneota peoples engaged with Algonquian-speaking visitors in the marsh, such as the Sauk and Menominee. Mohicans lived on islands in the marsh in 1721.

The Potawatomi, the "people of the place of the fire", were the region's majority, maintaining close cultural and linguistic ties to the Ojibwe and the Odawa. Kankakee Marsh inhabitants were known by historians as "Prairie Potawatomi." They burned soil for managing plants and crops, similar to modern burns. The Haudenosaunee challenged the region's Indigenous groups, eventually leading to the Potawatomi siding with the French, and the Haudenosaunee siding with the British during colonization. Fleeing Haudenosaunee attacks in Michigan during the 17th century, groups of Sauk, Fox, Kickapoo, Mascouten, Miami, and Potawatomi crossed the Kankakee and northwest Indiana regions to safely reach prairie and wild rice wetlands in Illinois and Wisconsin.

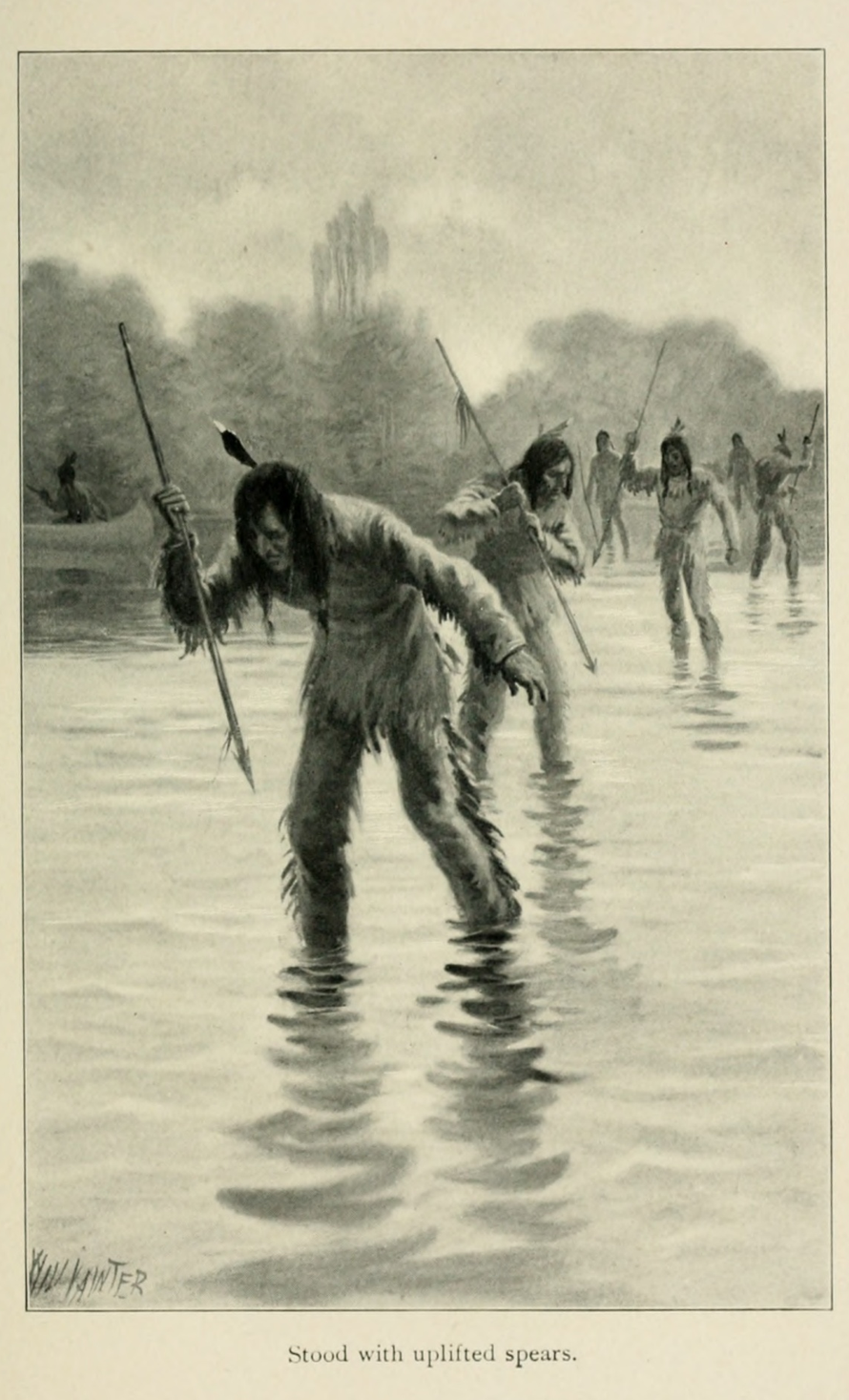
Indigenous peoples spearing fish in the Kankakee Marsh. Navigating the marsh developed their wayfinding skills and deep ecological knowledge.

The Potawatomi utilized the Kankakee River as a primary transit corridor, employing sophisticated birchbark canoes for navigation. Birchbark canoes were engineered for speed and durability, featured frames of birch, elm, hickory, or basswood, and came in various designs for use in specific bodies of water, from calm lakes to fast-moving rivers. According to Smithsonian historians Edwin Adney and Howard Chapelle, the canoes' advanced design and engineering skills showed "a long period of development must have taken place" before European contact.

Other modes of transport included horses and sleds. Horses were their primary domestic animal; they had no need for livestock as they fished and hunted game within the marsh. They also used ponies for travel.

Potawatomi villages, agricultural fields, and hunting grounds encompassed the Kankakee region. Diets from the marsh's vegetation included seasonal fruits and nuts, and maple sugar, while corn was cultivated in fields fertilized with pulverized fish and manure. One of their largest corn fields was located in present-day Wheatfield Township.

Indigenous nations shared the marsh for hunting. Game included small mammals (such as rabbits, beaver, and muskrat), large mammals (elk, bears, deer, and bison), birds (e.g., turkey, prairie chicken, and waterfowl), and fish (e.g., pike, bass, and sunfish). Other game included reptiles (e.g., Blanding's turtle), amphibians (e.g., American toad), and mollusks (e.g., purple wartyback).

Indigenous nations harvested wild rice in the marsh, a plant indicative of healthy, freshwater and robust biodiverse ecosystems. The Anishinaabe called wild rice manoomin, and viewed it as a sacred, important part of their identity, livelihood, religion, culture, and traditions. Substantial wild rice beds existed along the Kankakee River and in Beaver Lake, which was known in the Potawatomi language as Sag-a-yi-gan-nik-youg, or "Lake of the Beavers".

A Potawatomi woman from the Kankakee Marsh region (Crumstown, St. Joseph County).

Indigenous peoples used sandy, elevated ridges as high-ground islands for settlement, defense, and burial. Red Oak Island (LaPorte County) and Big White Oak Island (Lake County) could hold hundreds of people. Jackson's Island, or Indian Hill, was a prominent ridge until 19th-century drainage; the site is now adjacent to the Starke County Airport. The islands also provided security; for example, Curve Island near Shelby was fortified with defensive trenches during conflicts between Indigenous nations.

Ridges were also culturally significant burial sites, with some graves dating back 2,000 years. Indigenous people would bury the dead with funerary objects (e.g., weapons, ornaments, tools), and occasionally their dogs.

Villages featured council houses, dance grounds, and agricultural fields. People lived in wigwams around a village center reserved for ceremonies. Common possessions included breast plates, crosses, and ceremonial pipes.

First contact with 17th-century Europeans in the Kankakee Marsh included French explorers and Jesuit missionaries. Indigenous peoples, followed by French colonialists, British colonialists, and American settlers, influenced the Kankakee River's name. Some historians linked the original name — recorded as Thea-kiki, Huakiki, or Kankekiki — to "the land inhabited by wolves and river", with The-Ak (meaning wolf) and A-Ki (meaning land). Conversely, others interpret it as Ti-yar-ac-ke, meaning "wonderful land" in Potawatomi. In 1679, La Salle recorded the name as Teakiki. French explorers later modified it to Quin-que-que, which British explorers anglicized to Kankakee. There are at least 19 historical spellings of the name.

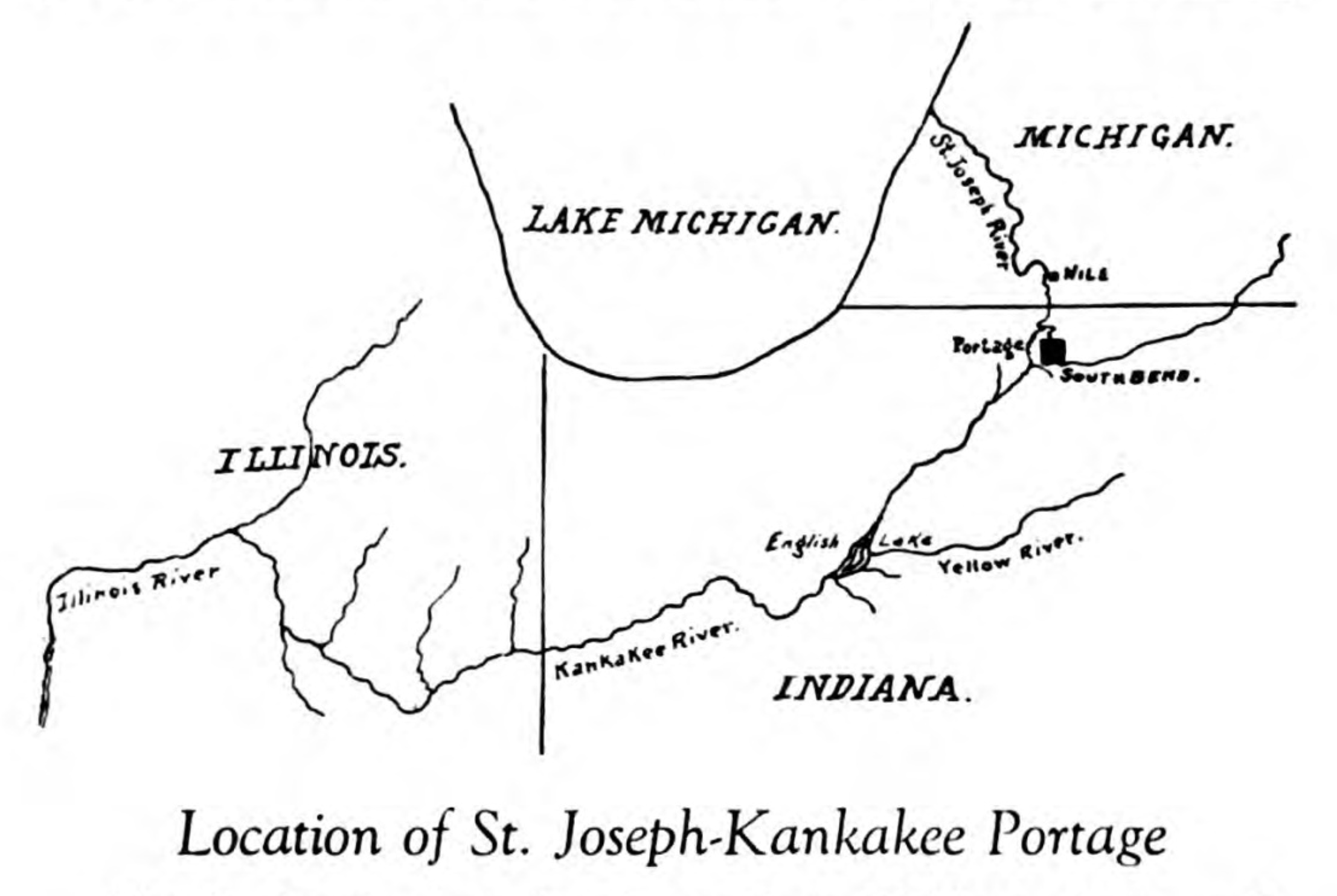
A critical portage connected the St. Joseph and Kankakee Rivers, part of a water trail between the Great Lakes and the Mississippi. Indigenous peoples utilized this route for generations before 17th-century fur traders.

The Kankakee Marsh served as the hunting grounds for regional forts and traders. Encounters between Indigenous peoples and Europeans during marsh hunts were often non-violent and mutually respectful.

The North American fur trade gave Potawatomi in the Kankakee Marsh financial strength in trading with Europeans. British and French, however, attempted to relocate the Wea and Miami to assert their colonial interests. Conflicts with Europeans foreshadowed the total destruction of the Kankakee Marsh and the later forced Indigenous removals by the Americans. Modern historians continue to debate whether these actions constitute ethnic cleansing or genocide.

During the late-18th century wars, wildlife populations rebounded while men fought each other in battlefields; hunters in the Kankakee region noted an abundance of game in 1790, following lower numbers in previous years.

=== Forced Indigenous removals and treaties for the marsh ===
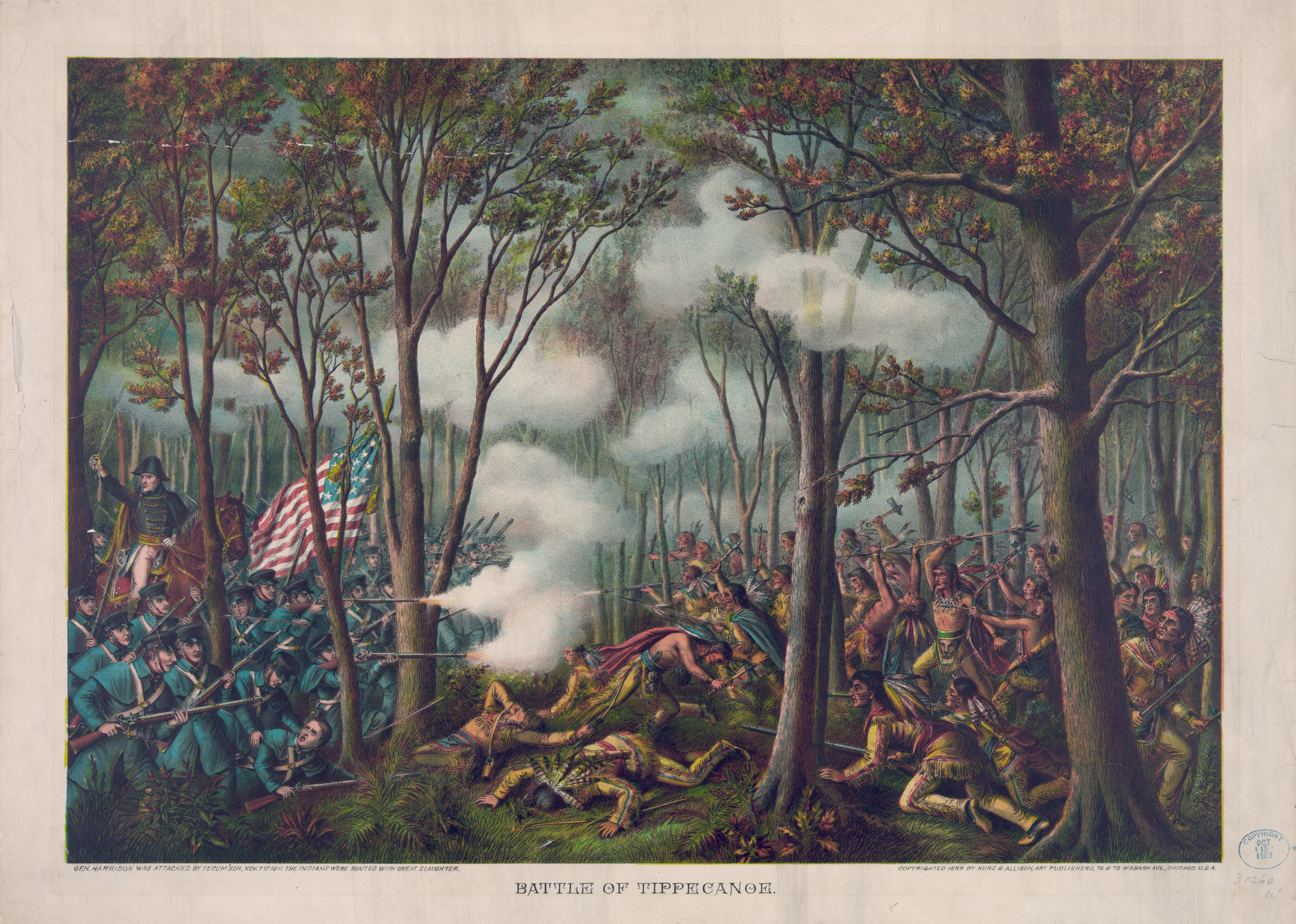
The Battle of Tippecanoe was a turning point for the Indigenous peoples of the Kankakee Marsh region, breaking the power of Tecumseh's confederacy, and leading to the loss of Indigenous lands to the U.S. government.

Following the American Revolutionary War, Congress established the Northwest Territory in 1787 during the Northwest Indian War. The federal government systematically acquired Indigenous lands across the Midwest through a series of forced treaties and violence.

During the 1811 Battle of Tippecanoe, the Kankakee Marsh sheltered Indigenous women, children, the sick, and the elderly. The War of 1812 proved a turning point, with the Indigenous peoples defending key sites along the Kankakee and Yellow rivers. Following the decline of British influence post-1812, the Pottawatomi moved toward peace with the U.S. government. By the 1820s, however, encroaching American settlements increasingly undermined the traditional hunting and trapping economies of Indigenous peoples.

Indian removals in Indiana began in the 1790s through government treaties. The Kankakee Marsh was acquired via five specific treaties. The first was the 1821 Treaty of Chicago (Cession 117), which forced the Ottawa, Chippewa, and Potawatomi to cede headwaters near South Bend and the St. Joseph River. The second was the 1826 Treaty of Mississinewa (Cession 133), in which the Potawatomi ceded the remaining marsh's headwaters.

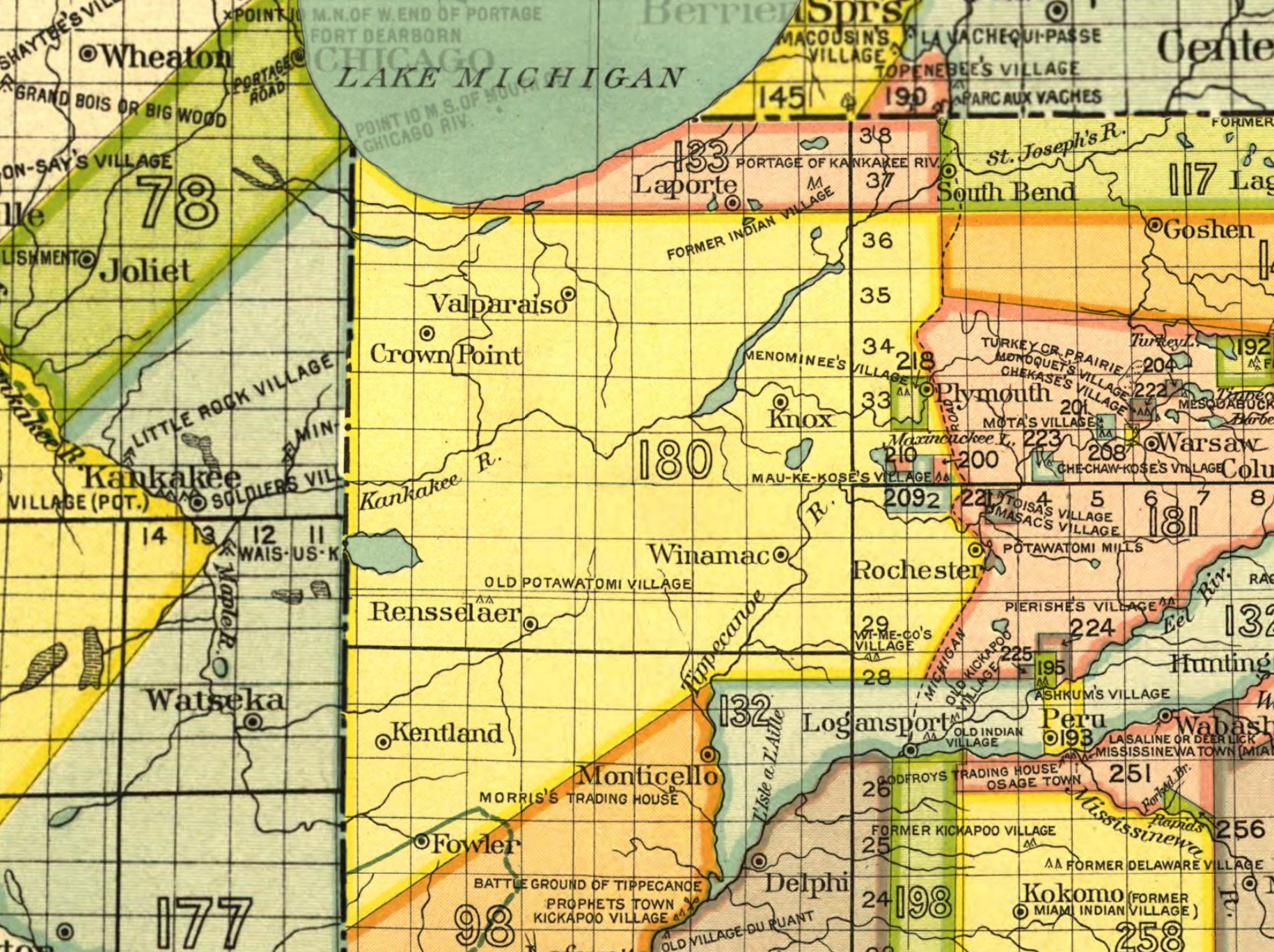
Indigenous peoples lost the majority of the Grand Kankakee Marsh in the 1832 Treaty of Tippecanoe (Cession 180). Other land cessions on this map are visible by their number.

Following the 1830 Indian Removal Act, further treaty negotiations led to additional forced relocations of the Potawatomi in northeastern Illinois. This resulted in the third treaty for the region: the October 20, 1832 Treaty with the Potawatomi, Prairie, and Kankakee Band (Cession 177), which ceded the Kankakee Marsh in Illinois. The fourth treaty, the October 26, 1832 Treaty of Tippecanoe (Cession 180), ceded the entire Kankakee Marsh region across northern Indiana. The removal of the Potawatomi from the Kankakee region between 1833 and 1834 severely crippled the regional fur trade.

The Potawatomi remained within the Yellow River headwaters until April 1836, when treaties ceded the Lake Maxinkuckee lands. The final treaty for the Kankakee Marsh region (Cession 218, signed on August 5, 1836) ceded the Yellow River's headwaters and the site of modern-day Plymouth. Additional treaties followed in September 1836 covering the neighboring Tippecanoe River headwaters.

Before the term Manifest destiny was first used in 1845, the Indian Removal Act of 1830 enabled White settlers to violently remove Indigenous peoples from their lands. Through settler colonialism (including genocide and ethnic cleansing), settlers and the American government acquired land and resources in Illinois and Indiana, including midwestern wetlands like the Kankakee Marsh. Indigenous peoples of the Kankakee region and northwest Indiana were further harmed through government policies of assimilation and civilizing missions, such as Isaac McCoy's mission schools in northwest Indiana.

Indigenous people were vulnerable to "land sharks", speculators anxious to purchase Indigenous territories including "floats", which were small pieces of land granted to the tribe through the treaties. These speculators would buy up these floats, then sell them to settlers at higher prices throughout the Kankakee region.

Small groups of Indigenous people remained in the Kankakee Marsh by 1835. In the winter of 1837–1838, some 350 Indigenous people sheltered on islands in the Kankakee Marsh. The 1838 Potawatomi Trail of Death occurred when American militia forced remaining Potawatomi bands out of Indiana at gunpoint, marching them to Missouri and resulting in high mortality rates. Some Potawatomi escaped the Trail of Death back to the Kankakee Marsh region, seeking refuge there before moving on to Michigan where the U.S. Army would pursue and capture them in 1840. Other bands were forced out as late as 1850.

Historians describe rare encounters with Indigenous people in the Kankakee region years after the removals.

=== Early settlements in the marsh ===
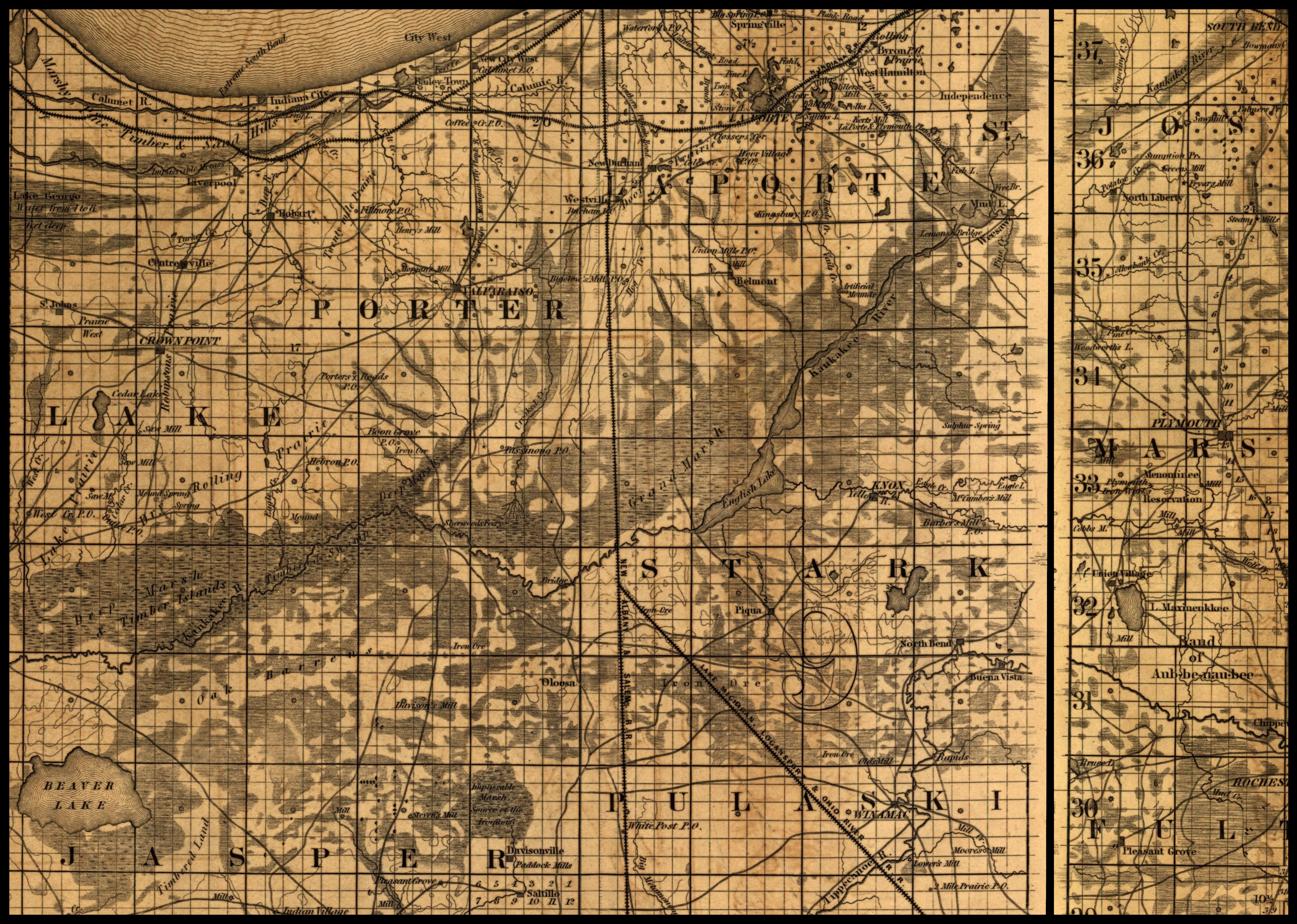
An 1852 map of the Kankakee Marsh. Known by settlers as the "Water Valley" or "The Blue Sea", it was defined by its overflowing river meanders and flooded prairies, which unified into a single, vast wetland.

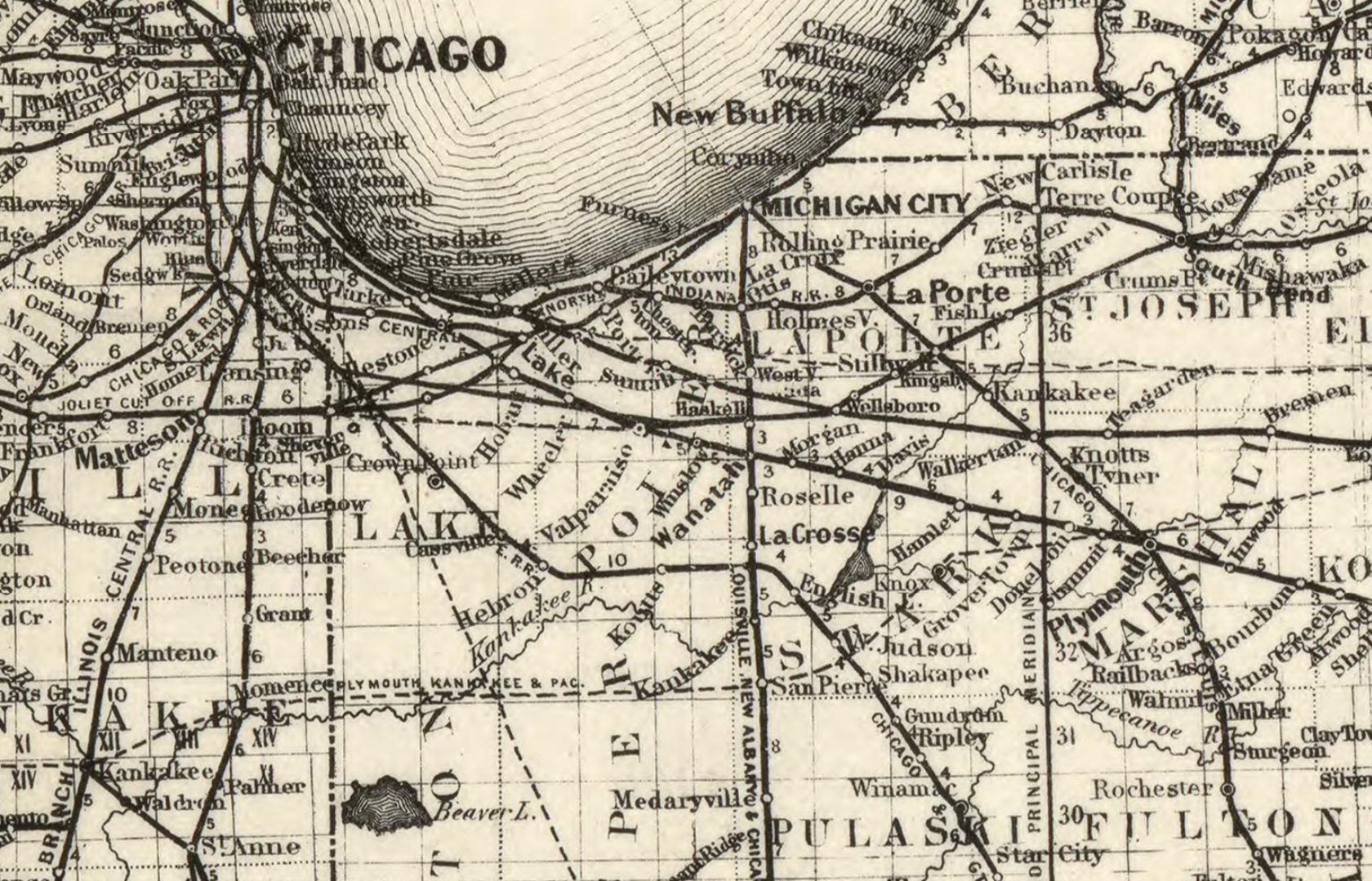
Indiana had 4,963 miles (7,987 km) of rail by 1880, facilitating the transport of agricultural goods to larger markets. Rails connected Rensselaer and Chicago by bridging the Kankakee River, allowing greater access to the marsh for development.

The Kankakee Marsh was the last area of settlement east of the Mississippi. Settlers regarded it as "remarkable" and a real-life "Garden of Eden." One historian did not favor the region, comparing the Kankakee River to the River Styx and the Kankakee Marsh to Acheron.

The Indiana legislature authorized the construction of roads leading from Indianapolis in 1821. However, the Kankakee Marsh's terrain delayed development of the region. It blocked emigration from southern Indiana, obligating settlers to move around it through LaPorte and St. Joseph counties, or to move east to places like Allen County. During winter, people could cross its frozen rivers. Prospective settlers were also discouraged from settling in the marsh by the economic depression of the 1830s.

Historians described marsh settlers as "a class of people out of the ordinary," and "afraid of no one." Myths about the marsh were fueled by tales of criminals hiding in swamps or on islands, fossil discoveries during drainage, and dangerous muck. Bogus Island in Beaver Lake gained notoriety as a base for bandits, counterfeiters, and horse thieves between 1837 and 1858. Jasper County similarly earned a reputation for crime, as its swamps provided refuge for the "Bandits on the Prairie". In 1858, the county organized "The Jasper Rangers" to apprehend these outlaws and enforce the law.

The Land Act of 1820, pricing land at $1.25 per acre, accelerated settlements in the Kankakee region. Before 1832, the population consisted primarily of fur traders and trappers. The Michigan Road facilitated migration to the Kankakee region. Despite the challenging wetland terrain, land surveys by the General Land Office (GLO) were completed around 1830, with "claim seekers" arriving in Lake County by 1834, well before official sales commenced in 1839.

In the 1840s, settlers utilized the marsh for livestock, aided by wolf bounties, and established homes on sand ridges using "ditch fences" for drainage and property marking. They cultivated cranberry and fertilized land with muck. They harvested timber from marsh islands and used mineral springs medicinally. Industrial growth progressed from bog iron and marl lime production in the 1830s. Sawmills and grain mills were established in 1836. Railroads expanded into the marsh in the 1860s, allowing settlers to develop wetlands and prairies adjacent to the tracks.

Early settlers arrived from southern Indiana and Ohio, followed by European immigrants from Germany, Italy, Poland, Sweden, and Bohemia. The population further grew with immigrants from Britain, Russia, and the Netherlands. Baptists, Presbyterians, Catholics, and Methodists established churches between the 1830s and 1870s.

=== The Underground Railroad and the Grand Kankakee Marsh ===
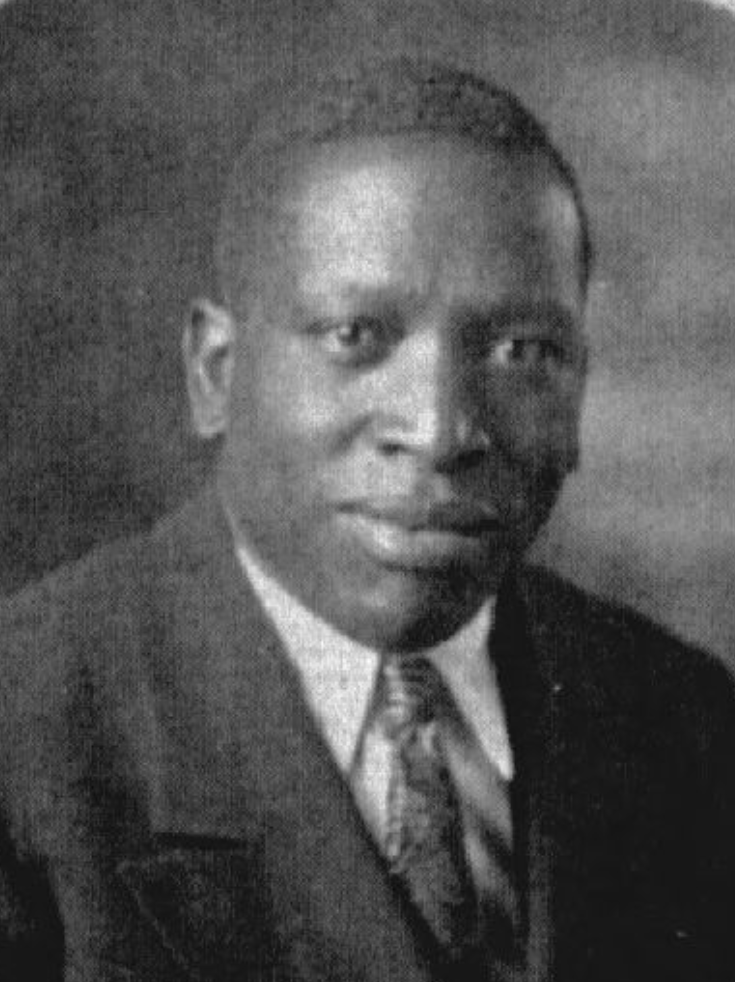
Historian W. Sherman Savage documented an Underground Railroad stop in North Judson, situated within the marsh, just south of English Lake.

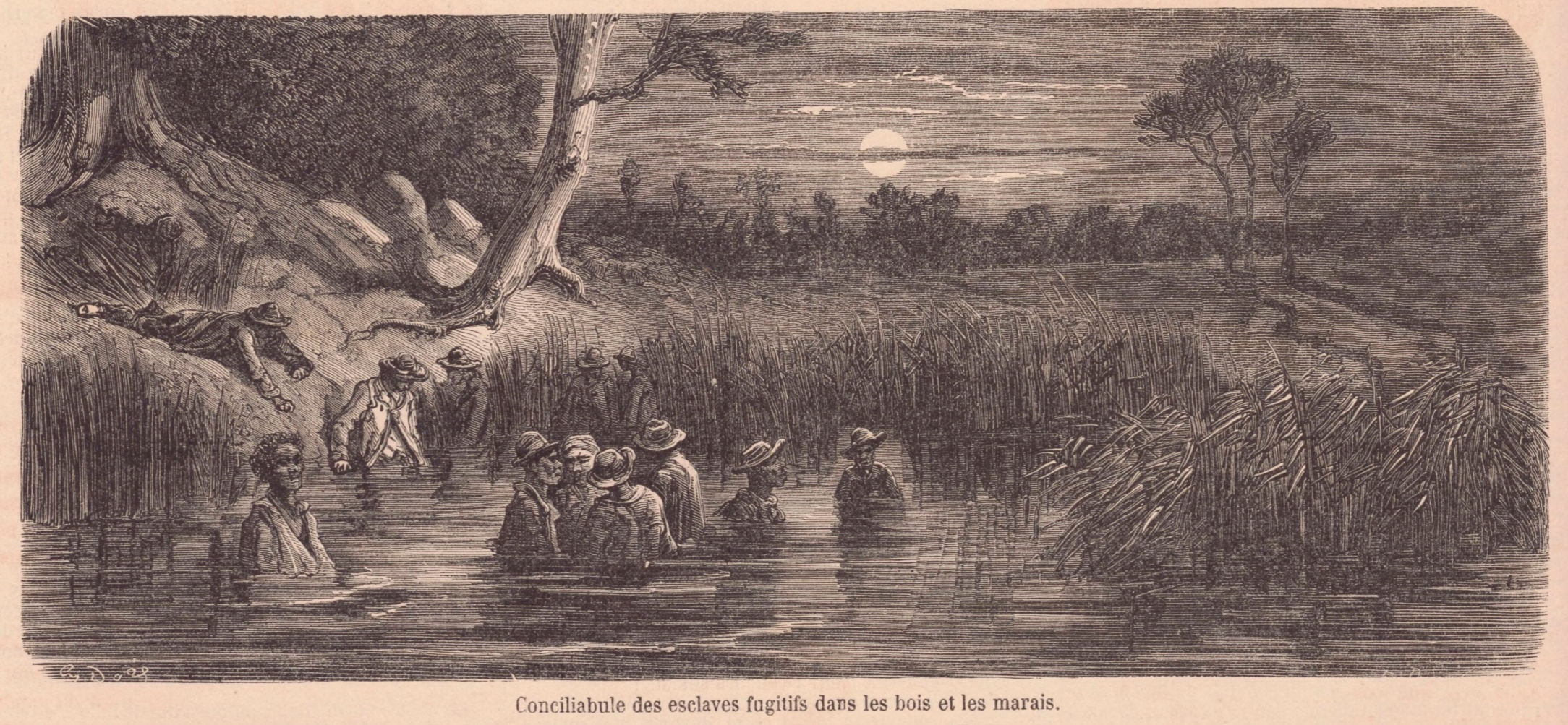
1861 illustration from Le Monde Illustré of freedom seekers in a marsh. Such period prints depict how freedom seekers used dense wetland terrain for concealment where no local photographs exist. Self-emancipated people used their prior experience navigating southern wetlands when traversing the Kankakee Marsh.

Although Indiana was not a slave state, 19th-century Black settlers faced systemic discrimination, including mandatory registration, proof of freedom, and $500 good-behavior bonds. Such was the case of William Greenwood's 1834 citizenship in Kankakee Township. Several successful Black farming communities emerged within the marsh region. Henderson Settlement near Fish Lake in Lincoln Township produced high yields from cattle and corn. The Banks Settlement in Center Township also thrived. In St. Joseph County, the Huggart Settlement was established in the 1830s near what is now Potato Creek State Park.

The Underground Railroad in Indiana operated near the Grand Kankakee Marsh, leveraging the difficult terrain to assist freedom seekers traveling toward Canada. Historians including Wilbur H. Siebert studied Underground Railroad sites across the Kankakee region. Documented stops reached by crossing the marsh were Rensselaer (Jasper County) and Hurlburt (Porter County). To avoid detection, the clandestine locations for the Railroad frequently shifted.

Slaves used every precaution to evade recapture by slave catchers, including hiding in wetlands. Before runaway slaves reached the Kankakee Marsh to hide, they had already accumulated experience hiding in other wetlands. They included Deming's Dismal Swamp, Attica's swamps, and Marion County's swamps and marshes where abolitionist Quakers led slaves to freedom.

Although most of Indiana's White population opposed the Underground Railroad, its operators included White people, particularly Quakers such as Levi Coffin. White people worked with Black people to free slaves for religious reasons, and also for resisting the encroachments of slave hunters on their lands.

In 1849, hundreds of armed men from Michigan liberated a group of recaptured slaves in South Bend near the Kankakee Marsh's headwaters.

The Black community of Hopkins Park (Kankakee County, IL) sheltered fugitive slaves seeking freedom in Canada. Pembroke Township (Kankakee County, IL) later established a large black population. Indiana operators and agents in the Underground Railroad helped slaves at the risk of being punished by the state. The Fugitive Slave Act of 1850 further imposed strict penalties.

Unconfirmed accounts of Underground Railroad stops and hiding places within the Kankakee Marsh include slaves hiding on Bogus Island in Beaver Lake. A small Black farming community later developed in McClellan Township within the drained Beaver Lake by 1870. Lost Lake reportedly concealed slaves within the Kankakee Marsh.

=== Early drainage efforts ===
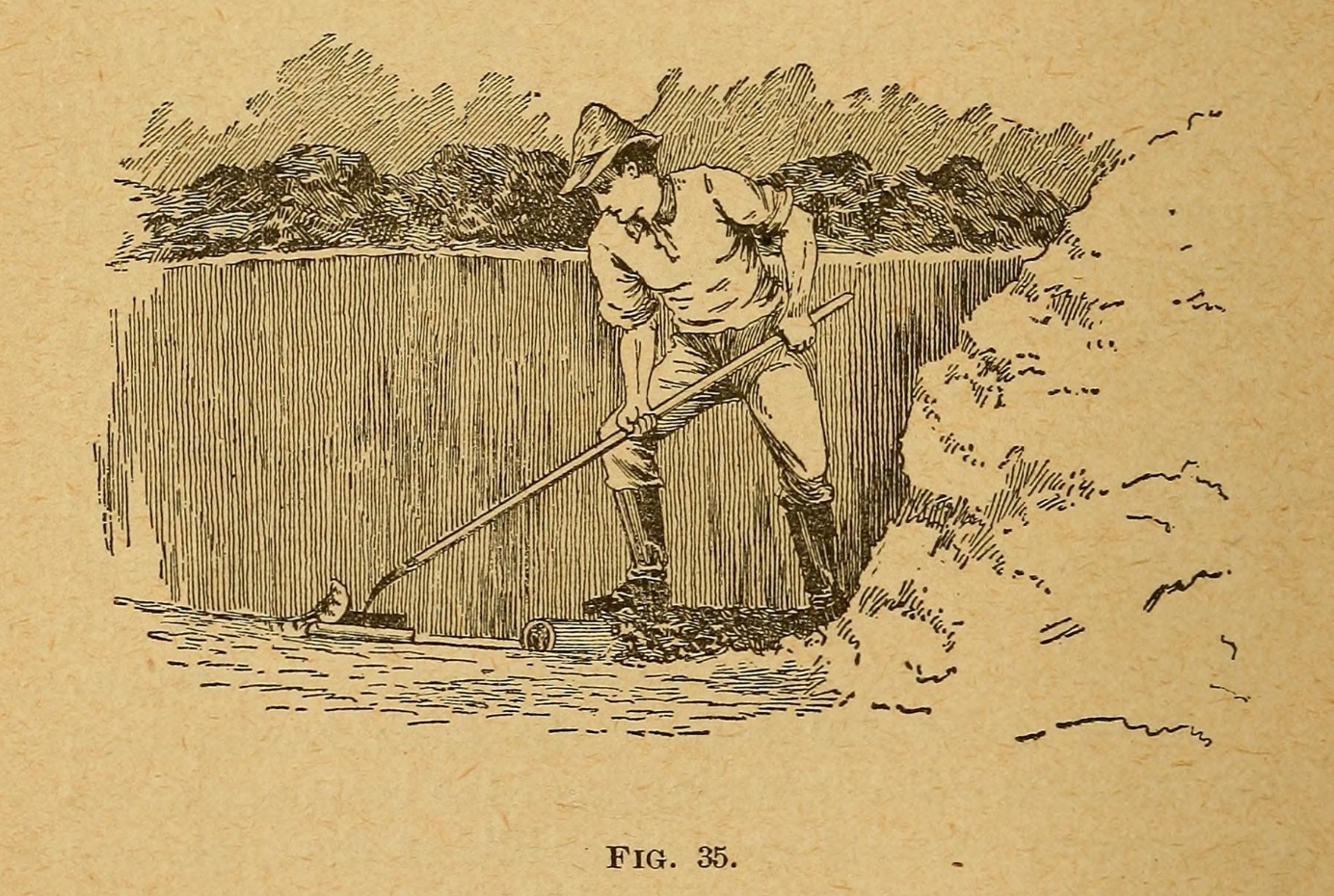
Tiles, seen in this image beneath the person's foot, were laid 3 to 4 feet deep to lower the water table and drain excess water into man-made ditches, allowing farmers to grow crops.

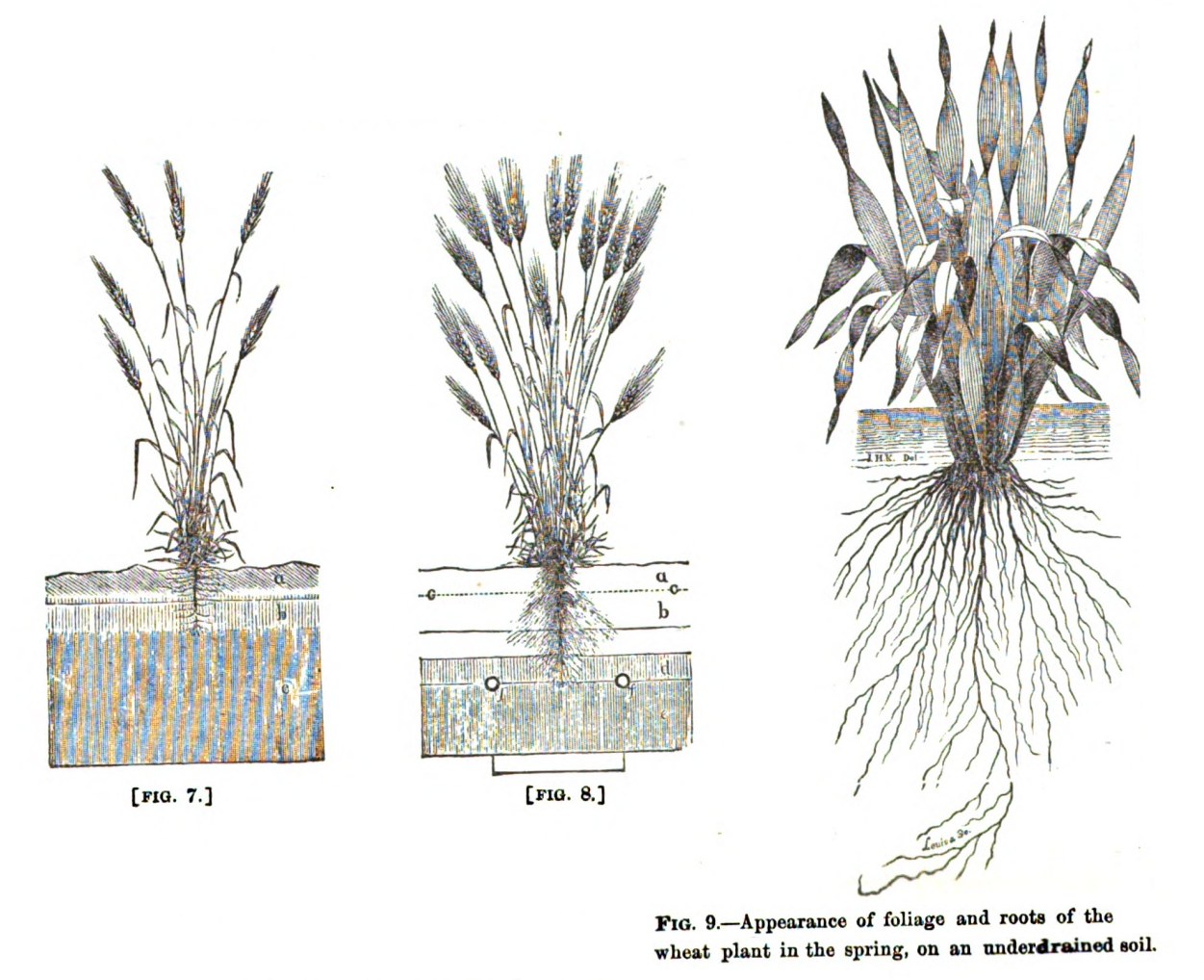
How wheat grows in undrained (Fig. 7) and drained soils (Fig. 9). Tile drains and ditches lower a wetland's water table (Fig. 8). Crop roots cannot grow in waterlogged, clay soils.

Farmers struggled to drain the Kankakee Marsh due to inadequate technology and the absence of organized drainage laws. The federal government passed the Swamp Land Act of 1850, donating wetlands to states for development and setting a sale price of $1.25 per acre. In May 1852, the Indiana State Legislature began regulating the sales of wetlands and providing grants for drainage and land reclamation.

Each county appointed a swamp land commissioner to oversee reclamation with engineers. Steam dredges excavated ditches typically 20 feet (6.1 m) wide and 5–8 feet (1.5–2.4 m) deep. In 1852, the Indiana State Board of Agriculture proposed state-funded drainage of the Kankakee Marsh by canalizing the river to increase property values and tax revenue.

In 1853, efforts began to drain Beaver Lake for farming, which Lemuel Milk later completed. Widespread fraud plagued government-funded ditch construction, as commissioners colluded with contractors to misappropriate funds, leaving much of the marsh undeveloped. An 1859 Legislative Committee confirmed significant theft, including over $40,000 in state-level losses and more than $100,000 in Lake County alone, where less than half the allocated money actually funded drainage. The state failed to recover the assets.

In 1869, Indiana enacted the Kankakee Drainage Law to facilitate wetland reclamation. The Kankakee Valley Draining Company formed that same year but dissolved after legal challenges from landowners protesting its power to levy assessments. In 1871, the state issued millions in bonds to fund further drainage. By 1877, investors from Chicago and Cincinnati financed the conversion of wetlands into corn fields and cattle pastures. Geologists framed the marsh as a "vast waste" inhabited only by wildlife, and that professionally engineered drainage could transform it into an agricultural "garden spot."

=== "The march of evil": Public health issues in the marsh ===
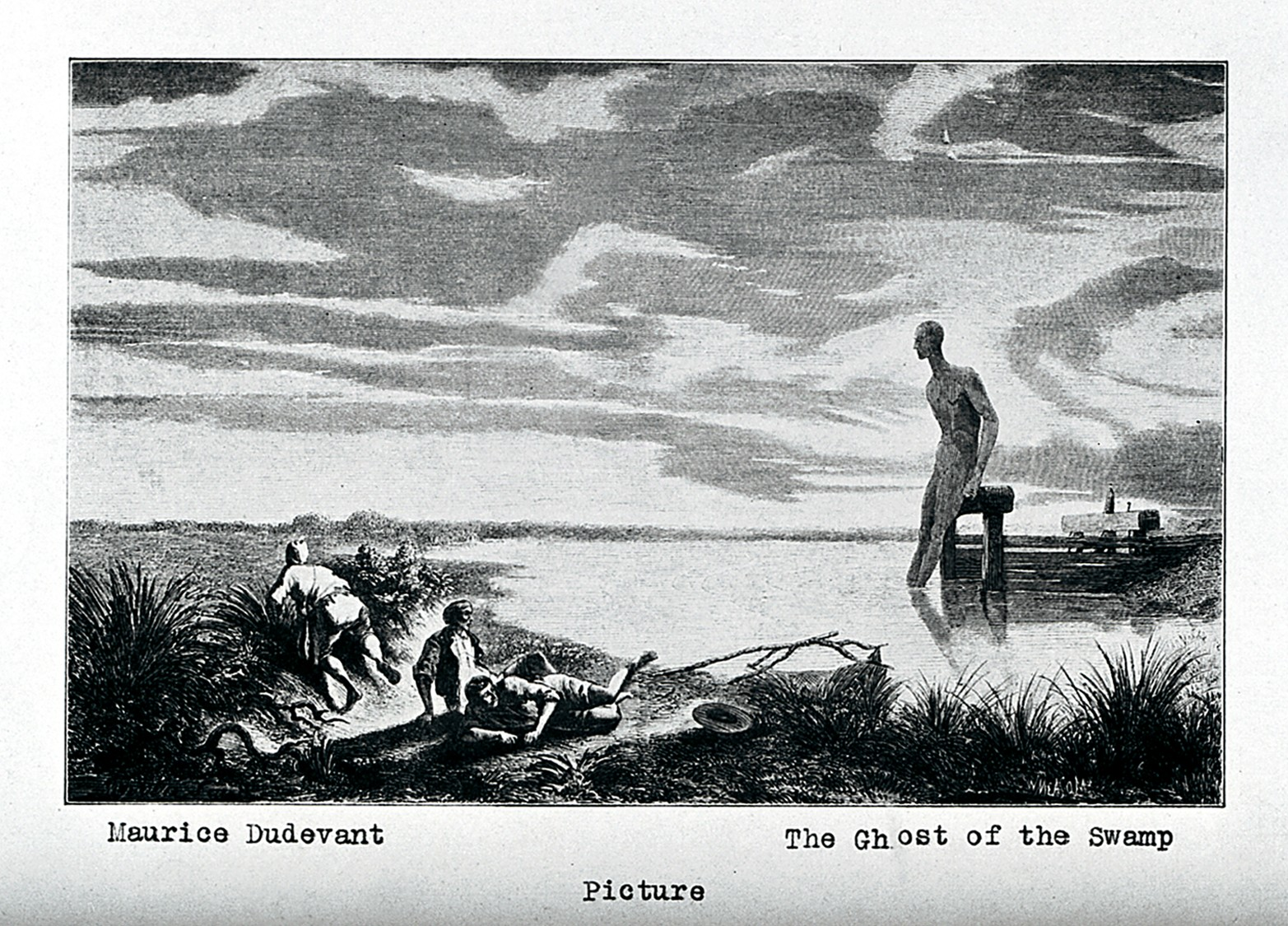
The Ghost of the Swamp by Maurice Sand (or Maurice Dudevant), 1850, is an allegory for malaria. Its mortality and infection rates in the Kankakee Marsh are unknown, often due to misdiagnosis of the disease. Mid-19th-century medical records were unreliable, with the 1870 U.S. census noting "gross incompleteness" in mortality reports.

The Kankakee Marsh was impacted by misunderstandings about wetlands used to promote agricultural interests. In the 1860s, the agricultural community even considered wetlands "evil". Robert Clark Kedzie, author of Shadows from the Walls of Death and a physician in support of drainage, described the "water-soaked soils" of wetlands as "The march of evil".

Indigenous populations suffered significant losses not from the marsh they had lived with for over 13,000 years, but from disease endemics newly introduced by European and American settlers. Diseases like smallpox decimated Indigenous communities, killing an estimated 90% of all Indigenous peoples across the Western Hemisphere. European germ warfare also caused Indigenous population declines.

Public fear of diseases like malaria drove wetland destruction. Scientist John Merle Coulter embraced miasma theory in 1881, arguing that wetlands would "poison the air" unless they were drained for farming. Epidemics such as cholera are primarily driven by inadequate human hygiene and sanitation. However, many Indiana physicians falsely asserted that draining the Kankakee Marsh would improve public health "a hundred-fold," prioritizing land reclamation over genuine sanitary reform.

=== "A hunters' and trappers' paradise": recreational hunting and fishing in the marsh ===
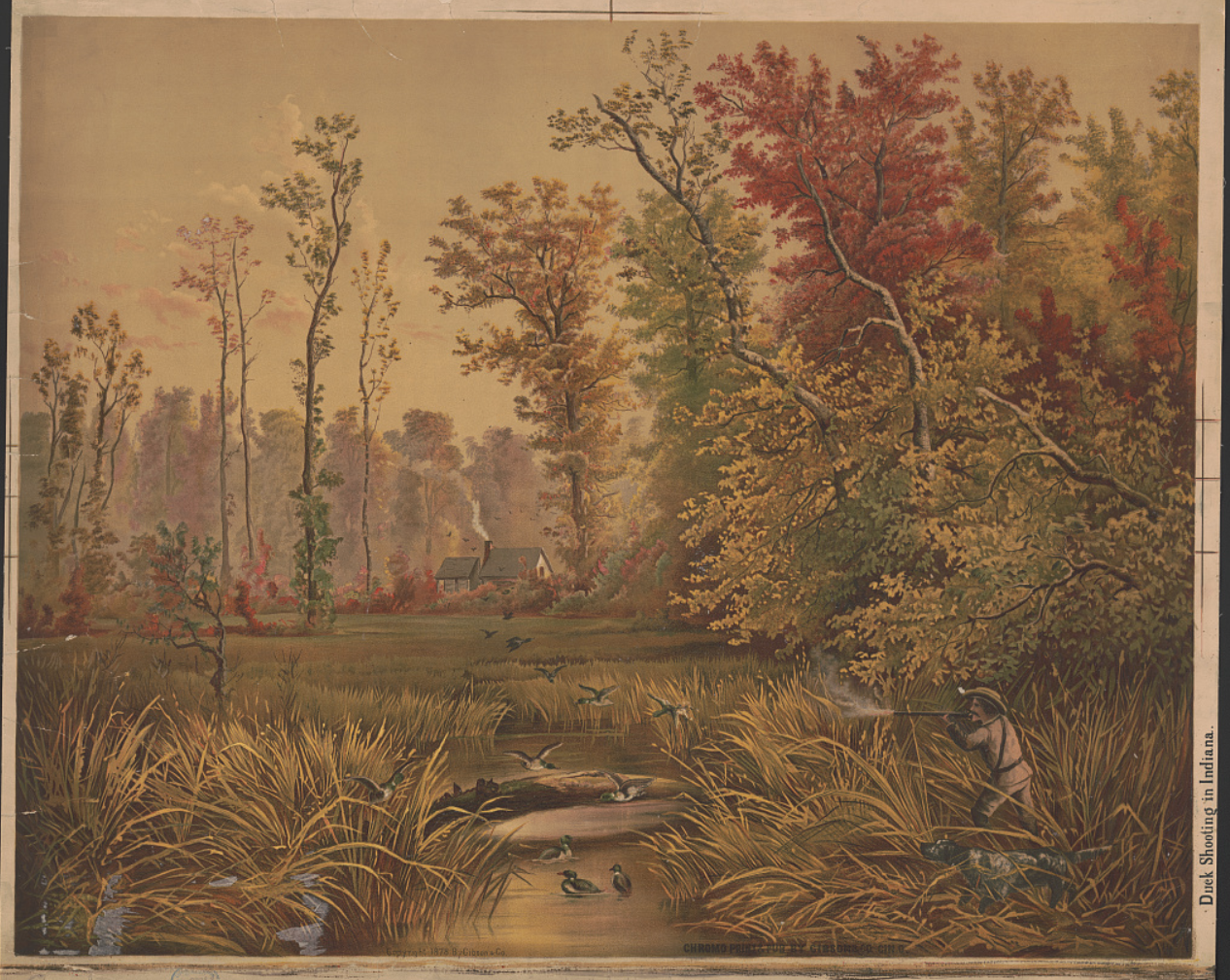
Known as a "hunter's paradise," the Kankakee Marsh supported abundant game. Hunters frequently reported extreme bird density. One witness stated, "birds were so plentiful that at times I have seen as much as ten or twenty acres of ground covered so thickly that it would appear there was no room for any more."

By the mid- to late-19th century, the Kankakee Marsh gained international renown as a premier hunting destination, drawing enthusiasts from across the U.S. and Europe. Often described as a "hunters' and trappers' paradise," the region hosted vast populations of migratory waterfowl, including ducks, geese, snipe, and plover.

Kankakee Marsh gun clubs included the Chicago-based English Lake Gun Club and Starke County's Maksawba Club, where members hunted diverse game like duck, snipe, rail, woodcock, quail, grouse, and rabbit, and fished for pike and bass. The Diana Club and Cumberland Club hosted organized medal contests for live-bird shooting.

Gun clubs held charter memberships focused on socializing and marksmanship, with daily individual tallies reaching 300 birds daily per person. Hunters could claim up to 80 deer in a single day; some used muzzleloaders.

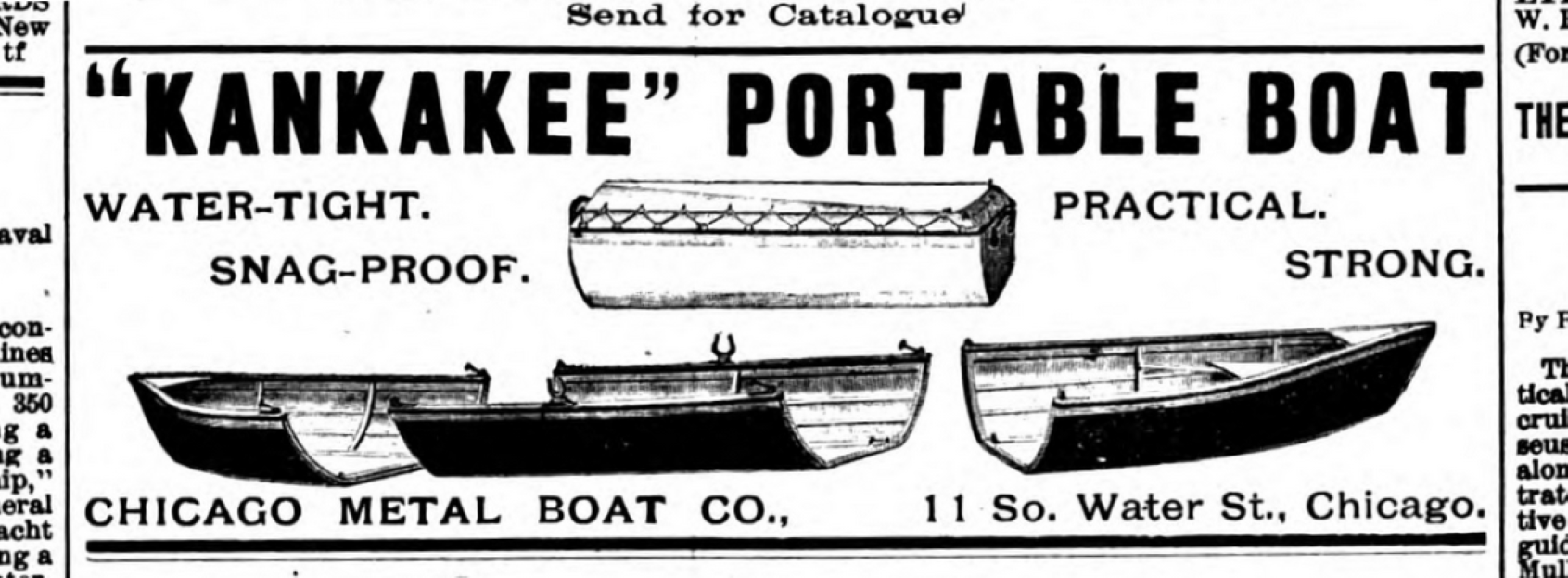
Chicago-based businesses profited by selling hunting and fishing goods, clothing, rods, guns, and the Kankakee portable boat.

The introduction of the breechloader increased hunting efficiency, facilitating the rapid slaughter of wildlife. Shooting accidents became common, and the Kankakee's dense forested swamps gained a reputation for danger, with reports of men and hunting dogs disappearing. Two hunters drowned in the river's treacherous meander known as the "Devil's Elbow."

Trains transported Chicago-based hunters directly to the Kankakee Marsh and its private clubs. Out-of-state hunters paid a $25 license fee for access. While the Toleston Club, near the Illinois border, implemented a 25-bird daily limit, hunting remained intense. Many constructed seasonal shelters, while others utilized local hotels or commuted via the Indiana, Illinois and Iowa Railroad, often staying at locations like the Hotel Riverview in Kankakee. Famous people hunted and fished in the marsh, including Lew Wallace, author of Ben-Hur.

The Kankakee River attracted sportsmen targeting muskellunge, bass, crappies, perch, pickerel, and catfish. The introduction of European carp disrupted this ecosystem; their tendency to overrun rivers and muddy clear streams led anglers to label them a nuisance that "ruined" the river. Carp were dynamited in large numbers with brutal efficiency.

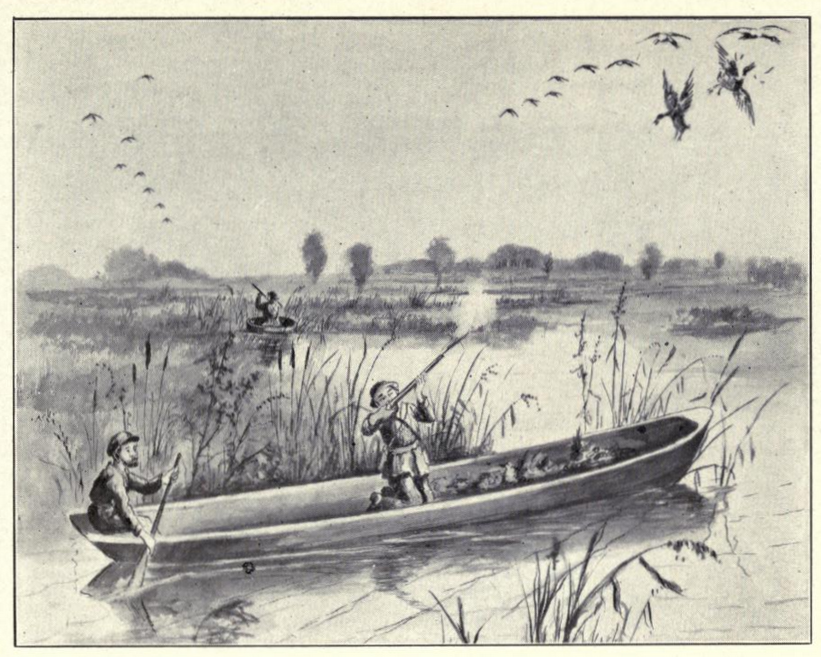
Intense hunting pressure drove waterfowl from historic feeding grounds. Witnesses described skies darkened by ducks targeted for slaughter. One hunter lamented, "It was cruel shooting. Cruel because it was wasteful."

Unregulated hunting and fishing devastated the marsh's wildlife; local restaurants routinely served illegal game. Porcupine, otter and coyote populations were locally exterminated. Commercial demand for game included pigeon, frog, and turtle. Bullfrogs were exported to other states for market. In 1883, an entrepreneur in North Judson commercially exported 35 tons of frogs and hundreds of turtles to markets and universities.

Expanded railroad networks facilitated this exploitation, enabling the rapid shipment of game and timber. By 1889, Railroad Township joined a statewide oil supply network. Railroads supplied resources for Chicago.

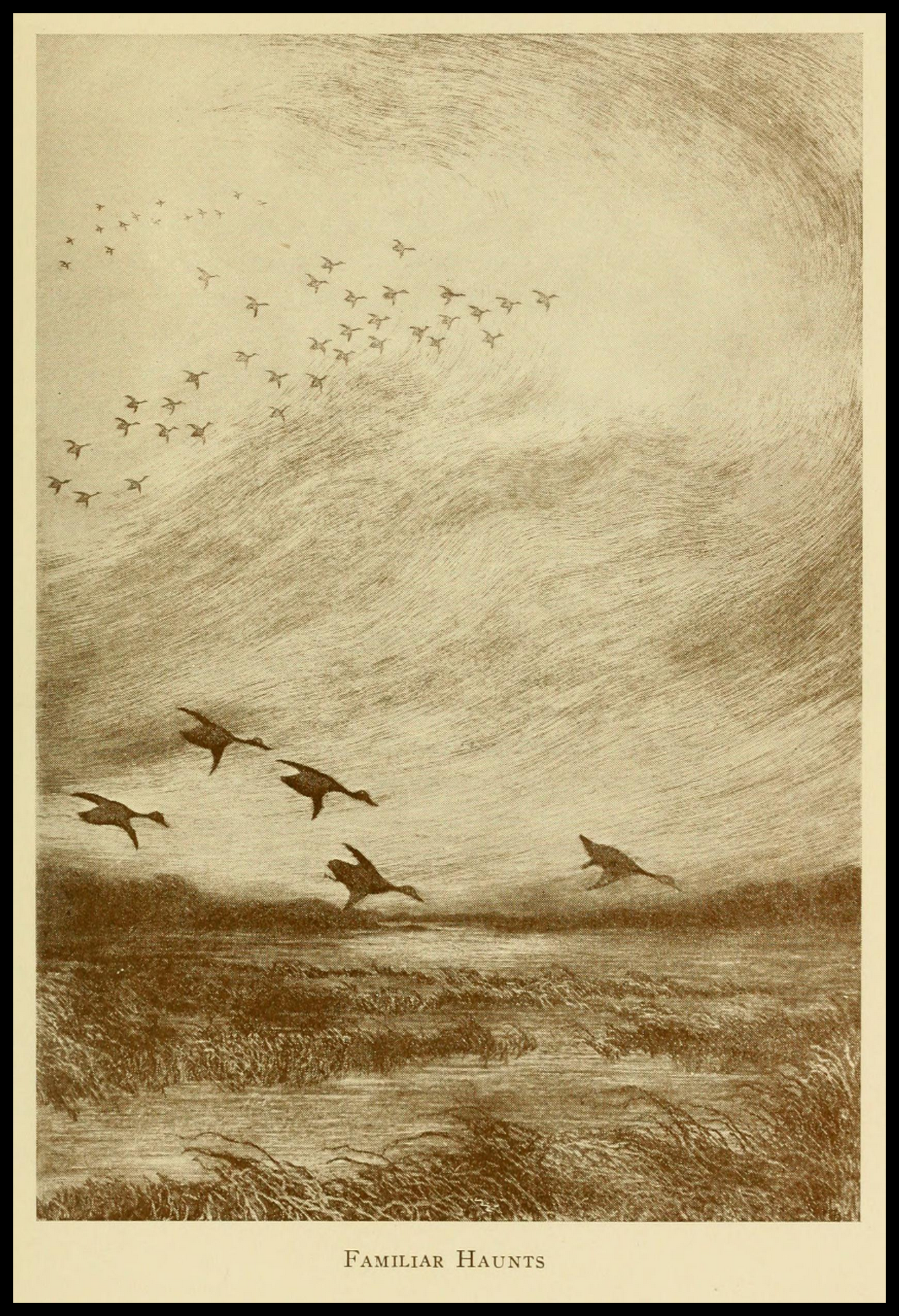
1867 wildlife management focused on game size restrictions. Following 1890 hunting regulations, duck populations rebounded; one flock reportedly spanned over a mile.

Telegraphs provided hunters real-time intelligence from English Lake and local bayous, optimizing the tracking and hunting of prize birds. Chicago mills profited from egret plumes sourced in the Kankakee. Despite market value for crane plumes in women's hats, hunters slaughtered 60 to 80 Great Blue Herons daily at "Crane Heaven" near English Lake, often discarding the carcasses where they fell on the ground.

In one day, 1,300 ducks were killed within a 200-square-yard area, prompting local media to report, "This is how the ducks are being destroyed." Forest and Stream editors documented daily tallies of 100 birds per hunter, warning: "If this will not exterminate game, for goodness sake what will?"

Commercial hunting for fur and pelts thrived in the Kankakee Marsh and at Beaver Lake. On Fuller Island near Shelby, single hunts yielded large wagons filled with thousands of dead rabbits, while the region's muskrat and long-tailed weasel populations faced intense annual trapping.

In March 1879, Indiana protected native fish populations, yet concurrently passed laws enabling wetland drainage without habitat safeguards. Despite proposals to repurpose wetlands for fish culture, large-scale drainage prioritized agricultural expansion.

Distrusting Indiana politicians to enforce anti-trespassing laws, hunting clubs and private landowners hired their own security. By the 1890s, residents lobbied for protected areas and wardens. The Kankakee Fish and Game Protection Association formed in 1891, using fines to curb lawlessness while supporting commercial interests.

Deer populations collapsed statewide except in the Kankakee Marsh. Impending river channelization would further accelerate wildlife extirpation. While Forest and Stream initially downplayed the threat of the draining of the marsh, economic pressure intensified; the Indiana State Board of Agriculture projected land values would jump from $4 to $30 per acre upon drainage.

== Draining the marsh ==
=== Channelization, 1882–1917 ===
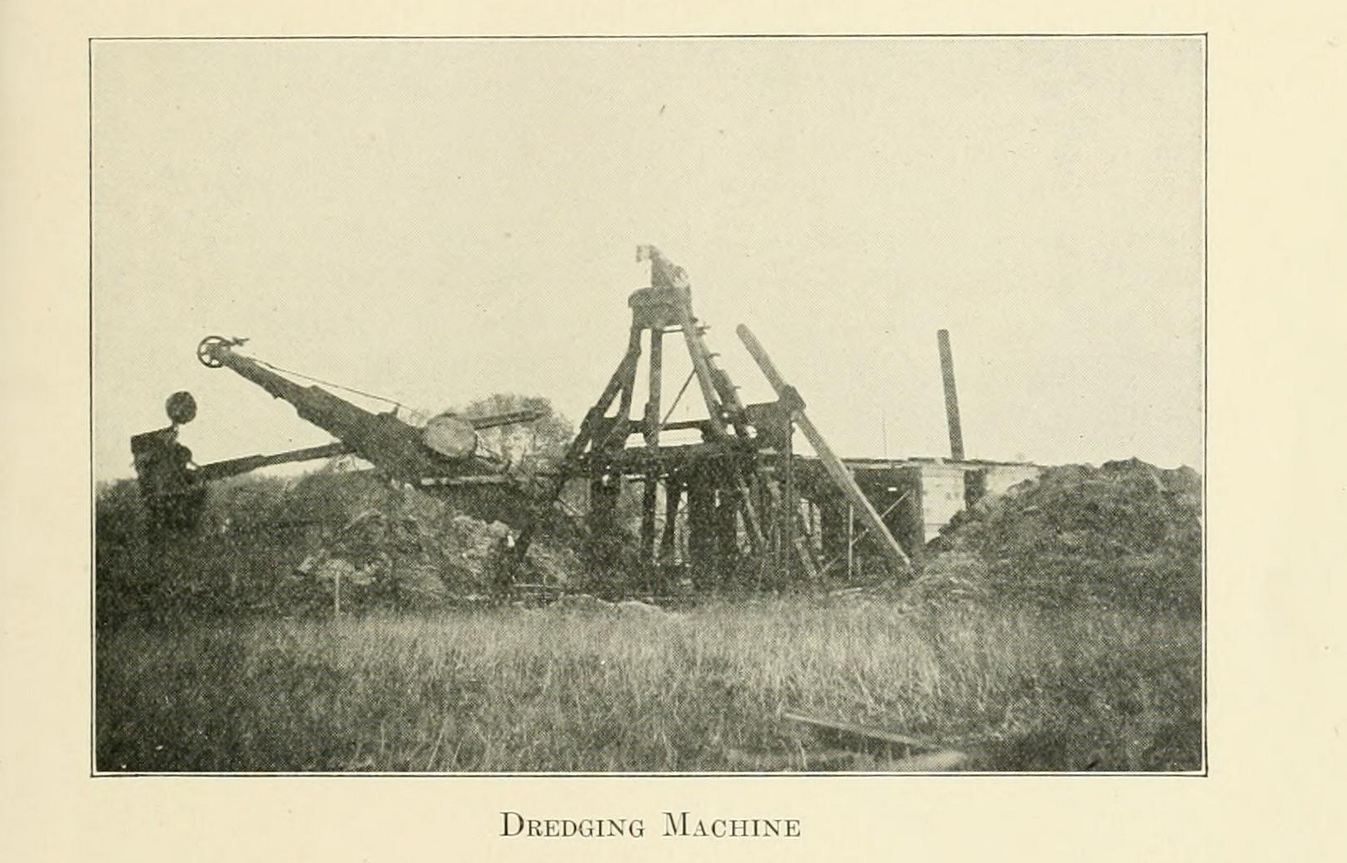
Each steam dredger floated in channels of their own making. They were operated by six-man crews, and each 40-horsepower unit maintained 60 pounds of boiler pressure to excavate 1,300 cubic yards (990 m^{3}) of earth daily from the Kankakee Marsh.

In 1882, Dr. John Campbell published a report formalizing strategies to drain the Kankakee Marsh. These plans built on concepts circulating since the 1850s, specifically the removal of a 3-mile (4.8 km) limestone ledge at Momence that constrained river flow. In 1883, the Kankakee Draining Company identified 624,805 acres (252,850 ha) for reclamation, projecting $8–10 million in agricultural profit.

The Kankakee Draining Company proposed a new river channel measuring 52 feet (16 m) wide at the top, 42 feet (13 m) wide at the bottom, about 10 feet (3.0 m) deep, and inclined at 1 foot per metre (300 m/km). This would increase the water's velocity to 3.32 feet per second (1.01 m/s) and its discharge volume to 1,558 cubic feet per second (44.1 m^{3}/s). In 1885, Campbell testified that this project would truncate the river from 240 miles (390 km) to 80 miles (130 km), but indicated ongoing maintenance was essential, noting, "a straight channel tends continually to become crooked."

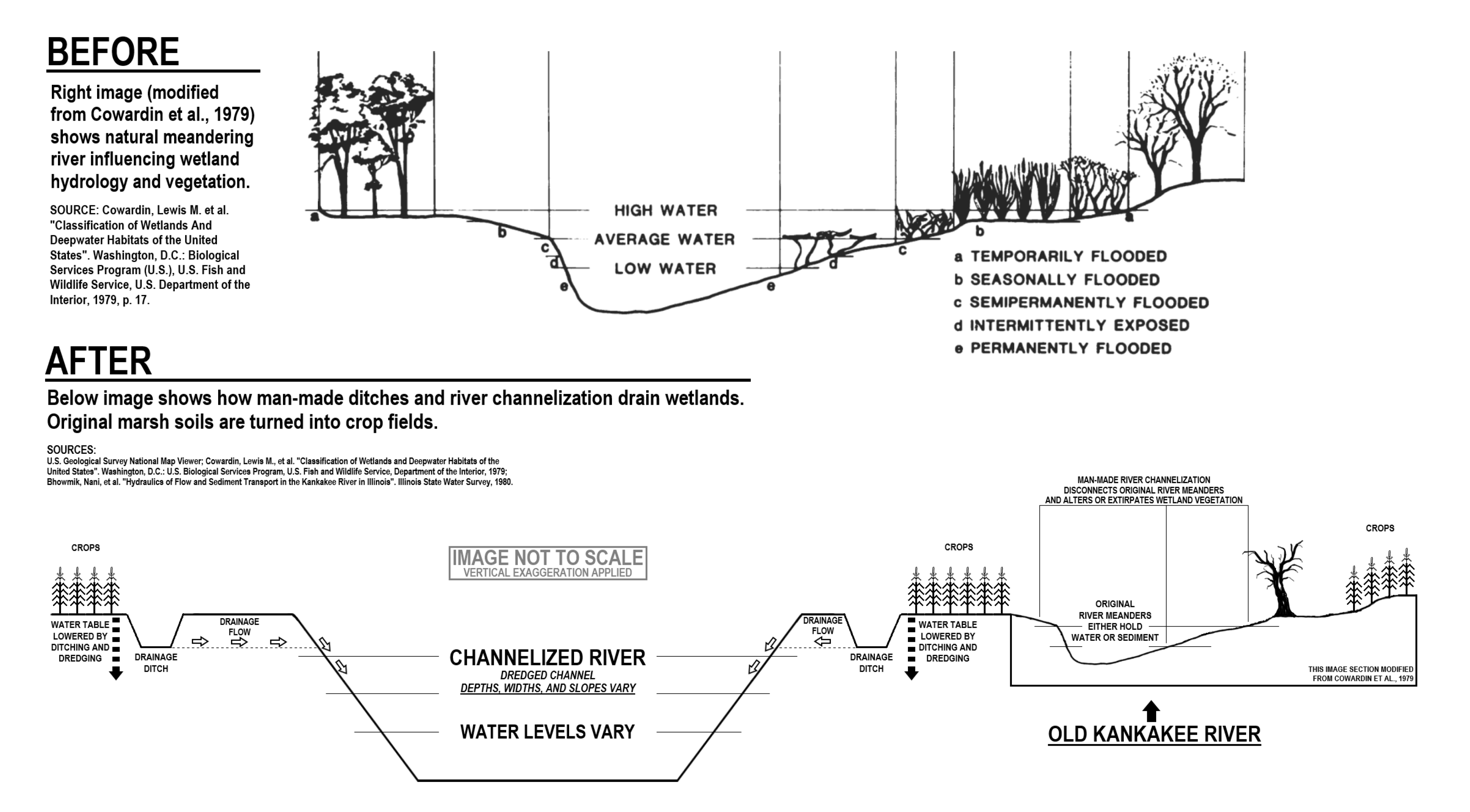
Kankakee Marsh ditches ranged from 2–6 feet (0.61–1.83 m) wide to 50–70 feet (15–21 m) wide. Water depths were 9–10 feet (2.7–3.0 m) in the larger ditches. Dredging accelerated drainage by increasing the Kankakee River's gradient to 2–5 feet per mile (0.38–0.95 m/km).

In the 1880s, the Illinois and Indiana Legislatures empowered drainage districts to levy taxes for reclamation. Under this system, landowners petitioned for state surveys and bond issues to fund construction. Although modest ditching began in the 1850s, the Kankakee Marsh west of Marshall County remained largely intact due to the lack of a sufficient outlet. To overcome this, a massive, systematic channelization project launched in 1884, utilizing steam-powered dredgers to restructure the landscape.

In 1886, the Indiana State Board of Agriculture adopted Campbell's report, prompting congressional efforts to secure federal funding for drainage at Momence. By 1887, two steam dredges began excavating, initiating the systematic drainage of the marsh. Business interests lobbied the Indiana General Assembly for state-funded, large-scale drainage by canalizing the Momence rock ledge. Drainage investors advanced steam dredging technology.

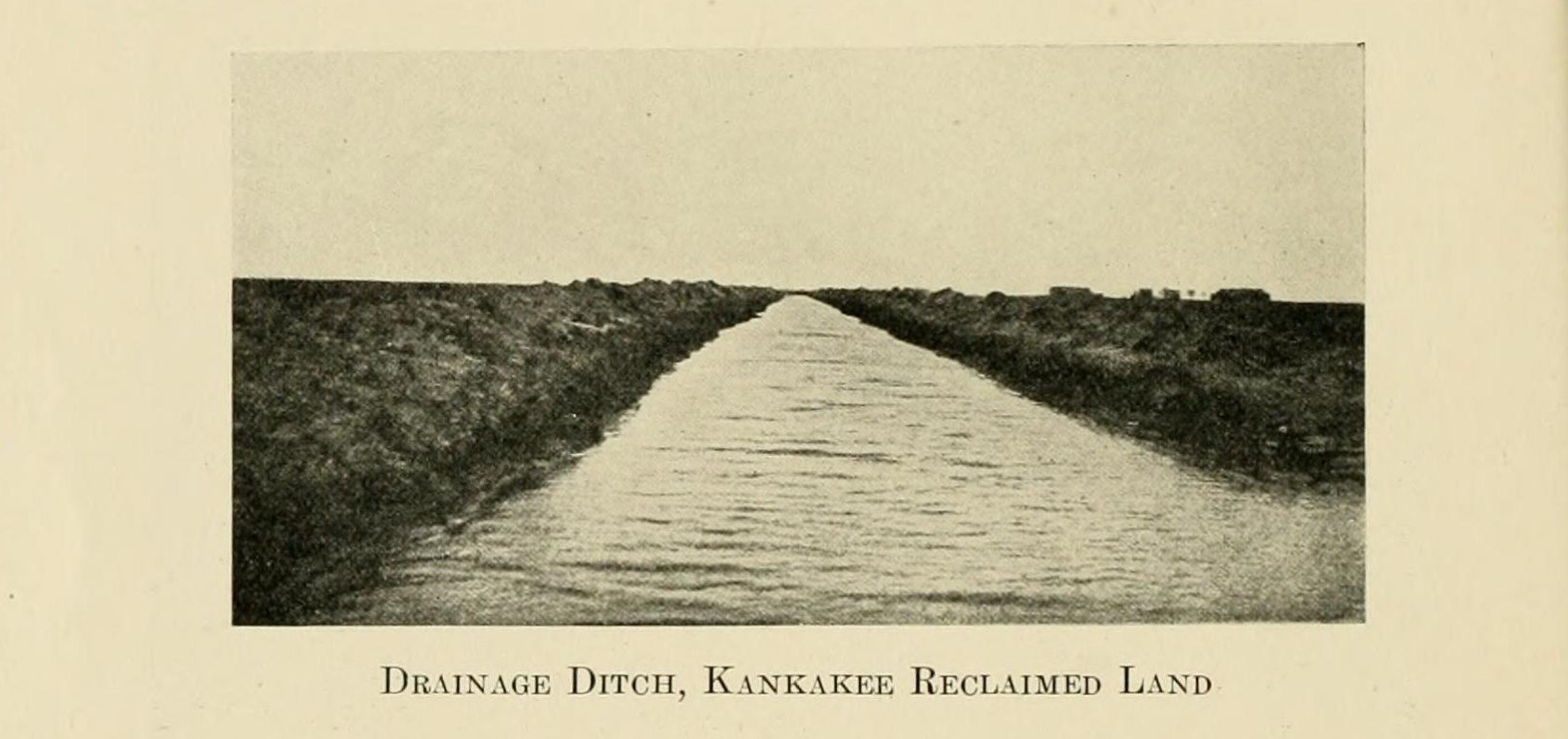
Steam dredgers channelized smaller streams and built larger ditches to control water coming from higher ground. Engineers acknowledged ditches and channels would increase the carrying capacity of existing rivers and cause flooding.

On March 7, 1889, the Indiana General Assembly appropriated $65,000 to remove the limestone ledge, with follow-up funding in 1891 and 1893. Paralleling Illinois's 1879 Drainage Levee and Farm Drainage Acts, Indiana passed legislation in 1889 enabling the formation of drainage districts to pool resources for further marsh destruction.

Historians and the public often mischaracterize the Momence Township, Illinois rock ledge as a removable dam responsible for impounding the Grand Kankakee Marsh. In reality, it is a 4-mile (6.4 km) stretch of exposed natural bedrock over which the river flows. Before its alteration, this reach was prized for fishing.

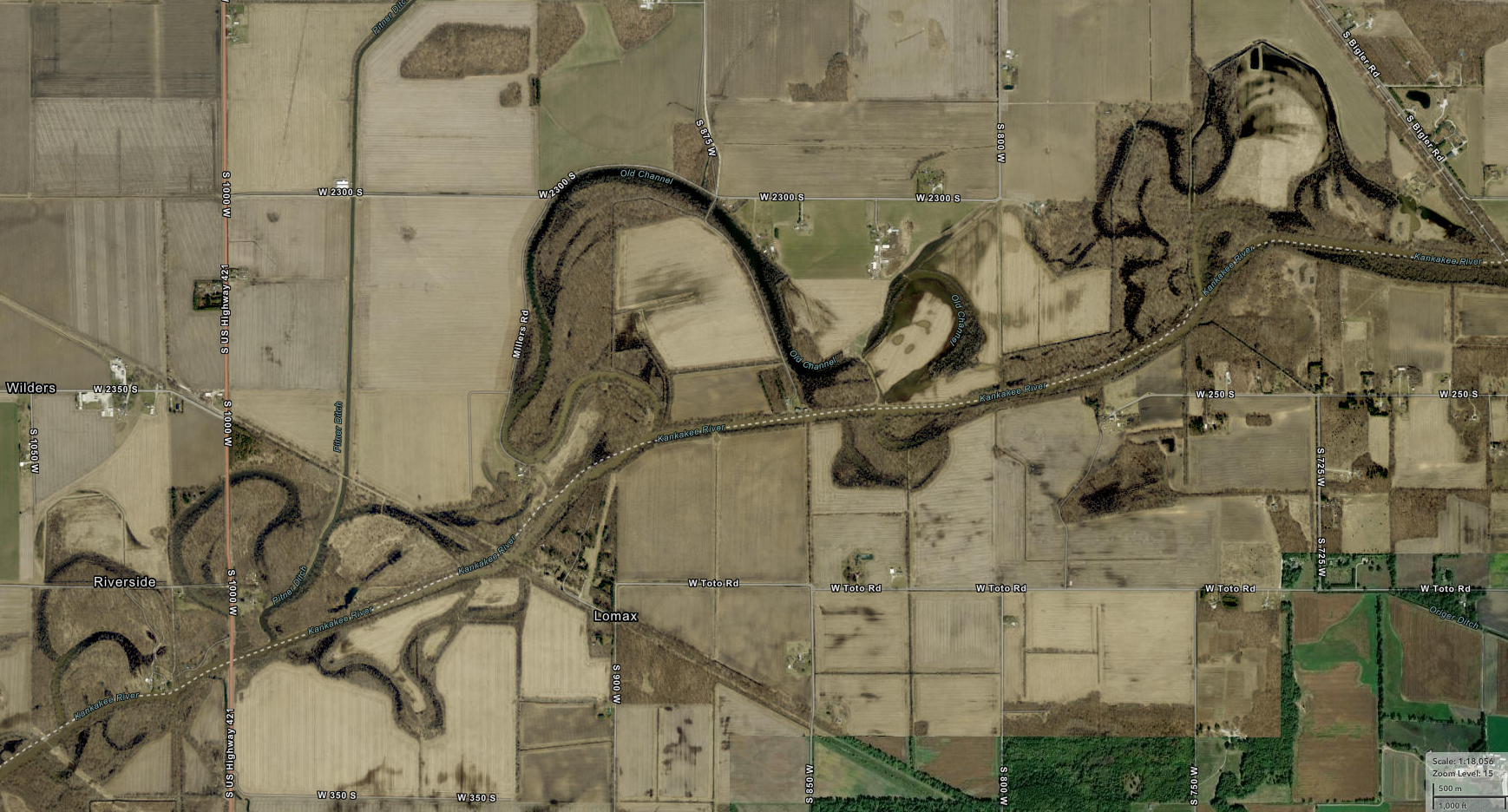
Engineers eliminated natural meanders to deepen and widen the channel for both agricultural demands and 19th-century aesthetics, which prioritized geometric order over ecological complexity. Proponents dismissed dissenters as ignorant, while critics warned against human hubris; one detractor famously stated, "God never made a straight river, and I don't think man can improve on his general plans."

Indiana sought to drain the Kankakee Marsh by removing the limestone ledge located 7 miles (11 km) into Illinois. Delays in financing the project continued through the late 1880s. In 1891, the Indiana Legislature authorized a board to oversee the removal of an estimated 68,819 cubic yards of rock, allocating $60,000. The project faced potential legal friction, with officials concerned that Illinois might block crews from crossing state lines to perform the blasting.

The rock was partially destroyed by the project in 1893, which created a channel 8,649 feet (2,636 m) long, 300 feet (91 m) wide. The bedrock outcropping was lowered by 2.5 feet (0.76 m) to increase the speed of water flow, despite some boulders preventing total drainage.

Aggressive channelization and drainage soon followed with steam dredges. To accelerate drainage, massive arterial ditches were constructed alongside the new Kankakee channel. While the marsh's natural elevation dropped only 6–18 inches per mile (9.5–28.4 cm/km), ditches were engineered with slopes of 1–5 feet per mile (0.19–0.95 m/km) to gravity-drain surface water.

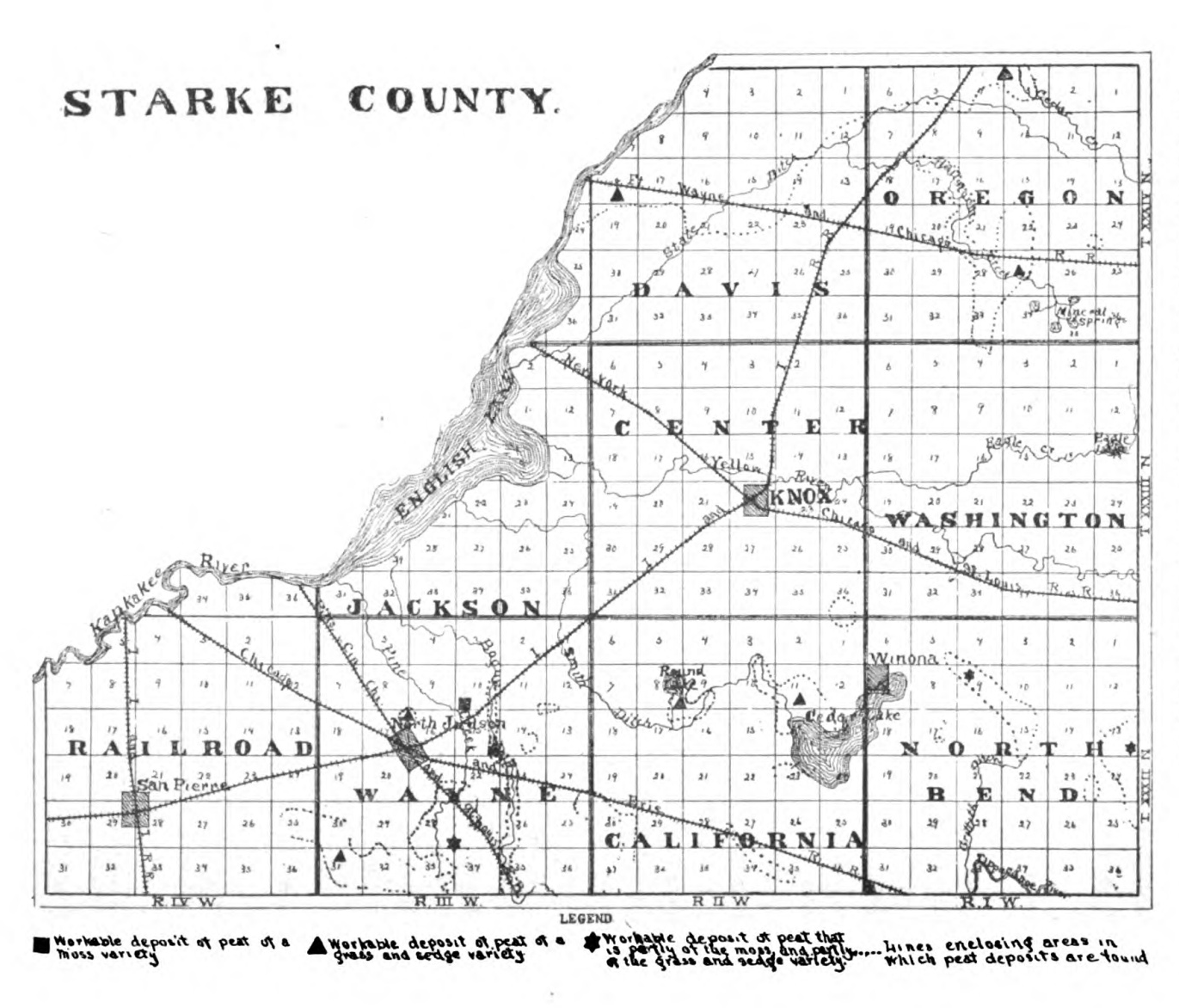
By 1906, 46 miles (74 km) of the Kankakee River between St. Joseph and Starke counties had been dredged. English Lake, seen on this 1906 Starke County map, was transformed into cornfields.

By 1897, most of the eastern Kankakee Marsh was drained. Rapid drainage and deforestation degraded local forests, fruit crops, and soil fertility. Farmers realized how over-excessive ditching and deforestation was harming the soil's ability to renew itself naturally. As the Indiana General Assembly allocated $2.5 million to develop the land, dredgers and speculators clashed with farmers and locals in what businessmen described as a battle of "ignorance and prejudice" versus "brains and capital."

By 1898, steam-powered drainage had transformed wetlands into farmland valued at $5 to $300 per acre, facilitated by rail access. Investors utilized tenant farmers and intensive tiling to exploit the soil, actively targeting the richest marshlands for drainage. The "land poor", people who had bought wetlands at low prices in the mid-19th century, profited from drainage decades later.

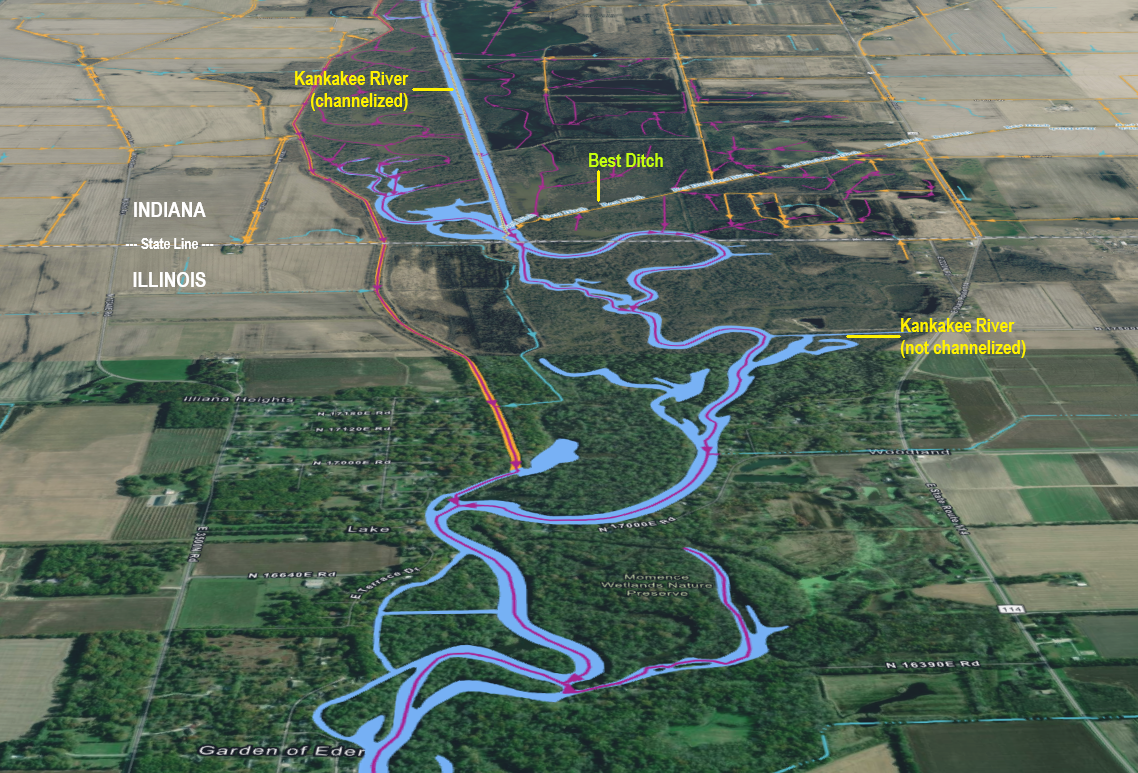
A USGS National Map 3D view of how Kankakee River channelization, seen here in blue highlights, flows in a straight line until the Illinois border. The river was never channelized in Illinois, and retains its original meanders. Directional arrows indicate water flowing naturally through the Momence Wetlands Nature Preserve.

Kankakee River channelization reportedly concluded in 1917 at the Indiana border; the river was never channelized in Illinois. Other sources report dredging did not reach the Indiana and Illinois state line until the fall of 1922, when it was stopped by complaints and concerns by the Illinois government and the people of Momence. This $1.2 million project, funded by local land assessments, shortened the river from 250 miles (400 km) to 83 miles (134 km), eliminating all wetlands.

In 1927, the final removal of the Momence boulders accelerated water flow, turning the river into a high-velocity sluice transporting heavy sand loads from Indiana into the original meanders of the Illinois reach. The old river meanders in Indiana became disconnected oxbow ponds or dried up. A straight channel replaced the Kankakee's winding river. Water that used to spread out over swamps and marshes was now confined within dredged channels.

Forest and Stream eulogized these changes, stating:

"The porous bog has sunk and settled and changed into some of the richest black farming soil that ever lay out of doors. The meadows are running out into the marsh, and the cornfields are following the meadows. The Kankakee is whipped, beaten, defeated and subdued. A shallow, trivial stream, a mockery of its former self, it hurries on through the wide realm which was once its own as though glad to leave the scene of its departed greatness. The marshes are no more. In time the farms will spread still more widely over them. This is the passing of the Kankakee."

=== Fate of the environment ===
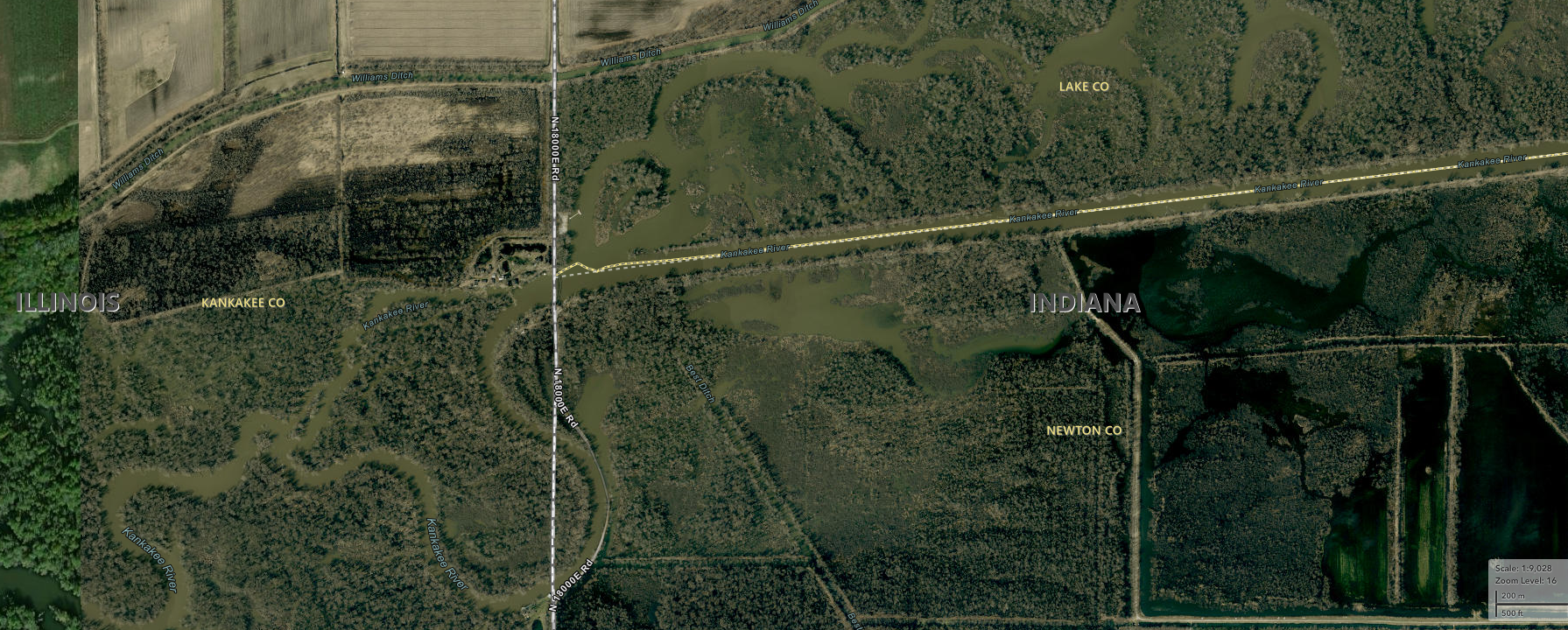
"Sand choking" at the Illinois border obstructs flow and worsens flooding. Sediment pollutes historically clear waters. Persistent river meandering and heavy storms erode riverside banks of sediment.

Mid-19th century Indiana did not view the draining of the Grand Kankakee Marsh as resource depletion, environmental degradation, biodiversity loss, or ecosystem collapse. They instead viewed it as the "redeeming" of "unimproved" lands for human use.

The Indiana State Board of Agriculture had aimed to emulate European drainage models, reframing wetlands as agricultural assets. By 1911, steam-powered dredging had converted the landscape into a grid of ditches, creating a strong agricultural economy. Land values surged from $2 per acre as wetlands to $40–$75 as cornfields.

While many in 1925 celebrated the project as a success, others lamented the loss of a premier North American bird refuge. Proponents dismissed dissenters as "ignorant," prioritizing short-term profit over ecological preservation. One proponent noted, "Forests were to be felled, cabins erected, mills built and the rivers and creeks made to labor for the benefit of mankind."

In contrast, another historian noted how utilitarianism influenced the marsh's destruction, stating:

Fields of corn and wheat stretch over the reclaimed acres, for the utilitarian has triumphed over beauty and nature's providence for his wild creatures. The destruction of one of the most valuable bird refuges on the continent has almost been completed, for the sake of immediate wealth. The realization of this great economic wrong must be left to future generations.

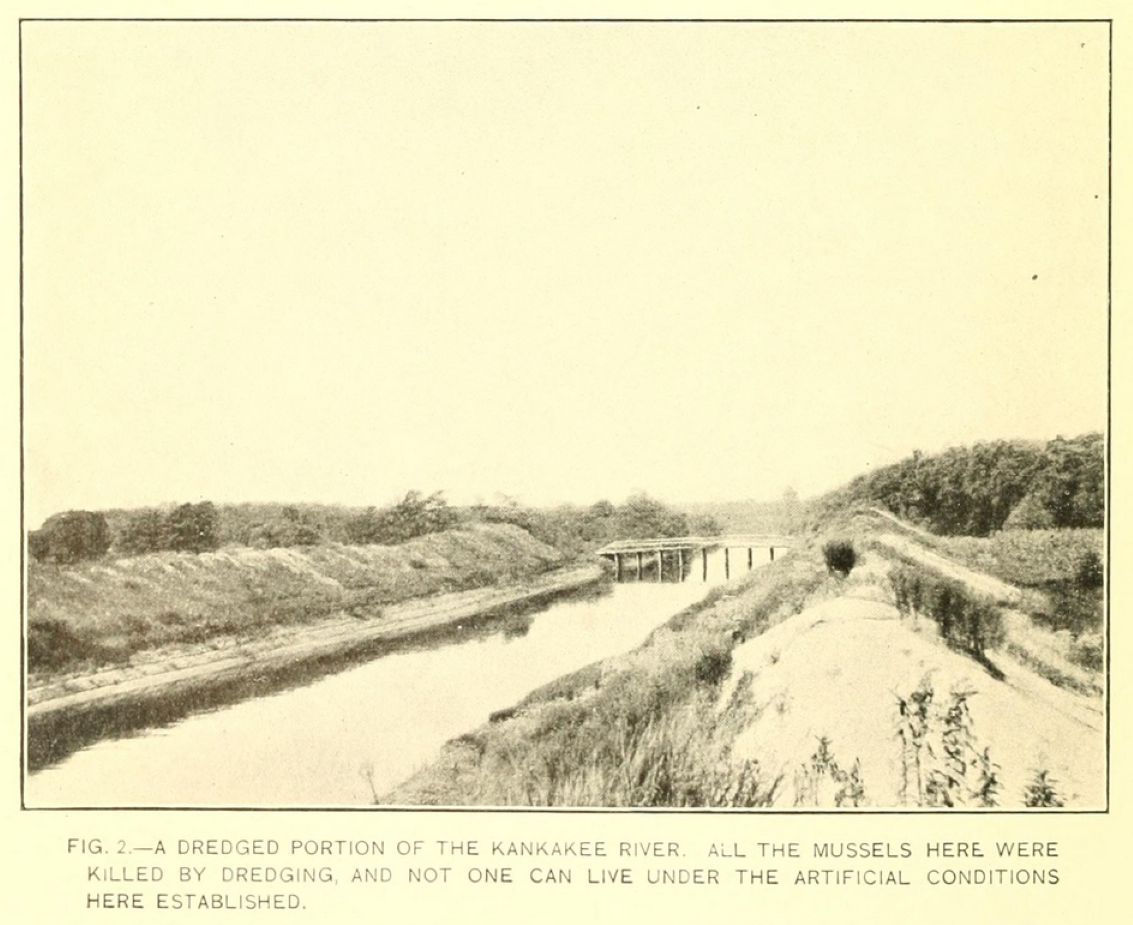
Dredging reduced mussel habitat. One observer of the drainage remarked, "They murdered this land while they were at it, and made a good job of it!"

Scholars have argued utilitarian mindsets often struggle to account for empathy or conservation. Swamps in Starke County were deemed "worthless" by settlers. In Lake County, Cedar Lake's marshes were deemed "worthless" and were drained with a ditch, which lowered lake water levels and reduced its groundwater supply. The marsh in St. Joseph County was deemed "utterly useless" until it was drained for farming. Wetlands were called "bogus places" if the soils were too saturated and required deeper tile drainage for farming.

Forest and Stream reported that the "main ditch", formerly the Kankakee River, contained no bass, and, observing cornfields where wetlands once stood, declared that "the glory of the Kankakee has assuredly departed." The publication noted ditching financially crippled hunting clubs.

Hunters cited drainage as the primary driver of wildlife displacement. One hunter stated, "drainage has been the most potent factor in driving the birds away." By 1897, wild rice became scarce across the region.

Hunters persisted near Momence, reporting to Forest and Stream the rest of the region was "ruined" and "as dry as a bone." Draining eliminated bird nesting sites, altered migratory patterns, and caused wetlands to become "dry and dusty."

Draining wet prairies exposed peat, creating significant fire hazards as the material dried and reduced to ash. These fires were often misattributed to drought, despite suspicions of arson. High winds frequently fanned flames that ignited trapped gases, burning as deep as 10–15 feet (3.0–4.6 m) into the ground. Hunting clubs lost land to fires. Fires fueled by drained peat destroyed prairies and bird habitats.

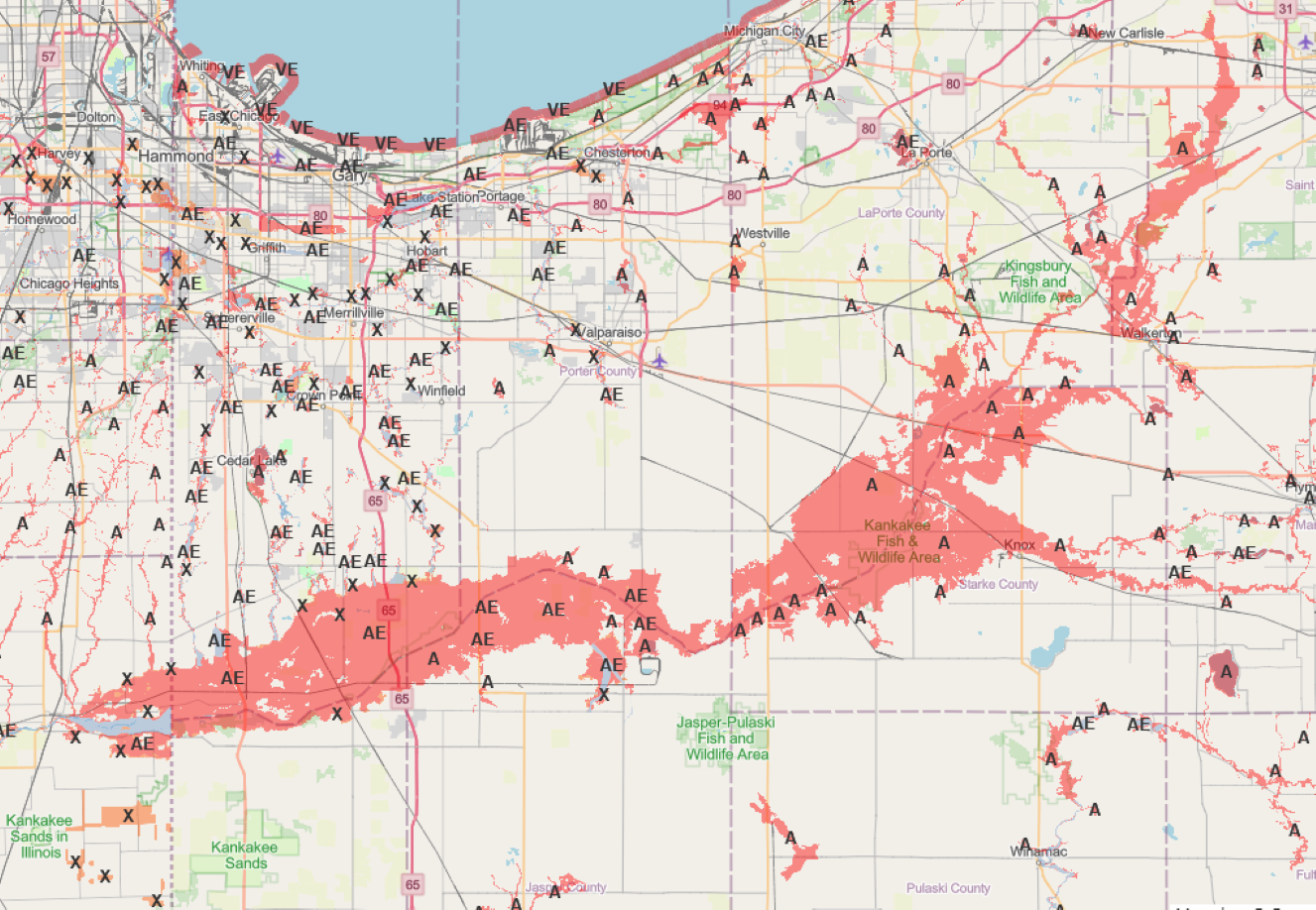
FEMA flood zones (in red) follow the former Kankakee Marsh outline.

Frequent floods prevented successful farming in certain areas. Over 100,000 acres (40,000 ha) along the Kankakee River have been exposed to seasonal flooding since dredging and river straightening concluded by 1920, leading to millions of dollars worth of damages. Current mitigation of flood damage includes deepening ditches and implementing flood insurance programs for farmers.

Excess sediment is dredged in the Kankakee River at the Illinois border, despite agricultural drainage issues created by Indiana which harm aquatic habitats and cause floods. Failed drainage also exposed former wetlands to severe erosion, creating localized deserts.

By 1926, the Indiana Department of Conservation criticized the "chase after the almighty dollar" that sacrificed the state's natural legacy.

=== Economic and population growth ===
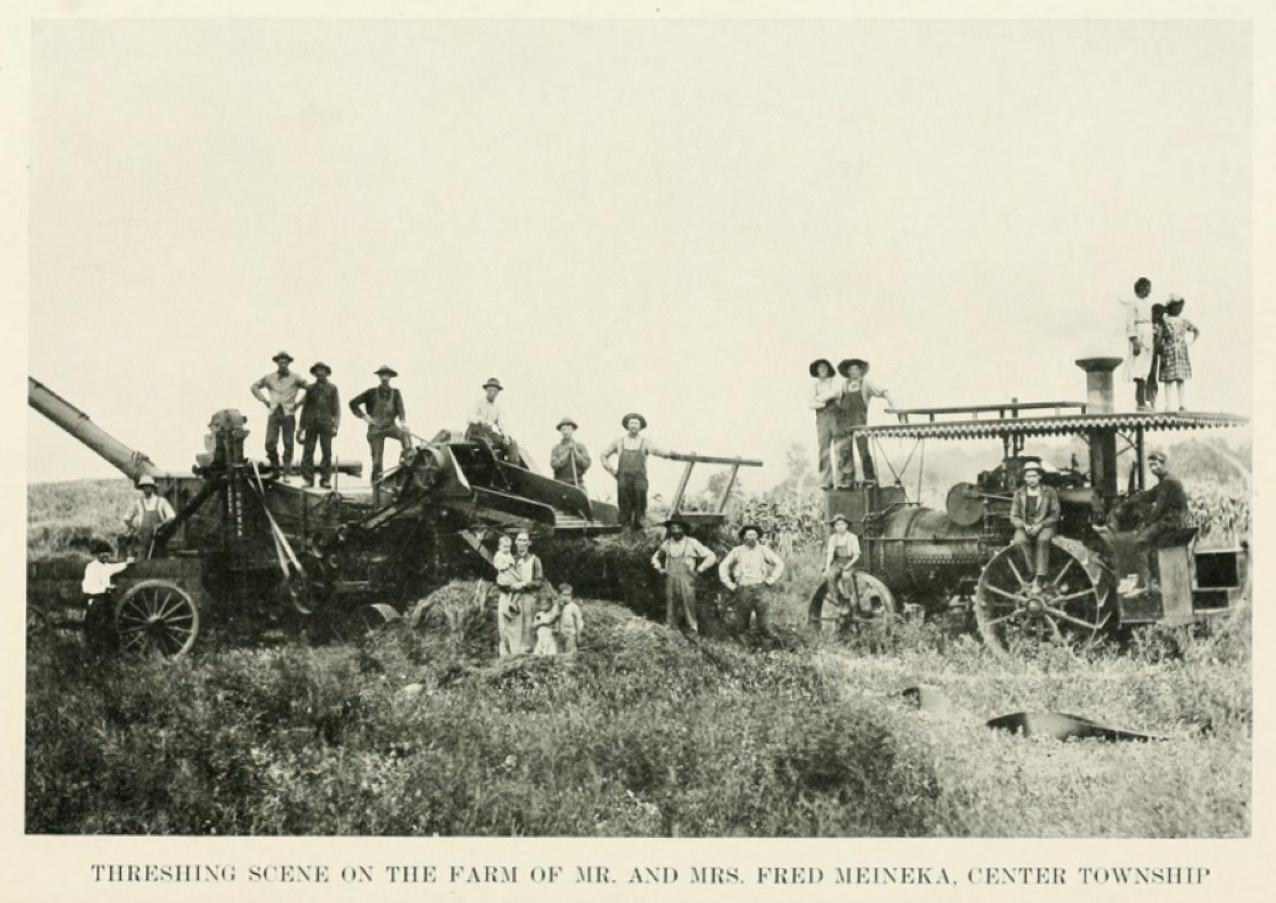
The population of the former Kankakee Marsh region grew significantly over the past 145 years. Expanded railways and roads facilitated transport of produce, machinery, and livestock. Proximity to Chicago markets increased the region's agricultural value.

By 1911, drained wetlands and "muck" farms were valued at $125–150 per acre. Despite high valuations, peat and muck soils lost productivity annually, requiring fertilizers and manure. Drainage also increased drought vulnerability. Excessive irrigation pumping has led to water level declines, impacting soil health and crop productivity.

Land value varied by soil quality. Island ridges were deforested for timber and farming, though drifting sand reduced their agricultural utility.

Drainage of the Yellow River marshes exposed former sand ridge islands to wind erosion, revealing Indigenous artifacts. Deforested ridges were repurposed for grazing, and new agricultural settlements and livestock farms emerged, such as the town near English Lake.

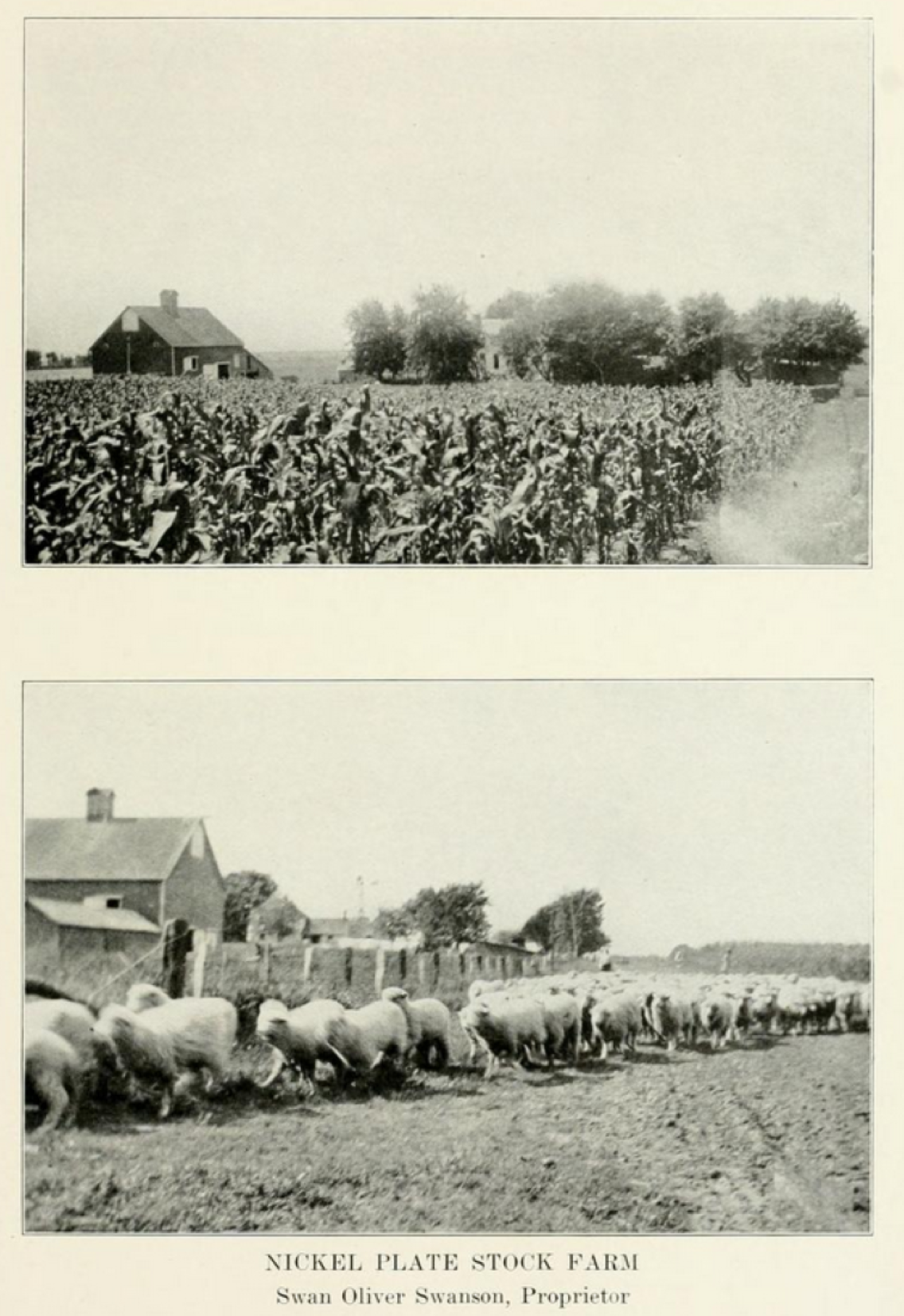
Townships prospered from the "reclamation" of the Kankakee Marsh. Early data tracked this agricultural development by county and township.

Railroad construction across the reclaimed Kankakee basin required constant gravel reinforcement to stabilize sinking marshland. Excavation revealed peat deposits up to 50 feet (15 m) deep, which were harvested for fuel. Expanding rail networks linked the basin to national markets.

Following the 1916 discovery of oil and gas near Thayer, pipelines were laid across the former English Lake floor to connect refineries to ports. This prompted widespread fraud, as shell companies sold fraudulent extraction shares to investors in Jasper and Pulaski counties.

Factories within the rail network utilized submerged clay for brick and tile production. Clays and chalks near South Bend were processed into Portland cement. The Kankakee River supplied water to sugar beet factories, favored for its low calcium sulfate content. Water mills harnessed local stream power.

The 1920 U.S. Census recorded 16,950 farms across the nine Kankakee Marsh counties of St. Joseph, Starke, LaPorte, Porter, Jasper, Pulaski, Lake, Newton, and Kankakee. They had a total population of 425,668 with crop values totaling $53,391,150 and livestock values totaling $24,699,954 (unadjusted).

By 2020, the nine Kankakee counties grew in population to 1,247,379. By 2022, the number of farms across the nine Kankakee counties decreased to 4,652, while crop revenues reached $1,669,470,000 and livestock revenues reached $847,843,000.

== Revival of the marsh ==
=== River restoration ===
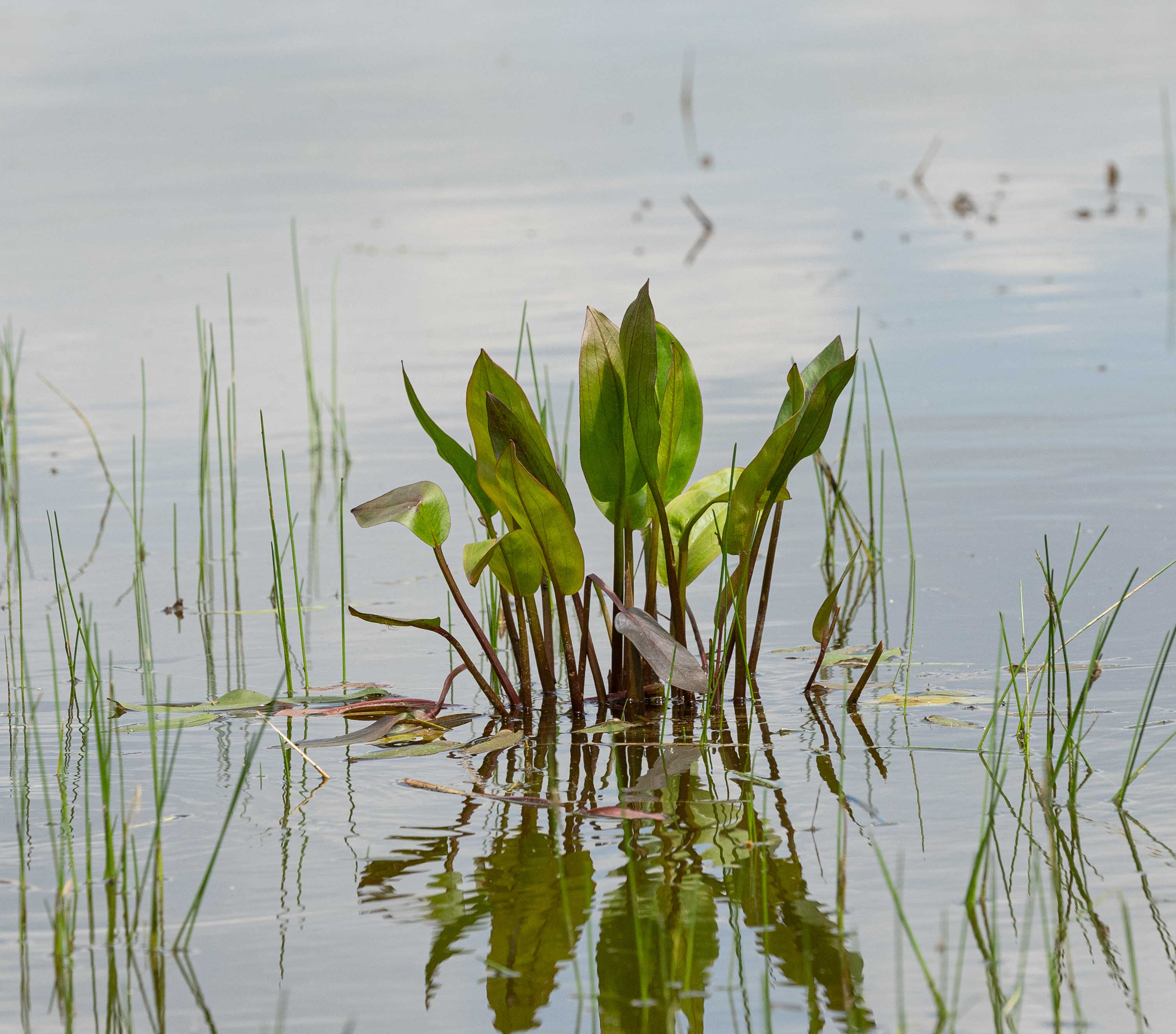
A restored wetland in Starke County. Kankakee restoration efforts can achieve plant richness, but some projects fail by neglecting hydrological and geological conditions.

Beginning in the 1890s, the Kankakee Marsh suffered from excessive development. Hunters, noting declining wildlife post-drainage, demanded conservation. In the early 20th century, Illinois banned the sale of most wild game. Only 6,000 acres (2,400 ha) remained under state control, later earmarked for conservation and recreation.

In 1923, 2,300 acres (930 ha) of the former English Lake were acquired as a game preserve, later managed by the Division of Fish and Game as the Kankakee Fish and Wildlife Area. The preserve currently holds 4,199 acres (1,699 ha) of habitat.

A second game preserve was established in Walker Township, south of the Kankakee River, on 520 acres (210 ha) of marginal farmland.

Mussel harvesting was banned in Kankakee River breeding grounds. The Division of Fish and Game stocked the river with native fish to bolster populations.

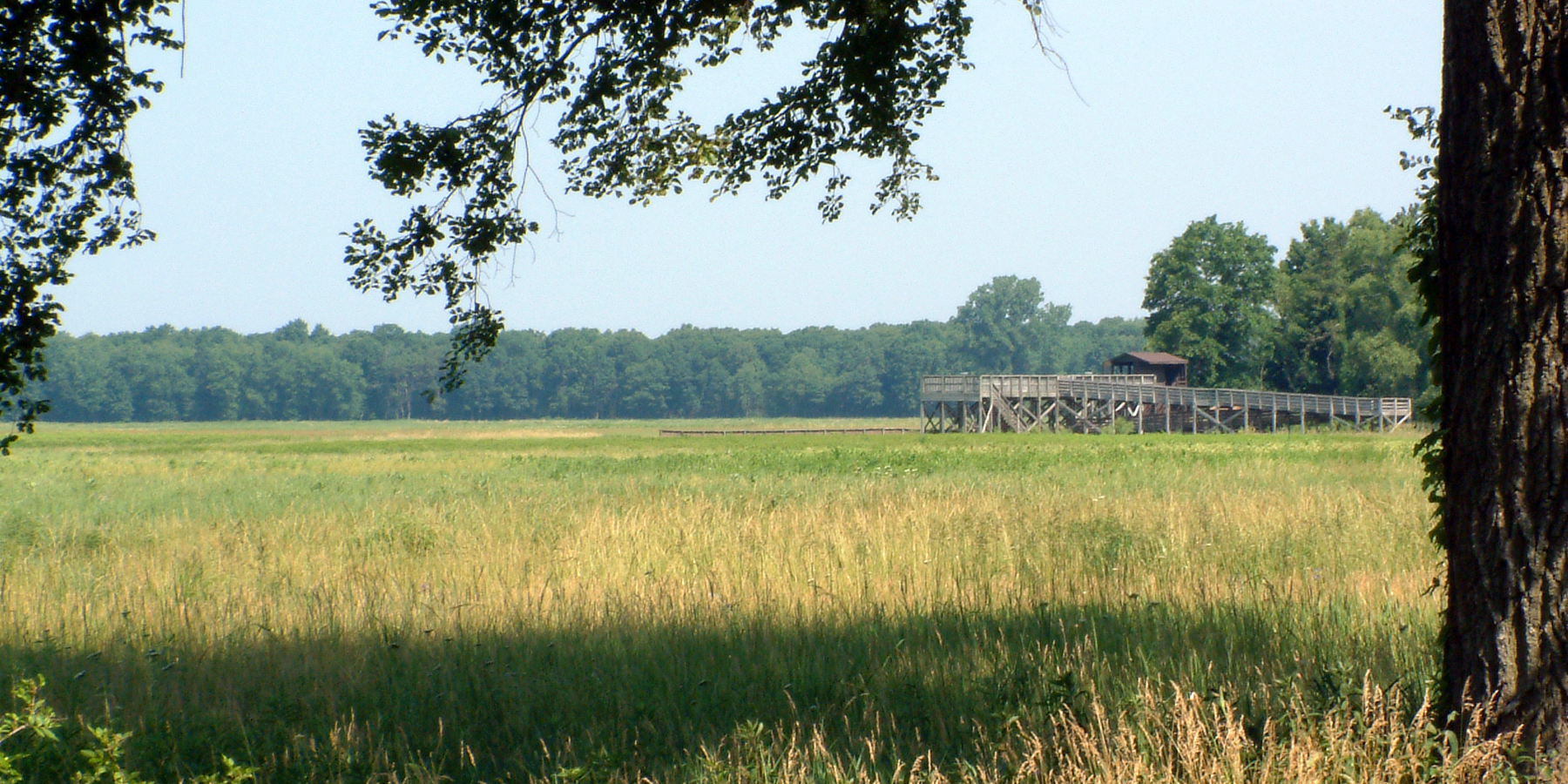
Jasper-Pulaski Fish and Wildlife Area, former Kankakee Marsh.

Since 1931, experts have studied restoring the Kankakee Marsh as a federal migratory bird refuge. In 1942, the Indiana Department of Conservation and the Izaak Walton League proposed a partial restoration of the Kankakee Marsh, but the plan was never fully implemented.

In the 1990s, the U.S. Fish and Wildlife Service (USFWS) proposed a 30,000-acre (12,000 ha) refuge to restore the Kankakee Marsh by dismantling regional drainage systems. Local landowners opposed the project, citing concerns over lost tax revenue, farm drainage, and flooding. The Momence Board rejected the proposal in 1998, criticizing the agency's failure to address sedimentation, flood control, and drainage district conflicts.

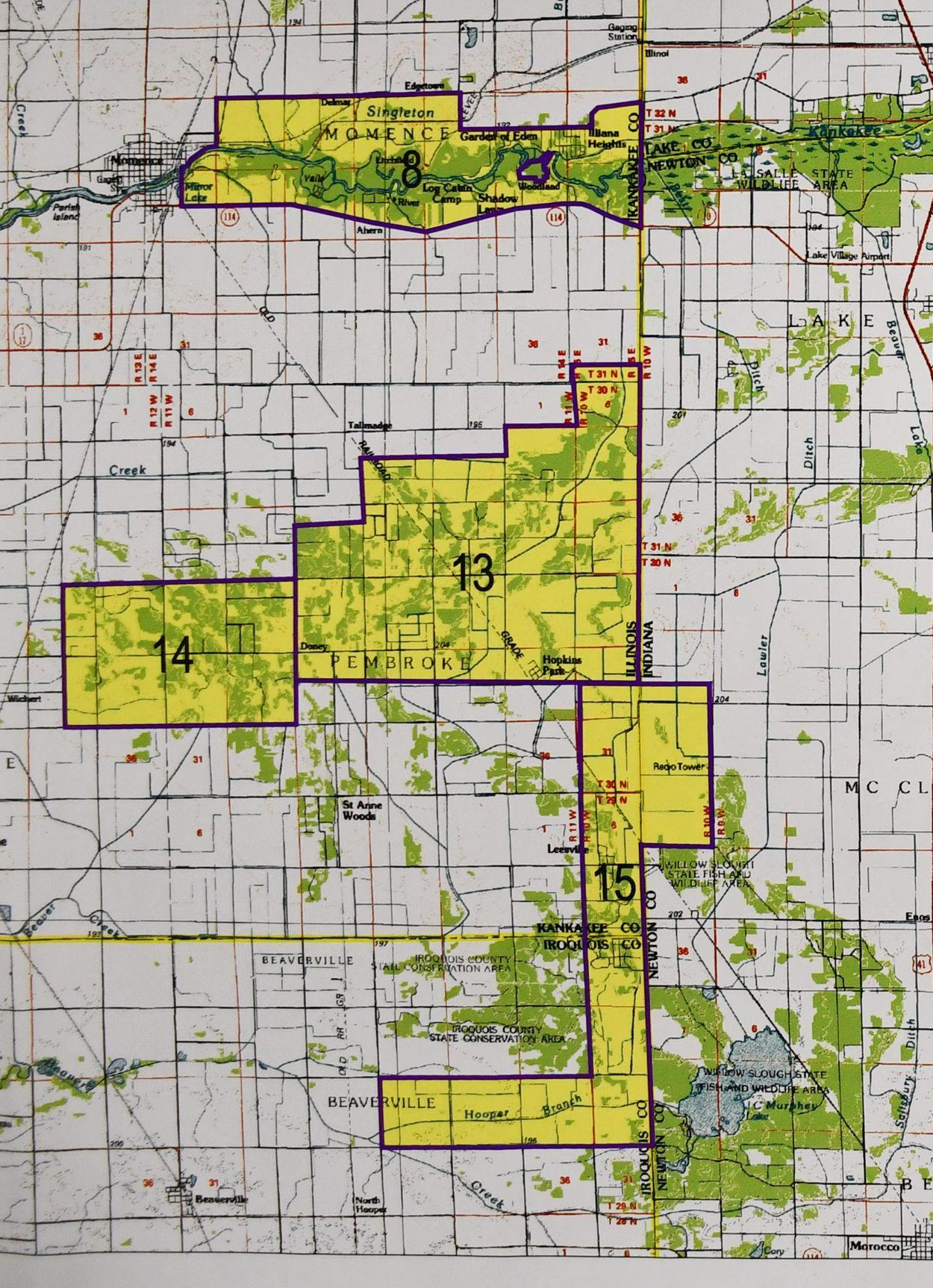
A refuge proposal for Kankakee County. Although public support for the project outweighed opposition in 1999, critics argued the USFWS ignored local concerns, noting that public meetings failed to yield collaborative resolutions with the farming community. A similar refuge proposal was rejected in 2021.

The Kankakee County Board opposed a 2021 proposal for a 28 square miles (73 km^{2}) refuge near Momence, Pembroke Township, and Hopkins Park. The board cited the loss of $1.2 million in annual property taxes, including $800,000 for the Momence School District.

Established in 2015, Lydick Bog is a 263-acre (106 ha) nature preserve in St. Joseph County, containing a rare, intact sphagnum bog. While minerotrophic marshes dominated lower valley elevations, ombrotrophic peatlands like Lydick Bog developed at higher northeastern elevations of the Kankakee Marsh. It supports diverse flora, including winterberry, tamarack, cranberry, maple, oak forest, oak savanna, hickory, and carnivorous species like round-leaved sundew and pitcher plants. The preserve protects Lydick Bog as one of the last remaining sphagnum bog habitats in Indiana.

In May 2016, the USFWS established the 66-acre (27 ha) Kankakee National Wildlife Refuge and Conservation Area in Iroquois County.

Organizations focused on reversing wildlife habitat loss include The Nature Conservancy and the Indiana DNR in remnants of the former Kankakee Marsh. They include Kankakee Sands, Willow Slough Fish and Wildlife Area, Conrad Savanna Nature Preserve, and Conrad Station Savanna. Adjacent to the former Beaver Lake are the Iroquois County State Wildlife Area and Hooper Branch Savanna Nature Preserve.

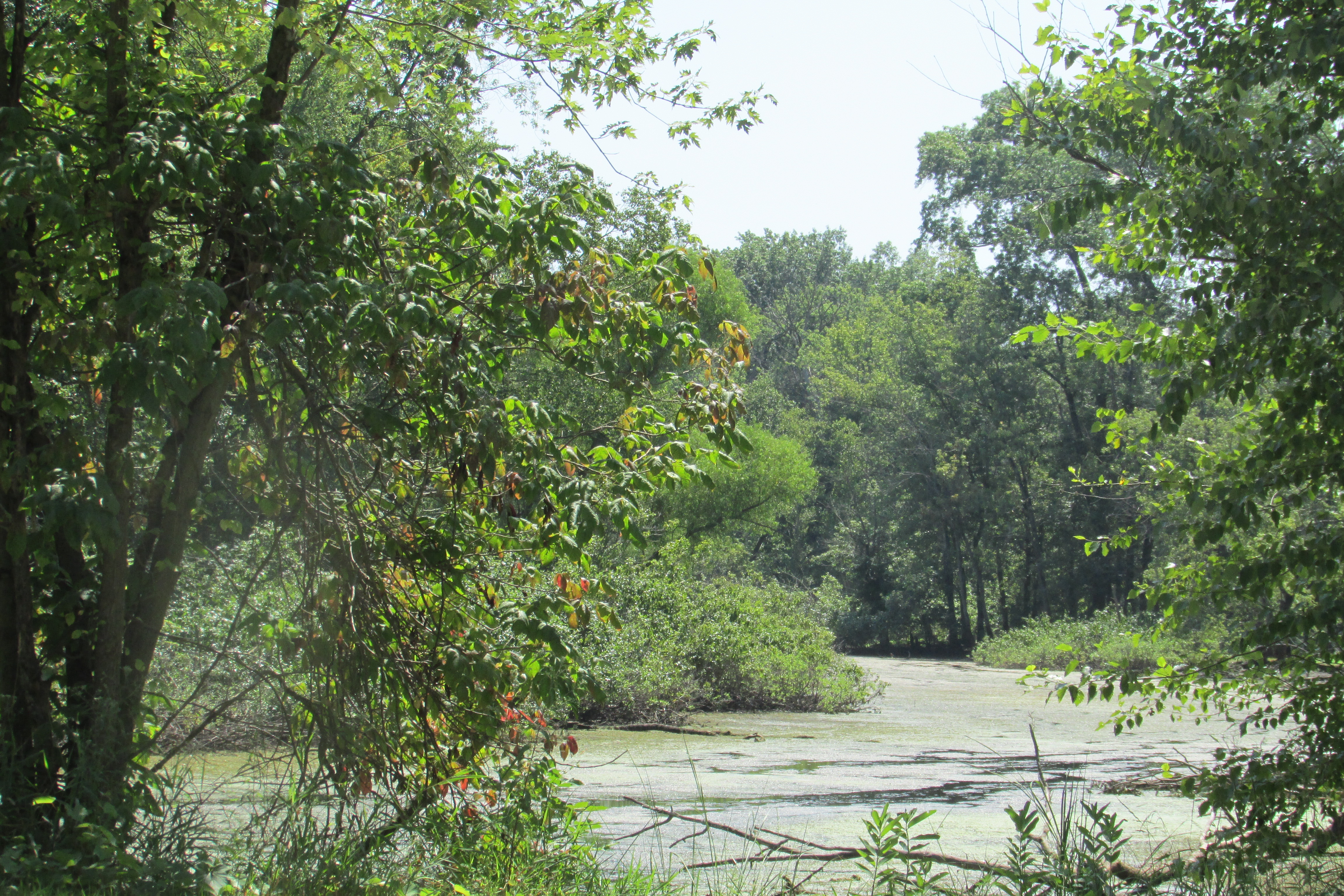
The Momence Wetlands retain the natural meanders of the Kankakee, and provide habitats for rare species.

The Momence Wetlands Reach, spanning the Indiana-Illinois border, suffers from excessive sedimentation caused by upstream river channelization. In 2000, the Kankakee River deposited up to 130,000–150,000 cubic yards (99,000–115,000 m^{3}) of sediment at the state line annually. This buildup degrades vital wetland functions, including flood control, water quality, and habitat protection, threatening regional ecological and economic health.

Conservation projects have faced public scrutiny. In Hopkins Park and Pembroke Township, reports indicate that conservation efforts conflict with the land-retention efforts of Black farmers. This tension is situated within a broader history of Black land loss in the United States where institutional racism in government policies contributed to a 90% decline in Black farm ownership nationwide since 1900. Part of the township's culture and traditions include the annual Pembroke Rodeo, founded by Thyrl Latting in 1964, which celebrates the history of Black cowboys.

=== Indigenous peoples today ===
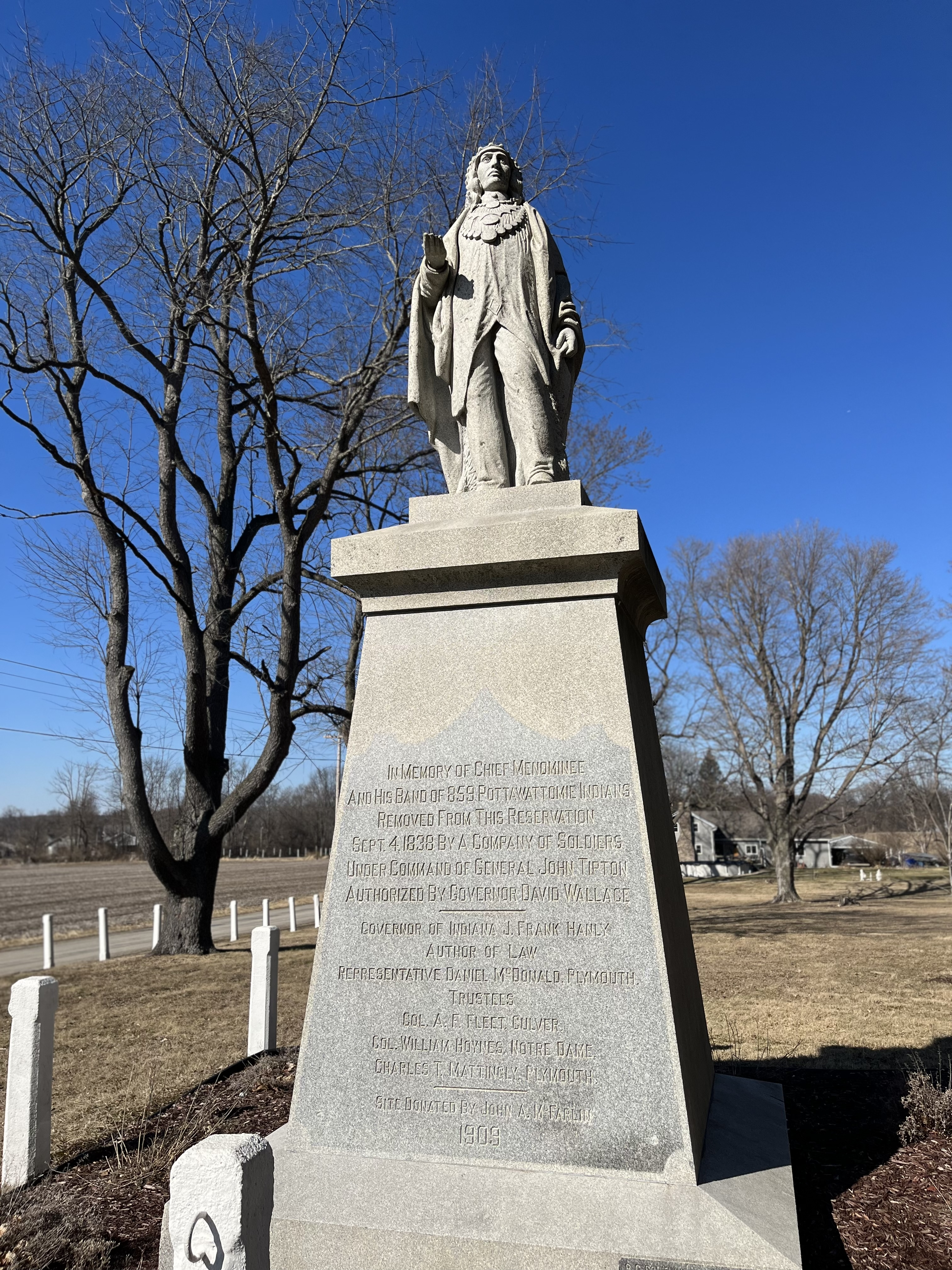
The Chief Menominee Memorial Site, east of the former Kankakee Marsh near Yellow River. It memorializes the 1838 Potawatomi Trail of Death.

In 2002, the U.S. Department of Agriculture (USDA) and its Natural Resources Conservation Service (NRCS) partnered with the Pokagon Band of Potawatomi Indians to restore 1,147 acres (464 ha) of the former Kankakee Marsh in North Liberty. The restoration work exists within a larger framework where Indigenous traditional ecological knowledge is gaining recognition from the U.S. EPA and other organizations for its benefits in land and nature management. Since the 1990s, the Pokagon Band has been reclaiming historic lands. In 2016, the Pokagon Band purchased 166 acres (67 ha) of land in South Bend (St. Joseph County) to build the Four Winds Casino, located on U.S. Route 31 in the headwaters of the former Kankakee Marsh.

Recent historians such as James Joseph Buss have explored historical misrepresentations of Indiana's Indigenous peoples, which portrayed their lands as "uninhabited wilderness." Buss also characterized the erasure of Indigenous peoples from Indiana's history as "literary genocide." Indiana historians in the 19th and early 20th centuries often misrepresented Indigenous history in the Kankakee Marsh, one of whom stated Newton County had "really no Indian history which can be depicted in distinct lines." Anti-Indigenous racist frameworks included the "Fire-Water Myth" in histories of the Kankakee region's Indigenous people. This genetic stereotype regarding alcohol and Native Americans has been identified by the Substance Abuse and Mental Health Services Administration (SAMHSA) and other organizations and scientists as scientifically baseless.

In 2026, historian Jon T. Coleman noted how the Vanishing Indian stereotype in the Kankakee Marsh misrepresented forced removal as "a natural outcome of progress" rather than a government policy serving settler interests. Timothy H. Ball and Marcus Ward Lyon Jr. applied the "Vanishing Indian" stereotype to the Kankakee's Indigenous history, which denies the Indian Removal Act's forced removal policies. In "Mammals of Indiana" (1936), Lyon Jr. further utilized scientific racism and eugenics to classify African-Americans as a "subspecies" and an "introduced" population, omitting the history of slavery and the Great Migration.

Indigenous graves were frequently desecrated by Kankakee Marsh farmers during soil cultivation. Plowing and bulldozing exposed and exhumed numerous burial mounds. Many archaeological sites and cemeteries were discovered when sand hills were leveled and bulldozed for farming. In Kankakee tributaries of Porter, Lake, and LaPorte counties, many burial mounds yielded human remains and funerary objects.

Efforts are underway in the 2020s to return Indigenous remains in museums and collections to their respective nations for reburial, as mandated by the Native American Graves Protection and Repatriation Act (NAGPRA). A 2022 report criticized Indiana for failing to comply with NAGPRA rules on returning burial remains. Indigenous nations from the Grand Kankakee Marsh and other Great Lakes regions suffered the psychological trauma of losing their ancestral lands and burial places. These graves were central to their cultural and spiritual beliefs, representing a sacred bond with their ancestors that was violently severed. This has contributed to their historical trauma.

Indigenous nations forcibly removed from the Kankakee Marsh region and relocated west of the Mississippi survived a series of harmful federal policies, including the Dawes Act, the 1956 Indian Relocation Act, and the mismanagement of reservations. They continue to resist historical denialism of Indigenous genocides. Today, members of the Pokagon Band of Potawatomi Indians include artists trying to revitalize their culture in Indiana through the arts.

== Legacy of the marsh ==
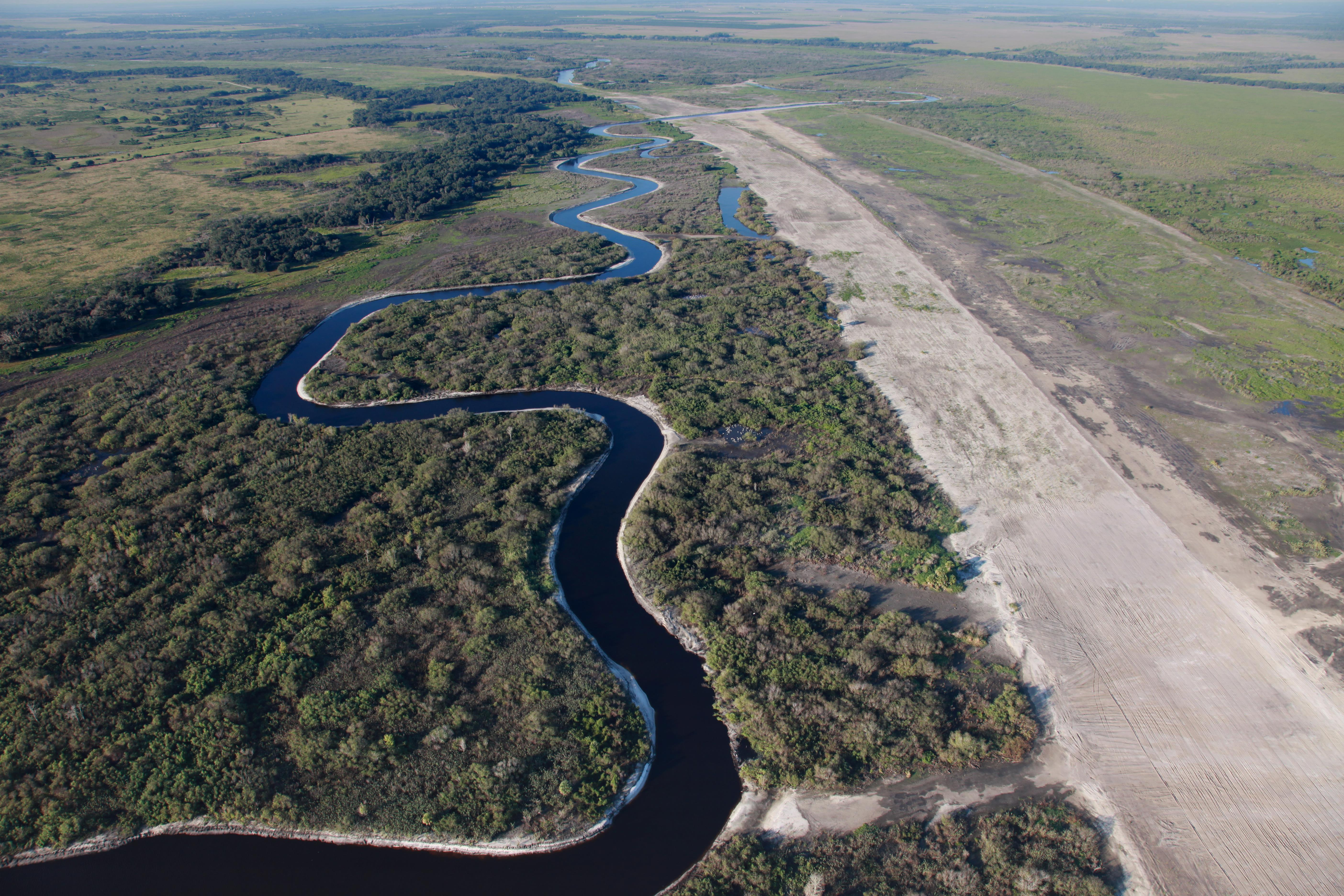
The lessons learned from the Kankakee Marsh's destruction have informed modern river engineering. One example is how the USACE partially restored the Kissimmee River in Florida, and man-made channels were backfilled to reconnect the river's original meanders and restore its hydrology and wetlands.

The Grand Kankakee Marsh no longer exists. Its history is remembered through the media, from newspapers to a 2020 Lakeshore PBS documentary, "Everglades of the North: The Story of the Grand Kankakee Marsh". Recent books on the marsh include 2025's Changing Landscapes of Northwest Indiana: Draining Beaver Lake and the Kankakee Marsh by Michael Dobberstein, and 2026's The Most Crooked River in the World: The Waters of the Kankakee and the Nature of Time by Jon T. Coleman.

The loss of wetlands like the Grand Kankakee Marsh drives wetland conservation movements nationally and globally. While the historical drainage converted the region into highly productive farmland, environmental groups currently advocate for the restoration of approximately 10% of the original marshland by reconnecting the river's historic meanders. In 2001, the U.S. Army Corps of Engineers (USACE) recommended similar restoration strategies for restoring the Kankakee River, including reconnecting isolated meanders.

Recent legal challenges complicate conservation efforts by removing wetland protections to facilitate development. In 2021, the Indiana legislature removed protections for Class I wetlands. In 2023, the law was further amended to ensure it is enforced. The 2023 Supreme Court ruling in Sackett v. EPA has also created obstacles for U.S. wetland protection by focusing on private land-use rights. In 2024, the Indiana legislature passed a law to reduce Class III wetland protections. A 2025 report by the Natural Resources Defense Council (NRDC) argued the Sackett ruling threatens to remove protections for tens of millions of acres of existing wetlands, leaving them vulnerable to pollution and destruction.

Significant flooding has persisted over a century due to channelization, land elevations, and blocked drainage. Following 2018 flooding, officials launched a 40-year sediment and flood control plan, employing rock-filled filter bags to prevent bank scouring and erosion, as well as planting native vegetation and installing riprap on banks. However, drainage district regulations often hinder private restoration by requiring strict ditch and tile management to prevent flooding on neighboring croplands.

As climate change increases annual precipitation, floods worsen in the Kankakee region and require mitigation. Changes in precipitation also increase chances of runoff and infiltration of groundwater resources with chemical loads. By 2080, high-emissions scenarios project a 20% increase in the rate of the Kankakee's streamflow, increasing the chances of 100-year floods by 50%, and creating wetter winters and springs.

== See also ==
Destroyed wetlands

- Beaver Lake (Newton County, Indiana)
- Draining of the Mesopotamian Marshes
- The Fens
- Great Black Swamp
- Great Meadow, Ukraine
- Limberlost Swamp
- Tulare Lake

Living or restored wetlands

- Atchafalaya Basin
- Blackwater National Wildlife Refuge
- Carolina bays
- Cuvette Centrale
- Everglades
- Great Cypress Swamp
- Great Dismal Swamp
- Great Swamp National Wildlife Refuge
- Kopuatai Peat Dome
- Mer Bleue Bog
- Okefenokee Swamp
- Pantanal
- Pocosin
- Sundarbans
