= Kankakee Sands =

Restored prairie in Illinois and Indiana

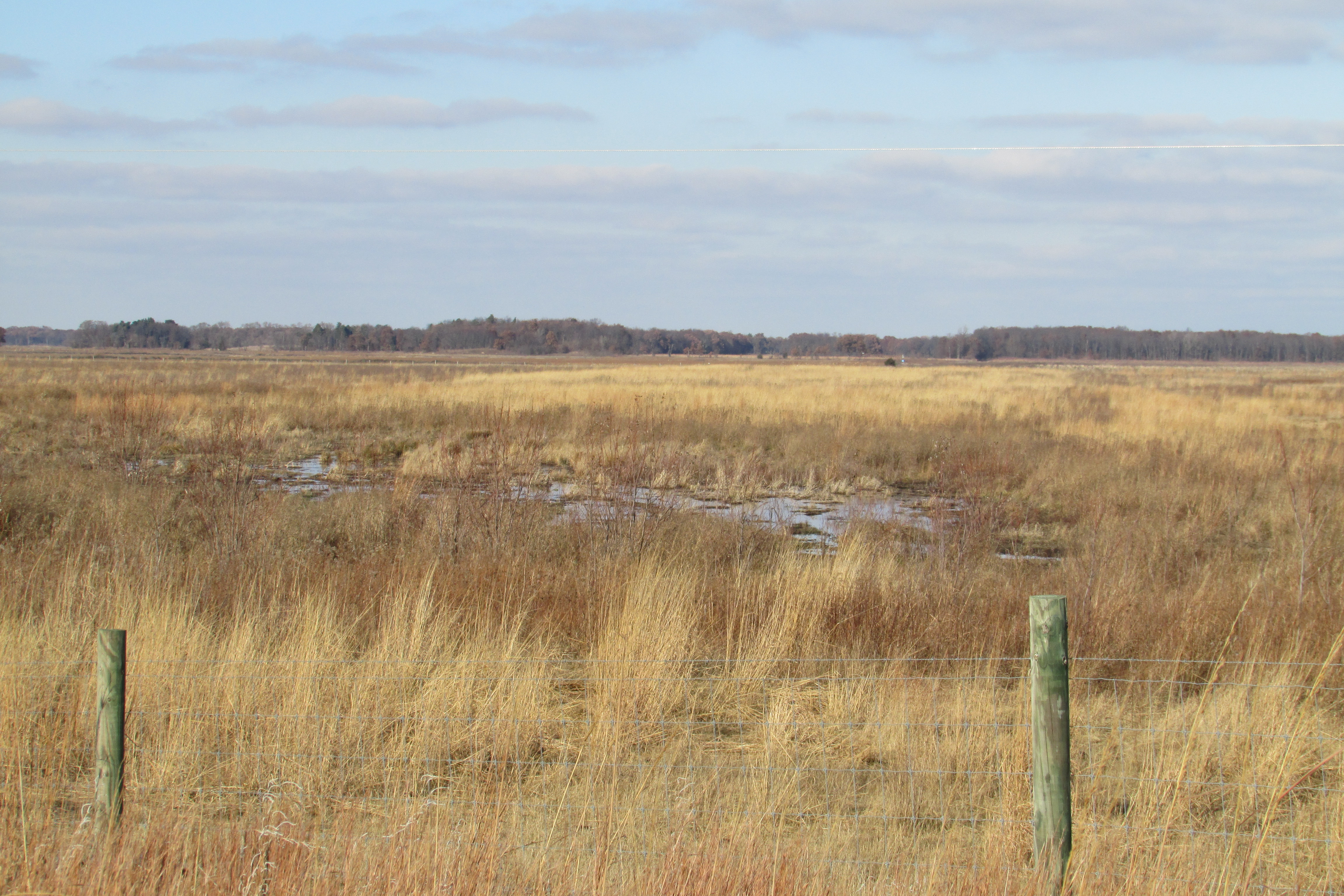
- Historic Beaver Lake area, drained in the early 1900s for farmland. Bogus Island is now the bison viewing area.

- Location within Indiana
- Nearest city: Morocco, Indiana
- Coordinates: 41°03′00″N 87°27′36″W
- Established: 2016
- Governing body: The Nature Conservancy

Kankakee Sands is a 10,000-acre (4,000 ha) complex of tallgrass prairie and oak savanna restorations and remnants in Kankakee County, Illinois and Newton County, Indiana. It is managed by The Nature Conservancy staff and volunteers. The Efroymson Restoration at Kankakee Sands is 8,400 acres (3,400 ha) of prairies and wetlands connecting Willow Slough Fish and Wildlife Area, Beaver Lake Nature Preserve, Conrad Savanna Nature Preserve and Conrad Station Savanna. This creates over 20,000 acres (8,100 ha) of dry, mesic and wet sand prairies, sand blows, sedge meadows, wetlands, and black oak savannas.

== History ==
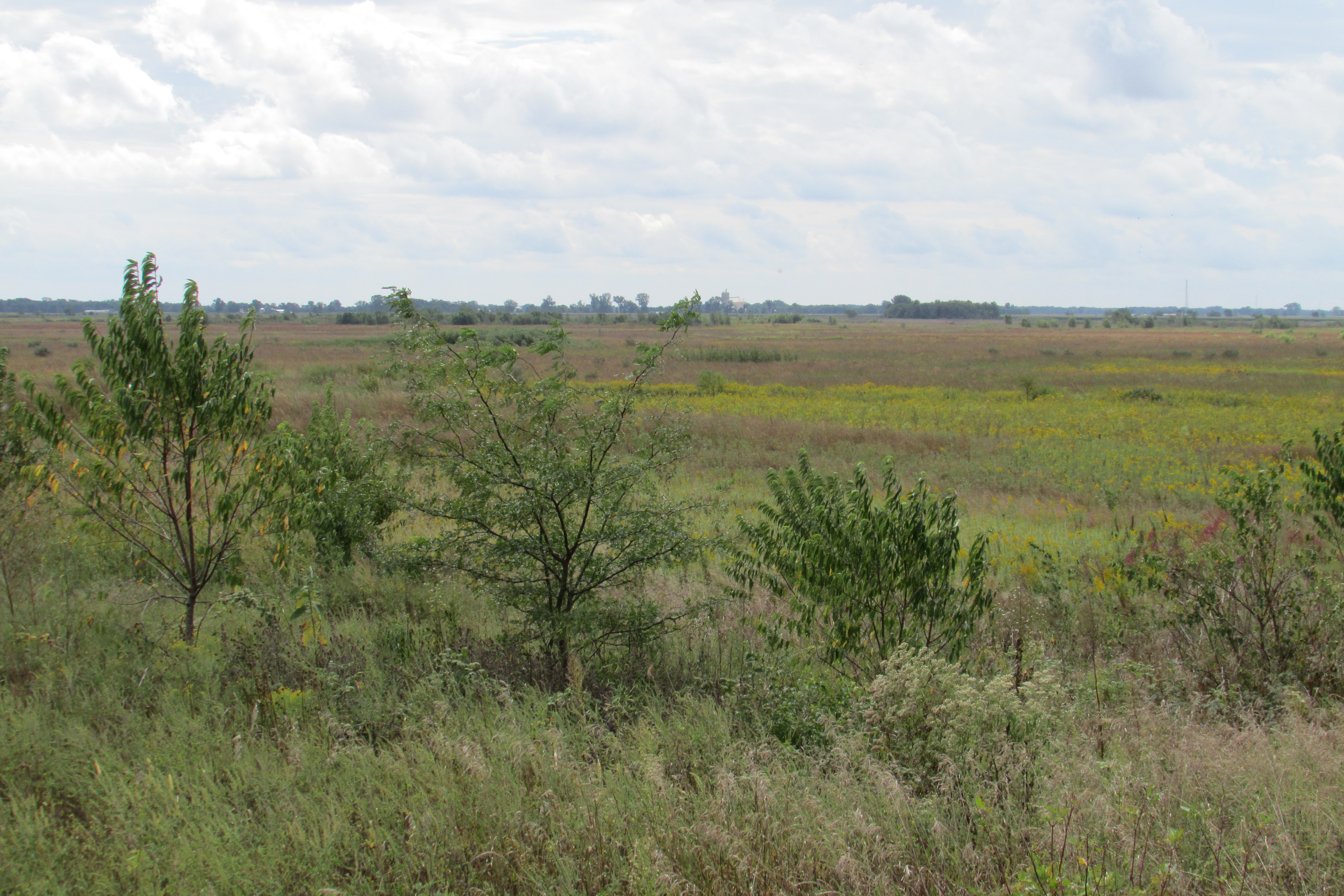
Bogus Island once stood in the middle of Beaver Lake.

About 14,000 to 16,000 years ago, sands were deposited from glacial melt waters flowing from the retreating Laurentide ice sheet during the Wisconsin glaciation.

This area is part of the Grand Kankakee Marsh system and the site of the largest natural lake in Indiana until it was drained. Beaver Lake was 7 miles (11 km) long and 5 miles (8.0 km) wide. As a shallow lake, only 10 feet (3.0 m) deep, it was filled with vegetation and wildlife. It was drained by the 1880s. The Nature Conservancy purchased 7,200 acres (2,900 ha) of farmland in 1996 with the aim of restoring as a prairie.

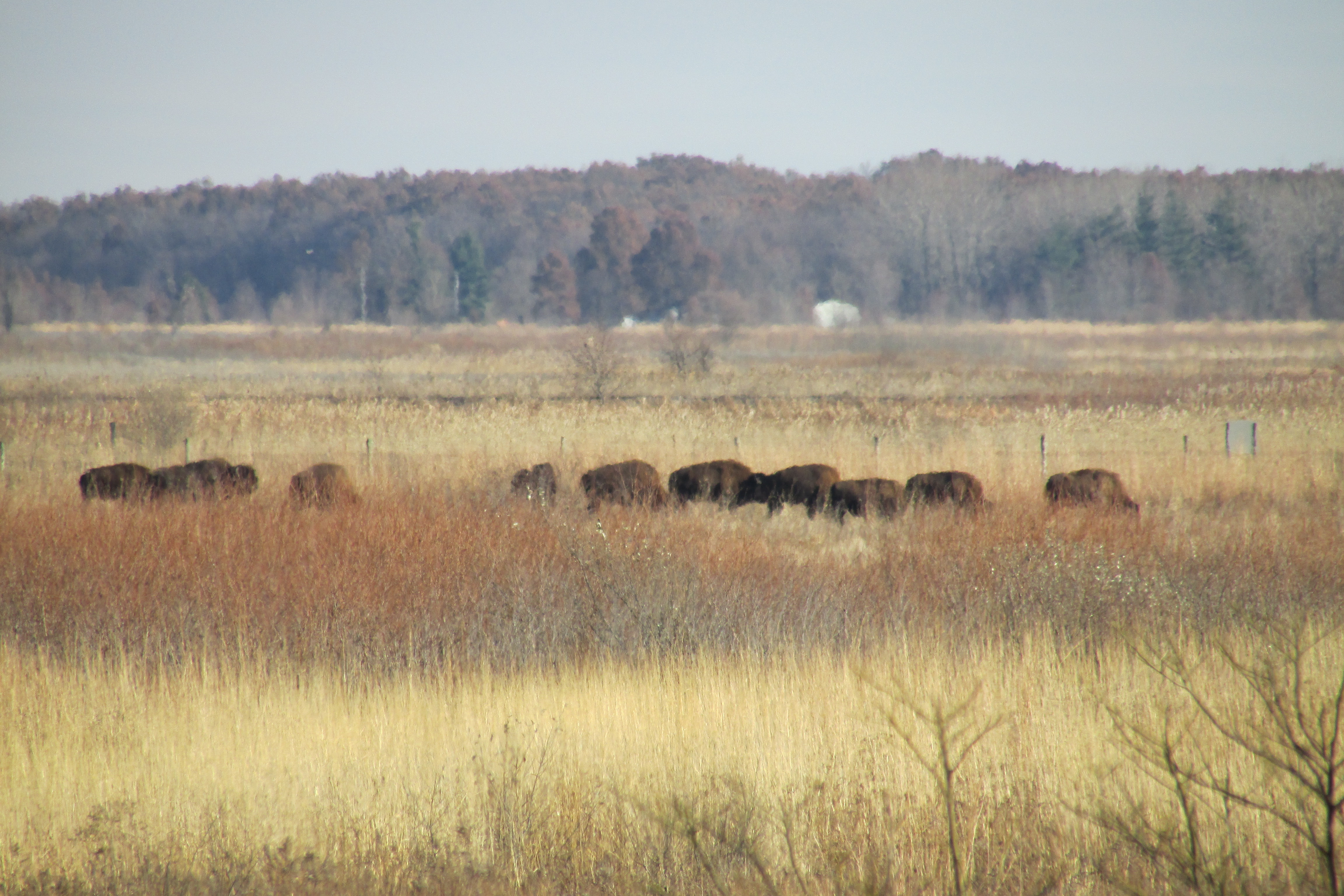
Bison (Bison bison) at Kankakee Sands Restoration Area.

Bison roamed through Indiana when the eastern pioneers first arrived in the state. Explorers reported bison in the 1600s and 1700s. An 1824 traveler encountered a single bison near the modern location of the preserve and shot it. Bison were extirpated from Indiana by 1830. Twenty-three American bison were introduced to the Kankakee Sands in October 2016. The bison are from the Wind Cave National Park. Bison were indigenous to Indiana until exterminated by 1790.

== Flora and fauna ==
The preserve supports a wide variety of plant and animal species. The bison provide management of the grasses on the prairie. They prefer grasses and sedges, leaving the flowering plants, which support a range of insects and animals. In addition, the bison, reduce the height of the plants, supporting ground dwelling birds. As of 2021 the bison herd had grown to more than 90 individuals.

- 772 plants: rattlesnake master (Eryngium yuccifolium), pricklypear cactus (Opuntia humifusa), beach wormwood (Artemisia caudata), roundheaded bush clover (Lespedeza capitata), Wild quinine (Parthenium integrifolium),
  - Prairie: lead plant (Amorpha canescens), smooth blue aster (Symphyotrichum laeve), New Jersey tea (Ceanothus americanus), woodland sunflower (Helianthus divaricatus), rough blazing star (Liatris aspera), wild blue lupine (Lupinus perennis), downy phlox (Phlox pilosa), purple milkwort (Polygama polygama v. obtusata), bracken fern (Pteridium aquilinum latiusculum), Carolina rose (Rosa carolina), lanceleaf figwort (Scrophularia lanceolata), goat's rue (Tephrosia virginiana), lance leaved violet (Viola lanceolata).
  - Sedges and grasses: little bluestem (Schizachyrium scoparium), Pennsylvania sedge (Carex pensylvanica),
  - Trees: white oak (Quercus alba), black oak (Quercus velutina), sassafras (Sassafras albidum),
  - Wet prairie: swamp milkweed (Asclepias incarnata), blue joint grass (Calamagrostis canadensis), fox sedge (Carex vulpinoidea), horsetail (Equisetum hyemale), blue flag iris (Iris virginica shrevei), cardinal flower (Lobelia cardinalis), great blue lobelia (Lobelia siphilitica), winged loosestrife (Lythrum alatum), hardstem bulrush (Scirpus acutus), green bulrush (Scirpus atrovirens), prairie cordgrass (Spartina pectinata)
- 68 butterflies: regal fritillary butterfly
- 153 bees
- 247 birds: Winter is the best time to see wintering owls and Rough-legged Hawks. From March thru June is best for seeing migrating and breeding prairie birds.
  - Grasslands: American kestrel, bobolink, brown-headed cowbird, dickcissel, eastern meadowlark, eastern kingbird, field sparrow, grasshopper sparrow, Henslow's sparrow, horned lark, lark sparrow, mourning dove, northern bobwhite, ring-necked pheasant, Savannah sparrow, upland sandpiper, vesper sparrow
  - Wetland-grasslands: American woodcock, common yellowthroat, Leconte's sparrow, marsh wren, Nelson's sharp-tailed sparrow, red-winged blackbird, sedge wren, swamp sparrow, yellow warbler, yellow-headed blackbird, Wilson's snipe
  - Shrubs: alder flycatcher, American goldfinch, American tree sparrow, Bell's vireo, blue grosbeak, brown thrasher, eastern towhee, fox sparrow, golden-crowned kinglet, gray catbird, house wren, indigo bunting, loggerhead shrike, northern mockingbird, northern cardinal, orchard oriole, ruby-crowned kinglet, ruby-throated hummingbird, song sparrow, tree swallow, white-crowned sparrow, white-throated sparrow, willow flycatcher
  - Ducks: blue-winged teal, bufflehead, Canada goose, common tern, gadwall, greater white-fronted goose, green-winged teal, hooded merganser, horned grebe, lesser scaup, mallard, mute swan, northern shoveler, northern pintail, redhead, ruddy duck, ring-necked duck, wood duck
  - Marshes: American coot, American bittern, black rail, night-heron, great blue heron, great egret, green heron, king rail, least bittern, pied-billed grebe, sandhill crane, snowy egret, sora, tricolored heron, Virginia rail, white ibis, white-faced ibis, yellow rail
  - Raptors: bald eagle, broad-winged hawk, merlin, peregrine falcon, red-shouldered hawk, rough-legged hawk, sharp-shinned hawk, Swainson's hawk, northern harrier, osprey, Cooper's hawk
- 9 snakes: e.g. milk snake, bull snake, hognose snake
- 2 lizards: e.g. six-lined racerunner, slender glass lizard
- 932 moths
- 10 amphibians: e.g. chorus frog, leopard frog, Fowler's toad, grey tree frog
- 33 mammals: e.g. plains pocket gopher
- 7 turtles: e.g. eastern box turtle

== Other Nature Conservancy bison herds ==
The conservancy maintains a dozen herds through North and South Dakota, Nebraska, Iowa, Illinois, Colorado, Kansas, Missouri, and Oklahoma. Conservancy bison herds:

- Broken Kettle Grasslands, Iowa
- Joseph H. Williams Tallgrass Prairie, Oklahoma
- Dunn Ranch Prairie, Missouri
