= Conrad Savanna Nature Preserve =

Nature preserve in Indiana, US

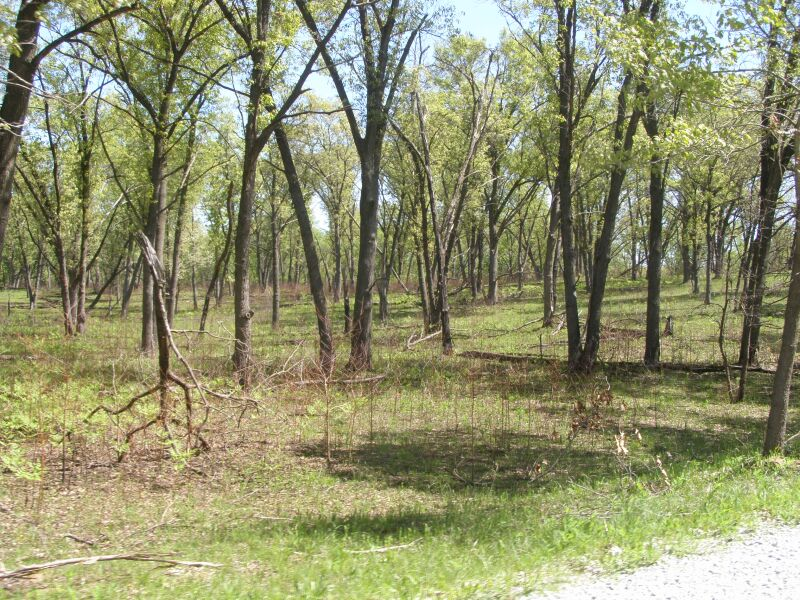
- Open oak savanna

- Location within Indiana
- Location: Newton County, Indiana
- Nearest city: Lake Village
- Coordinates: 41.101099°N 87.467953°W
- Area: 453 acres (183 ha)
- Governing body: Indiana Department of Natural Resources

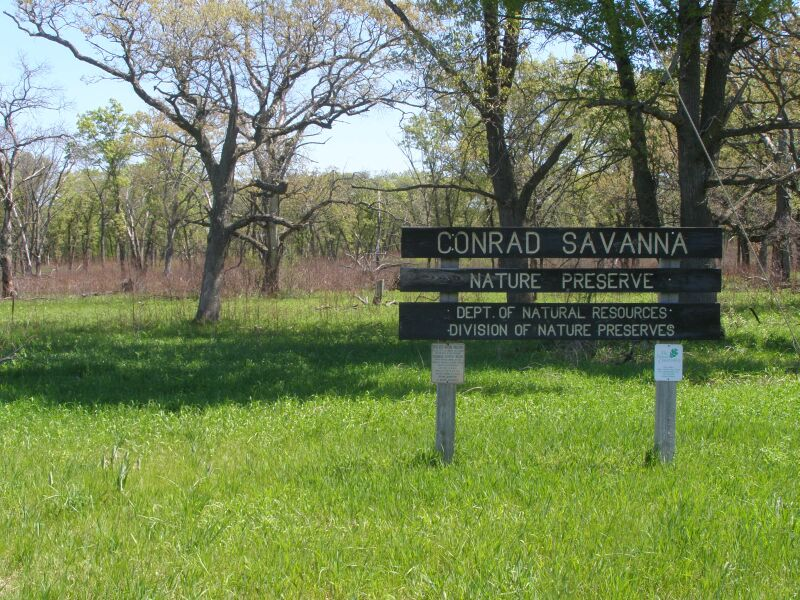
Sign at the corner of CR 700 N and CR 400 W

Conrad Savanna Nature Preserve is a 453-acre (183 ha) nature preserve located in Newton County, Indiana, 2.5 miles (4.0 km) south of Lake Village, just west of U.S. 41 on County Road 700 North. The savanna contains alternating rolling sand dunes and level areas. Typical of a savanna, it is covered by trees, grasses, and sedges. The dominant plants include Junegrass, Pennsylvania sedge, porcupine grass, little bluestem, Indian grass and big bluestem. The preserve is managed as by the Indiana Department of Natural Resources (IDNR).

== Habitat ==
The savanna has changed little from the period when eastern settlers first arrived south of the Kankakee River. The soil is a fine sand quartz, which covers the preserve and the areas surrounding it. It primarily occurs in the sand hills, much of the surrounding flatlands contains sand. Savannas in this region are dominated by oak trees. Oaks survive in the sands which shed water rapidly, creating drought-like conditions. Throughout northwest Indiana, the oak savannas are primarily black oak and white oaks. Typical dry prairie plants include hairy puccoon, goat's rue, blunt-leaved milkweed, leadplant, and New Jersey tea. These are in addition to the grasses listed above.

== Conrad Station Savanna ==
Conrad Station Savanna (also known as Conrad Station Nature Preserve) is east of Conrad Savanna Nature Preserve on County Road 725 North. A parking lot and trail area available at CR 725 N and CR 250 W. Like the Conrad Savanna, Conrad Station Savanna is dominated by savanna plants, including the hairy puccoon, cleft phlox (Phlox bifida), New Jersey tea and sand milkweed (Asclepias amplexicaulis). Along the trail, prickly pear cactus can be found in the small open rises. Savanna wildlife that is most readily seen includes a variety of birds, i.e., red-head woodpeckers, turkey and quail. The glass lizard is common. Because it lives most of its life underground, it is rarely seen. Conrad Station has an 1.8 miles (2.9 km) interpretive trail with information signs. It follows old fire roads through the preserve.

== Controlled burns ==
Both Conrad Savanna and Conrad Station use controlled burns to maintain the savannas. IDNR burned the savanna north of CR 700 N during the winter of 2010–11. Controlled burns are also common at Conrad Station. Depending on the burn schedule, each facility may be closed during the spring or fall burning seasons.
