= Sand milkweed =

Sand milkweed is a common name for several plant which may refer to:

- Asclepias amplexicaulis, native to eastern North America, including the Great Plains
- Asclepias arenaria, native to the Great Plains of North America
