= Beaver Lake (Newton County, Indiana) =

Former lake

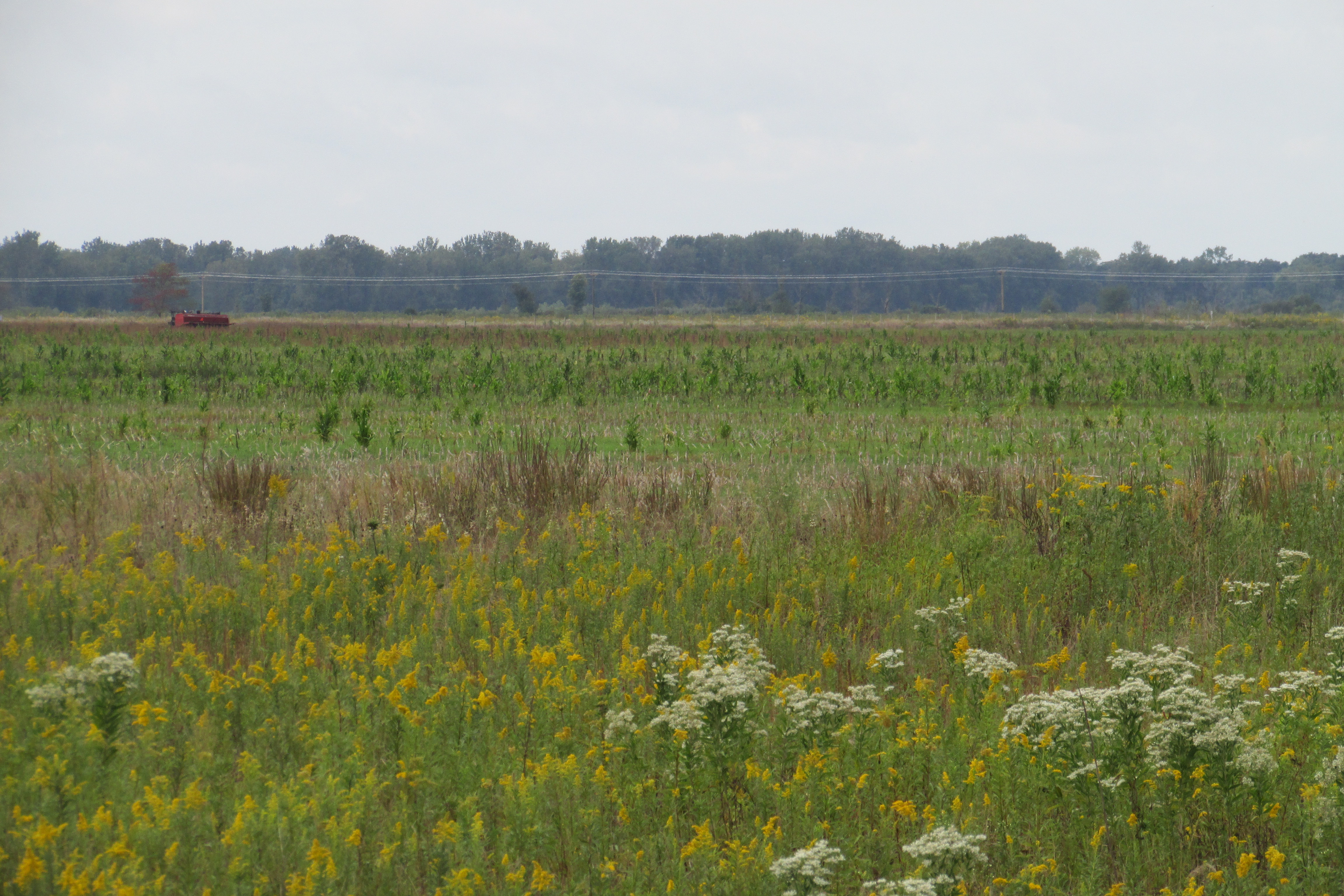
- The dry lake bed, 2019
- Interactive map of Beaver Lake
- Location: Newton County, Indiana
- Coordinates: 41.062397°N 87.449167°W
- Type: Former lake
- Part of: Grand Kankakee Marsh

Beaver Lake was once the largest lake in Indiana, and part of the Grand Kankakee Marsh. It was a shallow lake covering tens of thousands of acres and did not exceed fifteen feet in depth. It was home to scores of species of fish, waterfowl, and mammals. Among the animals native to the area was a healthy bald eagle population.

Before European settlement of Newton County, it provided resources for Native Americans. During Indiana's frontier days, the lake continued to provide food and furs for the early settlers. Due to its remoteness, criminals were known to hide out on the lake's infamous Bogus Island.

Beaver Lake was drained due to land speculation that followed the Swamp Land Act of 1850. Beaver Lake and its wetlands covered two-thirds of Newton County, and slowed development until the mid-1800s. By 1889, the lake was destroyed by a six-mile ditch which drained all of its water into the Kankakee River. According to historian Michael Dobberstein, analysis of the draining of Beaver Lake "reveals a decades-long history of fraud, ineptitude, and greed", which involved landowners, state and county officials, the state legislature, and the US Congress. This caused irreversible damage to wildlife habitat, and foreshadowed the destruction of the Kankakee Marsh. Once Beaver Lake, its outlet of Beaver Creek, and its marshes were fully drained, the land was tilled and cultivated.

Since 2016, the dry lake bed has been part of the Kankakee Sands nature preserve.

== Natural history of the lake ==
A Lidar DEM of Beaver Lake and its wetlands in the 1800s.

Beaver Lake measured 7 miles (11 km) long and 5 miles (8.0 km) wide and 6–12 feet (1.8–3.7 m) deep. Its beach lines rose 2–3 feet (0.61–0.91 m) above the landscape.

Estimates of the lake's size range from 25,000 acres (10,000 ha) to 40,000 acres (16,000 ha), which included the lake and marshes. A survey conducted between 1834 and 1835 measured the lake wetlands area at 25 square miles (65 km^{2}), or 16,000 acres (6,500 ha). The lake itself was reevaluated in 1951 as having covered 1,600 acres (650 ha) and its marshes covered 26,000 acres (11,000 ha).

Beaver Lake rested on sand, gravel, and blue till extending 100–150 feet (30–46 m) above bedrock. Sand ridges within the Beaver Lake region extended 10–30 feet (3.0–9.1 m) high. Some of these ridges created islands 70–80 feet (21–24 m) high, including Bogus Island in the center of the lake. The surrounding marshes and ridges consisted of oak groves and prickly pear cacti. Eleven distinct soil types were identified in Beaver Lake and Newton County, consisting of loam, sand, and peat. Drift and marl clays and loose sand dominated the soils.

Bogus Island, in Beaver Lake's center, was covered with black cherry, and the surrounding marshes and ridges consisted of oak groves, ironweed, wild indigo, and prickly pear cacti. Whooping cranes and sandhill cranes resided in the marsh from spring to fall. The lake was inhabited by beaver, otter, muskrats, ducks, geese, and fish.

== Human history of the lake ==
Beaver lake was known in the Potawatomi language as Sag-a-yi-gan-nik-youg, or "Lake of the Beavers". Substantial wild rice beds could be found within Beaver Lake during the time of the Indigenous nations. Their villages, dance floors, burial grounds, and agricultural fields surrounded the lake.

Following the Indian Removal Act of 1830 and the Potawatomi Trail of Tears in 1835, Euro-American settlers slowly flowed into Newton County. Beaver Lake was surveyed in 1834 under the Public Land Survey System. The name Beaver Lake was first recorded by U.S. surveyors in 1834, who deemed it and the surrounding area "of little value." Due to the Swamp Land Act of 1850, Indiana received 1,265,000 acres (5,120 km^{2}) of wetlands, but only about 9,000 acres (36 km^{2}) near Beaver Lake, consisting mostly of its surrounding marshland.

In the 1830s, White fur trappers and hunters pursued game in Beaver Lake. Counterfeiters worked on Bogus Island between 1837 and 1858. Horse thieves were common in the lake region.

A much smaller Beaver Lake is seen in this 1892 map, when the draining of the Grand Kankakee Marsh was underway.

Efforts to farm the county's soils began in earnest following the passage of the Swamp Land Act of 1850. After the state of Indiana began wetland sales in 1853, the lake's shorelines were purchased by speculators; they petitioned the state in 1854 to build a ditch to drain the lake into the Kankakee River. This ditch would reduce the lake margins by 100 yards (91 m). The lake's location 40 feet (12 m) above the Kankakee River facilitated drainage from the lake to the river; the completion of the Beaver Lake Ditch in 1855 allowed the lake to drain 4.5 miles (7.2 km) northward to the main Kankakee River.

In 1853, state swampland engineer Amizi Condi and State Auditor John Dunn purchased the shoreline of the lake. They then sold this land to lawyer Michael Bright, brother of Jesse D. Bright, a U.S. Senator from Indiana. The drainage process began in 1854, when a ditch running from Beaver Lake to the Kankakee River was dug. The Indianapolis Journal correctly predicted that Michael Bright intended to drain the lake and claim ownership of the land. Indeed, once Bright purchased the entire shoreline of the lake, he declared that he owned, "the bed of said lake, and of all the islands covered by the waters thereof."

In 1857, Michael Bright bought the land surrounding Beaver Lake and subdivided the land beneath the lake into lots of 40 acres (16 ha) to sell it for agriculture. Bright platted the lakebed at 15,760 acres (6,380 ha). In 1859, the state paid to widen and lengthen the ditch draining the lake, which was still underwater. By 1860, Bright and his colleagues earned an estimated $1.76 million in land sales from the Beaver lakebed; the cost of draining the lake would be $1.67 million. Lake Ditch was built during the American Civil War to drain Beaver Lake into the Kankakee River. It extends from the natural overflow from Beaver Creek and Beaver Lake and its marshes, and lasted 20 years. Beaver Lake had depths of 12 feet (3.7 m) until a six-mile (9.7 km) ditch was built to drain all of its water into the Kankakee River.

In the 1860s, large numbers of settlers from the eastern U.S. arrived in the lake region. The town of Morocco grew around the lake margins. Although the state used public money to purchase much of the Beaver lakebed land between 1865 and 1870, squatters took control of the government-owned lots as "public property" in 1871. By this time, about three-quarters of the lake bed had been drained.

Decades of legal challenges and court cases followed, during which three-quarters of the lake bed was purchased by Lemuel Milk and his partners Algy Dean and Henry Cooley, who continued draining the lake. In 1873, Congress granted the title to the lands to the state of Indiana. The land disputes led to the U. S. Congress passing an act in 1873 to determine the ownership of the lake lands, which was later challenged in 1879 by a lawsuit claiming the state owned all of the lands, followed by a lawsuit in 1889 allowing the original lot owners to reenter the lands they drained. After more court challenges, Indiana divested itself of the land for cheap in 1889. At this point, the lake was gone and was being used for agriculture.

Bogus Island after Beaver Lake was drained.

Map of drained lakebed of modern Beaver Lake region.

Lemuel Milk completed the ditching of the area and fully drained it by the 1880s. Milk was a wealthy landowner; his businesses included ice houses, steam mills, and general stores. He raised cattle on the prairies and drained wetlands of the lake. Railroad construction failed around the Beaver Lake area in the 1850s.

Developments benefiting from the Beaver Lake Ditch included an 1865 saw mill.

The lake was drained by 1885. This caused irreversible damage to wildlife habitat, and foreshadowed the destruction of the entire Grand Kankakee Marsh. Once the 25,000 acres (10,000 ha) of Beaver Lake, its outlet of Beaver Creek and its marshes were fully drained, the land was tilled and cultivated. Drainage changed the Beaver Lake region's lawless reputation, known to harbor fugitives on Bogus Island. Cattle ranching helped build the local economy; herds grazed on the lake's prairies. Ranching was later supplanted by farming as prairies eventually were used to plant crops.

By the early 1900s, mallard and crane habitats around the former lake region were decimated by farming and industry. One witness of Beaver Lake's destruction stated, "They murdered this land while they were at it, and made a good job of it!" Currently, the Beaver Creek Ditch drains into the Iroquois River, while the Beaver Lake Ditch drains into the Kankakee River.

== Conservation ==
Initially, Beaver lake's loose sand made its soils worthless for agriculture. Railroad lines expanded agricultural growth north of the drained Beaver Lake, as crop yields increased annually.

The land was farmed until the late 1990s. At that time the Nature Conservancy purchased 7,200 acres in and around the lake basin and began restoring the area to native prairie. The land where Beaver Lake once stood has been part of Kankakee Sands since 2016. The Conservancy maintains a trail along what was once the lake's shore.

A concentrated animal feeding operation (CAFO) was given a permit by the Indiana Department of Environmental Management in 2017 to build a facility and operate within the Beaver Lake basin floor. In 2021, opponents to the CAFO won a lawsuit over wetland determinations for the CAFO site within Beaver Lake. The court found the CAFO operated on farmed wetland, which was subject to the Clean Water Act. The CAFO, owned by Natural Prairie Indiana Farmland Holdings LLC, had been permitted by the U.S. Army Corps of Engineers (USACE) to fill and tile ditches and wetland areas in its property; a district court ruled in the case that the USACE's determination was "arbitrary and capricious" by not subjecting the CAFO to the Clean Water Act rules.

== See also ==
Destroyed wetlands

- Draining of the Mesopotamian Marshes
- The Fens
- Grand Kankakee Marsh
- Great Black Swamp
- Great Meadow, Ukraine
- Limberlost Swamp
- Tulare Lake

Living or restored wetlands

- Atchafalaya Basin
- Everglades
- Great Swamp National Wildlife Refuge
- Okefenokee Swamp
- Pantanal
