= Swamp Land Act of 1850 =

US federal law promoting the draining of swampland

A U.S. federal law, the Swamp Land Act of 1850, fully titled "An act to enable the State of Arkansas and other States to reclaim the swamp lands within their limits", essentially provided a mechanism for reverting title of federally-owned swampland to states which would agree to drain the land and turn it to productive, agricultural use. Primarily aimed at the development of Florida's Everglades, and transferring some 20 million acres (31,000 sq mi; 81,000 km^{2}) of land in the Everglades to the State of Florida for this purpose, the law also had application in other states, and spurred drainage and development in many areas of the U.S., including around Indiana's Kankakee River, Michigan's Lake St. Clair's shores, and elsewhere, and encouraged settlement by immigrants arriving in the U.S. after that time. Later considered to have been ecologically problematic, many of its provisions were in time reversed by the Clean Water Act of 1972 and later legislation, but its historical effects on U.S. development and settlement patterns remained.

In Louisiana, the law gave the state 8.5 million acres of river swamps and marshes to sell to pay for flood control measures. Under this plan, thousands of acres of virgin cypress in the Atchafalaya Basin were sold to large corporations, often for $0.75 per acre or less. In return, the state began the construction of a few low levees and performed periodic dredging. An increase in flooding in the Basin, due to the Great Raft removal on the upper Atchafalaya River, gave timber companies more water to float their products to market, allowing the complete destruction of the old-growth cypress forests to ensue with little pushback.

== Legacy and related restoration projects ==
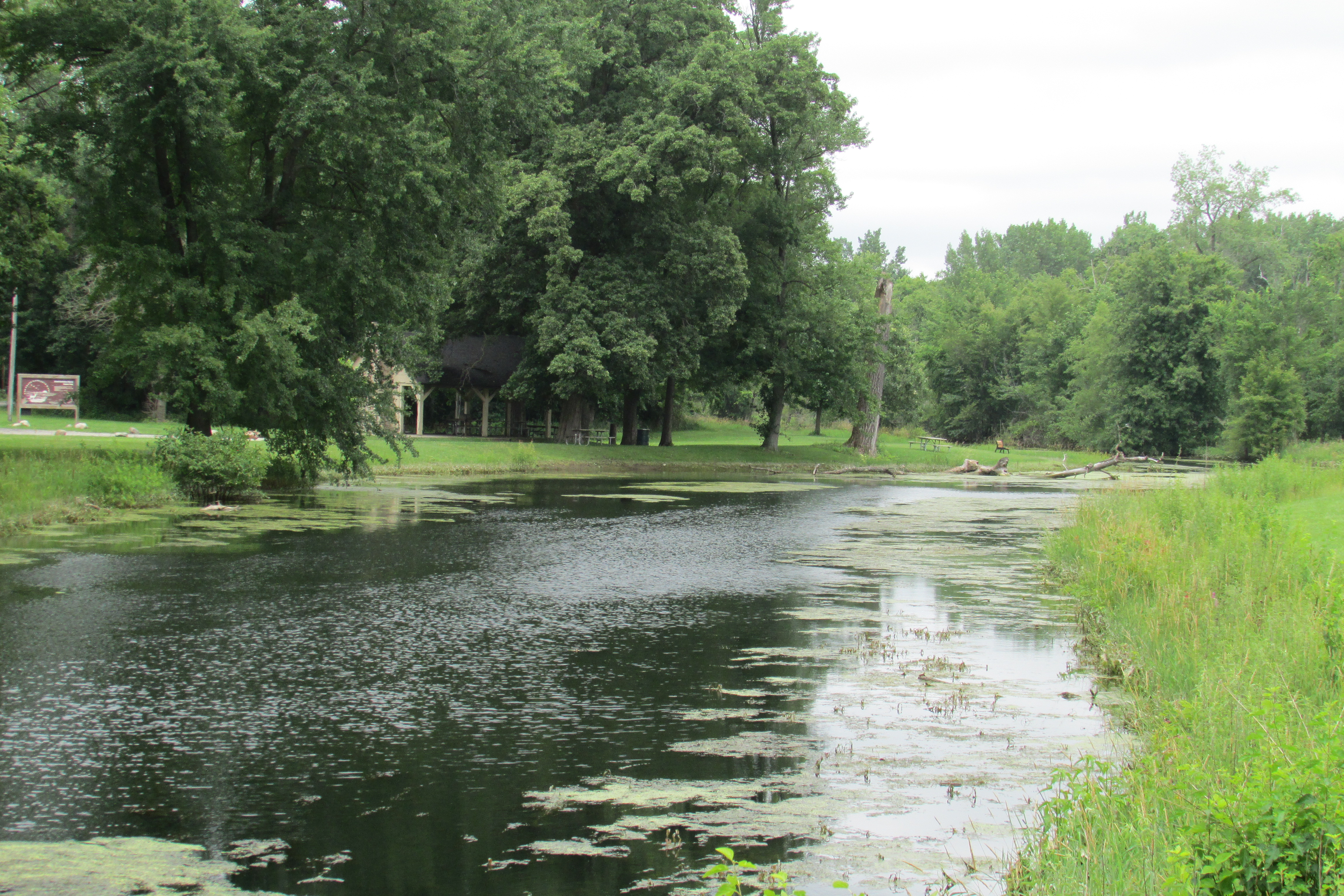
Restored wetland in Grand Kankakee Marsh County Park in Indiana

In multiple states affected by the Swamp Land Act of 1850, as well as the Swamp Land Acts of 1849 and 1860, there have since been efforts to restore drained wetlands.

=== California ===
- Dos Rios State Park in Stanislaus County is the result of restoring farmland drained as a result of the Swamp Land Act of 1850 to functioning wetlands.

=== Indiana ===
- Grand Junction Plaza Park in Westfield was designed around restoring a section of Cool Creek to what it looked like before the Swamp Land Act.
- Grand Kankakee Marsh County Park, part of the Kankakee River, was established in 1979, with 920 acres of marshland restored.
- Beaver Lake in Indiana was drained due to land speculation that started with the Swamp Land Act. The lake bed is included in Kankakee Sands, a nature preserve overseen by the Nature Conservancy.

=== Michigan ===
- Corey Marsh Ecological Research Center in Clinton County, formerly a muck farm, was restored to its natural state in 2018, and became a center for wetlands research among other things. It is owned and managed by Michigan State University.

=== New York ===
- New York City lost most of its wetlands due to the Swamp Land Act. Oyster farming is being used to help restore the New York–New Jersey Harbor Estuary.

=== Wisconsin ===
- There is ongoing discussion of how the University of Wisconsin System, which obtained land belonging to Native American tribes through the Swamp Land Act, should compensate those tribes.
