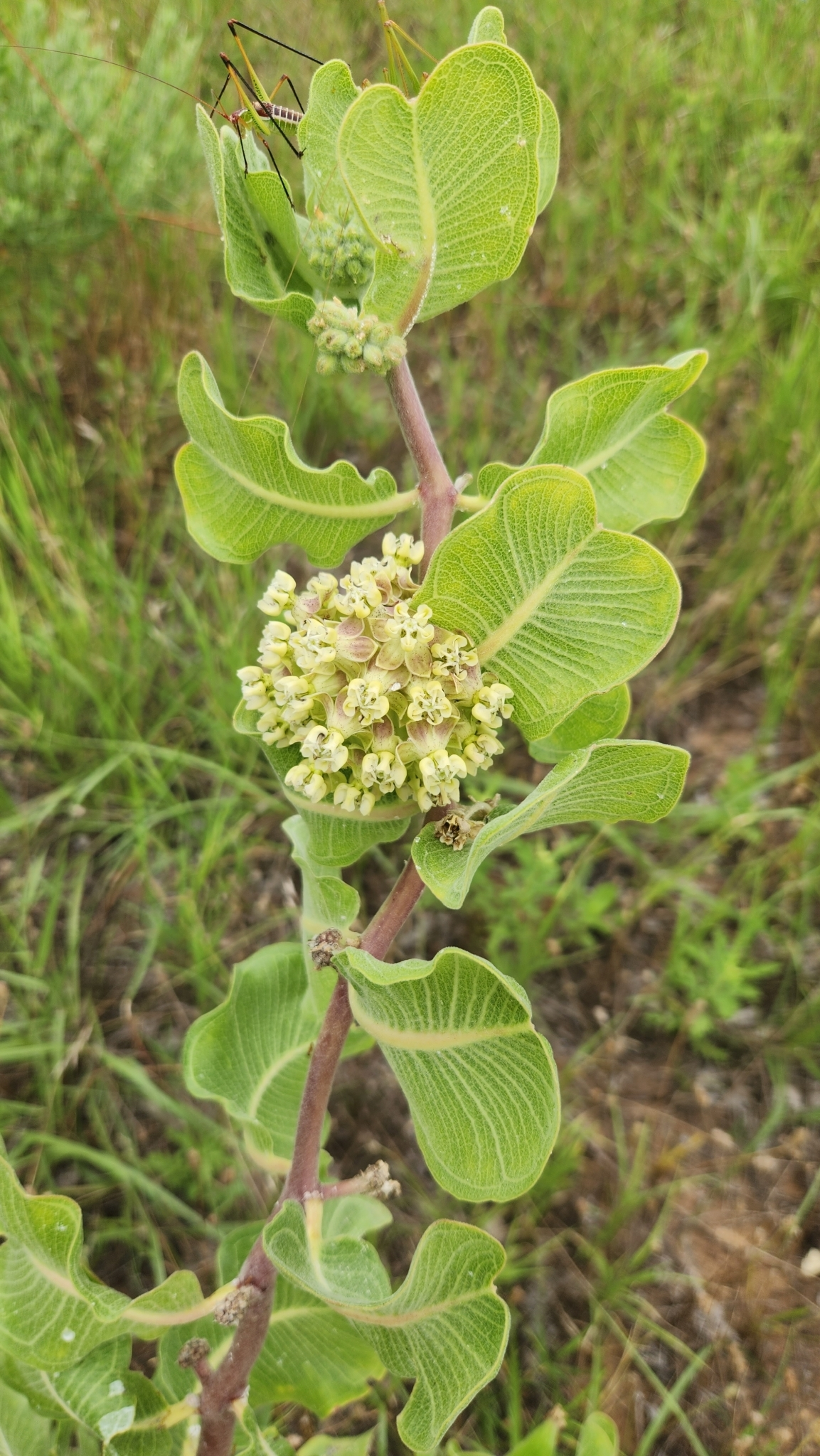
- Beckham County, Oklahoma

Conservation status
- Secure (NatureServe)

Scientific classification
- Kingdom: Plantae
- Clade: Embryophytes
- Clade: Tracheophytes
- Clade: Spermatophytes
- Clade: Angiosperms
- Clade: Eudicots
- Clade: Asterids
- Order: Gentianales
- Family: Apocynaceae
- Genus: Asclepias
- Species: A. arenaria

Binomial name
- Asclepias arenaria Torr.

= Asclepias arenaria =

Plant species in the milkweed family

Asclepias arenaria, sand milkweed, is a species of milkweed that grows in the central US and northern Mexico.

== Description ==
Sand milkweed is a herbaceous plant with one to eight stems that only rarely branch near the base, each 20 to 100 centimeters (8–39 in) long. They can grow straight upwards, spread outwards, or lay upon the ground with just upturned ends. The stems grow from a deep rhizome and are moderately to densely covered in hairs.

The leaves are attached by short 0.7–1.7 cm long leaf stems to opposite sides of the main stems. They are somewhat rectangular to egg-shaped and generally 5–10 centimeters (2–4 in) long and 3–7.5 centimeters (1–3 in) wide, but occasionally as short as 2 cm (1 in) or as narrow as 1.5 cm (0.5 in). The leaves are rounded at the base but can be somewhat indented, like the top of a heart shape, or squared off.

The flowers are in a rounded clusters that are attached to the upper part of the plant just above leaf attachments, each cluster has 14 to 51 flowers. The flower petals are somewhat greenish to white and bent backwards, though occasionally they can be touched with red or purple pigments. The hoods extend upwards and have two lobes, they are similarly pale green, cream colored, or dirty yellow.

== Taxonomy ==
Asclepias arenaria was given its scientific name and described in 1859 by John Torrey. It is part of the genus Asclepias which is classified in the Apocynaceae family and has no subspecies or botanical synonyms.

=== Names ===
The Botanical Latin species name, arenaria, is derived from the Latin harenaria meaning "sandpit", a reference to the preference of the species for sandy habitats. It is likewise known by the common name sand milkweed for growing in sandy places and having milky white sap, however it is also used for Asclepias amplexicaulis. Asclepias arenaria is also sometimes called the sandyland milkweed or western sand milkweed.

== Range and habitat ==
It is native to northern Mexico and the central United States to South Dakota. In Mexico it is native to just two states, Chihuahua and Durango. North of the border it is found in southeastern New Mexico, with records of it from Chaves, Roosevelt, De Baca, and Quay counties. In southern Texas the populations are isolated, but it is much more widespread in the Texas Panhandle. The species grows in the western half of Oklahoma and mostly in western Kansas, but with some occurrences in eastern parts of the state. In Colorado it is a plant of the eastern plains and it is found through much of Nebraska, but though still widespread it becomes rare in the northern half of the state. Northwards it crosses over into South Dakota in Bennett County. The population in Wyoming is isolated, the one area where it is known are the sandhills of Goshen County near Torrington.

The sand milkweed is strongly associated with quite sandy soils. It is noted for frequently growing near the base of dunes that have become somewhat stabilized by vegetation. The species also spreads out of natural habitats into roadcuts.

== Ecology ==
It is used as nectar source by bumblebees, native bees, and honey bees. They also are visited by tarantula hawk wasps and mammoth wasps. Although monarch butterflies will lay eggs on sand milkweed plants, they strongly prefer other species such as swamp milkweed.
