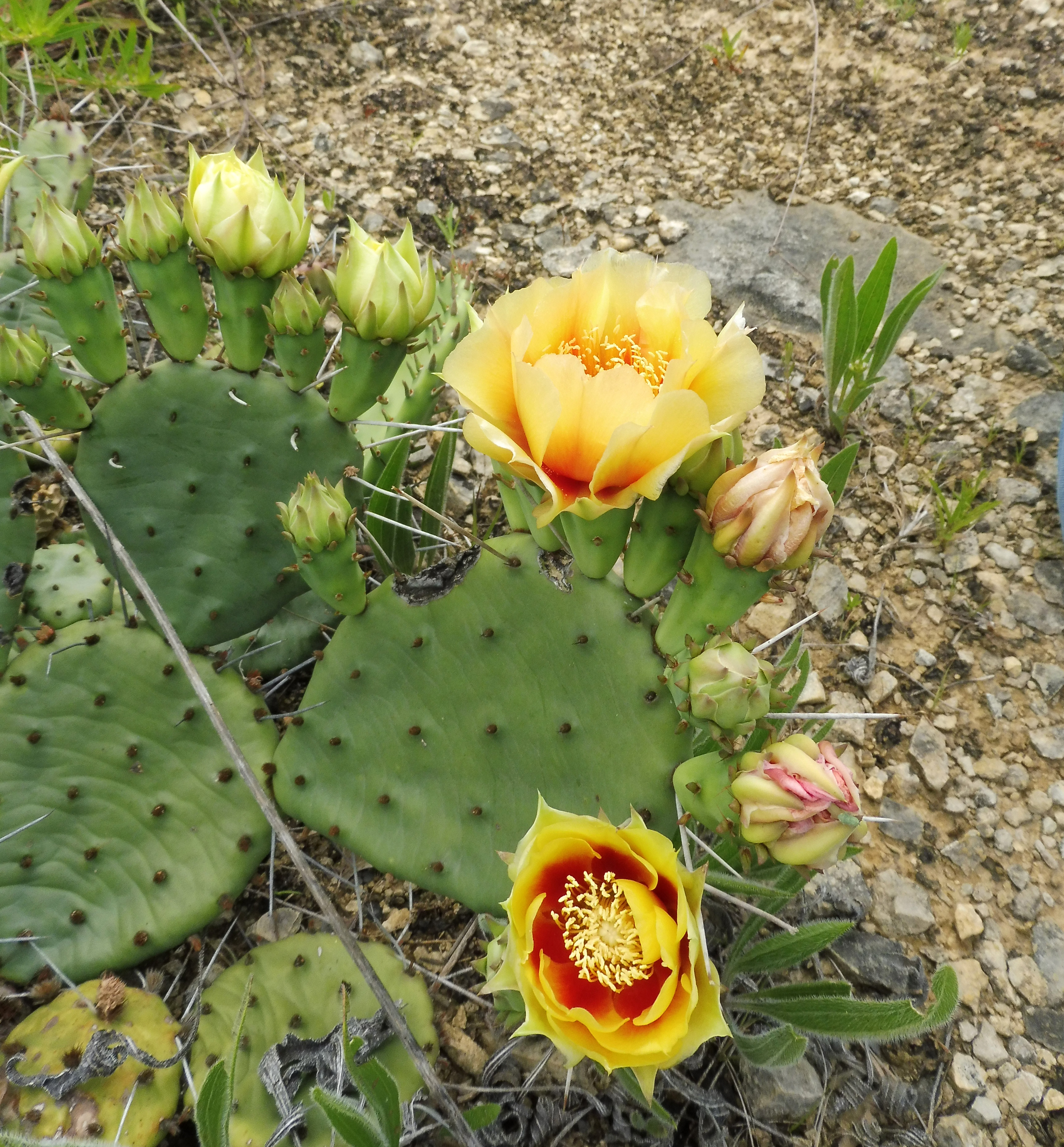

Scientific classification
- Kingdom: Plantae
- Clade: Embryophytes
- Clade: Tracheophytes
- Clade: Angiosperms
- Clade: Eudicots
- Order: Caryophyllales
- Family: Cactaceae
- Genus: Opuntia
- Species: O. cespitosa

Binomial name
- Opuntia cespitosa Raf.

= Opuntia cespitosa =

Species of cactus

Opuntia cespitosa, commonly called the eastern prickly pear, is a species of cactus native to North America.

== Description ==
Opuntia cespitosa is a prostrate, succulent shrub, usually no more than one or two segments tall. It has large, white spines, and a low layer of reddish-brown glochids, which break off in the skin if touched. It produces a yellow and red flower in late spring.

== Taxonomy ==
This species was historically included in a broadly defined Opuntia humifusa group, which is found further to the east. O. cespitosa differs from O. humifusa in its flowers having a red center.

== Distribution and habitat ==
The species is commonly found in the Midwest and Upper South of the U.S. and Ontario in Canada. Its natural habitat is in dry, open areas, such as outcrops, glades, and barrens.

== Invasive plant ==
O. cespitosa is invasive in South Africa. Some Hypogeococcus mealybugs are used as biological pest controls of this and other invasive cacti there.
