= Dos Rios State Park =

State park in California, US

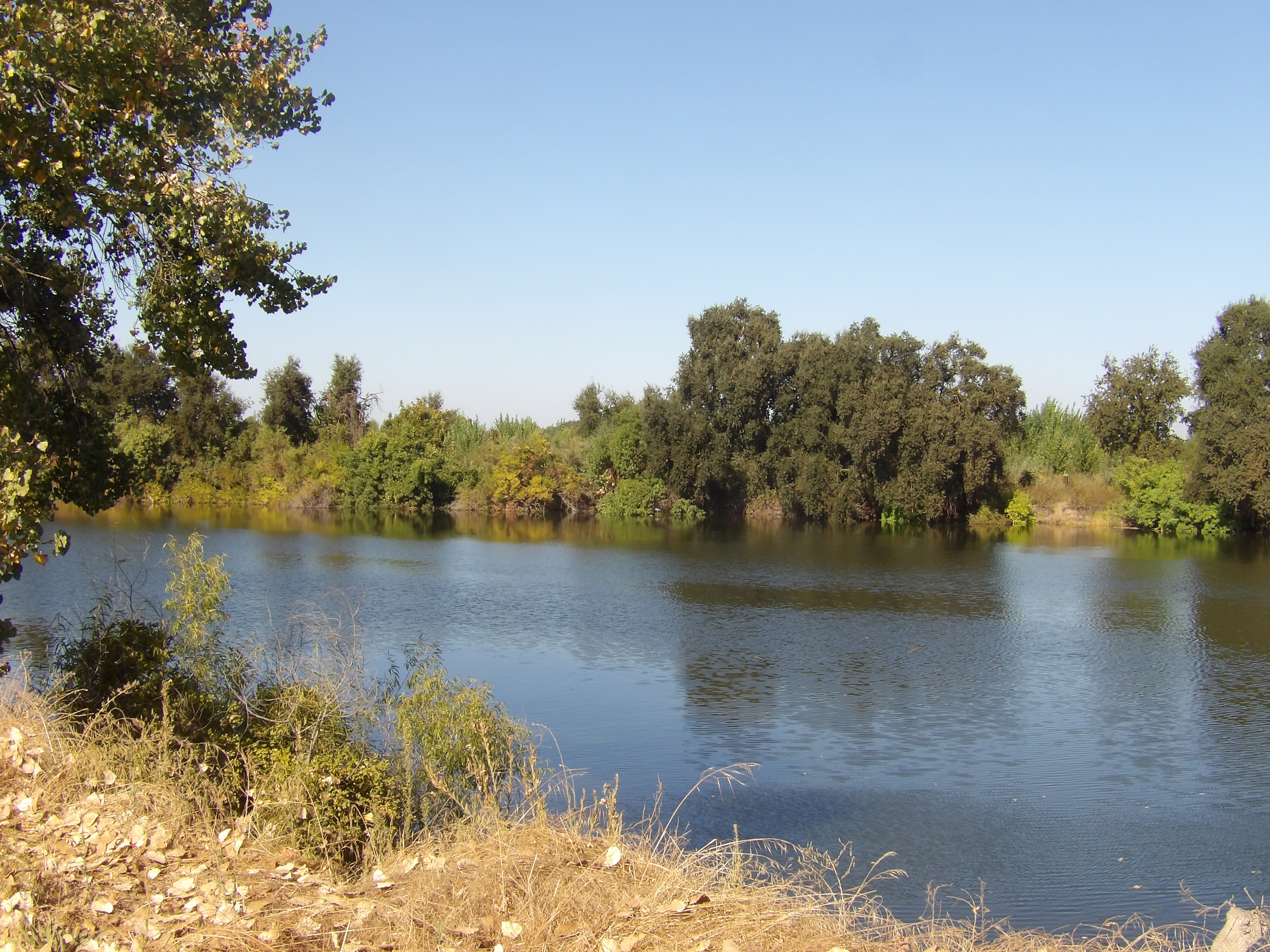
- The pond at Dos Rios State Park
- Interactive map of Dos Rios State Park
- Location: Stanislaus County, California, U.S.
- Nearest city: Modesto
- Coordinates: 37°35′42″N 121°8′37″W
- Area: 1,600 acres (6.5 km^{2})
- Established: 2023
- Governing body: California Department of Parks and Recreation
- Website: www.parks.ca.gov?page_id=31363

Dos Rios State Park in Stanislaus County, California, United States, is about 8 miles (13 km) southwest of Modesto. The California state park opened to the public June 12, 2024. Situated where the San Joaquin and Tuolumne rivers converge, retired farm fields have been planted with native plants like cottonwood, valley oak, milkweed and elderberry bushes which flourished with the initial care they were given. These renewed floodplains create space for water to spread out again as the berms have been modified to allow floodwater to flow freely across the area.

== History ==
Dos Rios State Park is in California's Central Valley, the home of Native American tribes like the Yokuts and Plains and Sierra Miwok. The Central Valley was once filled with wetlands, riparian forests, scrublands, and grasslands. Due to development, deforestation, and the Swamp Land Act of 1850, little of these habitats remain.

The land Dos Rios sits on became farmland for dairies and almond orchards. In 2009, California State Parks director Ruth Coleman proposed the Dos Rios as a future state park as part of the Central Valley Vision Implementation Plan. The nonprofit organizations, River Partners and Tuolumne River Trust, were involved in acquiring and restoring the native habitat. Funding from various government programs and other organizations was used to buy the ranch. In 2012, they purchased the Dos Rios Ranch for $21.8 million and the replanting process started. The park is in the midst of the state’s largest floodplain restoration project.

California governor Gavin Newsom signed a budget allocating $15 million to the project in 2022, making Dos Rios the 281st California state park. A general plan will be developed that includes the preparation of a programmatic Environmental Impact Report.

== Ecology ==
=== Flora ===
Native plants in Dos Rios include valley oak, cottonwood, milkweed, elderberry, dogbane, and valley sedge.

=== Fauna ===
Animals in Dos Rios include riparian brush rabbits, Chinook salmon, sandhill cranes, Aleutian cackling geese, monarch butterflies, and the least Bell’s vireo.

== Features ==
The park was initially opened only on the weekends. Guided walks and interpreters were offered. The park has picnic tables and opportunities for bird-watching. Three acres (1.2 ha) of Dos Rios State Park are set aside for permanent Native use. This area features native plants that can be gathered by Native Americans without a permit for traditional activities like basket weaving. Professors from California State University, Stanislaus have noted the possibilities of utilizing the park with their students.
