= Mammoth wasp =

Mammoth wasp may refer to:

- Scoliidae
- Regiscolia maculata
