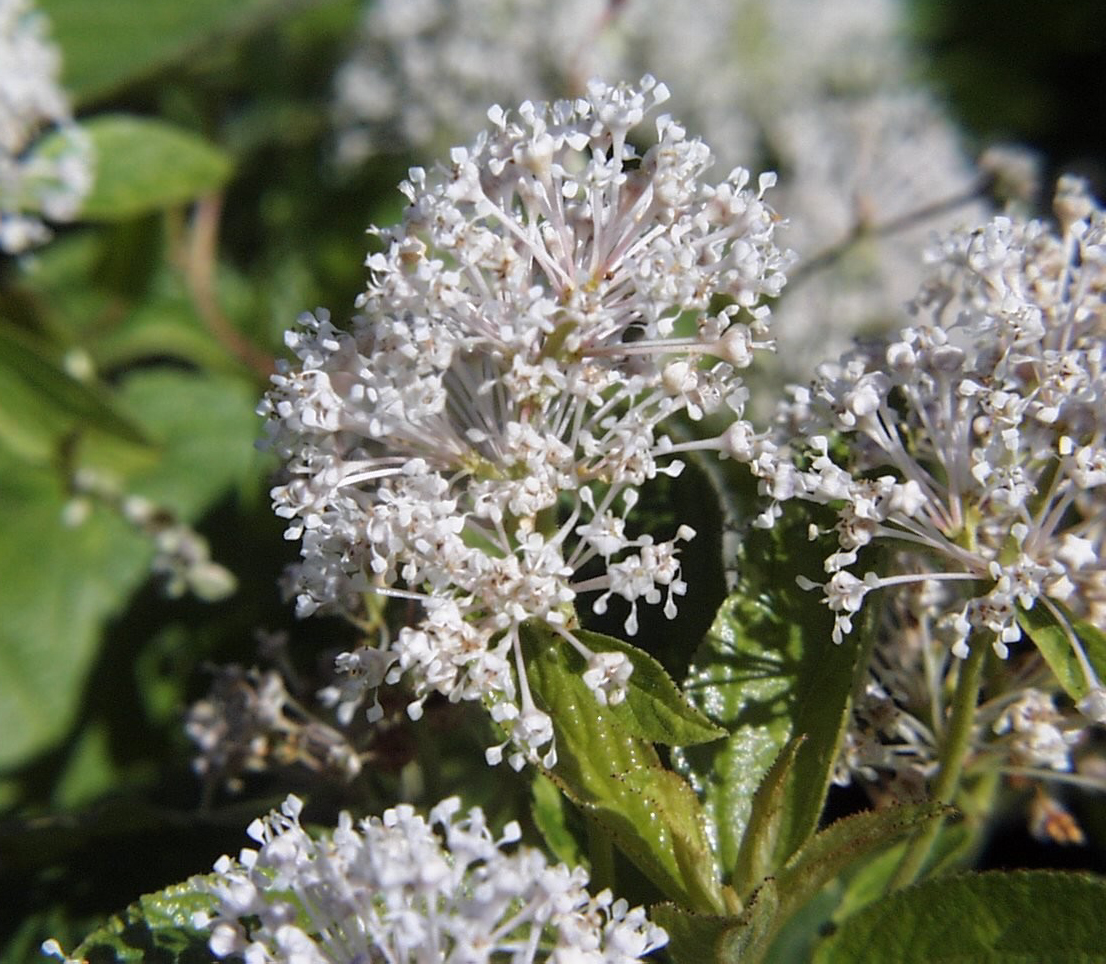

Conservation status
- Secure (NatureServe)

Scientific classification
- Kingdom: Plantae
- Clade: Tracheophytes
- Clade: Angiosperms
- Clade: Eudicots
- Clade: Rosids
- Order: Rosales
- Family: Rhamnaceae
- Genus: Ceanothus
- Species: C. americanus

Binomial name
- Ceanothus americanus L.

Synonyms
- C. a. var. pitcheri Torr. & A.Gray; C. a. var. intermedius (Pursh) K.Koch; C. intermedius Pursh; C. ovatus Desf.

= Ceanothus americanus =

New Jersey tea

Species of flowering plant

Ceanothus americanus is a species of Ceanothus shrub native to North America. Common names include New Jersey tea, Jersey tea ceanothus, variations of red root (red-root; redroot), mountain sweet (mountain-sweet; mountainsweet), and wild snowball. New Jersey tea was a name coined during the American Revolution, because its leaves were used as a substitute for imported tea.

== Description ==
Ceanothus americanus is a shrub that lives up to fifteen years and growing between 18 and 42 in (0.5 and 1 m) high, having many thin branches. Its root system is thick with fibrous root hairs close to the surface, but with stout, burlish, woody roots that reach deep into the earth—root systems may grow very large in the wild, to compensate after repeated exposures to wildfires. White flowers grow in clumpy inflorescences on lengthy, axillary peduncles. Fruits are dry, dehiscent, seed capsules.

== Habitat ==
Ceanothus americanus is common on dry plains, prairies, or similar untreed areas, on soils that are sandy or rocky. It can often be located in forest clearings or verges, on banks or lakeshores, and on gentle slopes.

== Distribution ==
Ceanothus americanus is found in Canada, in Ontario and Quebec. In the U.S., it is found in Alabama; Arkansas; Connecticut; Delaware; northern and central Florida; Georgia; Illinois; Indiana; Iowa; Kansas; Louisiana; Maine (in Oxford and Penobscot counties); Maryland; Massachusetts; Michigan; Minnesota; Mississippi; Missouri; Nebraska; New Hampshire; New Jersey; New York; North and South Carolina; Ohio; Oklahoma; Pennsylvania; Rhode Island; eastern and central Texas; Vermont; West Virginia; Wisconsin; and Virginia.

== Ecology ==
During winter in the Ozarks of Missouri, its twigs are sought as food by the local deer; and white-tailed deer (Odocoileus virginianus), in particular, will browse C. americanus year-round. The leaves are commonly browsed by deer, rabbit, and elk.

The flowers of C. americanus are used as food by (and the shoots host the larvae of) butterflies in the genus Celastrina, including spring azure, and summer azure; and by Erynnis martialis (mottled duskywing) and Erynnis icelus (dreamy duskywing).

Ceanothus americanus seeds are consumed by wild turkeys and quail.

C. americanus is highly tolerant of drought and fire. After being top-killed by fire, it vigorously resprouts from the undamaged rootstock. Fire is a management technique for the spread of the species; with repeated fire, it can become a dominant species along with prairie grasses. It can also colonize burned areas where it was previously absent or rare before the fire occurred.

Ceonothus americanus L. is insect pollinated and is recorded to have been visited in northern Florida by Augochloropsis metallica, and Lasioglossum hitchensi. '

== Constituents and medicinal use ==
The red roots and root bark of New Jersey tea are used by Native Americans in North America for infections of the upper respiratory tract. They also used the roots in washes for syphilis and cancer, and other parts of the plant for treating dysentery, gonorrhea, and eye problems in children.

The leaves have a fresh scent of wintergreen and were later utilized by the European colonizers as a tea substitute and stimulating caffeine-free beverage, notably during the American Revolution.

The root bark of the plant is used by herbalists today, and is used notably in remedies for problems of the lymph system. The root contains astringent tannins and a number of peptide alkaloids, including ceanothine A-E, pandamine, zizyphine, scutianine, and the adouetines. They have a mild hypotensive effect. Root and flower extracts can also be used as dyes.
