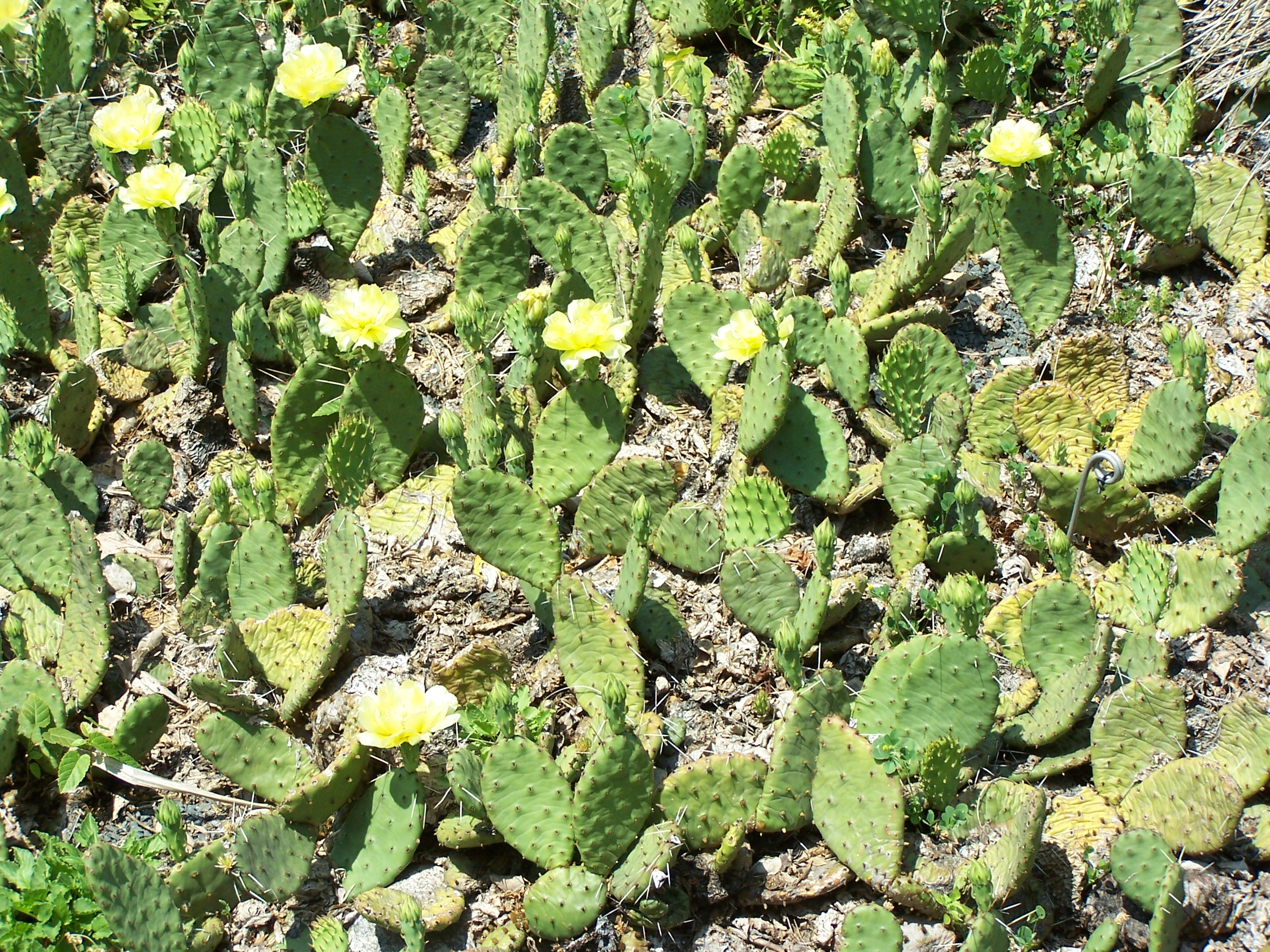

Conservation status
- Least Concern (IUCN 3.1)

Scientific classification
- Kingdom: Plantae
- Clade: Embryophytes
- Clade: Tracheophytes
- Clade: Angiosperms
- Clade: Eudicots
- Order: Caryophyllales
- Family: Cactaceae
- Genus: Opuntia
- Species: O. humifusa

Binomial name
- Opuntia humifusa (Raf.) Raf.

= Opuntia humifusa =

Eastern prickly pear

Species of cactus

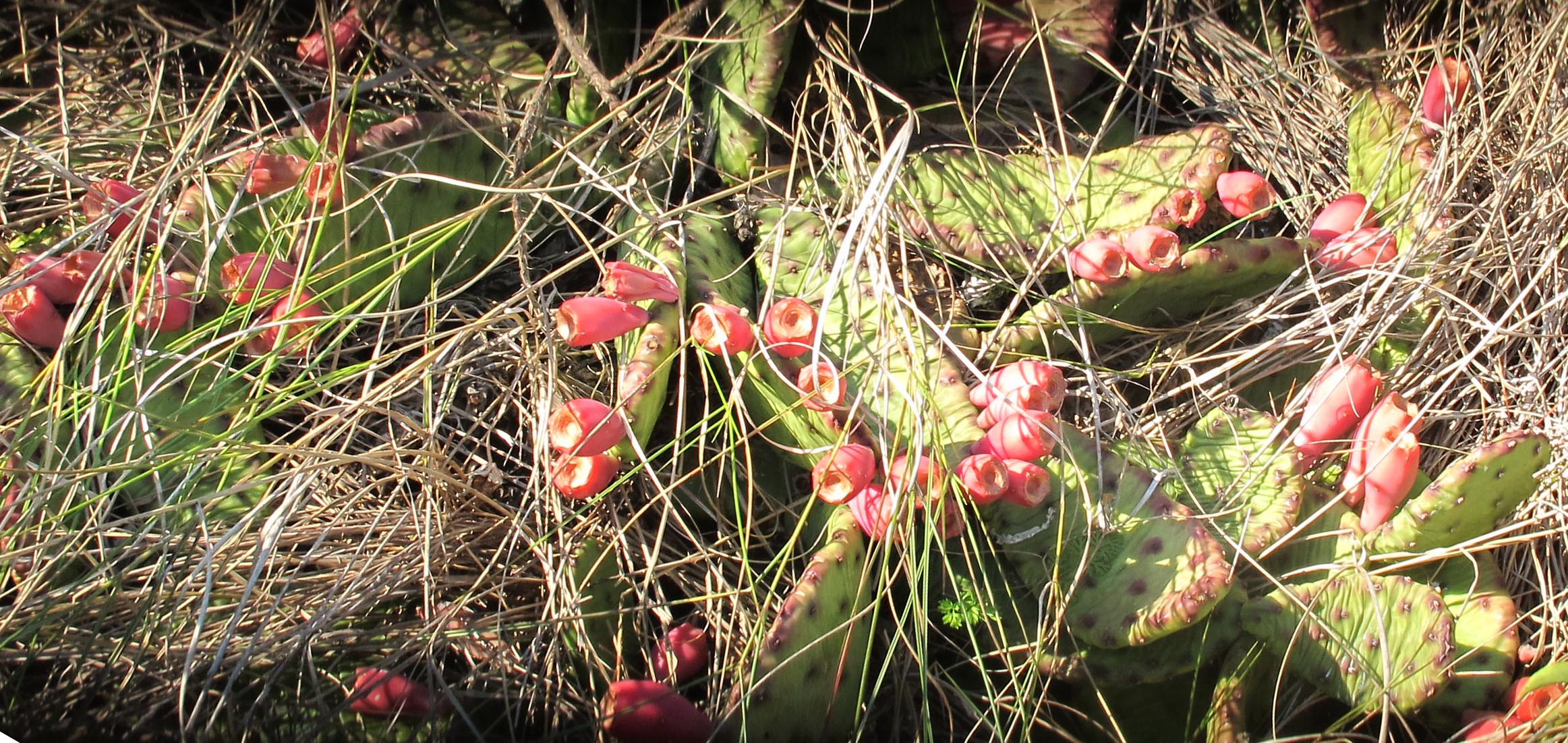
Fruiting by the beach at Welwyn Preserve

Opuntia humifusa, commonly known as the devil's-tongue, eastern prickly pear or Indian fig, is a cactus of the genus Opuntia present in parts of the eastern United States, southeastern Canada, and northeastern Mexico.

== Description ==
As is the case in other Opuntia species, the green stems of this low-growing perennial cactus are flattened, and are formed of segments. Barbed bristles are found around the surfaces of the segments, and longer spines are sometimes present. The flowers are yellow to gold in color, and are found along the margins of mature segments. The flowers are waxy and sometimes have red centers. They measure 4–6 cm (1 5/8–2 3/8 in) across. This cactus blooms in the late spring.

The juicy red or purple fruits measure from 3–5 cm (1 1/8–2 in). As the fruit matures, it changes color from green to red, and often remains on the cactus until the following spring. There are 6 to 33 small, flat, light-colored seeds in each fruit.

== Taxonomy ==
Some botanists treat this cactus as a variety of O. compressa: hence O. c. var. humifusa, or a synonym of O. compressa. Those recognizing this species treat O. rafinesquii as a junior synonym.

== Distribution ==
This species naturally occurs along the East Coast of the United States, including on barrier islands from the Florida Keys to coastal Massachusetts. Eastern prickly pear is found in scattered locations from New Mexico and Montana eastward, and is one of two cactus species native to the eastern United States, along with the related O. cespitosa. Since eastern prickly pear grows in hot, sunny locations with thin soil that does not hold water, it is found in shale barrens, which are accumulations of thin, flat, eroded sedimentary rock on steep slopes with southern exposures – essentially a desert microclimate – in the Appalachian Mountains.

In Canada, the species grows naturally in small pockets of Southern Ontario, along the banks of Lake Erie.

== Habitat ==
This plant is very intolerant of shade and instead thrives in sunny, hot and dry environments with well-draining, sandy soil. O. humifusa will grow in open areas in sandy, rocky and coastal scrub habitats. It is capable of surviving cool winters unlike many cacti, although harsh winter storms are known to cause habitat loss.

== Uses ==
The fruits are edible, but have small spiny bristles. The pulp can be scooped and the seeds strained out to make syrup or jelly. The seeds can be briefly roasted and ground into meal. Young cactus segments can be roasted to remove spines, then peeled and sliced to be eaten like string beans; alternatively, they can be deep fried. The leafy segments can be peeled and chewed for emergency hydration.

Opuntia humifusa has also provided traditional medicine uses in Indian, American, Mexican, and Korean cultures. The stem produces an extract that is high in concentrations of polyphenols and flavonoids. It has also been found that Opuntia humifusa has been associated with endophytic fungi.

== Gallery ==
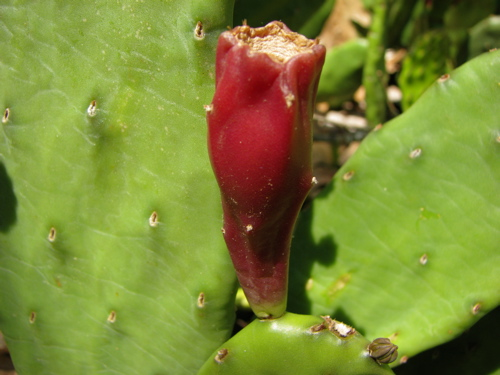
Fruit in South Carolina

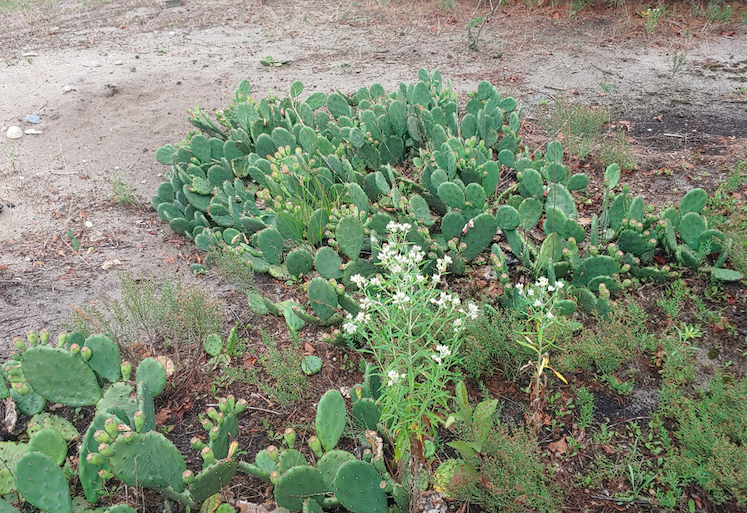
Growing wild in coastal habitat, Milford Connecticut

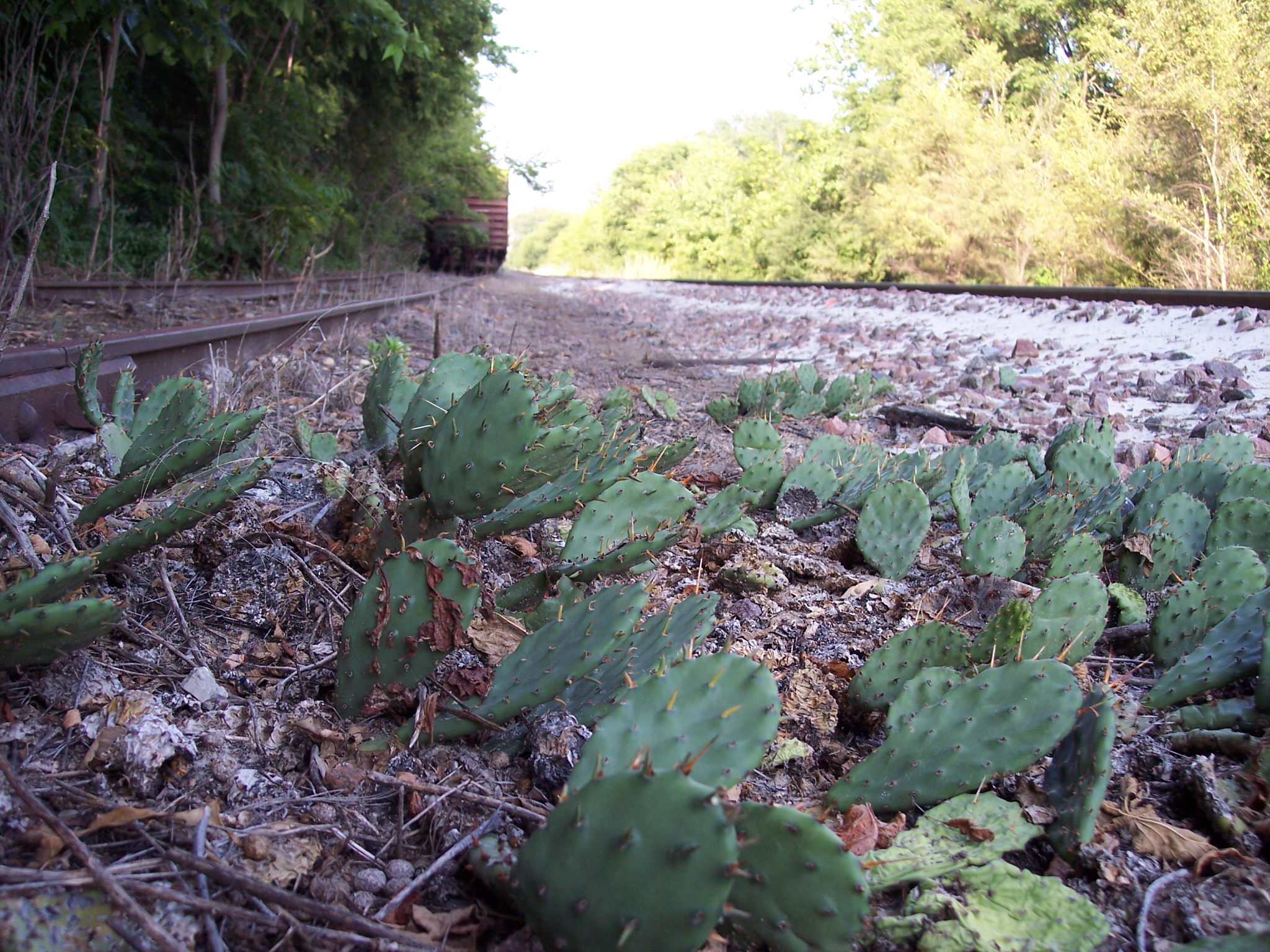
Growing wild in northern Illinois (partial shade)

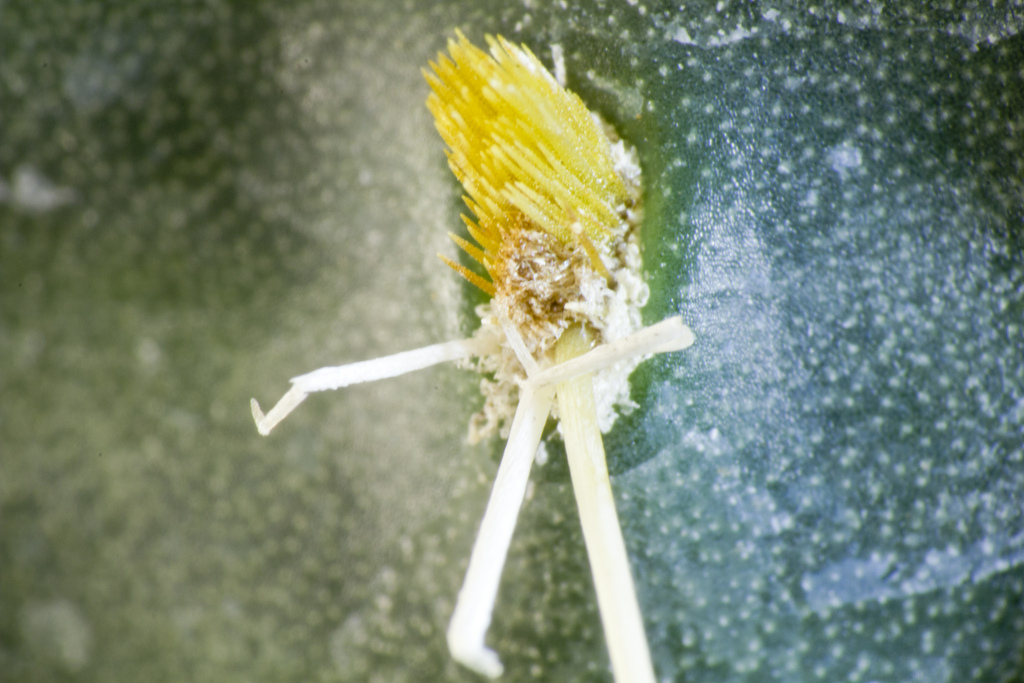
Close-up of yellow barbed bristles and longer spines

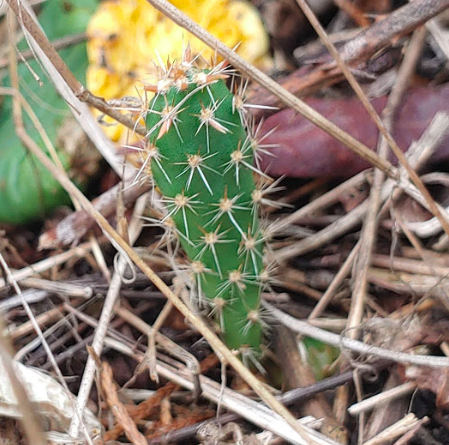
Seedling; notice the larger spines

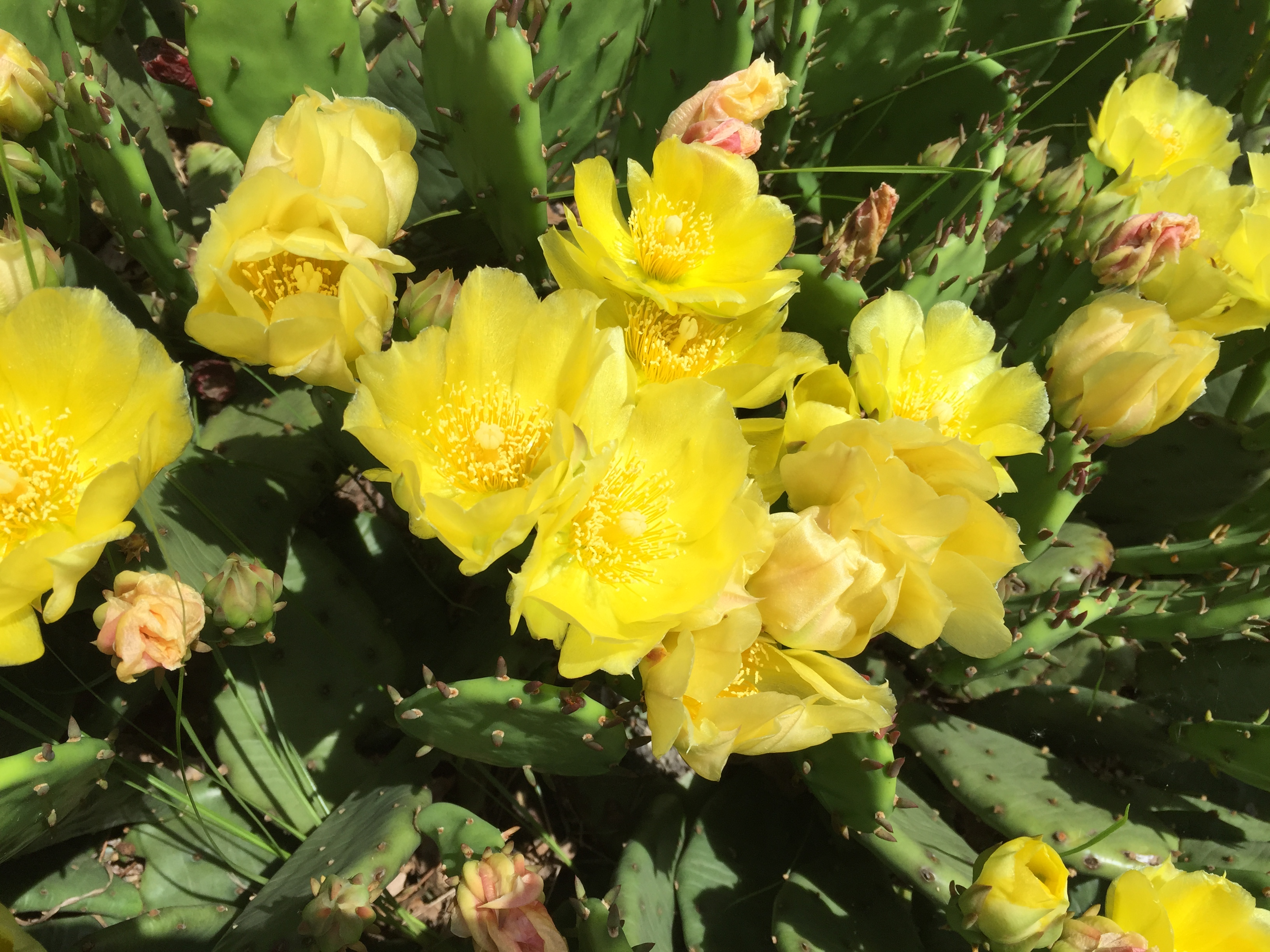
Flowers
