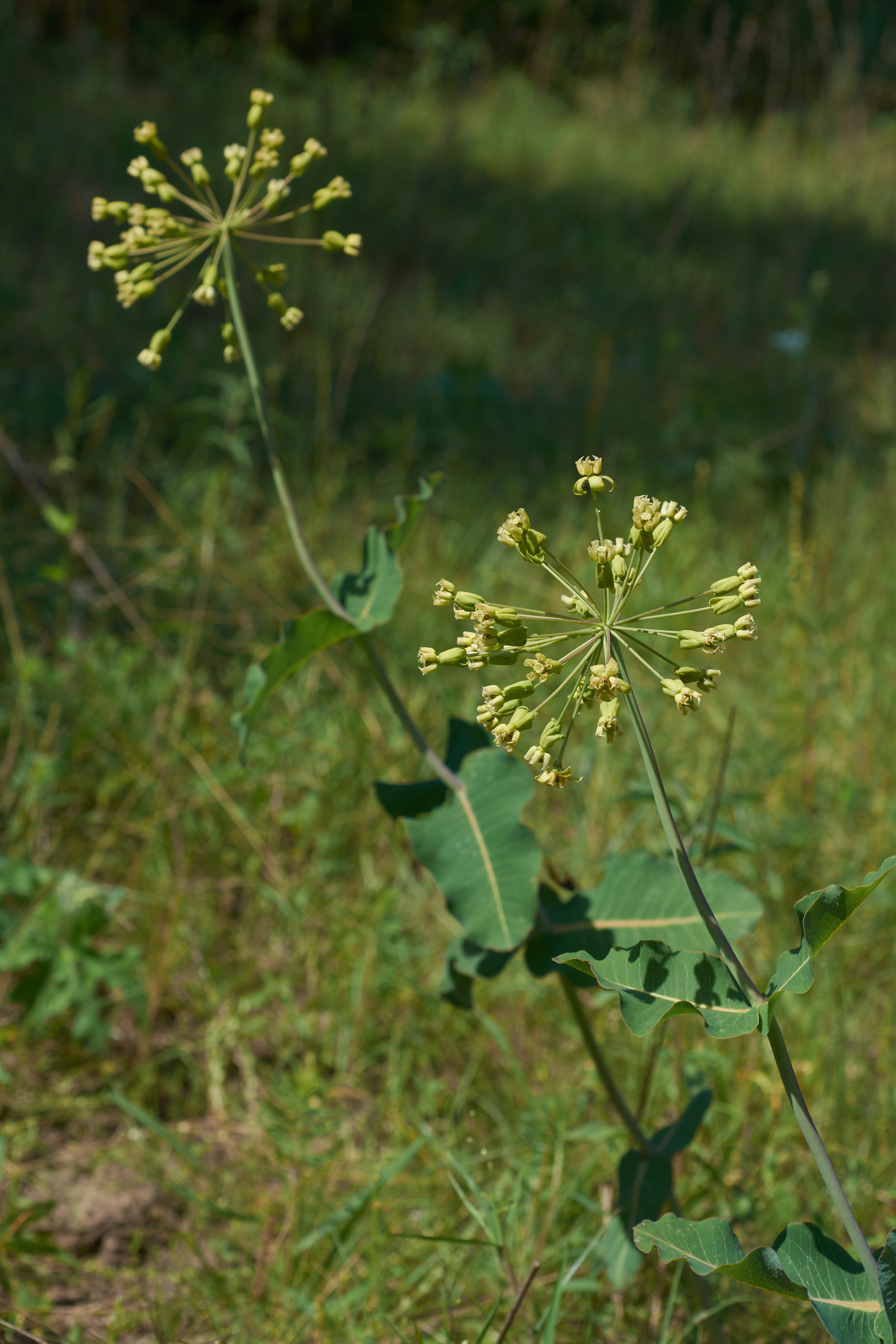

Scientific classification
- Kingdom: Plantae
- Clade: Embryophytes
- Clade: Tracheophytes
- Clade: Spermatophytes
- Clade: Angiosperms
- Clade: Eudicots
- Clade: Asterids
- Order: Gentianales
- Family: Apocynaceae
- Genus: Asclepias
- Species: A. amplexicaulis

Binomial name
- Asclepias amplexicaulis Sm.

= Asclepias amplexicaulis =

Species of flowering plant

Asclepias amplexicaulis, the blunt-leaved milkweed, clasping milkweed, or sand milkweed, is a species of flowering plant in the subfamily Asclepiadoideae (Apocynaceae). It is endemic to the United States, where it is mostly found east of the Great Plains. It grows in dry prairies, savannas, open woods, and fallow fields, usually in sandy soil.

== Description ==
It grows 1–3 ft (0.30–0.91 m) high and produces flowers in the summer.

The leaves of A. amplexicaulis are ovate to ovate-elliptic in shape, opposite, and most commonly found in pairs of 4 to 6. They are approximately 8 to 15 centimeters long and 4 to 8 centimeters wide. A. amplexicaulis' root system can reach between 45 and 60 centimeters in length and is relatively unbranched, with few lateral roots.

This plant was eaten as food historically. However, it contains a poison dangerous to humans and livestock, so caution must be used if ingesting this plant.

== Ecology ==
=== Phenology ===
A. amplexicaulis flowers from spring to summer; flowering as early as April has been observed, with peak inflorescence occurring in May.

=== Fire Ecology ===
A. amplexicaulis occurs in ecosystems prone to burning, such as longleaf pine flatwoods, and has been found to persist through repeated prescribed burns.

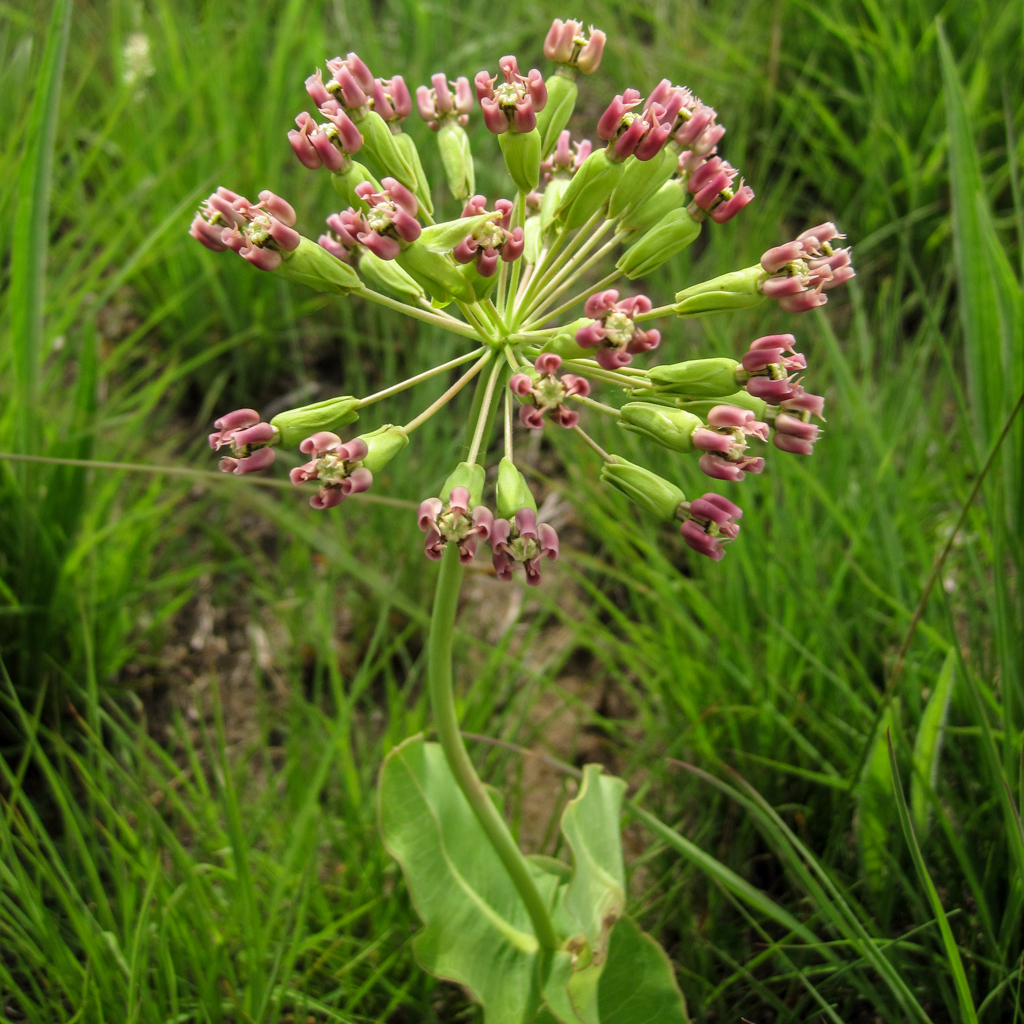
In flower at Nachusa Grasslands in Illinois

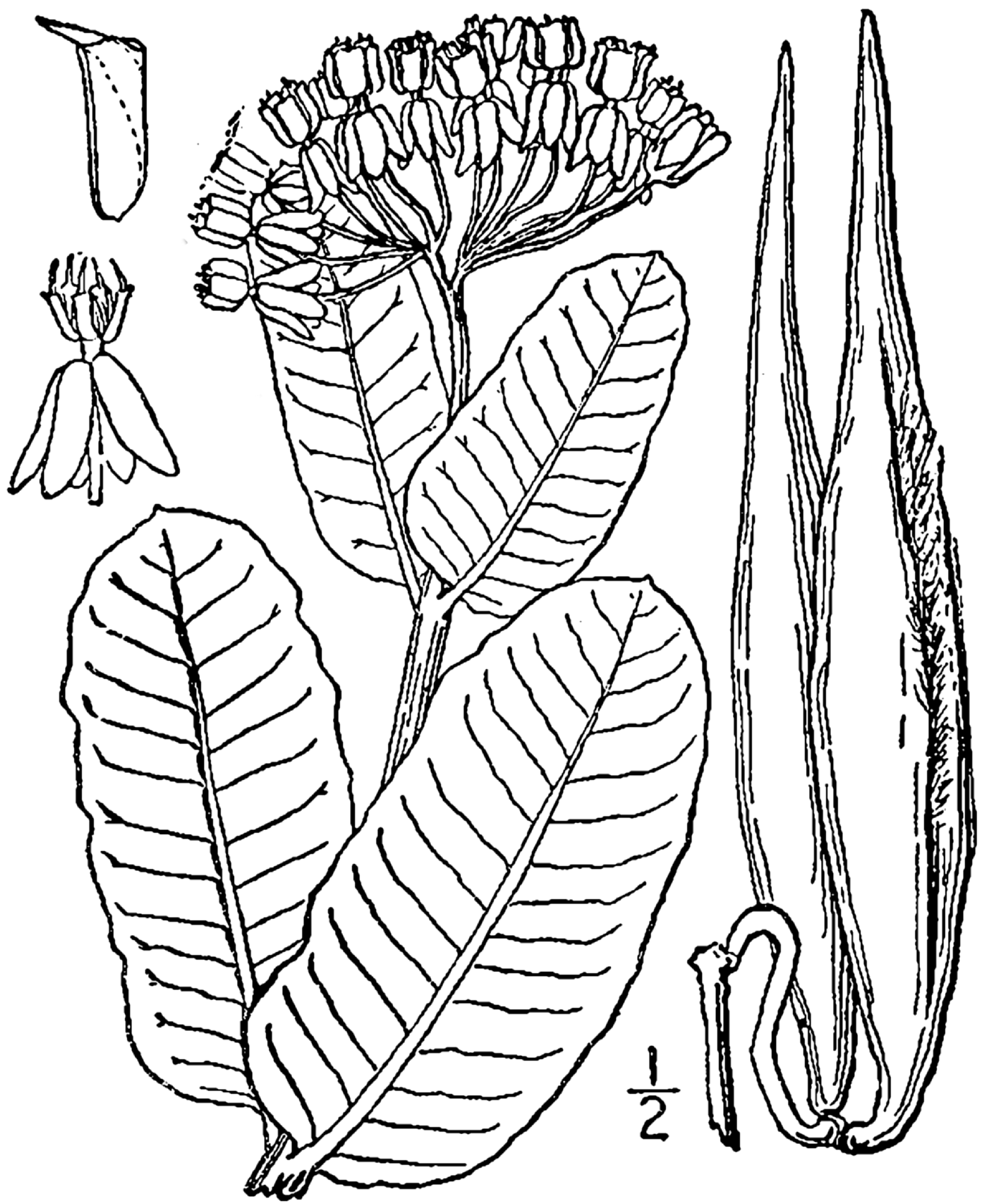
Line drawing
